= Grand Strand =

Coastal area in South Carolina, US

Coordinates: 33°40′48″N 78°52′48″W

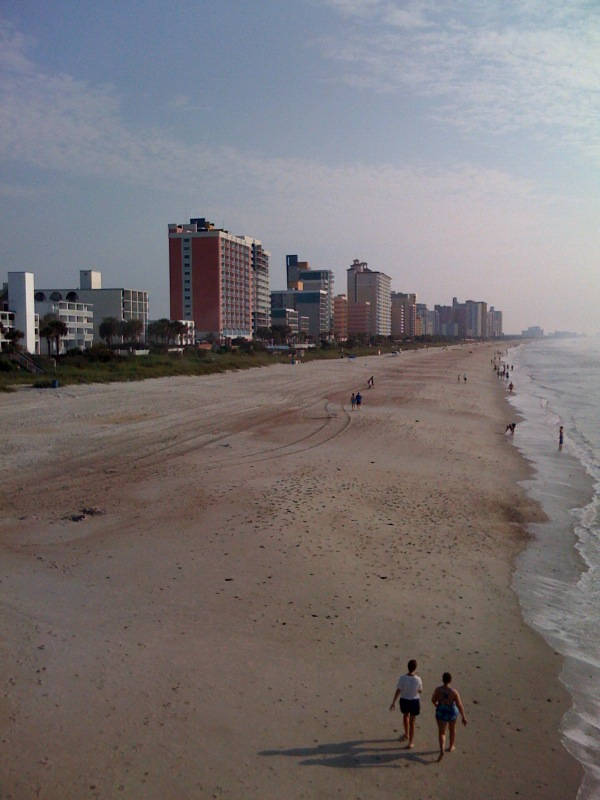
Myrtle Beach

The Grand Strand is an arc of beach land on the Atlantic Ocean in South Carolina, United States, extending more than 60 miles (97 km) from Little River to Winyah Bay. It is located in Horry and Georgetown counties on the northeastern South Carolina coast. It is often included in the Pee Dee region.

The term Grand Strand dates back to a November 19, 1949 The Myrtle Beach Sun column, "From the Grandstrand" and another titled "From the Grand Strand" on December 3, 1949, in The Myrtle Beach News.

The area has become a major tourist attraction along the Southeastern coast, attracting 20.6 million visitors in 2019. The area, whose primary city is Myrtle Beach, is home to numerous hotels, golf resorts, and recreational centers, making it popular with families and college students during the summers and winters.

== Climate ==
According to Köppen climate classification, the Myrtle Beach area has a humid subtropical climate that is heavily influenced by the Atlantic Ocean, giving the area a more oceanic feel. The city experiences cool winters and hot, humid summers.

Rainfall is plentiful throughout the whole year, but most concentrated during the summer months, where it is not uncommon for almost every day to have at least a 30% chance of rain. The area is susceptible to strong thunderstorms, especially in the summer months. These typically have a very short duration, although some may have intense hail with tornadoes rarely.

Snowfall is extremely rare in this part of the state, but does occasionally occur.

Climate data for Myrtle Beach
Month	Jan	Feb	Mar	Apr	May	Jun	Jul	Aug	Sep	Oct	Nov	Dec	Year
Record high °F (°C)	83 (28)	85 (29)	94 (34)	96 (36)	101 (38)	106 (41)	104 (40)	106 (41)	102 (39)	98 (37)	89 (32)	84 (29)	106 (41)
Mean daily maximum °F (°C)	57 (14)	61 (16)	68 (20)	76 (24)	83 (28)	88 (31)	91 (33)	90 (32)	85 (29)	77 (25)	69 (21)	60 (16)	75 (24)
Mean daily minimum °F (°C)	34 (1)	37 (3)	44 (7)	51 (11)	60 (16)	69 (21)	72 (22)	71 (22)	65 (18)	54 (12)	45 (7)	37 (3)	53 (12)
Record low °F (°C)	4 (−16)	11 (−12)	12 (−11)	22 (−6)	35 (2)	42 (6)	51 (11)	55 (13)	45 (7)	22 (−6)	16 (−9)	8 (−13)	4 (−16)
Average precipitation inches (mm)	4.12 (105)	3.35 (85)	3.92 (100)	3.05 (77)	3.19 (81)	4.63 (118)	6.81 (173)	7.38 (187)	5.52 (140)	3.55 (90)	3.01 (76)	3.48 (88)	52.01 (1,320)
Source: The Weather Channel

== History ==
The F.G. Burroughs steamship

Prior to the arrival of Europeans, the Long Bay area was inhabited by the native Waccamaw Tribe. The Waccamaw used the river for travel and fished along the shore around Little River. Waties Island, the primary barrier island along Long Bay, has evidence of burial and shell mounds, remains of the visiting Waccamaw.

The first European settler along Long Bay arrived in the late 18th Century, attempting to extend the plantation system outward towards the ocean. Records are sparse from this period, with most of the recorded history pieced together from old land grants documents. These settlers were met with mixed results, producing unremarkable quantities of indigo and tobacco as the coast's soil was sandy and most of the crop yields were of an inferior quality.

Prior to the American Revolution, the area along the future Grand Strand was essentially uninhabited. Several families received land grants along the coast, including the Withers: John, Richard, William, and Mary. This family received an area around present-day Wither's Swash, also known as Myrtle Swash or the 8-Mile Swash. A separate grant was granted to James Minor, including a barrier island named Minor Island, now Waties Island, off of the coast near Little River.

Mary Wither's gravestone at Prince George Winyah Parish Church speaks to the remoteness of the former Strand: "She gave up the pleasures of Society and retired to Long Bay, where she resided a great part of her life devoted to the welfare of her children."

As the American colonies gained independence, the area remained essentially unchanged, and the coast remained barren. George Washington scouted out the Southern states during his term, traveling down the King's Highway. He stayed a night at Windy Hill (part of present-day North Myrtle Beach) and was led across Wither's Swash to Georgetown by Jeremiah Vereen.

The Withers family remained one of the few settlers around Myrtle Beach for the next half-century. In 1822, a strong hurricane swept the house of R. F. Withers into the ocean, drowning 18 people inside. The tragedy made the Withers family decide to abandon their plots along the coast. Left unattended, the area began to return to forest.

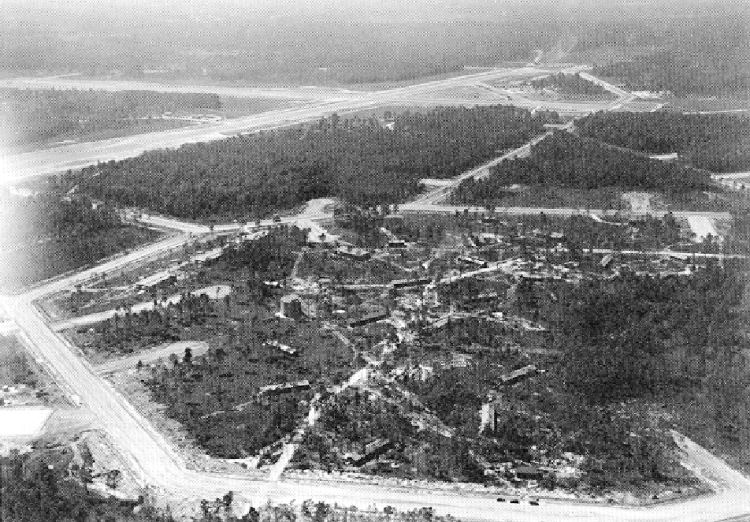
Original Myrtle Beach Air Force Base during World War II

On February 28, 1899, Burroughs and Collins, predecessor of modern-day Burroughs and Chapin, received their charter to build the Conway & Seashore Railroad to transport timber from the coast to inland customers. The railroad began daily service on May 1, 1900, with two wood-burning locomotives. One of the engines was dubbed The Black Maria and came second-hand from a North Carolina logging operation. A community named "Withers" post office was established at the site of the old Swash.

After the railroad was finished, employees of the lumber and railroad company would take train flatcars down to beach area on their free weekends, becoming the first Grand Strand tourists. The railroad terminus was nicknamed "New Town", contrasting it with the "Old Town", or Conway.

At the turn of the 20th century, Franklin Burroughs envisioned turning New Town into a tourist destination rivaling the Florida and northeastern beaches. Burroughs died in 1897, but his sons completed the railroad's expansion to the beach and opened the Seaside Inn in 1901.

After its founding, New Town continued to grow until 1957, when it incorporated. A contest was held to name the town and Burroughs' wife suggested honoring the locally abundant shrub, the Southern Wax Myrtle (Myrica cerifera). So the town was named Myrtle Beach.

In 1937, Myrtle Beach Municipal Airport was built, however it was promptly taken over by the United States Army Air Corps in 1940 and converted into a military base. Commercial flights began in 1976 and shared the runway for over 15 years until the air base closed in 1993. Since then the airport has been named Myrtle Beach International Airport. In 2010 plans to build a new terminal were approved. In 1940, Kings Highway was paved, giving Myrtle Beach its first primary highway.

== Economy ==
The Grand Strand's economy is dominated by the tourist industry, with tourism bringing in millions of dollars each year. Hotels, motels, resorts, restaurants, attractions, and retail developments exist in abundance to service visitors.

There are over 100 golf courses in and around Myrtle Beach as the golfing industry represents a significant presence in the area.

A manufacturing base produces plastic, rubber, cardboard, foam, and ceramic products usually in small scale.

=== Tourism ===
Hosting 20.6 million visitors in 2019, The Grand Strand is home to an array of tourist attractions, and the area receives a large influx of visitors during the spring and summer seasons.

The Grand Strand hosts a variety of special conventions, events, and musical concerts. The area's attractions include its beaches and many golf courses, as well as a number of amusement parks, an aquarium, an IMAX theater, retail developments and over 1,900 restaurants including seafood restaurants, and a number of shopping complexes. The area also has dinner theaters, nightclubs, and many tourist shops. Myrtle Beach has an estimated 460 hotels, with many on the beachfront, and approximately 89,000 accommodation units in total. Also in the city is Myrtle Waves, one of the largest water parks on the eastern seaboard.

The Myrtle Beach Boardwalk opened in 2010 and has been recognized as the nation's #3 boardwalk by National Geographic and one of the best US boardwalks by Travel + Leisure magazine. Opened in May 2011, The Myrtle Beach Skywheel features glass gondolas that look over the Atlantic Ocean. Myrtle Beach State Park, established in 1935, has just under a mile of Grand Strand beach and is a prime location for swimming, hiking, biking, and fishing.

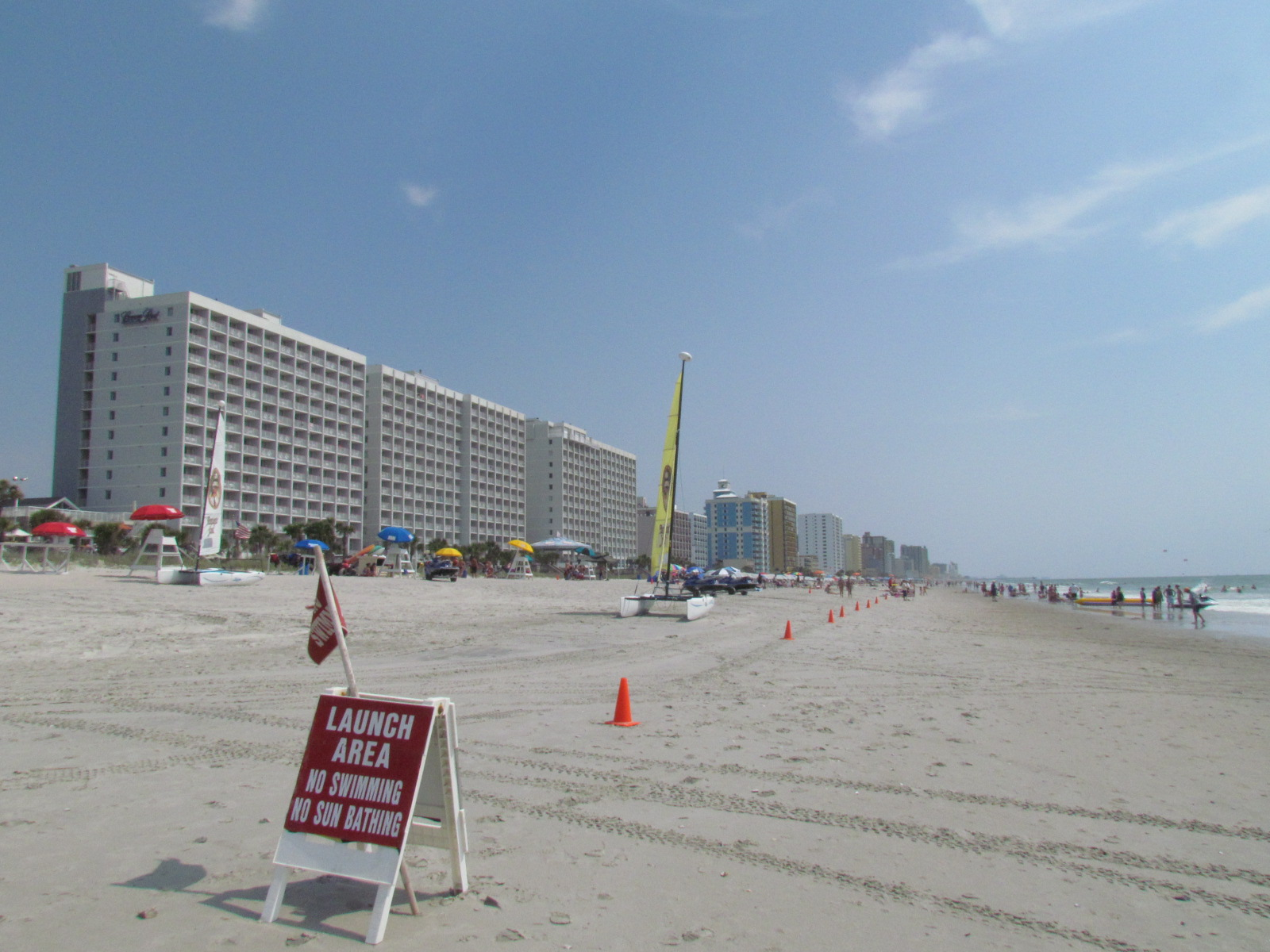
Hotels in Myrtle Beach

The Myrtle Beach Convention Center is a large facility that hosts an array of different meetings, conferences, exhibits, and special events every year. The center, which opened in 2003, also features a Sheraton hotel and resort.

Myrtle Beach welcomed Hard Rock Park in 2008, which was themed after the popular Hard Rock Cafe chain. After financial issues, the park became Freestyle Music Park for the 2009 season. The park features attractions themed after different genres of music, such as the British Invasion. The park closed permanently after the 2009 season due to financial and legal issues.

Each March since 1951 during Ontario's spring break, Myrtle Beach has hosted Canadian-American Days, also known as Can-Am Days. Tens of thousands tourists come to the area for a week's worth of special events. Myrtle Beach is also home to Coastal Uncorked, a food and wine festival held in the late spring annually. In June, recently graduated high school seniors come to Myrtle Beach for Senior Week.

With numerous professional fireworks displays along the oceanfront, Myrtle Beach is recognized among the top destinations for Fourth of July travel. Priceline.com ranked Myrtle Beach among its top 20 destinations for Fourth of July in 2010.

Gambling is not legal in South Carolina. However, Myrtle Beach residents and visitors have easy access to gambling by boat, which transports passengers into international waters beyond the reach of federal and state gambling laws.

==== Motorcycle rallies ====
Myrtle Beach Bike Week, also called "Harley Bike Week" is a week-long motorcycle rally that started in 1940 and attracted as many as 200,000 visitors to the city every May. Black Bike Week, founded in 1980, takes place the weekend around Memorial Day Weekend and is the largest African American motorcycle rally in the US and attracts as many as 400,000 visitors. The event was created in response to a history of discrimination against African-American visitors and riders to Myrtle Beach and the Grand Strand Area.

The Myrtle Beach government created 15 new laws aimed at preventing all sanctioned motorcycle events within the city in response to controversy including accusations of racism by African-American riders during their event and complaints of lawlessness and poor behavior during all highly attended events. Several lawsuits by the National Association for the Advancement of Colored People (NAACP) against Myrtle Beach businesses were settled with agreements that discrimination cease, compensation be given to some plaintiffs, and employees be given diversity training. The NAACP suit against the City of Myrtle Beach was settled in 2006 without the city paying damages, but with the agreement police would use the same traffic control rules during both the black and the white motorcycle rallies.

The South Carolina Supreme Court in June 2010 unanimously overturned one of the 15 ordinances, which had required all motorcyclists to wear helmets, on the grounds that the state law, requiring helmets only for riders under age 21, cannot be preempted by a city ordinance. In addition, the Court ruled, the ordinance created undue confusion, and that the city itself had invalidated their own helmet law and some other ordinances in a subsequent amendment. The law had been challenged by a group of motorcyclists and a group of Myrtle Beach businesses called BOOST, Business Owners Organized to Support Tourism, who opposed the city's anti-motorcycle tourism policy.

=== Shopping ===
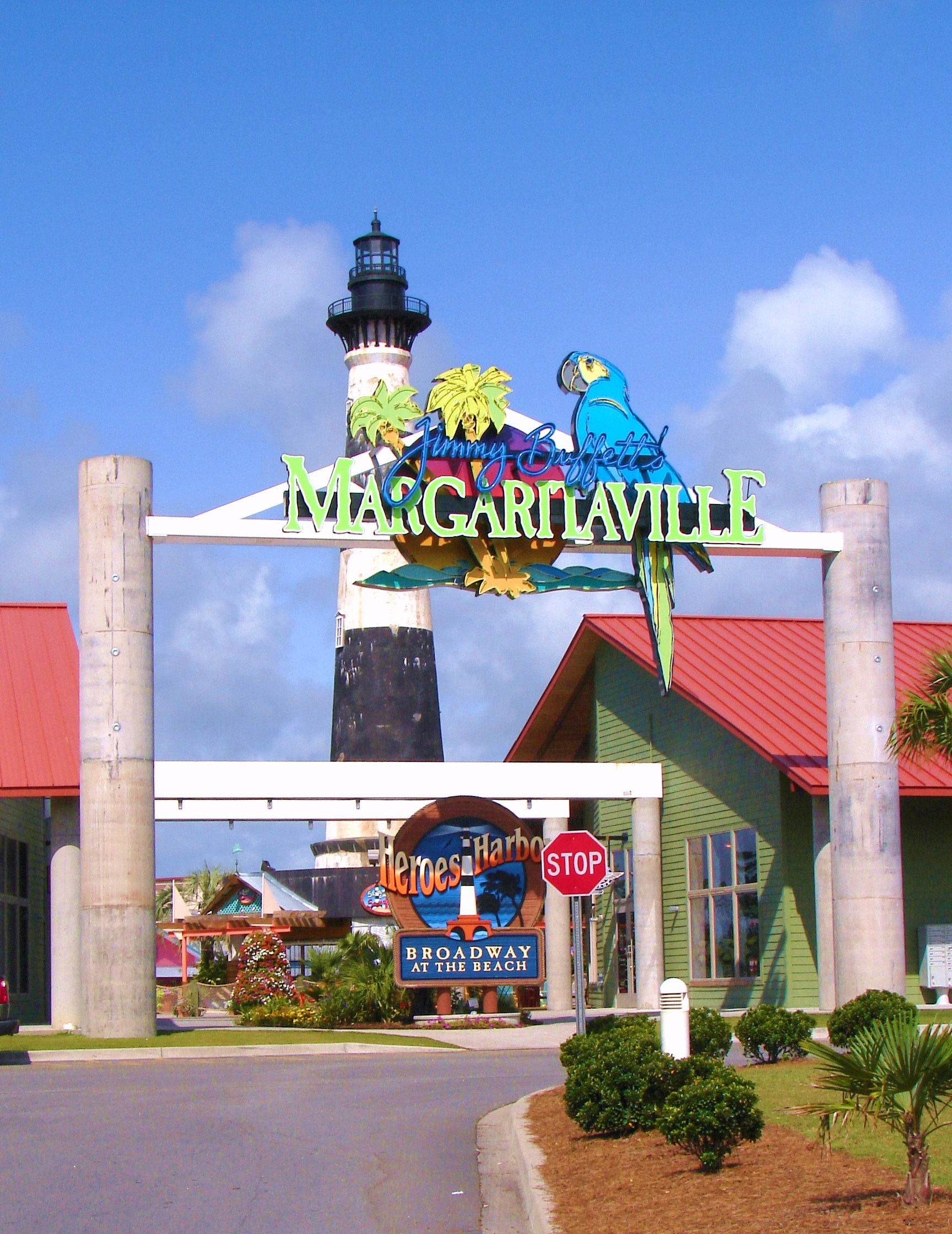
Heroes Harbor at Broadway at the Beach in June 2006

The Grand Strand area has many different stores and malls, is one of the largest shopping areas in the Southeastern United States, and is the largest shopping destination in South Carolina.

- Barefoot Landing opened in 1988 and currently includes 100 stores, restaurants and attractions. The center also has the Alabama Theatre, which has concerts by traditional country music singers. The center includes a golf resort.
- Coastal Grand Mall opened in 2004 and is the largest indoor mall in the state. The mall, which has indoor and outdoor shopping areas, has a gross leasable area of 1,047,732 square feet (97,337.5 m^{2}). The single-story facility has five anchor stores (including Belk, JCPenney, and Dillard's), a 14-screen movie theater, a food court, and roughly 170 stores.
- Myrtle Beach Mall is 525,385 square feet (48,809.9 m^{2}), and has three anchor stores: Bass Pro Shops, Belk and JCPenney. The single-story mall also has a 12-screen movie theater, a food court, and a variety of other specialty stores. It used to be known as Colonial Mall, and opened as Briarcliffe Mall.
- Tanger Outlets at Myrtle Beach features over 100 brand name outlets such as Nautica and Sony. It is located on U.S. Route 501 entering the city.
- Broadway at the Beach is a shopping complex set on 350 acres (1.4 km^{2}) along the Highway 17 Bypass, with three theaters, 17 restaurants, more than 100 specialty shops, attractions, nightclubs, and three hotels, surrounding the 23-acre (93,000 m^{2}) Lake Broadway. It is the largest festival entertainment complex in South Carolina. It has an IMAX theater, Ripley's Aquarium, Hard Rock Cafe, Planet Hollywood, Jimmy Buffett's Margaritaville, and The Pavilion Nostalgia Park.
- The Market Common is a lifestyle center with several stores and a movie theater. It is located on the site of the former Myrtle Beach Air Force Base.

== Education ==
=== Public schools ===
See Horry County Schools

=== College/post-secondary ===
The Grand Strand provides following college and post-secondary schools:

- Coastal Carolina University
- Horry-Georgetown Technical College
- Webster University - Myrtle Beach Campus
- NAIA Flight School
- Cathedral Bible College
- Pittsburgh Institute of Aeronautics, Myrtle Beach campus
- Miller-Motte Technical College

=== Private schools ===
Below is a list of private schools along the Grand Strand.

- St. Elizabeth Ann Seton Catholic School
- St. Andrew's Catholic School
- Christian Academy of Myrtle Beach
- Carolina Bays Academy
- Chabad Academy
- Calvary Christian School
- Bridgewater Academy
- Cathedral Hall High School
- Christian Academy
- Life Christian Academy & Child

== Communities ==
Order listed by location (north to south)

=== Horry County, South Carolina ===
- Little River - pop. 8,960 (2010, unincorporated Horry County)
- North Myrtle Beach - pop. 13,752 (2010, city)
  - Cherry Grove Beach (neighborhood, North Myrtle Beach)
  - Ocean Drive Beach (neighborhood, North Myrtle Beach)
  - Crescent Beach, South Carolina (neighborhood, North Myrtle Beach)
  - Windy Hill Beach (neighborhood, North Myrtle Beach)
- Atlantic Beach - pop. 334 (2010, town)
- Briarcliffe Acres - pop. 470 (2010, town)
- Myrtle Beach - pop. 27,109 (2010, city)
  - Springmaid Beach (neighborhood, Myrtle Beach)
- Surfside Beach - pop. 3,837 (2010, town)
- Garden City - pop. 11,014 (2010, unincorporated Horry County)

=== Georgetown County, South Carolina ===
- Murrells Inlet - pop. 8,547 (2010, unincorporated Georgetown County)
- Litchfield Beach - (unincorporated Georgetown County)
- Pawleys Island - pop. 103 (2010, town)
- DeBordieu - (unincorporated Georgetown County)
- Georgetown - pop. 9,163 (2010, city)

== Infrastructure ==
=== Air ===
- Myrtle Beach International Airport opened in 1976 and is located on the south side of town.
- The Grand Strand Airport, located in the North Myrtle Beach area, is a single-terminal airport (CRE), serving primarily banner planes and small aircraft.
- A private helicopter facility operated by Omniflight services the Grand Strand.

=== Rail ===
The closest passenger rail station to Myrtle Beach is the Amtrak Station in Florence SC, about 70 miles. Southeastern Stages does offer limited bus service from the Florence Bus Station to Myrtle Beach.

=== Roads ===
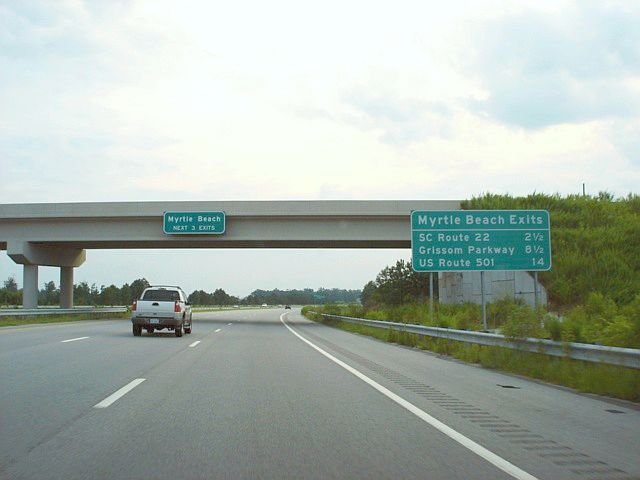
SC 31 serves as a by-pass for a majority of the Grand Strand

- US 17
- US 17 Bus.
- US 501
- SC 9
- SC 22
- SC 31
- SC 65
- SC 179
- SC 544
- SC 707
- Farrow Parkway
- Ocean Boulevard
- Harrelson Boulevard
- Robert Edge Parkway
- Robert Grissom Parkway

Within the last decade, new roads have been created to ease congestion caused by the yearly influx of visitors. Most of these roads follow the Metro Loop Road Plan, organized in 1997 to improve the traffic flow of Myrtle Beach. Some of the roads included have either been funded through RIDE I funding or through the City of Myrtle Beach.

RIDE II plans include the third phase of S.C. Highway 31, a graded separation of Farrow Parkway and US 17 Bypass at the back gate of the former Air Force base, and many other projects. The county is currently debating where to allocate the $400 million generated through a proposed 1-cent sales tax. Other road projects in Horry County, including some in Aynor and Conway, will be included when voted upon.

Plans exist for the Grand Strand area to be eventually served by two interstates, Interstate 73 and Interstate 74. The Robert Edge Parkway will connect I-74 to downtown North Myrtle Beach.

== Sports ==
The Grand Strand is home to the Myrtle Beach Pelicans, a Carolina League baseball team and Chicago Cubs farm franchise.

TicketReturn.com Field is the home field of the Myrtle Beach Pelicans and is located in Myrtle Beach. It opened in 1999 and seats 6,500 people. It is the finish point of the Bi-Lo Myrtle Beach Marathon, an athletics event held in February of each year.

TicketReturn.com Field is also home of the annual "Baseball At The Beach" collegiate baseball tournament. Hosted by Coastal Carolina University each year, the tournament pits participating NCAA Division I baseball programs in the United States.

From 1998 to 2009 and again starting in 2011 (no Saturday races were held in 2010), the area hosted the Bi-Lo Myrtle Beach Marathon presented by Chick-fil-A, every February featuring (since 2004) the Friday night Royal Bank of Canada 5K and the Saturday Dasani Half Marathon and Bi-Lo Marathon (from 1998 until 2008, a relay was held but dropped because of the popularity of the other events). Marathon day draws the limit of 6,000 runners annually (2,500 full, 3,500 half) and results usually in an unusual dawn as the race starts before dawn (6:30 AM) in order to finish by 2:30 PM.

NASCAR-sanctioned stock car racing is held at Myrtle Beach Speedway, a .538-mile (0.866 km), semi-banked, asphalt-paved oval track located on US 501. Drivers in the Late Model classes will compete (against those of Greenville-Pickens Speedway) for the South Carolina Championship in the NASCAR Whelen All-American Series. South Carolina Champions' scores will be calculated against other state and provincial champions for a continental championship.

It hosted the 2010 UOA Nationals where 8 collegiate ultimate teams from 5 conferences will be represented.

=== Golf ===
The area is home to numerous golf courses and mini-golf courses, along the Grand Strand and further inland. Myrtle Beach has been called the "Golf Capital of the World", because of the 120 golf courses once located there, the record 4.2 million rounds played, and many miniature golf courses. 3.7 million total rounds of golf were played in 2007. Since the last recession, around 30 courses have closed to make way for real estate developments, bringing the total to down to 90. The majority of the area's golf courses are public. Some of the notable golf courses and resorts include:

- Arcadian Shores Golf Club
- Arrowhead Country Club
- Azalea Sands Golf Club
- Barefoot Resort and Golf Club located in North Myrtle Beach
- Burning Ridge Golf Course
- Grande Dunes Golf Resort
- Beachwood Golf Club
- Myrtlewood Golf Club
- Myrtle Beach National Golf Course
- River Oaks Golf Plantation
- Whispering Pines Golf Course
- Crown Park Golf Club
- Carolina Shores
- Tidewater Plantation
- Caledonia Golf Club

== Media ==
=== Television ===
The Grand Strand and Florence, South Carolina share a common defined market by Nielsen Media Research in Horry, Marion, Dillon, Darlington, Marlboro, and Florence counties in South Carolina and Scotland and Robeson counties in North Carolina. Due to the Grand Strand's rapid growth, most of the television stations licensed to Florence have moved their operations to the Grand Strand.

=== Newspapers ===
The Sun News is the largest daily paper published along the Grand Strand, with a readership base extending from Georgetown, South Carolina, to Sunset Beach, North Carolina. The paper has been in existence since the 1930s and was published by Knight Ridder before that company was bought by The McClatchy Company.

There are by several weekly papers, including The Weekly Surge, the Myrtle Beach Herald, and the Horry Independent.
