= Ronnie Burgess =

American football player (1963–2021)

No. 39
- Position: Cornerback

Personal information
- Born: March 7, 1963; Sumter, South Carolina, U.S.
- Died: January 4, 2021 (aged 57); Socastee, South Carolina, U.S.
- Listed height: 5 ft 11 in (1.80 m)
- Listed weight: 174 lb (79 kg)

Career information
- High school: Sumter (Sumter, South Carolina)
- College: Wake Forest
- NFL draft: 1985: 10th round, 266th overall pick

Career history
- Green Bay Packers (1985)

Awards and highlights
- First-team All-ACC (1984)
- Stats at Pro Football Reference

Ronnie Burgess (March 7, 1963 – January 4, 2021) was an American professional football player who was a defensive back for the Green Bay Packers of the National Football League (NFL). He played college football for the Wake Forest Demon Deacons.

== Biography ==
Burgess was born on March 7, 1963, in Sumter, South Carolina, and was a graduate of Sumter High School. He died on January 4, 2021, in Socastee, South Carolina, after a cardiac arrest related to medical issues stemming from a car accident in late 2019. He was 57 years old.

== Career ==
Burgess played college football at Wake Forest University and was drafted by the Green Bay Packers in the tenth round of the 1985 NFL draft with the 266th overall pick. He played seven games for the Packers in 1985 and retired after that season.

== After football ==
Burgess served as an assistant principal at Carolina Forest High School, and was a long-time administrator with Horry County Schools, having previously served as principal of Myrtle Beach High School, St. James High School, and the Academy for the Arts, Science and Technology.
