= South Carolina Highway 707 =

State highway in South Carolina, United States

South Carolina Highway 707
- SC 707 highlighted in red

Route information
- Maintained by SCDOT
- Length: 12.645 mi (20.350 km)
- Existed: 1970s–present

Major junctions
- South end: US 17 Bus. near Murrells Inlet
- US 17 near Murrells Inlet; SC 31 in Burgess; SC 544 near Socastee
- North end: US 17 in Myrtle Beach

Location
- Country: United States
- State: South Carolina
- Counties: Georgetown, Horry

Highway system
- South Carolina State Highway System; Interstate; US; State; Scenic
← SC 703	→ SC 742

South Carolina Highway 707 (SC 707) is a 12.645-mile (20.350 km) state highway in Georgetown and Horry counties, in the northeastern part of the U.S. state of South Carolina, in the Myrtle Beach metropolitan area. It begins at U.S. Highway 17 Business (US 17 Bus.) in Murrells Inlet to US 17 across from Farrow Parkway near Socastee, South Carolina.

== Route description ==
SC 707 begins at the intersection of Sunnyside Avenue and US 17 Bus. in the Georgetown County census-designated place (CDP) of Murrells Inlet. The state highway heads west along the two-lane Sunnyside Avenue through a residential neighborhood before curving to the north and intersecting US 17 / Ocean Highway in a commercialized area. Upon crossing US 17, SC 707 continues north into Horry County where construction is proceeding to widen the highway to two lanes in each direction. The highway heads through the community of Burgess where housing developments consisting of a mix of townhouses and single family houses line the road. Some commercial businesses including restaurants, stores, and banks also front the road. SC 707 curves to the northeast and heads through a more wooded area where it passes trailer parks and St. James High School.

Continuing north, a small business district is built up around the intersection of SC 707 and Holmestown Road. After passing the entrances to additional housing developments, the highway reaches an interchange for the terminus of SC 31 (Carolina Bays Parkway). The road continues to travel northeast through a mix of treed areas and housing complexes. Entering the CDP of Socastee, SC 707 reaches the ramps to and from eastbound SC 544. SC 707 passes under SC 544 and curves to the east. At the next intersection, Dick Pond Road, access is provided to and from the westbound lanes of SC 544. SC 707 continues east on the five-lane Socastee Boulevard (two travel lanes in each direction and a center turn lane) past Socastee High School, numerous businesses, Socastee Elementary School, and trailer parks. Nearing the end, the highway sharply curves to the south at Macklen Road, enters the city limits of Myrtle Beach, and shortly thereafter ends at an interchange with US 17 outside of the Market Common. The roadway passes under US 17 and continues as Farrow Parkway.

== History ==
SC 707 began as an unpaved cow path in an area that was once largely rural. In the late 1970s, the route that SC 707 currently takes was previously signed as SC 544 from Murrells Inlet to the current intersection of Dick Pond Road in Socastee. At that time, SC 707 began at Socastee, followed Socastee Boulevard and parts of the then-unbuilt US 17 bypass north of the Myrtle Beach International Airport before terminating at US 501 on the route of the current Robert Grissom Parkway.

Much of the landscape traversed through the area was farmland until the 1980s when suburban growth began to occur outside of Myrtle Beach. Most of the growth around the area has continued into the 2000s, with development of golf courses, neighborhoods, and subdivisions being common in pockets along the length of the road.

=== Widening project ===
Because the area has experienced rapid growth within recent years, and because of increased traffic expected from the completion of SC 31 to SC 707, the South Carolina Department of Transportation (SCDOT) has decided to widen the highway from near Enterprise Road south of SC 544 to US 17 near the Horry–Georgetown county line. Much of the 9.2-mile (14.8 km) project is being funded through the one-percent Horry County sales tax increase by the 'Riding on a Penny' program. The first public meeting on the road project was held in August 2008. Right of way acquisitions were set to begin late in 2010 with construction starting in spring or summer of 2011.

However, the SC 31 extension and the SC 707 widening were combined into one project in 2010, and in March of that year changes were made to plans for the parkway. After many delays, a groundbreaking for both projects took place November 6, 2013 at the future interchange of SC 31/SC 544. The $105 million SC 707 project was expected to be finished in Spring 2017. Due to delays stemming from weather, both the SC 31 extension and SC 707 widening projects were expected to be completed in the summer of 2018.

=== Farrow Parkway interchange ===
The intersection of SC 707 with US 17 at Farrow Parkway, known as the "back gate" of the former Myrtle Beach Air Force Base, has seen increased traffic with the construction of The Market Common, expansion of the Myrtle Beach International Airport and other development on and near the former base. One of the first priorities for Horry County's program 'Riding on a Penny' was to build a grade-separated interchange connecting the two roads together. The projected cost of the project was $49,500,000. The recommended configuration of the interchange, due to limiting right-of-way space and heavy traffic demands, is a single-point urban interchange. Also, US 17 must go over a 35-foot-high, 1,200-foot-long bridge because the soil cannot support a stronger bridge without work that would have delayed the project. As of April 2010, the projected cost had more than doubled to $107 million. Interchange construction began June 6, 2011, and the projected completion date was August 2014. Soil conditions and weather caused many delays. On October 23, 2014, a ribbon cutting took place for the completion of what became a $121.7 million project. The southbound lanes opened earlier that week, and the northbound lanes were opening the next week. Pavement markings, signs and other details would not be complete until November. The project also included more turn lanes on US 17, frontage roads, and the addition of Coventry Boulevard as an alternate route around the interchange.

== Major intersections ==
County	Location	mi	km	Destinations	Notes
Georgetown	Murrells Inlet	0.000	0.000	US 17 Bus. – Murrells Inlet, Garden City	Southern terminus
Georgetown	Murrells Inlet	0.400	0.644	US 17 – Myrtle Beach, Georgetown	
Horry	Burgess	7.873	12.670	SC 31 north (Carolina Bays Parkway) – Conway, North Myrtle Beach	Interchange; southern terminus of SC 31
Horry	Socastee	9.989	16.076	SC 544 – Conway, Surfside Beach	Interchange; access to and from westbound SC 544 via Dick Pond Road
Horry	Myrtle Beach	12.645	20.350	US 17 / Farrow Parkway – Myrtle Beach, Georgetown	Northern terminus; interchange
1.000 mi = 1.609 km; 1.000 km = 0.621 mi
