= Farrow Parkway =

Parkway in South Carolina, U.S.

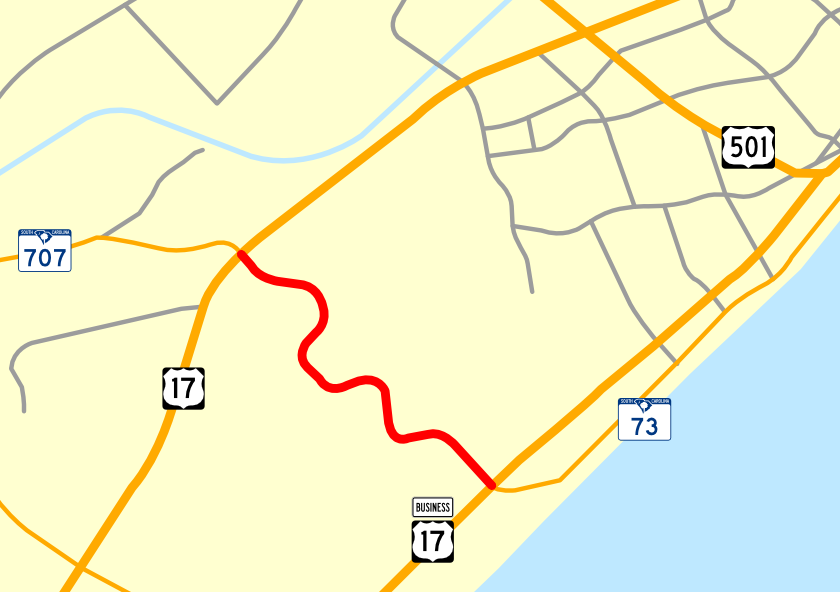

Route information
- Length: 3.5 mi (5.6 km)
- Existed: 2005–present

Major junctions
- West end: US 17 / SC 707 in Socastee
- East end: US 17 Bus. in Springmaid Beach

Location
- Country: United States
- State: South Carolina
- Counties: Horry

Highway system
- South Carolina State Highway System; Interstate; US; State; Scenic

Farrow Parkway is a four-lane, 3.5-mile (5.6 km) parkway that connects US 17 and US 17 Business in Myrtle Beach, South Carolina. The $6.9 million roadway replaced a former two-lane roadway through the former Myrtle Beach Air Force Base with funding from the city of Myrtle Beach funds and Horry County RIDE funds. Farrow Parkway is named after William G. Farrow who was a member of the Doolittle’s Raiders in World War II.

== History ==
After the Myrtle Beach Air Force Base closed, the base redevelopment authority planned to sell bonds to build the main road through the former base in November 2000, with plans to start construction in January 2001. Work was expected to take 18 months.

Phase two of the road's construction started in November 2003.

On August 1, 2005, Farrow Parkway officially opened, a "four-lane, landscaped road with sidewalks, street lamps and a grassy median" three and a half miles long, between Kings Highway near Springmaid Beach and U.S. 17 Bypass. Development along the Parkway includes The Market Common.

The intersection of Farrow Parkway and South Carolina Highway 707 with U.S. Highway 17, known as the "back gate" of the former base, has seen increased traffic with the construction of The Market Common, expansion of the Myrtle Beach International Airport and other development on and near the former base. One of the first priorities for Horry County's program 'Riding on a Penny' was to build a grade-separated interchange connecting the two roads together. The projected cost of the project was $49,500,000. The recommended configuration of the interchange, due to limiting right-of-way space and heavy traffic demands, is a single-point urban interchange. Also, U.S. 17 must go over a 35-foot-high, 1,200-foot-long bridge because the soil cannot support a stronger bridge without work that would have delayed the project. As of April 2010, the projected cost had more than doubled to $107 million. Interchange construction began June 6, 2011, and the projected completion date was August 2014. Soil conditions and weather caused many delays. On October 23, 2014, a ribbon cutting took place for the completion of what became a $121.7 million project. The southbound lanes opened earlier that week, and the northbound lanes were opening the next week. Pavement markings, signs and other details would not be complete until November. The project also included more turn lanes on U.S. 17, frontage roads, and the addition of Coventry Boulevard as an alternate route around the interchange.

In 2026 Myrtle Beach council was in the process of completing a traffic study of Farrow Parkway. On March 10, 2026, rumble strips were installed as a traffic calming measure.

== Attractions/Special Interest ==
- Withers Preserve
- Warbird Park
- The Market Common
- Horry-Georgetown Technical College (Grand Strand campus)

== Major intersections ==
The entire route is in Horry County.

Location	mi	km	Destinations	Notes
Socastee	0.0	0.0	SC 707 south – Socastee	
Socastee	1.6	2.6	US 17 – Myrtle Beach, Georgetown	
Springmaid Beach	3.5	5.6	US 17 Bus. – Myrtle Beach, Surfside Beach	
1.000 mi = 1.609 km; 1.000 km = 0.621 mi
