= Viers =

Viers may refer to:

- Viers, Virginia, an unincorporated community in Dickenson County, Virginia, United States
- Thad Viers (born 1978), American politician
