= Red Hill, South Carolina =

- Census-designated place
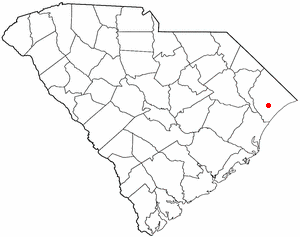
- Location in South Carolina
- Coordinates: 33°46′28″N 79°00′15″W
- Country: United States
- State: South Carolina
- County: Horry

Area
  - Total: 11.09 sq mi (28.72 km^{2})
  - Land: 11.01 sq mi (28.52 km^{2})
  - Water: 0.077 sq mi (0.20 km^{2})
- Elevation: 36 ft (11 m)

Population (2020)
  - Total: 15,906
  - Density: 1,444.7/sq mi (557.81/km^{2})
- Time zone: UTC−5 (EST)
  - Summer (DST): UTC−4 (EDT)
- ZIP codes: 29526-29527, 29579, 29588
- FIPS code: 45-59190
- GNIS feature ID: 2403464

Red Hill is a census-designated place (CDP) in Horry County, South Carolina, United States. The population was 13,223 at the 2010 census, up from 10,509 at the 2000 census.

== Geography ==
Red Hill is in south-central Horry County and is bordered to the north by the city of Conway, the county seat, and to the south by Socastee. U.S. Route 501 passes through the northern part of Red Hill, connecting Conway to the north with Myrtle Beach, 12 miles (19 km) to the southeast. South Carolina Highway 544 runs north–south the length of Red Hill, connecting Conway with Socastee. The west side of Red Hill is bordered by the Waccamaw National Wildlife Refuge.

According to the United States Census Bureau, the CDP has a total area of 11.4 square miles (29.4 km^{2}), of which 11.3 square miles (29.2 km^{2}) are land and 0.1 square miles (0.2 km^{2}), or 0.52%, are water.

== Demographics ==
Historical population
Census	Pop.	Note	%±
2000	10,509		—
2010	13,223		25.8%
2020	15,906		20.3%
U.S. Decennial Census

=== 2020 census ===
Red Hill racial composition
Race	Num.	Perc.
White (non-Hispanic)	11,308	71.09%
Black or African American (non-Hispanic)	1,753	11.02%
Native American	60	0.38%
Asian	250	1.57%
Pacific Islander	8	0.05%
Other/Mixed	778	4.89%
Hispanic or Latino	1,749	11.0%

As of the 2020 census, Red Hill had a population of 15,906. The median age was 45.4 years. 18.1% of residents were under the age of 18 and 25.7% were 65 years of age or older. For every 100 females, there were 94.1 males, and for every 100 females age 18 and over, there were 92.8 males.

94.4% of residents lived in urban areas, while 5.6% lived in rural areas.

There were 6,516 households in Red Hill, including 3,980 families. Of all households, 23.5% had children under the age of 18 living in them, 47.5% were married-couple households, 17.7% were households with a male householder and no spouse or partner present, and 27.9% were households with a female householder and no spouse or partner present. About 26.6% of all households were made up of individuals, and 13.6% had someone living alone who was 65 years of age or older.

There were 7,293 housing units, of which 10.7% were vacant. The homeowner vacancy rate was 1.8% and the rental vacancy rate was 10.4%.

=== 2000 census ===
At the 2000 census there were 10,509 people, 4,189 households, and 3,066 families living in the CDP. The population density was 961.4 inhabitants per square mile (371.2/km^{2}). There were 5,026 housing units at an average density of 459.8 per square mile (177.5/km^{2}). The racial makeup of the CDP was 88.70% White, 7.34% African American, 0.59% Native American, 0.78% Asian, 0.08% Pacific Islander, 1.22% from other races, and 1.30% from two or more races. Hispanic or Latino of any race were 3.11%.

Of the 4,189 households 31.3% had children under the age of 18 living with them, 58.1% were married couples living together, 11.4% had a female householder with no husband present, and 26.8% were non-families. 19.4% of households were one person and 6.4% were one person aged 65 or older. The average household size was 2.50 and the average family size was 2.83.

The age distribution was 23.5% under the age of 18, 9.2% from 18 to 24, 29.3% from 25 to 44, 23.1% from 45 to 64, and 14.7% 65 or older. The median age was 37 years. For every 100 females, there were 94.8 males. For every 100 females age 18 and over, there were 92.5 males.

The median household income was $37,736 and the median family income was $44,085. Males had a median income of $30,123 versus $21,750 for females. The per capita income for the CDP was $20,036. About 8.2% of families and 12.0% of the population were below the poverty line, including 14.5% of those under age 18 and 6.9% of those age 65 or over.

== Education ==
Horry County School District is the sole school district in the county.
