= TPC of Myrtle Beach =

Golf resort in Burgess, South Carolina

Club information
- Location: Murrells Inlet, South Carolina, United States
- Established: 1999
- Type: Resort
- Total holes: 18
- Tournaments: IR Senior Tour Championship (2000)
- Website: tpcmyrtlebeach.com
- Designed by: Tom Fazio
- Par: 72
- Length: 6,950 yards
- Course rating: 74.2/146
- Course record: 62 - Bo Hoag

TPC of Myrtle Beach is a golf resort located off South Carolina Highway 707 in Burgess, South Carolina, near Murrells Inlet in the Myrtle Beach metropolitan area. The Tom Fazio designed championship golf course is a member of the PGA Tour's Tournament Players Club network. It has hosted several prestigious golf tournaments, including the IR Senior Tour Championship, the season ending event on the Senior PGA Tour, in 2000.

The course at TPC of Myrtle Beach is parkland-style. Golf facilities at the club include a driving range, putting green, practice bunker, and chipping green.
