= AAST =

AAST or Aast may refer to:

- Academy for the Arts, Science and Technology, a branch school of the Horry County Schools system
- Arab Academy for Science and Technology and Maritime Transport, a maritime academy that has its main campus located in Alexandria, Egypt
- Aast, Pyrénées-Atlantiques, a commune of the Pyrénées-Atlantiques département, in southwestern France
- Academy for the Advancement of Science and Technology, part of high school Bergen County Academies in New Jersey, US
- The American Association for the Surgery of Trauma, an organization that furthers the study and practice of trauma surgery
- American Association of Sleep Technologists, an organization that promotes the interests of sleep technologists
