= Burgess, South Carolina =

Coordinates: 33°36′24″N 79°03′20″W

- Unincorporated Community
- Nicknames: Burgess Community, The Burgess Community
- Interactive map of Burgess, South Carolina
- Country: United States
- State: South Carolina
- County: Horry County
- Founded as Marlow: May 6, 1880
- Named changed to Burgess: Aug 15, 1906

Area
  - Total: 28 sq mi (73 km^{2})

Population (2018-2019)
  - Total: 31,037
- Time zone: UTC−5 (EST)
  - Summer (DST): UTC−4 (EDT)
- ZIP Code: 29576 and 29588
- Area code: 843
- GNIS feature ID: 1221130
- Website: The Greater Burgess Community Association

Burgess is an unincorporated community in Horry County, South Carolina, United States, along South Carolina Highway 707 and is located between the southern boundary between Horry and Georgetown counties. Burgess is roughly 28 square miles in area and is flanked on the west by the Waccamaw River and U.S. 17 Bypass to the east. Burgess appears on the Brookgreen Gardens U.S. Geological Survey Map.

== History ==
Originally called Marlow for the first postmaster, John W Marlow, who was appointed 6 May 1880. He was replaced by Jasper E Kennedy (his brother-in-law) in 1881, William H. Page in 1883, Christopher C. Marlow (John W Marlow's son) in 1884, and William Burgess in 16 Apr 1887. William Burgess remained the postmaster until his death 25 Sep 1934, and successfully changed the name to Burgess 15 Aug 1906. During the late 1890s Burgess was an African American farming community.

According to the 1990 census, the Burgess Community population was approximately 3,000, then grew to 25,000 according to the 2010 census. Burgess during the last 20 years has transitioned from a rural community to a predominantly suburban community. Numerous master planned communities have been developed since 1990 such as TPC, Blackmoor and Laurel Woods. There are large tracts of land that remain undeveloped which retains some of the rural characteristics that preceded its rapid growth. Burgess also has a community center called Burgess Community Center located on South Carolina Highway 707 near Mt. Zion Church and St. James Middle School and just down the street from St. James High School.

== Major roads/highways ==
- South Carolina Highway 707
- South Carolina Highway 31

== Schools ==
- St. James High School
- St. James Middle School
- St. James Elementary School
- St. James Intermediate School
- Burgess Elementary School
