= Ocean Boulevard =

Ocean Boulevard may refer to:

- Florida State Road A1A, a road
- New Hampshire Route 1A, a road
- South Carolina Highway 73, a road
- East Ocean Boulevard (Long Beach, California), a road
- 461 Ocean Boulevard, an Eric Clapton album
- Did You Know That There's a Tunnel Under Ocean Blvd, a Lana Del Rey album
