= South Carolina Highway 544 =

State highway in South Carolina, United States

South Carolina Highway 544
- Dick Pond Road; Corp. Dennis Lyden Memorial Highway
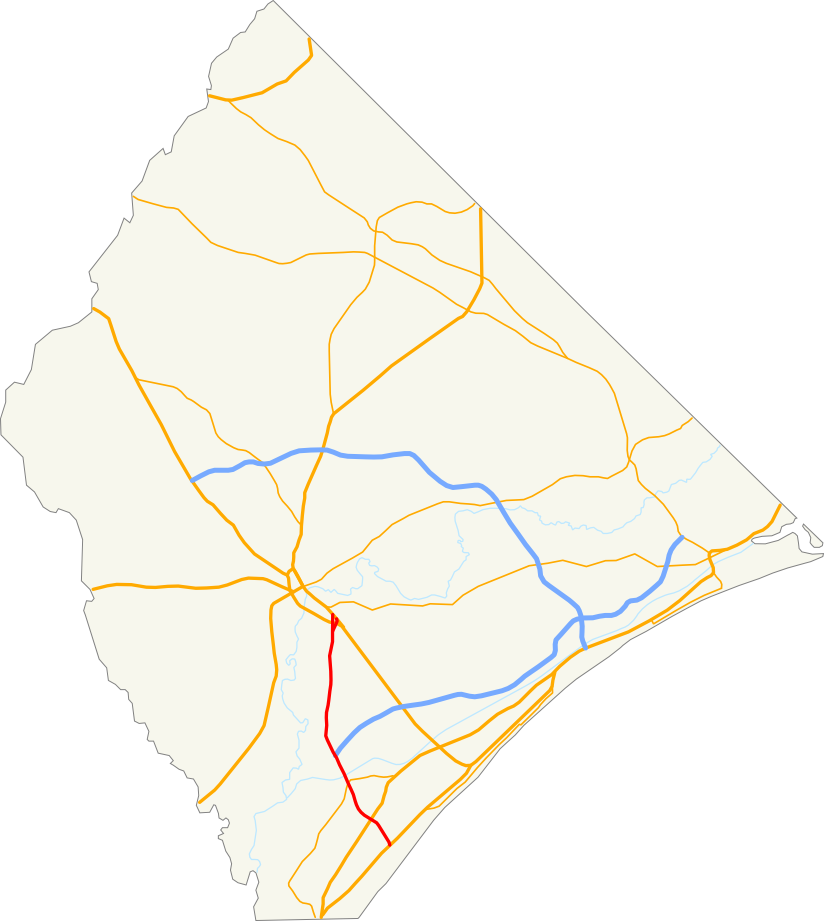

Route information
- Maintained by SCDOT
- Length: 13.710 mi (22.064 km)
- Existed: 1956–present

Major junctions
- West end: US 501 Bus. in Red Hill
- US 501 in Red Hill; SC 31 in Socastee; US 17 in Socastee
- East end: US 17 Bus. northeast of Surfside Beach

Location
- Country: United States
- State: South Carolina
- Counties: Horry

Highway system
- South Carolina State Highway System; Interstate; US; State; Scenic
← SC 541	→ SC 555

South Carolina Highway 544 (SC 544) is a 13.710-mile (22.064 km) major four-lane state highway in Horry County, South Carolina, United States. It connects the Surfside Beach and Conway areas. The highway in places and its former alignment in the Socastee area are called Dick Pond Road; Dick Pond is a water feature near its east end.

== Route description ==
SC 544 begins at an intersection with U.S. Route 501 Business (US 501 Bus.) in Red Hill, near Conway, and ends at US 17 Bus. northeast of Surfside Beach. SC 544 is one of the most frequently traversed highways in the Myrtle Beach metropolitan area. It travels in a south–north direction and parallels US 501 for most of its route, although it is signposted east–west.

== History ==
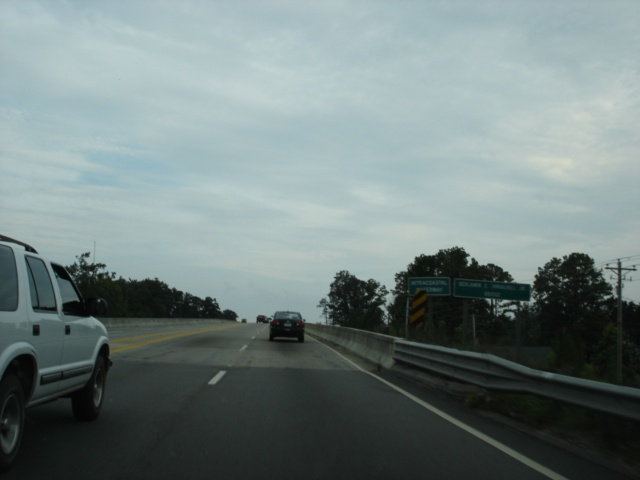
South Carolina Highway 544 going over the Intracoastal Waterway in Socastee

Part of the current routing of SC 544 was the first route between Conway and Myrtle Beach, built in the late 1930s. When the Intracoastal Waterway was dug, the swing bridge in Socastee was also built. US 501 was signed on this route from Conway running south to Socastee. At Socastee, the road followed an east–west direction along the current route of SC 707 through Socastee, continuing through the area that is currently the Myrtle Beach International Airport, and ending near downtown Myrtle Beach on the road that is now Broadway Street. A more direct and wider route running diagonally between Conway and Myrtle Beach was built in the early 1960s, replacing SC 503 through the former Conway Bombing and Gunnery Range. US 501 was signed on this path, and SC 544 and SC 707 were created to replace the old route of US 501.

A bridge over the Intracoastal Waterway next to the swing bridge was built for a new alignment of SC 544 in 1993.

Public meetings by the South Carolina Department of Transportation took place in September 1999 to discuss the widening of SC 544 to a four-lane highway from US 501 in Conway to the Intracoastal Waterway, including sidewalks and gutters throughout most of the route. A 90-foot right-of-way was required for the expansion, and the Federal Highway Administration approved the Finding of No Significant Impact report in January 2000. In February 2001, the road was named in honor of Corporal Dennis Lyden, who was killed on the road in June 2000. Limited areas of six lanes were constructed near the intersection with Phase II of S.C. Highway 31, approved for construction in January 2002.

SC 544 is notable for traversing through many diverse areas of the Myrtle Beach metropolitan area, including Coastal Carolina University, several golf courses, many suburban bedroom communities, historic Socastee, and the tourist-oriented areas near Surfside Beach and the Atlantic Ocean.

== Major intersections ==
The entire route is in Horry County.

Location	mi	km	Destinations	Notes
Red Hill	0.000	0.000	US 501 Bus. north to US 701 north / SC 90 – Conway Business District, Conway Historic District, River Front	Western terminus
Red Hill	0.260	0.418	US 501 to US 378 – Myrtle Beach, Marion, Sumter	Access only from SC 544 westbound to US 501 northbound and SC 544 eastbound to US 501 southbound
Red Hill	0.490	0.789	Cox Ferry Road (SC 544 Conn.) to US 501 south – Myrtle Beach	
Red Hill	0.720	1.159	SC 544 Conn. north	No access from SC 544 to SC 544 Conn., access from SC 544 Conn. to SC 544 eastbound only
Socastee	7.830	12.601	SC 31 – North Myrtle Beach, Georgetown	Thomas G. Keegan Interchange
Socastee	9.014	14.507	Benjamin E. Thrailkill Jr. Bridge over SC 707, the Intracoastal Waterway, and Peachtree Road	
Socastee	9.700	15.611	707 Connector (state secondary highway S-26-1377) to SC 707 – Murrells Inlet, Socastee	Access to and from SC 544 eastbound only
Socastee	9.860	15.868	Dick Pond Road north to SC 707 – Socastee	Former SC 544
Socastee	12.660	20.374	US 17 – Georgetown, Myrtle Beach	Nelson Jackson Memorial Interchange; provides access to Myrtle Beach International Airport
	13.710	22.064	US 17 Bus. – Surfside Beach, Garden City Beach, Murrells Inlet, Myrtle Beach	Eastern terminus
1.000 mi = 1.609 km; 1.000 km = 0.621 mi: Incomplete access

== Special routes ==
=== Red Hill connector route 1 ===
South Carolina Highway 544 Connector
- Location: Red Hill, South Carolina
- Length: 0.860 mi (1,384 m)

South Carolina Highway 544 Connector (SC 544 Conn.) is a 0.860-mile (1.384 km) connector route in the northern part of Red Hill. It is unnamed and is an unsigned highway.

It begins at an intersection with the SC 544 mainline. There is no access from SC 544 to SC 544 Conn., since it is blocked by barricades. It travels nearly due north and immediately intersects Cox Ferry Road, which is the western terminus of a separate connector route. Then, it intersects U.S. Route 501 (US 501). Here, US 378 Truck, US 701 Truck, and SC 90 Truck begin a concurrency with the connector route. An intersection with the eastern terminus of El Paso Drive leads to Waccamaw Elementary School. The highway curves to the northeast and reaches its northern terminus, an intersection with US 501 Business (US 501 Bus.). Here, the roadway continues as French Collins Road. Also, the truck routes turn left onto the business route.

The entire route is in Red Hill, Horry County.

mi	km	Destinations	Notes
0.000	0.000	SC 544	No access from SC 544 to SC 544 Conn.; southern terminus
0.180	0.290	Cox Ferry Road (SC 544 Conn. east)	Western terminus of SC 544 Conn.
0.450	0.724	US 378 Truck west / US 501 / US 701 Truck south (SC 90 Truck west)	Southern end of US 378 Truck/US 701 Truck/SC 90 Truck concurrency
0.860	1.384	US 378 Truck east / US 501 Bus. / US 701 Truck north / SC 90 Truck east to SC 90 / French Collins Road east	Northern end of US 378 Truck/US 701 Truck/SC 90 Truck concurrency; northern terminus of SC 544 Conn.; western terminus of French Collins Road
1.000 mi = 1.609 km; 1.000 km = 0.621 mi: Concurrency terminus; Incomplete access

=== Red Hill connector route 2 ===
South Carolina Highway 544 Connector
- Location: Red Hill, South Carolina
- Length: 0.500 mi (805 m)

South Carolina Highway 544 Connector (SC 544 Conn.) is a 0.500-mile (0.805 km) connector route in the northern part of Red Hill. It is named Cox Ferry Road but is an unsigned highway. It begins at an intersection with a different connector route. Here, Cox Ferry Road continues to the west-southwest. The highway travels to the east-northeast and immediately intersects the SC 544 mainline. The highway then travels through a residential area before reaching its eastern terminus, an intersection with U.S. Route 501 (US 501). Here, Cox Ferry Road continues past the terminus.

The entire route is in Red Hill, Horry County.

mi	km	Destinations	Notes
0.000	0.000	SC 544 Conn. / Cox Ferry Road west	Western terminus; Cox Ferry Road continues past terminus.
0.080	0.129	SC 544	
0.500	0.805	US 501 / Cox Ferry Road east	Eastern terminus; Cox Ferry Road continues past terminus.
1.000 mi = 1.609 km; 1.000 km = 0.621 mi
