= Scholars Academy =

Location
- 104 Chanticleer Drive East; Conway, Horry County, South Carolina 29526; United States
- Coordinates: 33°47′46.0″N 79°00′31.1″W

Information
- School type: Advanced public high school
- Motto: Sapere Aude
- Founded: August 2003 (22 years ago)
- Oversight: Horry County Schools
- Superintendent: Clifford Jones
- Principal: Norman McQueen
- Grades: 9–12
- Enrollment: 200
- Colors: Teal and Bronze
- Rival: Horry County Schools
- Yearbook: The Aegis
- Website: www.horrycountyschools.net/Scholar_s_Academy

Scholars Academy is a four-year public high school institution located in Conway, South Carolina at Coastal Carolina University. The school was established as part of Horry County Schools for gifted education in 2003. It was named the number one high school in South Carolina for the 2023-2024 school year and the 2024-2025 school year.

== See also ==
- Horry County Schools
- Coastal Carolina University
