= Waties Island, South Carolina =

Undeveloped barrier island in South Carolina, U.S.

Coordinates: 33°50′56″N 78°34′29″W

Waties Island is an undeveloped barrier island in the eastern coast of South Carolina. It is under the jurisdiction of Coastal Carolina University and is used primarily as an educational research facility.

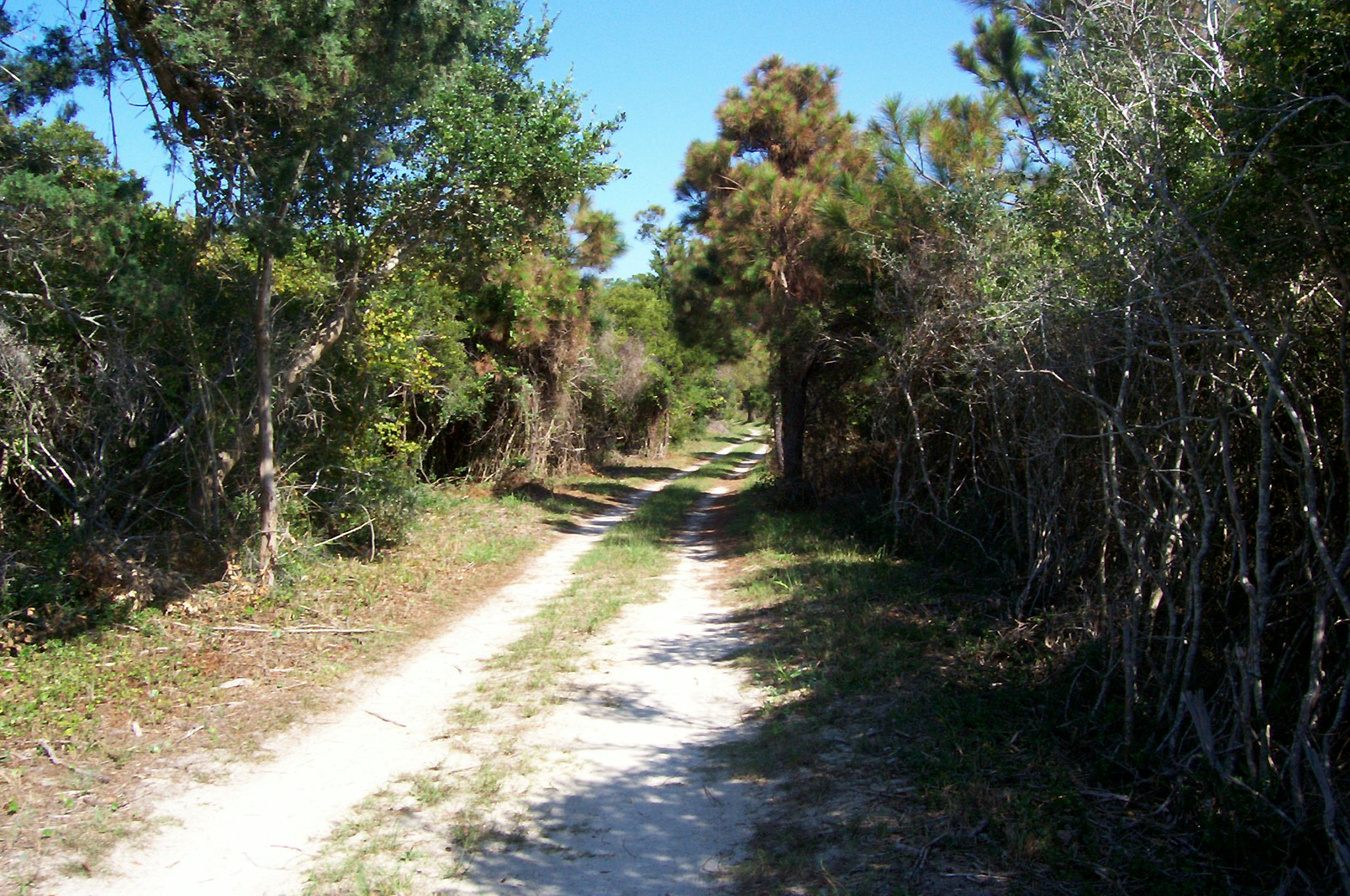
Maritime forest on Waties Island

== History ==
Waties Island is named for either William Waties Jr. or Sr., who searched out and claimed large tracts of land in the Waccamaw, Pee Dee, and Horry/Georgetown areas.

The island was inhabited by the Waccamaw Indians prior to the arrival of Europeans. The area was originally given to James Minor via a land grant, eventually coming into possession by Waties' family. For a short period, the island was known as Waiters Island on maps, due to a typographical error. The land was purchased in the 1920s by Horace Tilghman and given to Coastal Carolina University as a grant by his daughter, Anne.

== Significance ==
Waties Island is, for the most part, land untouched by human development. This is the result of the entire mass tending to fall under the jurisdiction of a single family or facility who choose not to develop it or have a distinct purpose in keeping the island undeveloped. This underdevelopment of the island contrasts sharply with the surrounding Grand Strand area, a beach region that is mostly developed. In addition, Waties Island is a barrier island with a significantly varying climate and ecology compared to the surrounding city land. It is one of the last remaining undeveloped barrier islands on the South Carolina coast. These factors have contributed to its use as a research area by students and faculty of Coastal Carolina University. The island has a conservation easement with The Nature Conservancy placed on it.

Apart from its significance as an ecological research facility, it also has a rich anthropological history. The island is home to many American Indian artifacts, including burial mounds and ceramics.

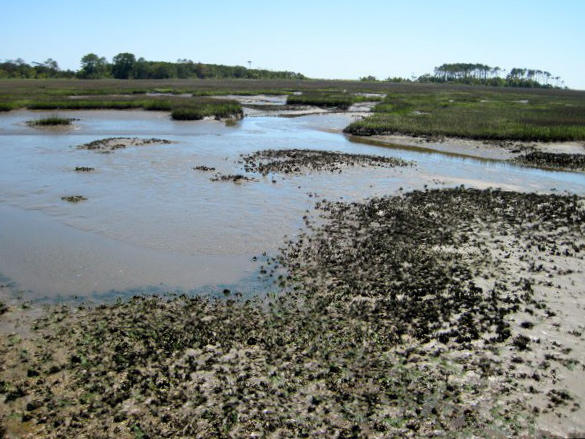
Salt marsh at Waties Island

== Sources ==
- CCU Official Website for Waties Island
- Google Maps Overview
- Topographic Map - TIFF TFW FGD TIGER
- Ben's Page - A collection of documents from Ben Burroughs, Research Specialist (local history) at CCU.
