= South Carolina Highway 73 =

State highway in South Carolina

Coordinates: 35.3639899°N 80.2610317°W

South Carolina Highway 73
- Ocean Boulevard

Route information
- Maintained by City of Myrtle Beach
- Length: 14 mi (23 km)
- Existed: 1960–2006

Major junctions
- South end: US 17 Bus. near Springmaid Beach
- North end: US 17 Bus. in Myrtle Beach

Location
- Country: United States
- State: South Carolina
- Counties: Horry

Highway system
- South Carolina State Highway System; Interstate; US; State; Scenic
← SC 72	→ SC 75

South Carolina Highway 73 (SC 73) was a primary state highway in the U.S. state of South Carolina. Established five times in the state, from 1926 to 2006, its last routing was along Ocean Boulevard, in Myrtle Beach, a popular stretch of road lined with hotels, shops, tourist sites and access to the beach.

== Route description ==
SC 73 began and ended at US 17 Bus., with the southern terminus at Springmaid Beach and the northern terminus in the northern part of Myrtle Beach.

Ocean Boulevard is a major point during the annual Bi-Lo Marathon; full and half marathon runners head south during the first loop of the course, and for full marathon runners only, they head northbound for the second loop. Together, about nine miles (14 km) of the entire marathon course is run on Ocean Boulevard.

== History ==
On October 12, 2004, the Myrtle Beach City Council voted to take over ownership of S.C. 73 from the SCDOT, along with other streets that only connected to S.C. 73 on the city's north end. It is no longer an official state route. As such, the route is no longer signed and, as of 2008, the route no longer appears on the official state highway map.

== Major intersections ==
The entire route is in Horry County.

Location	mi	km	Destinations	Notes
Springmaid Beach	0	0.0	US 17 Bus. (Farrow Parkway)	Southern terminus
Myrtle Beach	14	23	US 17 Bus.	Northern terminus
1.000 mi = 1.609 km; 1.000 km = 0.621 mi
