= Socastee Historic District =

Historic district in South Carolina, United States

- U.S. National Register of Historic Places
- U.S. Historic district
- Map: Courtesy of South Carolina Department of Archives and History

- Location within South Carolina Location within the United States
- Location: SC 544, 0.5 mi. N of Intracoastal Waterway, Socastee, South Carolina
- Coordinates: 33°41′30″N 79°00′30″W
- Area: 4 acres (1.6 ha)
- Built: 1881
- Architect: Prince, Robert M., Sr.; Tidewater Construction Corporation
- Architectural style: Massed-plan side gabled
- NRHP reference No.: 02000558
- Added to NRHP: May 22, 2002

The Socastee Historic District, located on the Intracoastal Waterway in Socastee, South Carolina, was added to the National Register of Historic Places in 2002.

It includes three contributing buildings, one contributing site, and one contributing structure. They are a metal swing bridge, two houses, one store and a pecan grove. It is one of the few remaining intact local examples of post-Civil War development.

== Samuel S. Sarvis House ==
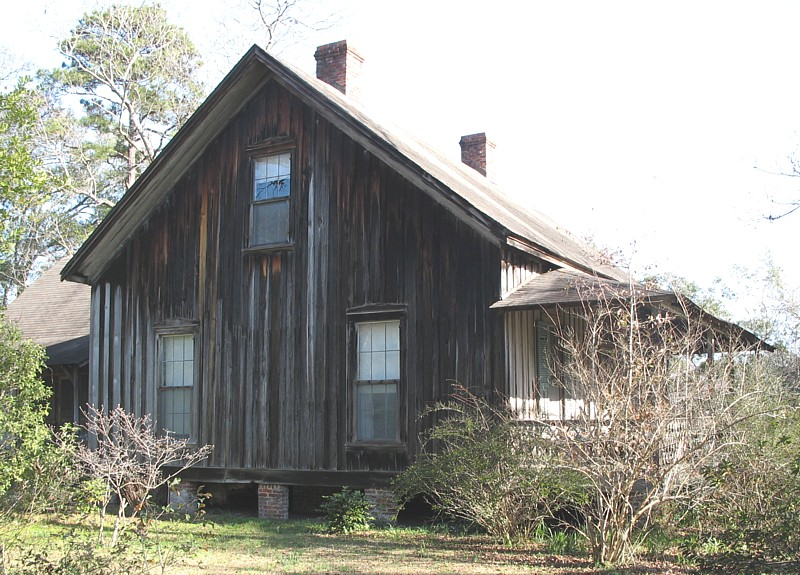
Samuel S. Sarvis house

Samuel Sarvis built his house in 1881, shortly before he was to be married.

== Thomas B. Cooper House ==
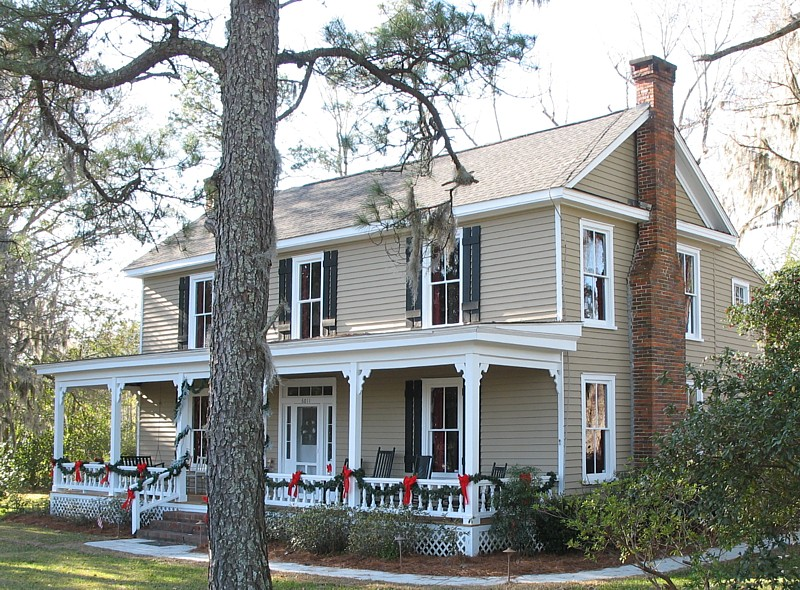
Thomas B. Cooper house

The Thomas B. Cooper house was built for Mr. Cooper by Robert M. Prince, Jr. in 1908. The exterior has been renovated. As of 2026, Chris and Brianna Throckmorton are using it as a wedding venue.

== Thomas B. Cooper Store ==
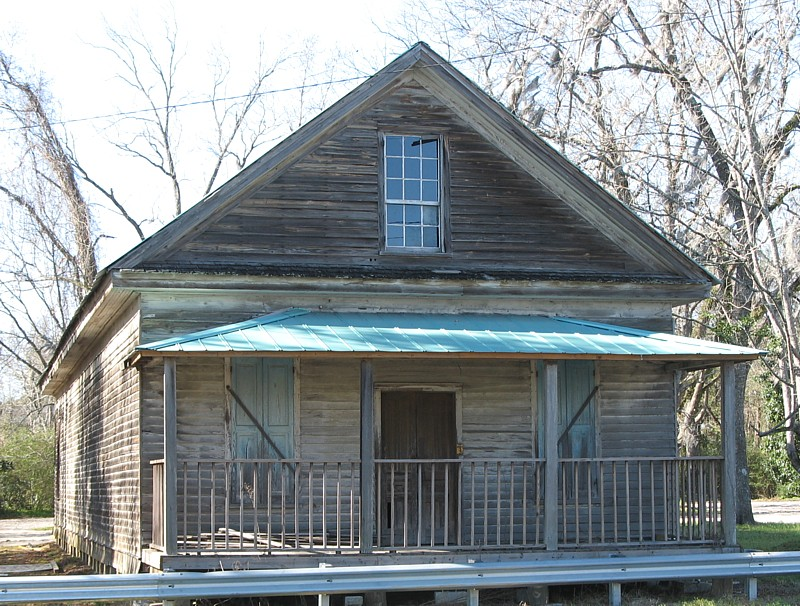
Thomas B. Cooper store

The store was built in 1905. The area's first post office was there, and in 1908, Thomas Cooper served as postmaster. The post office counter remains. As of 2026, Chris and Brianna Throckmorton are planning to use the property as a wedding and event venue.

== Swing bridge ==
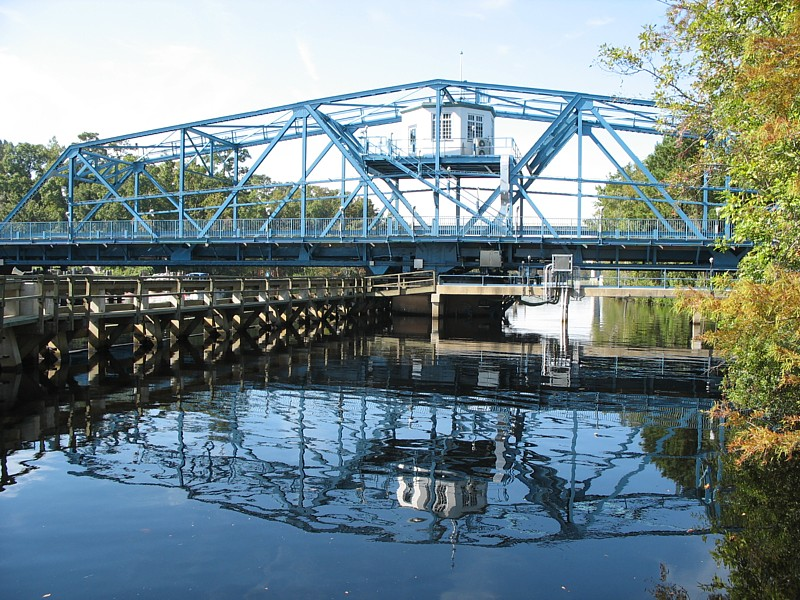
Socastee swing bridge

The Socastee swing bridge was designed by the United States Army Corps of Engineers. It is a swing-span, Warren through-truss type bridge with rigid joints and was opened in 1936. It is 217 feet (66 m) long and 24 feet (7.3 m) feet wide. A pamphlet printed for the opening of the Waterway in Socastee in 1936 discloses the Socastee bridge was built by the Tidewater Construction Corporation; according to a 1981 South Carolina Highway Department Survey, however, the bridge contains a plate bearing the name of Virginia Bridge & Iron Company. It is most likely the pieces for the bridge itself was fabricated by the Virginia Bridge & Iron Company, and was assembled by Tidewater Construction Corporation. Originally, the bridge had to be turned by hand. The gatekeeper worked from the house at the top of the bridge. The first operator of the bridge boarded at the Thomas B. Cooper house.

From the time of its construction, the Socastee turn bridge was the only means other than ferry to cross the Intra Coastal waterway. Located on Highway 544, it was to be closed after approval of a new bridge to be built on south of the Socastee bridge. Though the new bridge solved many traffic problems during the tourist season, it did not help the locals and it would have created many problems for Socastee residents that need to access Forestbrook Road, which is located approximately 0.2 miles on the right off Hwy. 544 west of the Socastee turn bridge. Additionally Peach Tree Road was located just 0.1 miles to the left. Thus the Socastee turn bridge not only has historic value, but it is still used in daily commuting.

The swing bridge has been used in several television shows and films.

== Pecan Grove ==
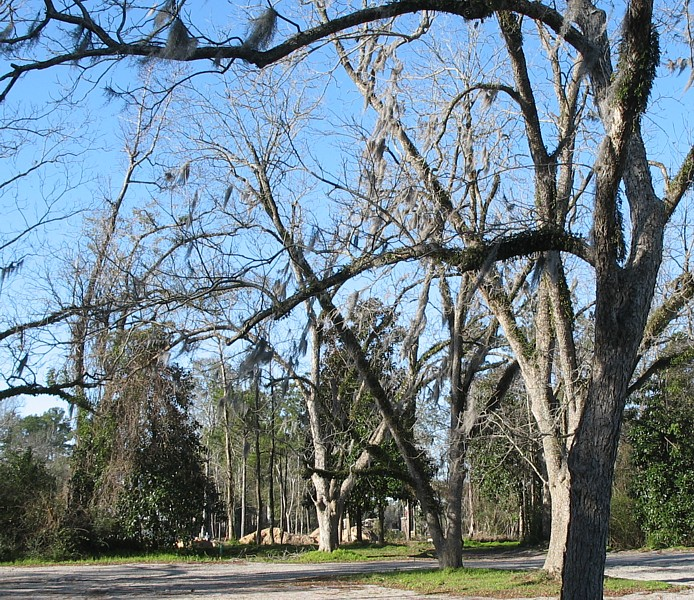
Pecan grove

Old pecan grove near the Thomas B. Cooper store.

== Early residents ==
=== Samuel S. Sarvis (1843 - 1931) ===
Samuel S. Sarvis was a confederate veteran and served with the SC 26th Infantry. He was a merchant, store owner and a business partner with Dusenbury & Sarvis. Mr. Sarvis was appointed the postmaster of Socastee in 1896. The post office was in his store which was the norm for small towns in that era.

=== Thomas B. Cooper (1863 - 1928) ===
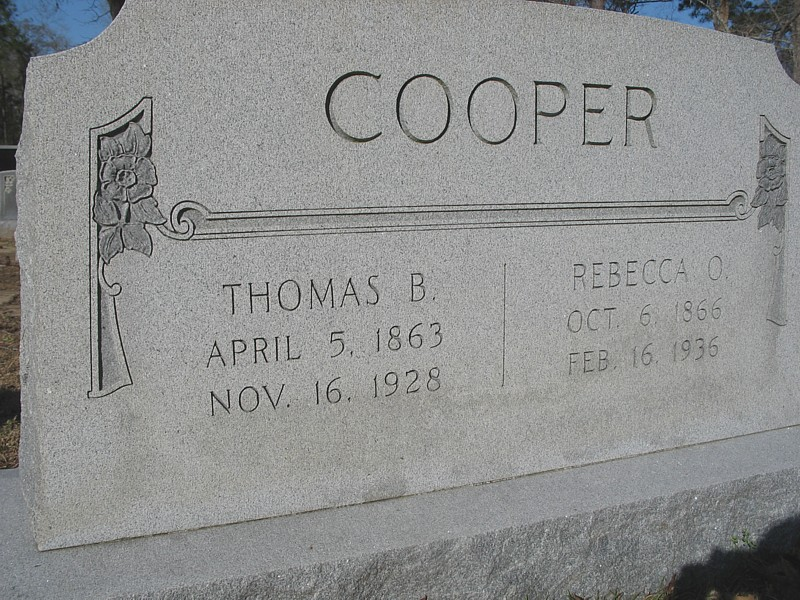
Thomas B. Cooper grave Socastee UMC Cemetery

Thomas B. Cooper was the Socastee postmaster in 1908.
