= Hunter Renfro =

Hunter Renfro may refer to:

- Hunter Renfroe (born 1992), American baseball player
- Hunter Renfrow (born 1995), American football player
