= Surfside Beach, South Carolina =

- Town
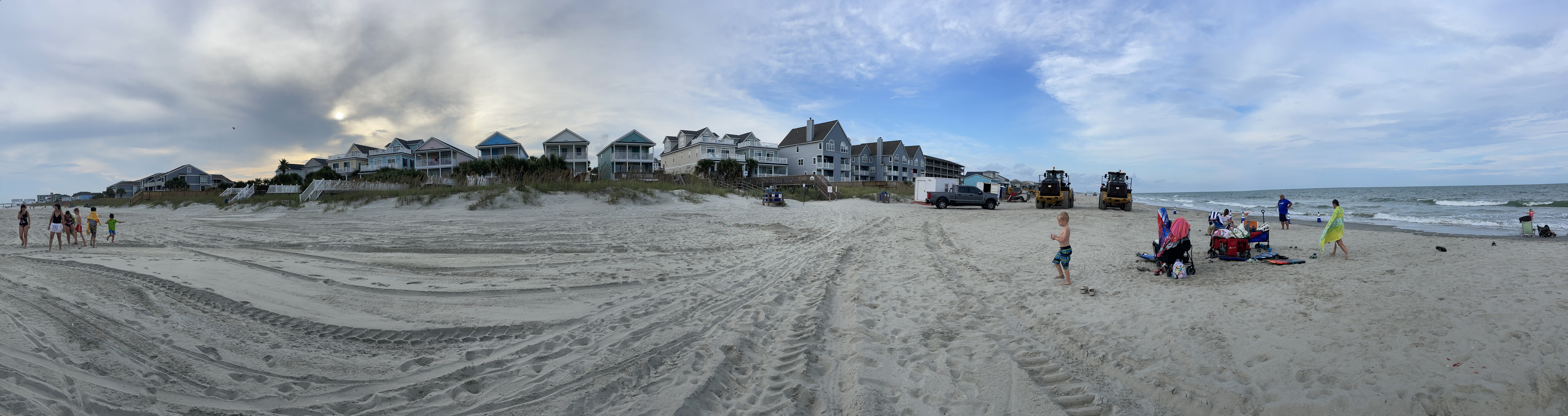
- Surfside Beach shoreline

- Seal
- Nickname: The Family Beach
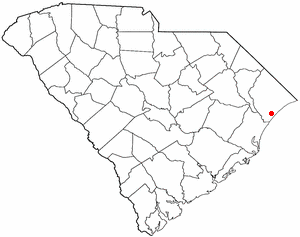
- Location in Horry County, South Carolina
- Coordinates: 33°36′54″N 78°58′23″W
- Country: United States
- State: South Carolina
- County: Horry

Area
  - Total: 1.97 sq mi (5.09 km^{2})
  - Land: 1.95 sq mi (5.05 km^{2})
  - Water: 0.015 sq mi (0.04 km^{2})
- Elevation: 16 ft (4.9 m)

Population (2020)
  - Total: 4,155
  - Density: 2,132.7/sq mi (823.44/km^{2})
- Time zone: UTC-5 (EST)
  - Summer (DST): UTC-4 (EDT)
- ZIP codes: 29575, 29587
- Area codes: 843, 854
- FIPS code: 45-70585
- GNIS feature ID: 2406696
- Website: www.surfsidebeach.org

Surfside Beach is a town in Horry County, South Carolina, United States. Its nickname is "The Family Beach". The population was 4,155 at the 2020 census, up from 3,837 in 2010. It is considered a part of the Grand Strand.

== Geography ==
According to the United States Census Bureau Surfside Beach has a total area of 2.0 square miles (5.1 km^{2}), of which 1.9 square miles (5.0 km^{2}) is land and 0.02 square mile (0.04 km^{2}) (0.87%) is water.

== History ==
=== 18th and 19th centuries ===
In the early nineteenth century, there is evidence of a slave plantation of 3,200 acres (1838) at what is now Surfside Beach. There are traveler accounts from the eighteenth century of the area. The 1765 diary of John Bartram, botanist, shows him lodging at what was probably Stephen Peak's slave plantation, "at the west end of long bay". In 1773, William Bartram, naturalist, also "got to the West end of Long Bay, where [he] lodged at a large Indigo plantation". The plantation in question was called "The Ark", a name for which the first record is in 1867; it may have originally been owned by "Mr. Aark". In 1820 it was owned by John Tillman. The 1838 survey recorded it having 3,194 acres. The plantation reported 57 enslaved people in 1850 and 63 in 1860. In 1850 the crops were sweet potatoes and rice. Other farmed animals and crops are thought to have included cattle, sheep, pigs, Indian corn and peas.

The main house was near the ocean front (at 3rd Ave South and Willow Drive in present-day Surfside Beach), with several buildings for slave quarters to the north along the ocean and a cemetery behind it (South Hollywood Dr on the west, to Juniper Drive on the north, to 6th Ave South on the east, to Cypress Drive on the south). The main house had four large rooms and was made of timber; it was used as shelter during a hurricane in 1893.

=== 20th century ===
The main house became a hotel, and then a shelter for lifeguards, before it was demolished in the 1960s. The cemetery, where many of the enslaved people of the plantation were buried, continued to be used by descendants of those families until the 1950s. In 1980, the town of Surfside Beach declared it abandoned, opening the area for development. There are now houses on the site, which have destroyed most of the cemetery, though some graves are still visible, and in 2022 markers and memorials were put up.

Surfside Beach was previously known as Roach's Beach and had only a few buildings surviving the hurricane of 1893. Principal industries were lumber and feed farming for the 30 or so horses and mules in the area. The new owner, George J. Holiday of Galivants Ferry, renamed the area Floral Beach after his wife, Flora. He built a sawmill and opened a hotel in the old house of the plantation, the Tillman house.

Holiday sold the land to a group from Columbia who partially developed the land. In 1952, most of the land changed hands again and became known as Surfside Beach. A pier was built in 1953.

Hurricane Hazel in 1954 destroyed most of the beach's seventy houses and the pier. In 1976 the Department of Housing and Urban Development noted that the town "is subject to serious flooding from tidal surge caused by hurricanes and tidal storms"; there had been significant storms or hurricanes in 1872, 1874, 1883, 1893, 1894, 1899, 1906, and 1944, as well as Hurricane Hazel, and no flood defenses were in place or planned. Development plans continued. By 1956 there were six families living permanently on the beach, with others coming on vacation. The settlement expanded after the reactivation of Myrtle Beach Air Force Base in 1956. The town was incorporated in 1964. It had 881 residents at that point. Municipal annexation led to growth of the settlement.

=== 21st century ===
Surfside Beach adopted a public-places smoking ban which took effect October 1, 2007. Surfside Beach is the first town in Horry County to enact such a ban, and one of only a handful in South Carolina to do so at the time.

On February 4, 2023, at 2:39 PM local time, a Chinese spy balloon that had been flying across the United States for days was shot down directly over the town's coast by an AIM-9X Sidewinder launched from a Lockheed Martin F-22 Raptor. US military aircraft were spotted directly overhead of the town minutes before the balloon was shot down.

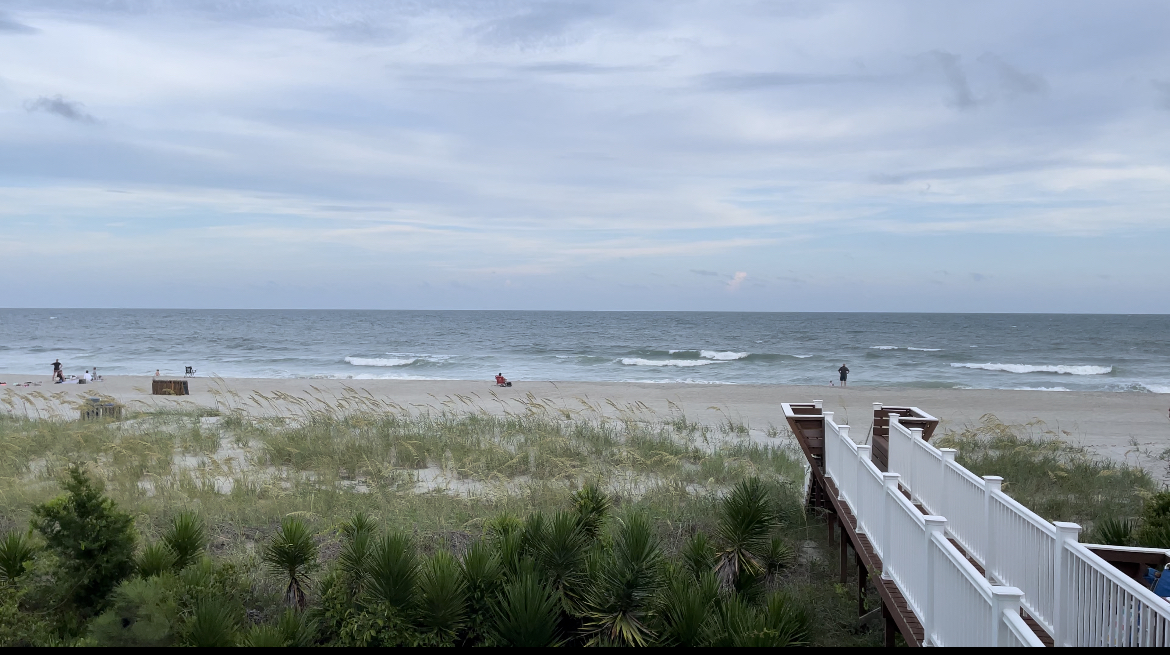
Surfside Beach in 2023

== Demographics ==
Historical population
Census	Pop.	Note	%±
1970	1,329		—
1980	2,522		89.8%
1990	3,845		52.5%
2000	4,425		15.1%
2010	3,837		−13.3%
2020	4,155		8.3%
U.S. Decennial Census

=== 2020 census ===
As of the 2020 census, Surfside Beach had a population of 4,155. The median age was 57.5 years. 10.3% of residents were under the age of 18 and 33.1% of residents were 65 years of age or older. For every 100 females there were 93.9 males, and for every 100 females age 18 and over there were 91.6 males age 18 and over.

100.0% of residents lived in urban areas, while 0.0% lived in rural areas.

There were 2,076 households and 1,230 families in Surfside Beach, of which 13.6% had children under the age of 18 living in them. Of all households, 46.6% were married-couple households, 18.6% were households with a male householder and no spouse or partner present, and 28.9% were households with a female householder and no spouse or partner present. About 33.1% of all households were made up of individuals and 15.8% had someone living alone who was 65 years of age or older.

There were 4,317 housing units, of which 51.9% were vacant. The homeowner vacancy rate was 3.3% and the rental vacancy rate was 30.8%.

Surfside Beach racial composition
Race	Num.	Perc.
White (non-Hispanic)	3,822	91.99%
Black or African American (non-Hispanic)	46	1.11%
Native American	15	0.36%
Asian	21	0.51%
Pacific Islander	9	0.22%
Other/Mixed	146	3.51%
Hispanic or Latino	96	2.31%

=== 2000 census ===
As of the census of 2000, there were 4,425 persons, 2,150 households, and 1,234 families residing in the town. The population density was 2,287.6 inhabitants per square mile (883.2/km^{2}). There were 3,698 housing units at an average density of 1,911.8 per square mile (738.2/km^{2}). The racial makeup of the town was 96.75% White, 0.95% African American, 0.50% Native American, 0.36% Asian, 0.02% Pacific Islander, 0.50% from other races, and 0.93% from two or more races. Hispanic or Latino of any race were 1.42% of the population.

There were 2,150 households, out of which 16.8% had children under the age of 18 living with them, 46.8% were married couples living together, 7.9% had a female householder with no husband present, and 42.6% were non-families. 31.8% of all households were made up of individuals, and 11.2% had someone living alone who was 65 years of age or older. The average household size was 2.06 and the average family size was 2.55.

In the town, the population was spread out, with 13.6% under the age of 18, 8.4% from 18 to 24, 28.8% from 25 to 44, 29.7% from 45 to 64, and 19.5% who were 65 years of age or older. The median age was 44 years. For every 100 females, there were 98.1 males. For every 100 females age 18 and over, there were 96.5 males.

The median income for a household in the town was $40,612, and the median income for a family was $49,847. Males had a median income of $31,864 versus $24,966 for females. The per capita income for the town was $24,445. About 4.7% of families and 7.5% of the population were below the poverty line, including 9.2% of those under age 18 and 7.6% of those age 65 or over.

=== Housing and seasonal residency ===
In Surfside Beach, there are thousands of homes and condos owned by non-residents who own vacation property for the sole purpose of attracting weekly vacation rentals.

== Government ==
The city is governed by an elected Council government system. The Council appoints a professional Administrator to manage all day to day activities and operations. The Mayor has no administrative duties and no powers beyond presiding over the meetings and acts as a figurehead of the Town within Councils direction. Council is elected to approve policy and to pass the annual budget.

== Transportation ==
=== Major roads and highways ===
- U.S. 17 Bus.
- U.S. 17
- SC 544
- Glenns Bay Road
- Ocean Boulevard
- Surfside Drive

== Education ==
Horry County Schools is the sole school district in the county. Surfside Beach is zoned to Seaside Elementary School, St. James Intermediate School, St. James Middle School, and St. James High School.

Surfside Beach has a public library, a branch of the Horry County Memorial Library system.

== Notable people ==
- Russell Fry, U.S. representative and former South Carolina state representative
