= Academy for Technology and Academics =

Location
- 5639 Highway 701 North; Conway, South Carolina 29526; United States
- Coordinates: 33°56′56″N 79°1′42″W

Information
- Type: Secondary
- Principal: Andrea Pridgen
- Website: ata.horrycountyschools.net

The Academy for Technology and Academics or ATA (formerly known as The Career Center) is a branch school of the Horry County Schools in Horry County, South Carolina, United States. The school's curriculum includes automotive technology, building construction, business management and administration, computer science, cosmetology, culinary arts, education, and health science technology. The school also has a Connect program for high school freshmen and sophomores.
