= Thad Viers =

American politician

Member of the South Carolina House of Representatives from the 68th district
- In office January 3, 2003 – January 3, 2010
- Preceded by: G. Murrell Smith Jr.
- Succeeded by: Heather Ammons Crawford

Personal details
- Born: March 13, 1978 (age 48)
- Party: Republican
- Profession: Business Development Consultant

Thad T. Viers (born March 13, 1978) is a former Republican South Carolina State Representative for District 68. He lives in Myrtle Beach, South Carolina.

== Early life and education ==
Viers was born in 1978 to Brenda and Carson Viers. Thad Viers grew up in Socastee, South Carolina, off of Highway 814 in Ammons mobile home park. Thad is short for Thaddeus (of the Twelve apostles). Thad has a younger brother also named after one of the Twelve apostles named Bartholomew (Bart for short). In high school, he started a Teen Age Republican (TAR) club before becoming an office intern for the late U.S. Senator Strom Thurmond. In 1995, Thad graduated from Socastee High School and then matriculated to The Citadel (military college) to pursue a Marine Corps commission, where he was awarded a three-year academic scholarship. He was injured and discharged.

== Career ==
In 1999, he went to work at The Heritage Foundation, where he served with Jack Spencer, now a senior fellow. After the completion of the ABM Missile Treaty Project, he returned to South Carolina to become the District Field Representative for former U.S. Congressman Henry Brown. He was also a business development consultant. He graduated from University of South Carolina School of Law in 2007.

=== South Carolina legislature ===
In 2002, incumbent Republican State Representative Murrell Smith was redistricted into another district, leaving the 68th House District open. In the Republican primary run-off, Viers defeated Helen Smith 52%-48%. He won the general election with 70%. He won re-election in 2004 (70%), 2006 (91%), 2008 (65%), and 2010 (98%).

In 2012, he was a candidate for the U.S. House of Representatives' newly created 7th District, during which he was charged with harassment of an ex-girlfriend and withdrew from the race.

=== Tenure ===
He was only one of seven members of the House to vote against the state taking stimulus money from the American Reinvestment and Recovery Act. In 2011, he won the South Carolina Association of Taxpayers "Friend of the Taxpayer" award. He has been endorsed by the NRA Political Victory Fund and the South Carolina Citizens for Life. He has signed the Americans for Tax Reform "Taxpayer Protection Pledge."

=== Committee assignments ===
- Judiciary Committee

== Personal life ==
In 2006, Viers was charged for threatening to beat up a man who was dating his estranged wife. Explaining that he was "under the influence of love," he pleaded no contest to the charge and was found guilty and fined.

In 2010, he sued the City of Myrtle Beach in the State Supreme Court over a law requiring motorcyclists to wear helmets within the city limits, which he regarded as unconstitutional.

=== Sexual harassment ===
In January 2012, Viers was arrested on charges of harassing a 28-year-old woman described as an ex-girlfriend. He was released on a $5000 bond and subsequently withdrew his bid for the GOP nomination to the U.S. Congress from South Carolina's 7th congressional district, citing "personal reasons".

=== Money laundering ===
In August 2014, Viers was indicted by a federal grand jury on fourteen felony charges including money laundering and making false statements to an IRS criminal investigator. Viers pleaded guilty to money laundering in April 2015 in a plea deal that dismissed his other charges. On October 20, 2015, Viers was sentenced to 37 months in prison and ordered to pay $875,000.

Viers was disbarred by the South Carolina Supreme Court in July 2016. In January 2017, Viers was released to a halfway house, according to prison officials.
