= Viers, Virginia =

Unincorporated community in Virginia, United States

Coordinates: 37°10′19″N 82°14′11″W

Viers is an unincorporated community in Dickenson County, Virginia, United States.

== History ==
A post office was established at Viers in 1906, and remained in operation until it was discontinued in 1959. The community was named for Lewis Viers, an early settler.
