= Carolina Forest High School =

Location
- 700 Gardner Lacy Road; Carolina Forest, South Carolina 29579; United States; 33°46′44″N 78°58′13″W

Information
- School type: Public high school
- Established: 1997 (29 years ago)
- School district: Horry County Schools
- Oversight: Horry County School District
- Superintendent: Clifford "Cliff" Jones
- CEEB code: 411468
- Principal: Gaye Driggers
- Staff: 163.50 (FTE)
- Grades: 9–12
- Enrollment: 3,181 (2023–2024)
- Student to teacher ratio: 19.46
- Campus type: Suburban
- Colors: Black, burgundy, and silver
- Mascot: Panthers
- Feeder schools: Black Water Middle; Ocean Bay Middle; Ten Oaks Middle; Carolina Forest Elementary; River Oaks Elementary; Ocean Bay Elementary; Palmetto Bays Elementary; South Conway Elementary (part); Waccamaw Elementary; Horry County Educational Center
- Website: cfh.horrycountyschools.net

Carolina Forest High School is located in Horry County, South Carolina, United States, in the Carolina Forest attendance area. The school is one of nine high schools within Horry County Schools. The school serves parts of Myrtle Beach and eastern Conway. Approximately 3300 students attend Carolina Forest High School (grades 9–12) each year. It is led by Principal Gaye Driggers.

== Accreditation ==
The school is accredited by the South Carolina Department of Education and the Commission of Colleges of the Southern Associating Colleges and Schools.

== Notable alumni ==
- Paul Gruber, current professional wrestler who is signed to All Elite Wrestling, and is part of the Death Riders stable, along with Claudio Castagnoli, Pac and Jon Moxley.

== See also ==
- High school
- Public education
- Secondary education
- List of high schools in South Carolina
