= Myrtle Beach High School =

Public school in Myrtle Beach, South Carolina, United States

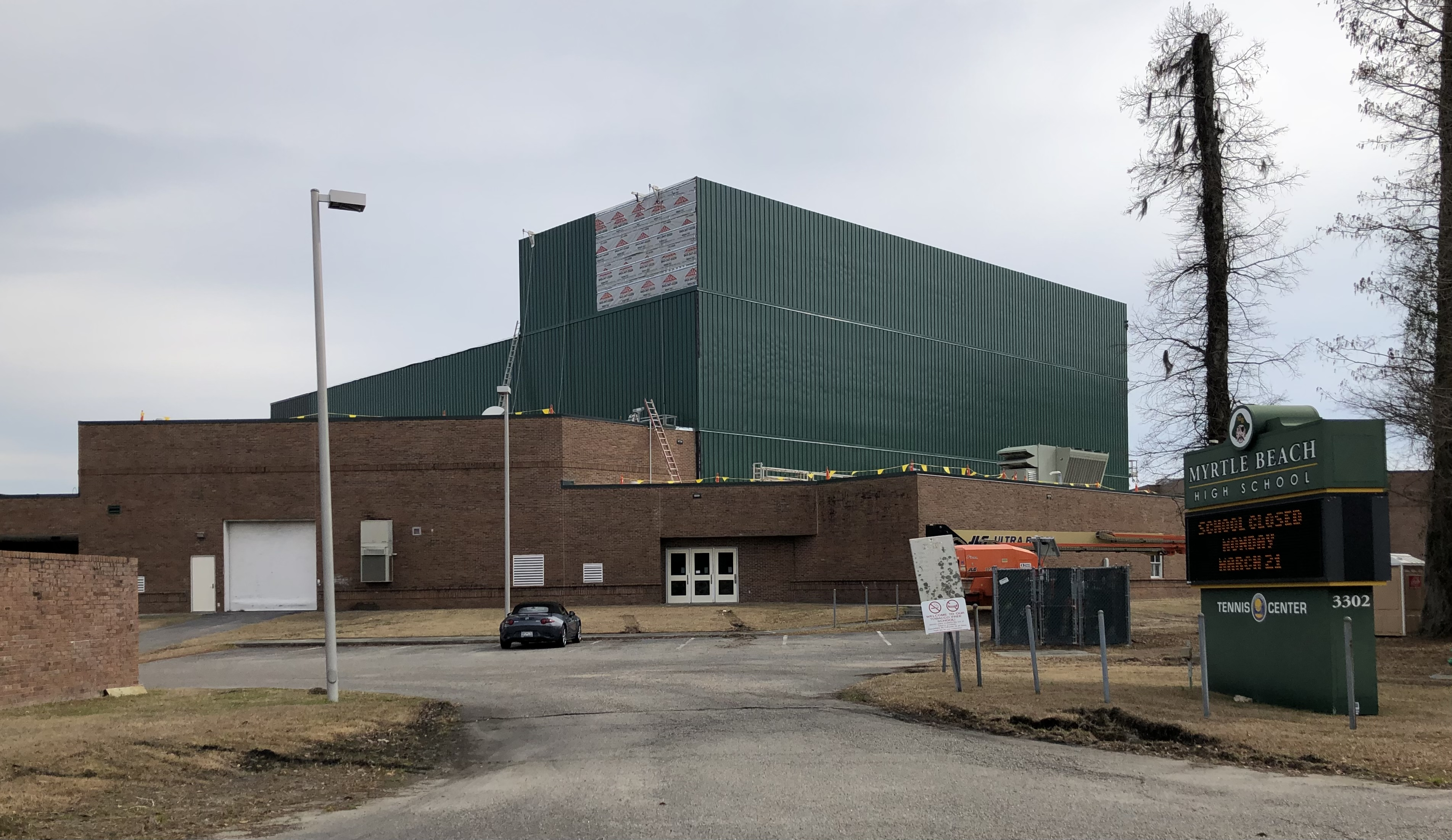

Location
- 3302 Robert Grissom Parkway; Myrtle Beach, (Horry County), South Carolina 29577; United States; 33°43′09″N 78°52′05″W

Information
- Type: Public high school
- School district: Horry County Schools
- Superintendent: Clifford "Cliff" Jones
- CEEB code: 411465
- Principal: Kristin Altman
- Teaching staff: 89.50 (on an FTE basis)
- Grades: 9–12
- Enrollment: 1,595 (2023–2024)
- Student to teacher ratio: 17.82
- Colors: Green and gold
- Team name: Seahawks
- Feeder schools: Myrtle Beach Middle School
- Website: www.horrycountyschools.net/Myrtle_Beach_High_School

Myrtle Beach High School (abbreviated MBHS) is a public school located in Myrtle Beach, South Carolina. The school is one of nine high schools within Horry County Schools. The school serves the city of Myrtle Beach. MBHS has over 1,500 students and is home to the Myrtle Beach High School Seahawks.

== History ==
Myrtle Beach High School originally shared a facility with all the lower grades in Myrtle Beach's public schools in a building occupying a city block bounded by N. Kings Highway, Oak Street, 5th Avenue North, and 6th Avenue North. In middle of the 1946–47 school year, a fire destroyed the school building; classes for the remainder of the school year were held in The Seaside Inn, which occupied the plot of land which the Myrtle Beach Pavilion amusement park was eventually built. Shortly after the fire, Myrtle Beach High School was rebuilt on a tract of land west of North Kings's Highway, northwest of the present intersection of U.S. 17 Business and 14th Avenue North in Myrtle Beach. In 1965, MBHS was one of the first public schools in its area to integrate both black and white students. 1990, the school building and athletic fields were sold by Horry County Schools and was redeveloped to the Kings Festival shopping center. MBHS was relocated to its present site on Robert Grissom Parkway between 29th and 38th Avenues North.

== Sports ==
Myrtle Beach High School offers the following sports: baseball, basketball, cheerleading, cross country, football, golf, soccer, softball, swimming, tennis, track and field, volleyball, lacrosse, and wrestling.

The school's teams compete in South Carolina Region VII in Class 4A sports.

The football team's home field is the Doug Shaw Memorial Stadium.

=== State championships ===
The Seahawks have won many state championships in school history, including:

Football: 1980, 1981, 1983, 1984, 2008, 2010, 2013 and 2018

Boys Basketball: 1965, 1987, 2002, and 2008.

Girls Basketball: 1948, 1964, 1986, 1997, 2001, 2010, and 2011.

Boys Golf: 1981, 1992, 2001 and 2002.

Boys Tennis: 1979, 1999, 2001, 2002, 2003, 2006, 2007, 2008, 2009, 2019, 2022, 2023, 2025, and 2026.

Girls Tennis: 1984, 1990, 1991, 1992, 1993, 1994, 1995, 1997, 1998, 2000, 2001, 2002, 2004, 2005, 2014 and 2015.

Volleyball: 2017

== NJROTC ==
Seahawks Cadet Corps have been in existence since 1994.

The unit competes in Academic, Drill, Rifle, Color Guard and Orienteering competitions throughout both North and South Carolina. In 2016, Myrtle Beach NJROTC was recognized by the Navy League as the Most Improved Unit in the entire United States.

== Notable alumni ==
- Sigmund Abeles – American figurative artist and art educator
- Robert Abraham – NFL linebacker
- Ryan Arambula – professional soccer player
- Lester Brown – Canadian Football League running back
- Ryan Butler – politician and filmmaker
- Brandon Frye – NFL offensive lineman
- Everett Golson – American football quarterback
- Anthony James – actor
- Kevin Kane – actor
- Steven Metz – author and national security expert
- Adam Randall – NFL running back, played collegiately at Clemson
- James M. Richardson – US Army general
- Ramon Sessions – professional basketball player
