= Myrtle Waves =

Water park in Myrtle Beach, South Carolina

Coordinates: 33°42′54″N 78°53′55″W

Myrtle Waves Water Park
- Interactive map of Myrtle Waves Water Park
- Location: Myrtle Beach, SC
- Status: Operating
- Opened: June 1, 1985
- Owner: Lazarus Entertainment Group
- Operated by: Innovative Attraction Management
- Operating season: Memorial Day - Labor Day
- Area: 20 acres (8.1 ha)

Attractions
- Water rides: 12
- Website: http://www.myrtlewaves.com

Myrtle Waves is a water park attraction in Myrtle Beach, South Carolina, the largest of the five water parks in the area and in the state. The park has been operating each season since opening on June 1, 1985. As of the 2019 season it featured 22 slides and attractions across 12 water rides. The park is owned by Lazarus Entertainment Group which also maintains the Broadway Grand Prix and Wild Water and Wheels family entertainment venues in Myrtle Beach.

In 2017, the park's ten story tall "Turbo Twisters" attraction was featured on the Travel Channel's Xtreme Waterparks show in.

Lazarus was sued in 2019 by a customer who alleged she contracted a flesh-eating organism at the Wild Water and Wheels park in 2017. Both Wild Water and Wheels and Myrtle Waves passed inspection by the South Carolina Department of Health and Environmental Control at the time. Wild Water and Wheels permanently closed its doors in 2022 due to financial issues, they demolished it in 2023.
