= The Sun News =

Newspaper in Myrtle Beach, South Carolina

- Type: Daily newspaper
- Format: Broadsheet
- Owner(s): The McClatchy Company
- President: Brian Tolley
- Founded: 1936 (as Myrtle Beach News)
- Headquarters: 914 Frontage Road East; Myrtle Beach, South Carolina 29577 United States
- Circulation: 17,284 Daily; 21,265 Sunday (as of 2020)
- Price: 20p
- Website: myrtlebeachonline.com

The Sun News is a daily newspaper published in Myrtle Beach, South Carolina, in the United States. It serves the Grand Strand region of South Carolina.

== History ==
The Myrtle Beach News was founded as a weekly in 1935 by brothers-in-law C. L. Phillips and J. Clarence Macklen. They had recently started a printing business, and local merchants asked them to do a local newspaper. In 1961, it was sold to Mark Garner, publisher of Myrtle Beach's other newspaper, the Myrtle Beach Sun (started in 1950). Garner merged the two papers into The Sun News, and soon began publishing twice weekly. With the explosive growth that occurred in the next half century, as the Grand Strand became a major tourist and retirement area, the paper stepped up its publication schedule, becoming a full-fledged daily by 1977. It was eventually acquired by The State Record Company in 1973.

Along with the rest of the State Record Company, it was acquired by the Knight Ridder newspaper chain in 1986. McClatchy became The Sun News’ parent company when it purchased Knight Ridder in June 2006. McClatchy filed for bankruptcy in 2020 and the company was purchased by Chatham Asset Management for $312 million.

In June 2024, The Sun News announced it would be printed twice weekly.

== See also ==
- List of newspapers in South Carolina
