= Socastee High School =

High school

Coordinates: 33.6840596°N 79.0003122°W

Location
- 4900 Socastee Boulevard; Myrtle Beach, South Carolina 29588; United States

Information
- School type: Public secondary
- School district: Horry County Schools
- Superintendent: Clifford Jones
- CEEB code: 411470
- Principal: Shauna Schubiger
- Staff: 97.00 (FTE)
- Grades: 9–12
- Gender: Coeducation
- Enrollment: 1,712 (2023–2024)
- Student to teacher ratio: 17.65
- Campus type: Suburban
- Colors: Black and gold
- Slogan: "Once a Brave always a Brave"
- Team name: SHS Braves
- Publication: Spindles Literary Magazine
- Newspaper: The Native Voice
- Yearbook: The Chief
- Feeder schools: Forestbrook Middle, Socastee Middle, Forestbrook Elementary, Lakewood Elementary, Socastee Elementary
- Website: sh.horrycountyschools.net

Socastee High School (abbreviated SHS) is a large, three-story public high school with about 1,700 students located in Socastee, South Carolina in the Myrtle Beach metro area. It is run by Horry County Schools.

== Academics ==
Socastee High School currently offers an IB program and several AP courses for advanced students. Socastee offers the IB Diploma Programme, and has been an IB World School since January 1997.

== Sports ==
Socastee High currently sponsors these interscholastic teams through its athletic department for both young men and women: wrestling, basketball, athletic training, varsity cheerleading, girls' lacrosse, boys' lacrosse, golf, football, girls' tennis, swimming, volleyball, baseball, softball, cross country and men's tennis.

== Awards and recognition ==
Socastee High School won the 1988 National High School Mock Trial Championship, held in Dallas, Texas.

In 2010, Socastee High School made an appearance in Newsweek magazine's list of America's Best High Schools.

== Notable alumni ==
- Kiera Cass, writer of young adult fiction, best known for The Selection Series
- Chris Lemonis, college baseball coach
- Wendi Nix, anchor and sports reporter for ESPN
- Hunter Renfrow, NFL wide receiver and two-time CFP National Champion with the Clemson Tigers
- Thad Viers, former Republican South Carolina Representative for District 68
- Heather Ammons Crawford, South Carolina State Representative for District 68

== See also ==
- List of high schools in South Carolina
