= The Market Common =

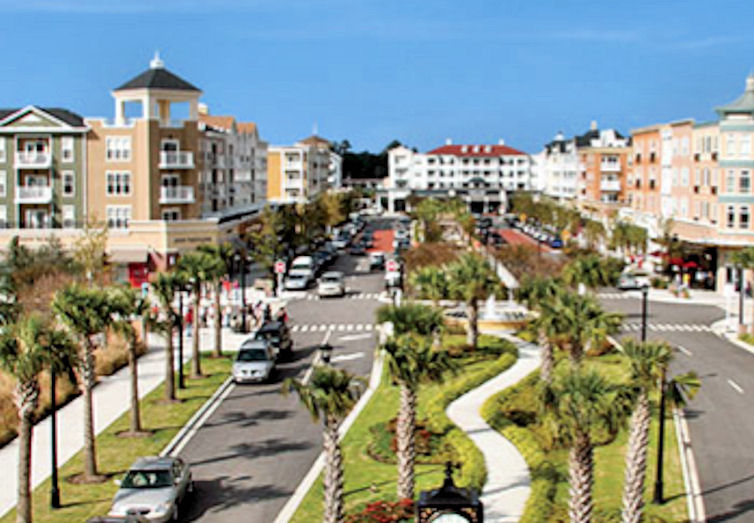
- Market Common District
- Location: Myrtle Beach, South Carolina, U.S.
- Coordinates: 33.6700°N 78.9398°W
- Opened: April 2008
- Developer: McCaffery Interests
- Owner: BEI-Beach LLC
- Architect: Antunovich Associates
- Num. of stores: 48
- Website: www.marketcommonmb.com

The Market Common (sometimes known as Market Common or Market Common District) is a 114-acre (0.46 km^{2}) lifestyle center located in Myrtle Beach, South Carolina.

== History ==
In 1998, The Myrtle Beach Air Force Base Redevelopment Authority, the city of Myrtle Beach and Design Works L.C. developed the Urban Village Redevelopment Master Plan to use existing structures and plan new development not related to tourism in the Myrtle Beach International Airport complex that became civilian after the closure of the Air Force Base that was shared with the airport.

The Market Common opened in 2008. It competes mainly with nearby shopping complexes Coastal Grand Mall and Broadway at the Beach. The complex has townhomes, small stores and restaurants. Many of the streets in the district are named after former Myrtle Beach Air Force Base Wing and Base Commanders, or other notable Air Force members who were assigned to the base. Also scattered throughout Market Common are small memorial information signs noting historical facts about the base.

As of 2017, much of the residential development is single family, with apartments. More apartments are being planned.

In 2019, The Market Common won a National Site Reuse Award in the Base Realignment and Closure category. An Environmental Protection Agency news release said the development had a $3 billion economic impact and paid nearly $120 million in taxes. According to Buddy Styers, executive director of the Myrtle Beach Air Force Base Redevelopment Authority, the number of jobs created "probably exceeds 6,000".

=== Foreclosure and Sale ===
On May 11, 2010, JPMorgan Chase claimed in a foreclosure suit that LUK-MB1 LLC owed $105 million and was no longer making payments on the construction loan for The Market Common. Jones Lang LaSalle, as receiver, managed the complex. 37 of 55 businesses were on a "watch list", meaning they had asked for or could get reductions in rent, or that they had to meet certain conditions to stay in the center.

An attorney representing the receiver said in a written statement that The Market Common was sold to BEI-Beach LLC, incorporated in Delaware on Dec. 27.

=== HomeFed Corp.’s acquisition of BEI-Beach LLC ===
On April 23, 2013, it was reported by The Sun News that a California-based real estate investor and developer HomeFed Corp has acquired BEI-Beach LLC, who owns The Market Common and the undeveloped land around it, as well as other subsidiaries of Leucadia National Corp. Myrtle Beach city official say that the deal could lead to development moving forward quicker on some of BEI-Beach LLC's vacant property. Nothing will change at The Market Common as BEI-Beach will remain owner of the 6 year old shopping and entertainment center that is located on the former Myrtle Beach Air Force Base. "Management will stay the same, and no changes to the stores or other operations are planned as a result of the deal," said Brooke Doswell, The Market Common’s general manager.

== Parks ==
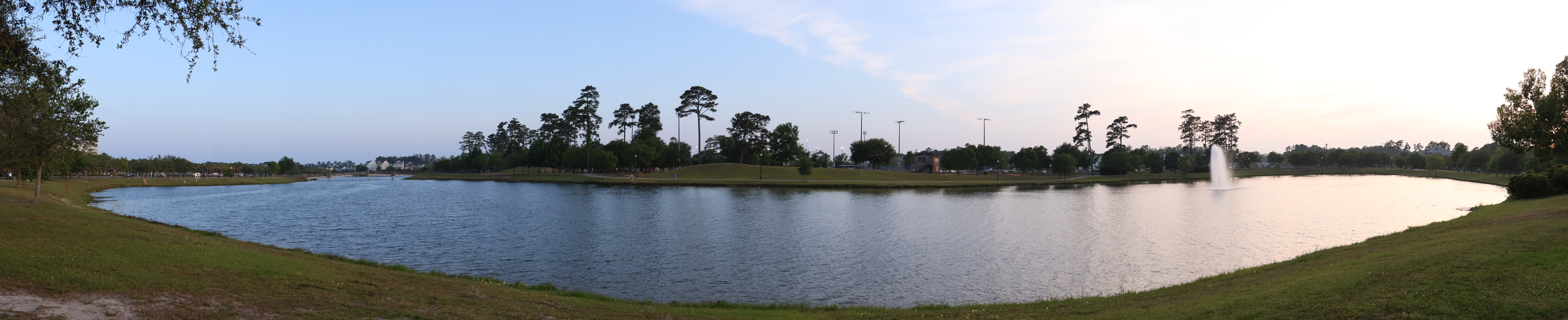
Panorama of the main pond around the athletic complex

- Colonel Thomas 'Buddy' Styers Athletic Complex @Grand Park
- Valor Memorial Park
- Warbird Park
- Barc Park-South

=== Savannah's Playground ===
Savannah's Playground, located at the adjacent Grand Park Recreation Complex, is Myrtle Beach's first year-round playground accessible to disabled children. Groundbreaking on the $3 million four-acre project took place in August 2015 with a targeted first phase completion of January 2016. It is named for Savannah Thompson, who has Williams syndrome and supravalvular aortic stenosis but has become the ambassador for Grand Strand Miracle Leagues. A nonprofit organization headed by the city mayor was not able to raise all of the stated $1.5 million in private funds required to complete the first phase and construction languished during the winter and early spring of 2016 until the City Council redirected $350,000 in real estate TIF funds towards the park to complete the first phase. The city runs and maintains the park.
