= St. James High School (South Carolina) =

- St. James High School Logo

Location
- 10800 Highway 707; Burgess, South Carolina 29576; United States; 33°36′54″N 79°03′09″W

Information
- School type: Public secondary
- Motto: Sharks Move Only in One Direction, FORWARD
- Established: 2002 (24 years ago)
- School district: Horry County Schools
- Superintendent: Rick Maxey
- CEEB code: 411472
- Principal: Ryan Poston
- Faculty: 106.50 (FTE)
- Grades: 9–12
- Enrollment: 1,880 (2023–2024)
- Student to teacher ratio: 17.65
- Campus type: Suburban
- Colors: Blue and white
- Mascot: Sharks
- Newspaper: Shark Attack
- Yearbook: Echoes
- Feeder schools: St. James Middle School; St. James Intermediate School; St. James Elementary School; Burgess Elementary School; Seaside Elementary School
- Website: sjh.horrycountyschools.net

St. James High School (SJHS) is a public high school in Burgess, South Carolina, United States, located west of Highway 17 on Highway 707 approximately six miles from the Atlantic Ocean. It is one of 13 high schools in the Horry County School District. St. James has over 1,700 students and is the home of the St. James High School Sharks. St. James Elementary, Burgess Elementary, Seaside Elementary, St. James Intermediate, and St. James Middle School feed into St. James High.

== History ==
Due to the rapid growth in the south beach area and overcrowding at Socastee High School, Horry County Schools began planning the construction of a new high school in the Burgess community in 2002. Although the county wanted to name the new school South Strand High School, the decision was ultimately left up to a committee formed by local students and parents to select the school's name, mascot, and colors. The name St. James High School was chosen, and the school opened to students in 2003. St. James opened with 700 students, which did not include a senior class. In 2016, St. James won the prestigious Palmetto Finest School Award.

On March 4th, 2026, a student attending St. James High School was stabbed in a restroom inside of the school by another student at approximately 2 PM, leading to the school going under lockdown protocol until 3:15, upon which the school conducted a controlled release of the remainder of the students attending the school. The student stabbed was taken to a local hospital in the area.

== Campus ==
The high school has eight computer labs, a media center with over 14,000 books, a 682-seat auditorium, gymnasium, mini gym, and a weight room. Its athletic facilities include three lighted practice fields, a 5,000 seat football/soccer stadium surrounded by an eight-lane track, a softball field, baseball field, four tennis courts, and an on-campus cross country course. Additionally, the boys' golf team plays at Wicked Stick Golf Links in Myrtle Beach, South Carolina, the girls' golf team plays at Blackmoor Golf Club in Murrells Inlet, South Carolina, and the swim team meets at Coastal Carolina University.

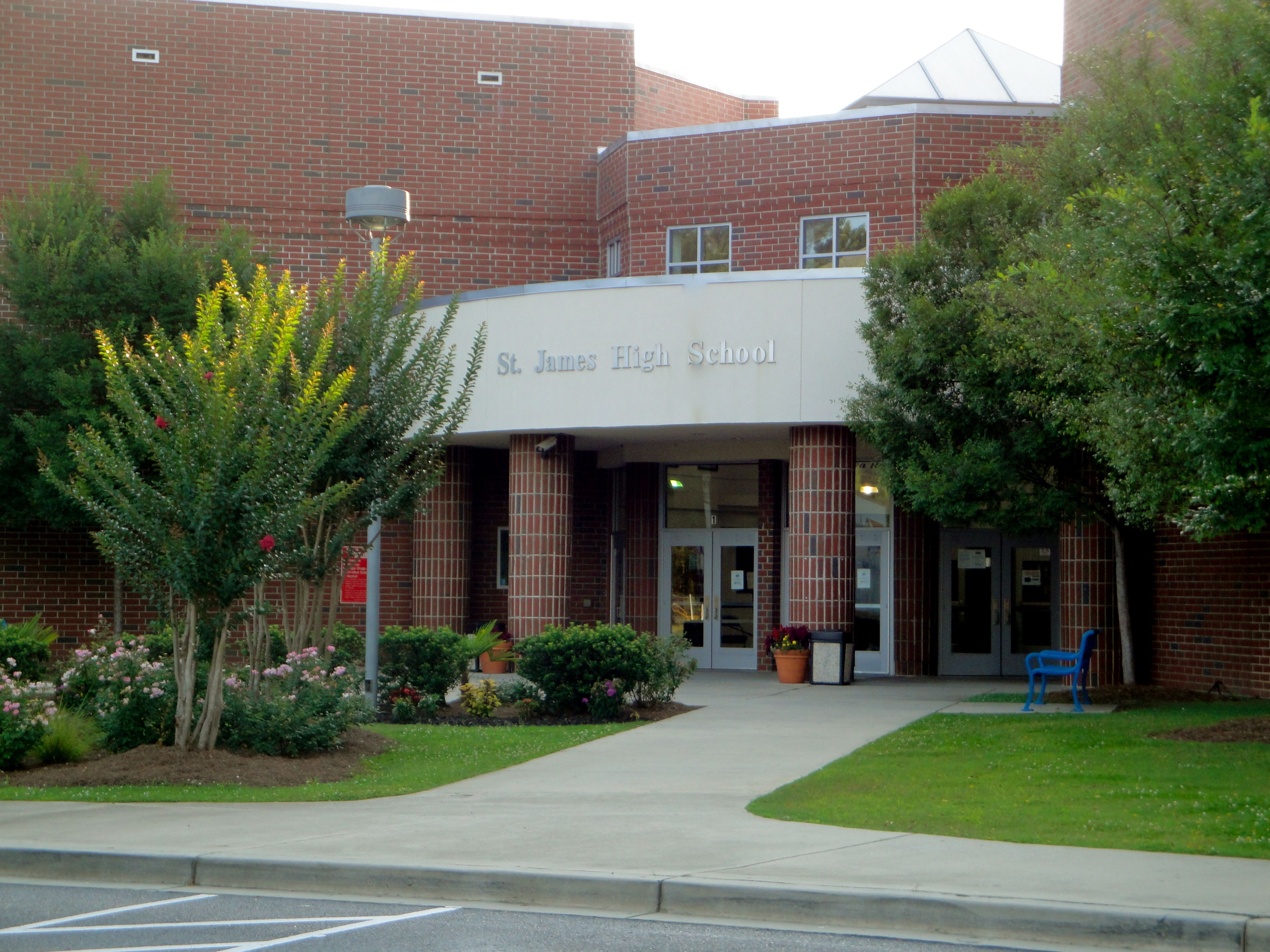
St. James High School main entrance

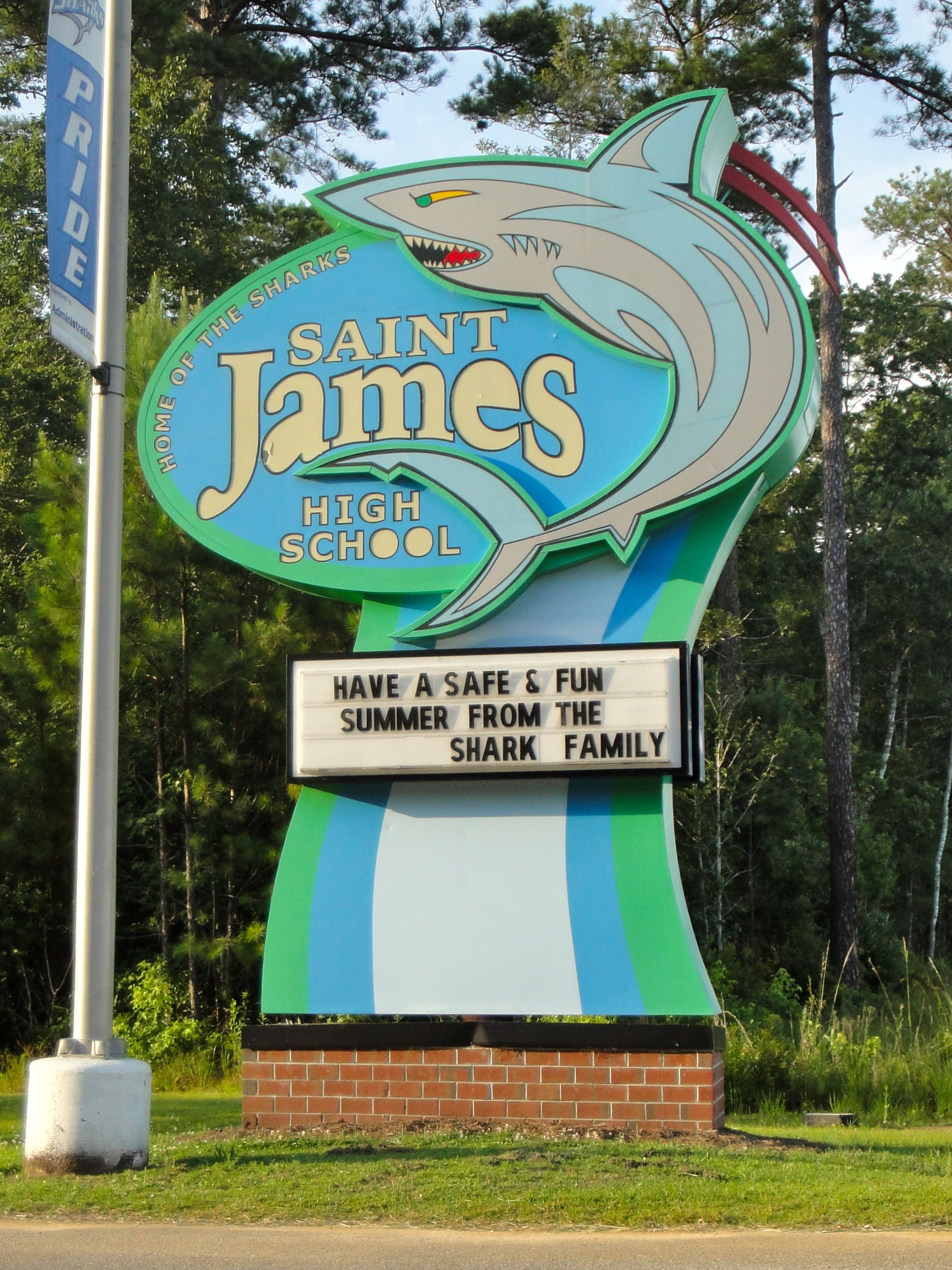
St. James High School entrance sign

== Academics ==
St. James offers 19 Advanced Placement classes along with Horry-Georgetown Technical College.

The English Department produces the Shark Attack school newspaper and the Echoes yearbook.

A JROTC program was also implemented in 2010, with about 200 cadets annually.

== Athletics ==
St. James offers 11 fall sports, seven winter sports, 13 spring sports, and five annual sports.

- Fall sports: B-team, JV, and varsity football, JV and varsity volleyball, boys' and girls' cross country, girls' golf, girls' tennis, and girls' and boys' swimming.
- Winter sports: wrestling, B-team, JV, and varsity boys' basketball, and B-team, JV, and varsity girls' basketball.
- Spring sports: JV and varsity baseball, JV and varsity softball, boys' tennis, boys' and girls' track and field, boys' JV and varsity golf, JV and varsity boys' soccer, JV and varsity girls' soccer, JV and Varsity boys' lacrosse, JV and Varsity girls' lacrosse.
- Year-round sports: B-team, JV and varsity cheerleading, Sharkies dance team, and step team.

State championships

- 2006–2007: Girls Softball AAA State Champions
- 2008–2009: Boys 4x400 Meter Relay AAA State Champions
- 2010–2011: Boys Baseball AAA State Champion

== Fine Arts ==
St. James High School offers inclusive, award-winning Fine Arts Programs that consistently earn top placements at competitions, produce professional level musical theater productions, and focus on students' growth and achievement.

- Instrumental Music: Ensembles include the SJHS Wind Ensemble, SJHS Concert Band, SJHS Jazz Band, and the Pride of St. James Marching Band which has won Grand Champion at numerous competitions, qualifying for the SCBDA Marching Band State Finals two years in a row.
- Vocal Music: Choral Ensembles include Shark Singers (Beginners), Chorale (Advanced), Concert Choir (All students).The Choral Department consistently earns Superior ratings at SCMEA events, places many students in County/Region/State/National honor choirs, and participates in regional competitions and events such as Music in the Parks, Festival Disney, and the WDW Candlelight Processional.
- Musical Theater St. James Theatre has a comprehensive selection of Theatre classes including Drama 1-5, Honors Theatre 3-4, Technical Theatre, and MusicalTheatre 1& 2. The successful program produces 1-2 competition plays, 2 musicals, a holiday cabaret and a Broadway revue each year.

Alumni of St James Theatre have successfully continued with a BA/ BFA degrees in Theatre and Musical Theatre and can be seen in performance venues across the United States.
