= Springmaid Beach, South Carolina =

- Neighborhood and resort community
- Location within South Carolina Location within the United States
- Coordinates: 33°39′23″N 78°55′13″W
- Country: United States
- State: South Carolina
- County: Horry
- City: Myrtle Beach
- Settled: 1948
- Time zone: Eastern
  - Summer (DST): Eastern
- ZIP Code: 29577
- Area code: 843

Springmaid Beach is a neighborhood and resort community in Horry County, South Carolina, United States, straddling the city limits of Myrtle Beach. It lies north of Myrtle Beach State Park on Ocean Boulevard near Farrow Parkway.

== DoubleTree Resort (formerly Springmaid Resort & Conference Center) ==
Colonel Elliott White Springs, a World War I Ace Fighter Pilot, purchased 27 acres (11 ha) of oceanfront property in Myrtle Beach, South Carolina in 1948. The original accommodations resembled military barracks, the rooms containing built-in concrete beds with twin-size foam mattresses. The rooms were easily cleaned by hosing and brushing them down. Guests brought their own towels and sheets and were required to make their own bed. Rooms cost $2.00 per night or $1.00 per bed. The rates remained unchanged for almost 30 years. The resort was originally owned by the textile company Springs Industries, and available for Springs employees only. The resort opened to the public in 1953, but retained the Springmaid name until 2016. A large cafeteria was also built on property and the food was prepared at the commissary in Lancaster, SC and was trucked to the beach daily. Eventually a full kitchen was added and food was prepared on site and food was served in the original cafeteria. Springmaid added their first semi-private rooms in 1956 consisting of two rooms adjoined by a common bath. The first private rooms were built in 1966. The administration office and four two-story buildings of private guestrooms were built between 1970 and 1973. These buildings were the first on property to have air conditioning.

Beginning in 1989, some of the older rooms were torn down and construction began on two additional three-story buildings. The rooms in this building contained televisions (which were eventually added to all the rooms). Telephones were not added to any of the rooms until 1990. In 1992, a 60-unit tower which is now the Palmetto Building was opened along with the first floor of the Robert L. Reid Conference Center. In 1995, the Live Oak building, which consisted of 232 units, and the second floor of the Robert L. Reid Conference Center was opened. In 2001, the third floor of the Robert L. Reid Conference Center and another 154 rooms in the Palmetto building were opened. The Cypress building was renovated in 2001 and that completed the 485 unit resort. An affiliate of Integrated Capital of Los Angeles bought the resort in December 2014 for $40 million. The Live Oak and Palmetto towers, with 452 guest rooms, will be renovated. The Cypress building and Marlin's cafeteria have been torn down and will be replaced by a new registration area, bar and restaurant, along with a courtyard.

The Springmaid Beach Resort was purchased by Hilton Hotels in 2016. Hilton remodeled the resort and renamed it to DoubleTree Resort.

== Fishing pier ==
The original fishing pier was built in 1953, but was destroyed the next year by Hurricane Hazel. The pier was rebuilt in 1959 and destroyed again by an airplane.

In 1973 a new pier was built on the north end of the resort and remained standing until it was destroyed on October 8, 2016 as Hurricane Matthew passed through the area shortly after making landfall a short distance south. The pier was the longest in Myrtle Beach, at 1060 feet long. Rebuilding of the pier began in May 2019 and the pier reopened in July 2020.
