= Academy for the Arts, Science and Technology =

Academy for the Arts, Science & Technology

Location
- 895 International Dr; Myrtle Beach, South Carolina 29579; United States

Information
- School type: Public, Secondary
- Motto: Realize the Possiblities
- School district: Horry County Schools
- Superintendent: Clifford "Cliff" Jones
- Principal: Kelly Wilson
- Grades: 11–12
- Campus type: Suburban
- Mascot: Koi fish (unofficial)
- Website: aast.horrycountyschools.net

The Academy for the Arts, Science and Technology (shortened as AAST or The Academy) is a branch school of the Horry County Schools system in Horry County, South Carolina. It has a focus on specific career majors and has qualifying status as a Blue Ribbon School and as a New American High School. Despite this, by a vote of the Horry County School Board on October 21, 2019, the program was partially dismantled and converted into a two-year program from a four-year program. In 2025, AAST was admitted to SCASA's Palmetto's Finest list.
