= Horry County Schools =

Public school district in South Carolina, U.S.

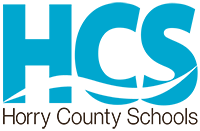

Location
- 335 Four Mile Road; Conway, South Carolina 29526 South East United States

District information
- Type: Public
- Grades: PreK-12
- Superintendent: Clifford Jones
- Schools: 56
- NCES District ID: 4502490

Students and staff
- Students: 45,000 (2018-19 school year)
- Teachers: 2,601
- Staff: 5,540
- Colors: HCS blue and black

Other information
- Website: www.horrycountyschools.net

Horry County Schools (HCS) is a public school district serving Horry County, South Carolina, and is the third-largest school district in South Carolina. It serves over 45,000 students (as of the 2018–19 school year) in 56 schools (as well as offering additional education programs). The district office is located in Conway.

The district boundary parallels that of the county. The district is made up of nine attendance areas: Aynor, Carolina Forest, Conway, Green Sea Floyds, Loris, Myrtle Beach, North Myrtle Beach, Socastee, and St. James.

Each area consists of a high school and the elementary and middle schools that feed into it. The district has 27 schools serving pre-kindergarten through fifth grades, 13 middle schools, 9 high schools, 3 career and technical academies, a Scholars Academy, and four charter schools. Two of the high schools, Aynor High School and Socastee High School, offer International Baccalaureate programs. The career and technical academies are: Academy for Arts, Sciences and Technology; Palmetto Academy for Learning Motor Sports, and the Academy for Technology and Academics. The Palmetto Academy for Learning Motor Sports (a charter school) serves middle and high school students while the remaining two serve high school students. The Scholars Academy serves high-achieving students in grades 9-12. The HCS Early College High School targets students in grades 9-12 who are under-represented in post-secondary education, and allows them to obtain two years of college credit while also earning a high school diploma. The district also has the Playcard Environmental Education Center which "instruct[s] students in the natural sciences on site, enabling them to experience first-hand the inter-relationships of living things." The Adult Education Center has a variety of educational opportunities for adults. These range from GED classes to career and college transition, community classes, English as Second Language classes, and community classes. The community classes are: computer literacy classes, arts & crafts classes, Spanish, CPR/AED certification, and Tai Chi for arthritis/health. The Adult Education Center also provides free child care and early education for children of parents attending classes at the Adult Education Center. In addition to these programs, students from seventh grade up may also take classes via either the HCS Virtual School Program or the South Carolina Virtual School Program.

A twelve-member board of education, elected from single-member districts, governs the school district, with the chairman being elected at-large. The superintendent is appointed by the board. Board meetings are generally held on the last Monday of the month and work sessions held on the 2nd Monday of the month though the district calendar contains an accurate listing of all board meetings. Normal board meetings are open to the public and agendas, minutes, and video of the meetings are available through the school district's website.

The HCS Mobile app was introduced in 2018. The app is available for iOS and Android operating systems and as a web/html5 based app.

== Controversies ==
Starting in 2022, the school board voted to significantly expand its list of banned and restricted books by adding nine books. The expansion continued the following year when twelve more books were added, including Ta-Nehisi Coates' Between the World and Me, which gained media attention when it was banned in another South Carolina school district in 2023.

== Schools ==
=== Elementary schools ===
- Aynor Elementary School
- Burgess Elementary School
- Carolina Forest Elementary School
- Conway Elementary School
- Daisy Elementary School
- Forestbrook Elementary School
- Green Sea Floyds Elementary School
- Homewood Elementary School
- Kingston Elementary School
- Lakewood Elementary School
- Loris Elementary School
- Midland Elementary School
- Myrtle Beach Elementary School
- Myrtle Beach Early Childhood School
- Myrtle Beach Primary School
- Ocean Bay Elementary School
- Ocean Drive Elementary School
- Palmetto Bays Elementary School
- Pee Dee Elementary School
- Pine Island Elementary School
- River Oaks Elementary School
- Riverside Elementary School
- Seaside Elementary School
- Socastee Elementary School
- South Conway Elementary School
- St. James Elementary School
- St. James Intermediate School
- Ten Oaks Elementary School
- Waccamaw Elementary School
- Waterway Elementary School

=== Middle schools ===
- Aynor Middle School
- Black Water Middle School
- Conway Middle School
- Forestbrook Middle School
- Green Sea Floyds Middle School
- Loris Middle School
- Myrtle Beach Middle School
- North Myrtle Beach Middle School
- Ocean Bay Middle School
- Socastee Middle School
- St. James Middle School
- Ten Oaks Middle School
- Whittemore Park Middle School

=== Base high schools and high school options ===
- Academy for Technology & Academics
- Academy for Arts, Science & Technology
- Aynor High School
- Carolina Forest High School
- Conway High School
- HCS Early College High School
- Green Sea Floyds High School
- Loris High School
- Myrtle Beach High School
- North Myrtle Beach High School
- Scholars Academy
- Socastee High School
- St. James High School

=== Program Schools ===
- HCS Virtual School
- Horry County Adult Education
- Playcard Environmental Education Center
- Therapeutic Learning Center
- SOAR Academy

=== Charter schools ===
- Bridgewater Academy
- Palmetto Academy
- Academy of Hope
- Palmetto Academy for Learning Motor Sports
- Coastal High School
