= Socastee, South Carolina =

- CDP
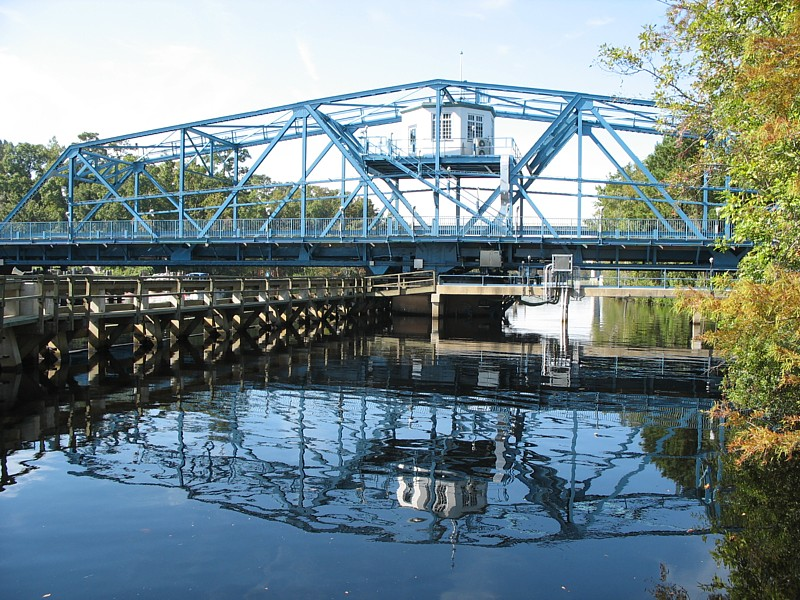
- Socastee Swing Bridge

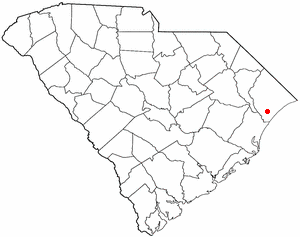
- Location of Socastee in South Carolina
- Coordinates: 33°40′58″N 78°59′36″W
- Country: United States
- State: South Carolina
- County: Horry

Area
  - Total: 13.88 sq mi (35.96 km^{2})
  - Land: 13.37 sq mi (34.62 km^{2})
  - Water: 0.52 sq mi (1.34 km^{2})
- Elevation: 20 ft (6.1 m)

Population (2020)
  - Total: 22,213
  - Density: 1,661.8/sq mi (641.64/km^{2})
- Time zone: UTC−5 (EST)
  - Summer (DST): UTC−4 (EDT)
- ZIP Code: 29588
- Area code: 843
- FIPS code: 45-67390
- GNIS feature ID: 2402863

Socastee is a census-designated place (CDP) in Horry County, South Carolina, United States. The population was 19,952 at the 2010 census.

== History ==
Socastee is an Indigenous American name referred to as "Sawkastee" in a 1711 land grant to Percival Pawley. A skirmish between small forces of American and British troops occurred near Socastee Creek in 1781. By the 1870s, the Socastee community was a significant center for the production and distribution of naval stores such as turpentine and tar. This area included a saw mill, turpentine distilleries, cotton gin, grist mill, cooper shop and general store. The Socastee Historic District was listed in the National Register of Historic Places in 2002.

== Geography ==
According to the United States Census Bureau, the CDP has a total area of 13.9 square miles (36.0 km^{2}), of which 13.4 square miles (34.6 km^{2}) is land and 0.5 square mile (1.4 km^{2}) (3.81%) is water.

== Demographics ==
Historical population
Census	Pop.	Note	%±
2000	14,295		—
2010	19,952		39.6%
2020	22,213		11.3%
U.S. Decennial Census

=== 2020 census ===
As of the 2020 census, Socastee had a population of 22,213. The median age was 41.0 years. 20.7% of residents were under the age of 18 and 19.7% of residents were 65 years of age or older. For every 100 females there were 95.0 males, and for every 100 females age 18 and over there were 92.8 males age 18 and over.

98.0% of residents lived in urban areas, while 2.0% lived in rural areas.

There were 9,068 households and 5,903 families in Socastee, of which 27.3% had children under the age of 18 living in them. Of all households, 44.1% were married-couple households, 18.0% were households with a male householder and no spouse or partner present, and 28.4% were households with a female householder and no spouse or partner present. About 26.7% of all households were made up of individuals and 10.9% had someone living alone who was 65 years of age or older.

There were 10,070 housing units, of which 10.0% were vacant. The homeowner vacancy rate was 2.2% and the rental vacancy rate was 9.0%.

Racial composition as of the 2020 census
Race	Number	Percent
White	16,279	73.3%
Black or African American	1,657	7.5%
American Indian and Alaska Native	166	0.7%
Asian	459	2.1%
Native Hawaiian and Other Pacific Islander	37	0.2%
Some other race	1,632	7.3%
Two or more races	1,983	8.9%
Hispanic or Latino (of any race)	3,059	13.8%

=== 2000 census ===
As of the census of 2000, there were 14,295 people, 5,593 households, and 3,820 families living in the CDP. The population density was 1,069.1 inhabitants per square mile (412.8/km^{2}). There were 6,356 housing units at an average density of 475.4 per square mile (183.6/km^{2}). The racial makeup of the CDP was 86.81% White, 7.01% African American, 0.35% Native American, 2.10% Asian, 0.13% Pacific Islander, 2.01% from other races, and 1.59% from two or more races. Hispanic or Latino of any race were 4.66% of the population.

There were 5,593 households, out of which 33.1% had children under the age of 18 living with them, 52.4% were married couples living together, 11.3% had a female householder with no husband present, and 31.7% were non-families. 22.7% of all households were made up of individuals, and 4.6% had someone living alone who was 65 years of age or older. The average household size was 2.54 and the average family size was 2.97.

In the CDP, the population was spread out, with 24.3% under the age of 18, 9.7% from 18 to 24, 34.9% from 25 to 44, 22.7% from 45 to 64, and 8.4% who were 65 years of age or older. The median age was 34 years. For every 100 females, there were 102.0 males. For every 100 females age 18 and over, there were 101.4 males.

The median income for a household in the CDP was $40,436, and the median income for a family was $45,994. Males had a median income of $28,845 versus $21,782 for females. The per capita income for the CDP was $18,069. About 5.6% of families and 9.3% of the population were below the poverty line, including 13.7% of those under age 18 and 7.8% of those age 65 or over.

== Education ==
Horry County School District is the sole school district in the county.

Socastee has a public library, a branch of the Horry County Memorial Library.

== See also ==
- Socastee Historic District
