= Dream School =

American reality television series

- Genre: Reality
- Country of origin: United States
- Original language: English
- No. of seasons: 2
- No. of episodes: 10

Production
- Executive producers: Andrew Jameson; Curtis "50 Cent" Jackson; Jamie Oliver; Jonathan Grosskopf; Roy Ackerman
- Production companies: Fresh One Productions; G-Unit Films and Television

Original release
- Network: SundanceTV
- Release: October 7, 2013 – November 5, 2014

Dream School is an American reality television series on SundanceTV that premiered on October 7, 2013.

The series follows 15 high school dropouts as they are taught by a series of celebrity "teachers", including lawyer and rights activist Gloria Allred, actor David Arquette, author Rabbi Shmuley Boteach, conservationist Jeff Corwin, civil rights activist Jesse Jackson, astronaut Mae Jemison, television journalist Soledad O'Brien, financial advisor Suze Orman, filmmaker Oliver Stone, and musician Swizz Beatz.

The series is an adaptation of British television show Jamie's Dream School, created by celebrity chef Jamie Oliver. It is produced by Oliver and rapper Curtis "50 Cent" Jackson.

== Episodes ==
=== Season 1 (2013) ===
No.	Title	Original release date
1	"50 Cent, Oliver Stone, David Arquette & Cliff Dorfman"	October 7, 2013
David Arquette takes the role of homeroom teacher and welcomes the students to "Dream School". Cliff Dorfman takes the role of English Teacher, and, despite his efforts, some rebel against him.
2	"Jeff Corwin, Soledad O'Brien, David Arquette & Doriana Sanchez"	October 14, 2013
Doriana Sanchez tests the students with handling themselves in public with an exercise; however, her non-confrontational stance might give some student too much leeway. Jeff Corwin serves the school as Biology teacher by taking nature to them. With an exam coming up, Corwin makes a proposal, the top students will come with him and learn firsthand behind the scenes of his profession.
3	"Music With Swizz Beatz"	October 21, 2013
Despite succeeding, the teachers notice that all the students are struggling with English basics. Swizz Beatz takes the role of music teacher to inspire the students.
4	"History With Oliver Stone"	October 28, 2013
Director Oliver Stone plays History Teacher again despite the last session. He teaches them History through life experience.
5	"Suze Orman's Smackdown"	November 4, 2013
Suze Orman takes the role of Economics Teacher and ingrains the concept of "real life" into all of the students, except for one who decides to walk out on the program.
6	"The Final Test"	November 11, 2013

=== Season 2 (2014) ===
On May 19, 2014, SundanceTV renewed the series for a second season, which premiered Wednesday, October 1 at 10/9c.

== Faculty ==
- Principal – Dr. Steven Keller
- Advisors – Scott Whitney, Tizoc Brenes, and Emily Bautista

== Celebrity teachers ==
=== First season ===
==== Art ====
- Swizz Beatz (Music)
- Chris Jordan (Photography)
- Roy Choi (Cooking)

==== English ====
- Cliff Dorfman (Writing/Literature)
- Soledad O’Brien (Journalism)

==== Homeroom ====
- Curtis “50 Cent” Jackson
- David Arquette

==== Science ====
- Dr. Mae Jemison (Earth Science)
- Cara Santa Maria (Physical Science)
- Jeff Corwin (Biology)
- Fabien Cousteau (Physics)

==== Social Studies ====
- Oliver Stone (World History)
- Suze Orman (Economics)
- Rev. Jesse Jackson (Political Science)

=== Second season ===
- lawyer and rights activist Gloria Allred
- Rabbi Shmuley Boteach (author of Kosher Jesus and Kosher Sex)
- chef and restaurateur David Chang
- Emmy award-winning screenwriter and director Cliff Dorfman (Entourage)
- historian David Eisenbach
- financial educator Alvin Hall
- journalists Ana Kasparian and Cenk Uygur
- survival expert Les Stroud
- Olympic figure skater Johnny Weir
- actor Dean Winters
