= Sith (disambiguation) =

The Sith are an organization and a race affiliated with the Dark Side in the Star Wars universe.

Sith may also refer to:

== Folklore ==
- Sìth, Scottish Gaelic semi-deities, spirits and fairies
  - Daoine Sìth or Aos Sí, Scottish fairies
  - Baobhan sith, a spirit vampire, and the Leanan sídhe, a Manx counterpart
  - Bean sith, more commonly known under the Anglicised spelling "banshee"
  - Cat Sìth, a Scottish fairy cat
  - Cu Sìth, a spirit dog sometimes known as a mound dog who haunts the barrow mounds
- Sith, an angel of an hour (6 to 7 o'clock), or a regent ruling a planet. This is an obscure angel mentioned in A Dictionary of Angels - Including the Fallen Ones by Gustav Davidson

== Star Wars ==
- Star Wars: Episode III – Revenge of the Sith, a 2005 American space opera film written and directed by George Lucas
- "Sith" (Star Wars: Visions)

== Other uses ==
- Shalom in the Home, a reality TV show by the TLC Network
- SITh, static induction thyristor
- A flying hornet-like monster in Edgar Rice Burroughs' Barsoom series of novels
- Sith, used in Terry Goodkind's fantasy series The Sword of Truth as Mord-Sith, women who are raised from young girls and taught in the ways of pain and torture
- Commander Sith, a fictional character in Ghost Trick: Phantom Detective
- A continent mentioned in The Left Hand of Darkness by Ursula K. Le Guin

== See also ==
- Sikh, an adherent of Sikhism
- Cait Sith, a character in Final Fantasy VII
- Staten Island Technical High School, a specialized high school in New York City
