= Commonwealth Foundation (disambiguation) =

The Commonwealth Foundation is an intergovernmental organisation based in the UK.

Commonwealth Foundation may also refer to:

- Commonwealth Foundation for Public Policy Alternatives in Pennsylvania, U.S.

== See also ==
- Commonwealth of Nations
- Commonwealth Fund
- Commonwealth Games Federation
- Commonwealth Institute
