= Aitz Hayim Center for Jewish Living =

Synagogue in Glencoe, Illinois

Aitz Hayim Center for Jewish Living is a post-denominational synagogue in Glencoe, Illinois. Founded in 1992 as a member-led congregation by Dr. Marc Slutsky, Steven Silberman, and Rabbi Irwin Kula, and serves as a synagogue community recognizing and drawing ideology from multiple Jewish traditions.
