= Charlie Gerow =

Republican Party political strategist

Charles R. Gerow
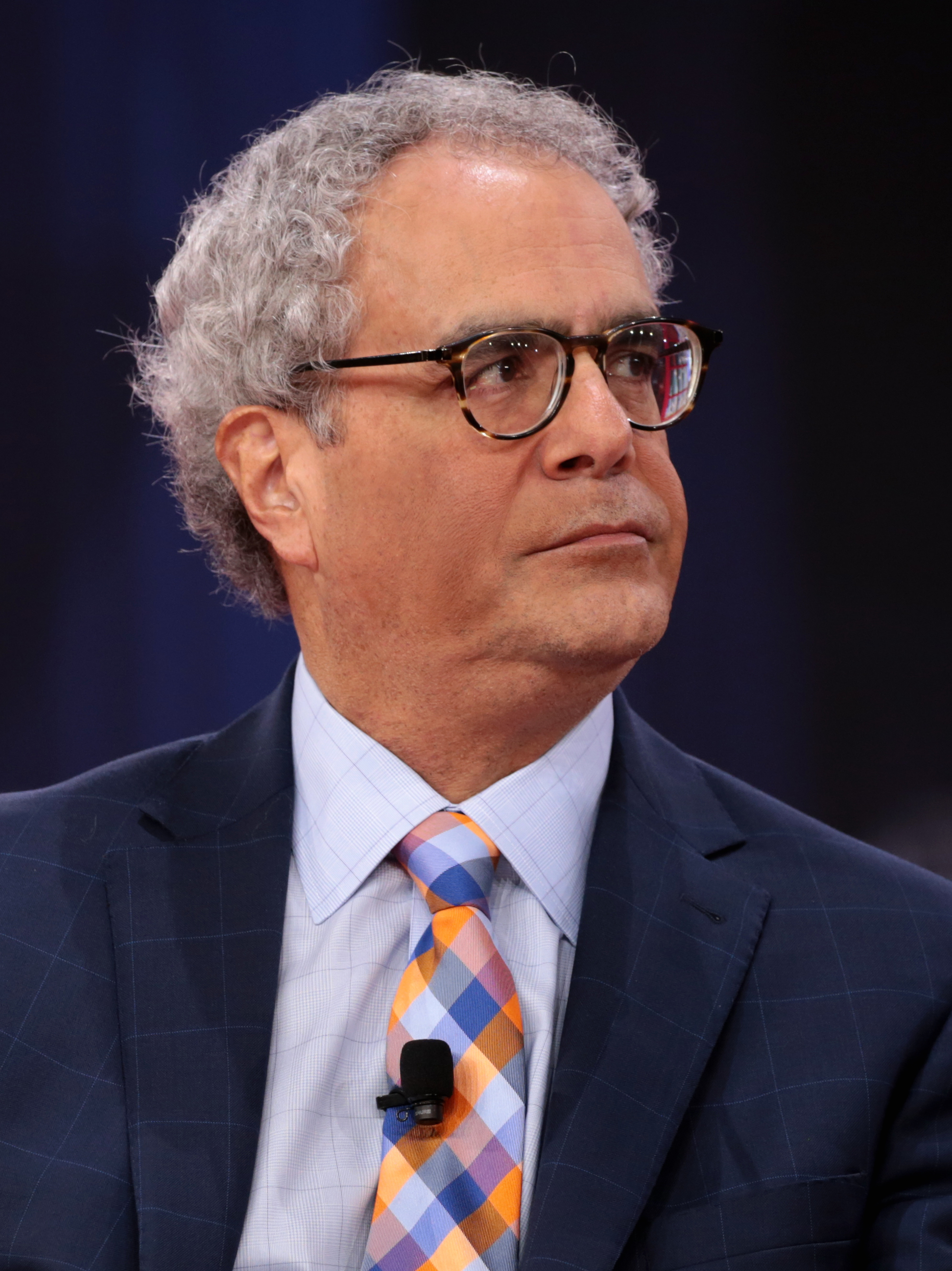
- Gerow in February 2018
- Born: Brazil
- Education: Messiah College (BA); Villanova University (JD)
- Occupation(s): Quantum Communications CEO, Political Consultant and Media Analyst

Charles R. Gerow is an American political strategist of the Republican Party who formerly served as the vice chair of the American Conservative Union.

== Career ==
Gerow holds a J.D. degree from Villanova University School of Law and has been a Pennsylvania attorney for over 40 years. Gerow began his career on the campaign staff of President Ronald Reagan and continued to do political work for President Reagan throughout the next 25 years. He was an Alternate Delegate At Large at the 1988 Republican National Convention, elected as a Delegate to the 2004, 2012, and 2020 Republican National Conventions and an Alternate Delegate to the 2016 Republican National Convention. He has attended every Republican National Convention since 1976.

Gerow is a prominent Republican Party political strategist.

In 2020, Gerow was awarded the prestigious ICON Honor award for lifetime service. Gerow has been named several times to the Central Penn Business Journal’s “Power 100,” most recently in February, 2023. City and State Pennsylvania magazine has named him to their “Power 100” list of “the key players in the Keystone State’s political arena.”

Gerow is one of five Pennsylvania Republicans recognized in the prestigious Influencers 500 by Campaigns and Elections magazine. He's also been named One of the Top 50 Republican Influencers in Pennsylvania by Politics magazine.

Charlie served on the board of directors of the American Conservative Union, the nation's largest and most prestigious conservative organization and the sponsor of CPAC, the Freedoms Foundation at Valley Forge and the American Swiss Foundation.

In 1989, he helped to found the Pennsylvania Leadership Conference. During the 1996 presidential election, Gerow was a surrogate speaker for Bob Dole. In 1998, Gerow was a candidate in the 1998 Republican primary to represent Pennsylvania's 19th congressional district, where he lost to incumbent William F. Goodling. In 2000, he was a candidate in the 2000 Republican primary to represent Pennsylvania's 19th congressional district, where he lost to Todd Russell Platts.

President George W. Bush appointed Gerow to the Benjamin Franklin Tercentenary Commission, and Pennsylvania Governor Tom Corbett appointed Gerow to the Governor's Advisory Council on Privatization and Innovation in 2011.

Gerow served as the First Vice Chairman of the American Conservative Union, and sits on the boards of the Freedoms Foundation at Valley Forge and the American Swiss Foundation. He also serves on the board of the Matthew J. Ryan Center at Villanova University.

He has taught as an adjunct professor at Lebanon Valley College, Dickinson College and Gettysburg College. He works as a political analyst for WHP-TV (CBS 21) in Harrisburg, Pennsylvania. He regularly hosts radio talk shows and has appeared as a commentator on CBS, NBC, ABC, Fox News, MSNBC, CNBC, Fox Business and several national radio programs.

== Involvement in 2020 election aftermath ==
Gerow who regularly attended Pennsylvania's Electoral College proceedings, was an official in the 2016 electoral college.

Gerow was a speaker at Harrisburg rally supporting 2020 election denial.

In 2020 he was part of a group of notable Pennsylvania Republicans who met as alternate electors in Pennsylvania. While some criticized this involvement, reviews by the Office of the Democratic Attorney General suggested that because the Pennsylvanians had used qualifying language they were distinguished from other states that had not.

Gerow also filed amicus curiae briefs on behalf of the vast majority of Republican Members of the Pennsylvania General Assembly in both Texas v. Pennsylvania and Kelly v. Pennsylvania.

== 2021 car crash ==
On July 21, 2021, Gerow was driving along the Pennsylvania Turnpike in Tredyffrin Township, Chester County when his vehicle was struck by a motorcycle. The motorcyclist was killed. Gerow's campaign for Pennsylvania governor said that he was cooperating with Pennsylvania State Police investigators. Witnesses said that Gerow's car was seen driving down the highway with a motorcycle embedded in its grille for several miles before state police eventually pulled Gerow over.

A lawyer for Gerow said that the motorcyclist was involved in a crash with a different vehicle and had been stopped in a Turnpike lane, and said Gerow did not cause the crash.

== 2022 Pennsylvania gubernatorial bid ==
In June 2021, Gerow announced his campaign for Governor of Pennsylvania in 2022. He lost the Republican primary election with only 18,000 votes, placing eighth.

== See also ==
- Stolen Honor
