= Jacob Immanuel Schochet =

Swiss-Canadian rabbi & writer

Jacob Immanuel Schochet (August 27, 1935 – July 27, 2013) was a Swiss-born Canadian Chabad-Lubavitch rabbi, scholar, author, translator, and lecturer renowned for his defense of traditional Jewish beliefs and his expertise in Hasidic philosophy and mysticism.

== Biography ==
=== Early life and education ===
Born in Switzerland to Rabbi Dov Yehuda and Sarah Schochet, he moved with his family to the Netherlands after World War II and to Toronto, Canada, in 1951. There, his family became closer with the Chabad movement, and Schochet eventually decided to study in a Chabad Yeshiva. He studied at the central Chabad yeshiva, Tomchei Temimim, in New York from 1952 to 1959, where he developed a relationship with Rabbi Menachem M. Schneerson, who encouraged his academic pursuits and writing.

On the encouragement of Schneerson, he studied in Canadian Universities, attending the University of Toronto (BA, Phil), University of Windsor (MA, Religious Studies), McMaster University (his MPhil thesis was titled: The Treatment of Anthropomorphism in Targum Onkelos (1966)), and University of Waterloo where he received his PhD in 1974. (His PhD, Phil thesis was titled: The Psychological System of Maimonides (1974)).

=== Career ===
He served as rabbi of the Kielcer Congregation (1959–1996) and later Congregation Beth Joseph Lubavitch in Toronto. He taught philosophy at Humber College (1971–1996), Jewish philosophy and mysticism at Maimonides College, Toronto (1980–1990), and medical ethics at the University of Toronto (1983–1987).

=== Scholarly contributions ===
Author and translator for Kehot Publication Society, he undertook many works at Rabbi Schneerson's directive. His translations include fundamental Chassidic texts such as Tanya, Tzava'at Harivash, and various liturgical works. He also printed many pamphlets on specific Mitzvot, including, Tzitzit, honoring one's parents, and loving one's fellow.

Original books include:

- The Great Maggid (biography of Rabbi Dov Ber of Mezritch, 1974)
- Mystical Concepts in Chassidism (1979)
- The Mystical Dimension (three volumes, 1990)
- Living With Moshiach (1999)
- Prayers, Blessings, Principles of Faith, and Divine Service for Noahides (2010)
- For the Love of Truth (2016)

He also published on topical issues, including Who is a Jew? Shofar Association of America (1986) and Mashiach: The Principle of Mashiach and the Messianic Era in Jewish Law and Tradition (1992), elucidating the Rabbi Schneerson's positions based on classical sources.

=== Activism and influence ===
Schochet was a public speaker and debater, challenging Christian missionaries and cults in the 1970s–1980s, and mentoring young Jews through lectures, retreats, and programs across North America and internationally (including at universities like Yale, UCLA, and Oxford). He influenced thousands to deepen their Jewish commitment.

=== Personal life ===
He married Jettie Schochet in 1961.

Children:

- Rabbi Yitzchak Schochet (London).
- Mrs. Oryah Vogel (Wilmington, Del.);
- Mrs. Sharonne Zippel (Salt Lake City, Utah);
- Rabbi Yisroel Schochet (Los Angeles, Calif.)

Schochet died in Toronto at age 77 following a three year illness.

== Views and critiques ==
=== Anti-missionary activism ===
In the 1970s and 1980s, Schochet was involved in anti-missionaries activities, and working with Jewish youths to bring them back to their Jewish roots. "For a Jew, however, any form of shituf is tantamount to idolatry in the fullest sense of the word. There is then no way that a Jew can ever accept Jesus as a deity, mediator or savior (messiah), or even as a prophet, without betraying Judaism. To call oneself, therefore, a 'Hebrew-Christian,' a 'Jew for Jesus,' or in the latest version a 'messianic Jew,' is an oxymoron. Just as one cannot be a 'Christian Buddhist,' or a 'Christian for Krishna,' one cannot be a 'Jew for Jesus,'" Schochet said. Schochet debated missionaries, including Michael L. Brown.

=== Views on Conservative, Reform, and Reconstructionist Judaism ===
In his book Who is a Jew Schochet asserted: "There can be peaceful co-existence on the communal level, and even cooperation in matters of common concerns; but there is no common ground on the religious-doctrinal level. 'Reform' and 'Conservative' can live with 'orthodox' standards and recognize the titular status of 'orthodox' rabbis. After all, 'orthodox' rabbis are ordained on the basis of their proficiency in knowledge and adjudication of Jewish law (Shulchan Aruch). This will not work in reverse, however, because the requirements for conservative and reform ordination are altogether different."

Regarding Jews who practice Reform Judaism, Conservative Judaism, Reconstructionist Judaism, and other streams of Judaism, Schochet stated: "To be sure, we must condemn wrong and misleading ideologies and practices. But simultaneously we must be of the disciples of Aaron the High Priest: 'Loving peace and pursuing peace, loving our fellow-creatures and bringing them near to the Torah'!".

=== Criticism of women rabbis and egalitarian worship ===
Schochet gave a speech decrying female rabbis as "modern Jezebels" denying the authenticity of halacha, and that counting women towards minyan and allowing women to participate in Torah reading during services "are not only a denial of Jewish tradition but a perversion of common sense."

=== Criticism of non-Orthodox Jewish conversions ===
Regarding the issue of 'Who is a Jew' that arose in Israeli politics in the 1970s, Schochet was a proponent for amending the Israeli Law of Return to recognize only Orthodox conversions to Judaism, as opposed to conversions performed by non-Orthodox Jewish rabbis. He published a book entitled Who Is A Jew? on the subject, wherein he rejected the notion that Jews are a part of one race or that Jews are a nationality. Instead he stated that Jews are united by their Judaism. Schochet adhered to a definition of a Jew as "those who partook in the original covenant of the Jewish faith, which established the eternal bond between God, Torah and Israel, and those who decided to join this covenant at later stages, they and their descendants are Jews."

=== Criticism of the Kabbalah Centre ===
Schochet was an opponent of the non-profit Kabbalah Centre, accusing it of distorting the teachings of the Kabbalah. He characterized their actions as cultish practices. In 1993, the Kabbalah Centre filed a $4.5 million (U.S.) slander and defamation lawsuit in a Canadian court against him, which was still pending in 2004. In 2003 he claimed: "What they teach is heresy". In 2004 he called it a "dangerous cult". In 2007, Schochet called the teachings of the Kabbalah Centre "rubbish"; stating, "it's phony; it's manipulative; it has no spirituality whatsoever. It's not related to the authentic Kabbalah." In 2008 he claimed: "I believe they work using mind manipulation."

=== Defense of Chabad from critics ===
Schochet responded to criticisms of Chabad-Lubavitch by Haredi Rabbi Chaim Dov Keller that appeared in the Jewish Observer, and in the book of Rabbi Dr. (and Professor) David Berger, The Rebbe, the Messiah, and the Scandal of Orthodox Indifference. Schochet attempted to demonstrate that criticisms were unfounded or distorted.

=== Criticism of Kosher Jesus ===
In January 2012, Schochet sent a letter to the Algemeiner Journal, expressing what he described as his "authoritative view" rejecting Shmuley Boteach's book Kosher Jesus, opining that it was "heretical". He wrote "I have never read a book, let alone one authored by a purported frum Jew, that does more to enhance the evangelical missionary message and agenda than the aforementioned book. The grossly distorted message of the book violates basic premises of original and authentic Jewish tradition, thus unavoidably must be rejected for being heretical. It is my sincerest hope that the author recognizes the error of his ways and looks to make amends by retracting the book".

Boteach, for his part, said: "We are the People of the Book. We aren’t the people who ban books." Boteach further responded to Schochet, stating that his "ban" of the book was "arrogant and un-Jewish," as well as "medieval".
