= Oxford University L'Chaim Society =

Former interfaith student society

- Formation: 1989
- Founder: Rabbi Shmuley Boteach
- Founded at: University of Oxford
- Dissolved: 2001
- Location: Oxford, England
- Leader: Rabbi Shmuley Boteach
- Affiliations: Chabad

The Oxford University L'Chaim Society was a student society at the University of Oxford from 1989 to 2001. At its peak, it was the second-largest society within the University of Oxford.

== Name ==
L'Chaim (לחיים le-KHA-im) in Hebrew is a toast meaning "to life".

== History ==
The Oxford University L'Chaim Society was established in 1989 by Rabbi Shmuley Boteach, who had been sent to Oxford by the Lubavitcher Rebbe Menachem Mendel Schneerson in 1988. Accordingly, at its onset the society formed part of the Chabad movement. However, L'Chaim Society evolved to become an independent interfaith, debating society, with thousands of Jewish and non-Jewish members. The society grew to be the second-biggest student organization ever in Oxford, with a membership that included over 5,000 non-Jews.

The society held communal Sabbath dinners every Friday evening. It organized numerous other events and brought to Oxford famous guest speakers from politics, arts, and culture, both Jewish and non-Jewish. They included six Israeli prime ministers (namely Yitzhak Rabin, Yitzhak Shamir, Shimon Peres, Ehud Olmert, Ariel Sharon and Benjamin Netanyahu), former Australian prime minister Bob Hawke, former Soviet Union leader Mikhail Gorbachev, UN Secretary General Javier Pérez de Cuéllar, British politicians Norman Lamont, John Patten, and David Young, U.S. General Robert C. Oaks, Israeli Supreme Court Vice President Elyakim Rubinstein, Mossad Director Isser Harel, Nazi hunter Simon Wiesenthal, Nobel Prize winning author Elie Wiesel, human rights activist Natan Sharansky, novelist Haim Be'er, theoretical physicist Stephen Hawking, historian Benzion Netanyahu, banker Edmond Safra, UK Chief Rabbi Jonathan Sacks, Rabbi/singer Shlomo Carlebach, singers Michael Jackson and Boy George, football player Diego Maradona, and actor Jon Voight.

Some Orthodox patrons became concerned about the direction of the group and the percentage of non-Jewish members, and Boteach was asked to remove some non-Jewish students from the society; others wanted him to exclude gay students. Boteach refused on both counts, and converted the L'Chaim Society from a student society into an independent organization.

== Notable members ==
Many of the Oxford University students who were elected presidents of the society ended up becoming international public figures. For example, presidents of the society included American Baptist Rhodes Scholar and future U.S. Senator Cory Booker, Israeli Ambassador Ron Dermer, Israeli language revivalist Ghil'ad Zuckermann, and American Mormon and future president of Southern Utah University Michael Benson.

Other Oxford University students who were members of the Oxford University L'Chaim Society include Harvard Law School professor Noah Feldman, Australian politician Joshua Frydenberg, Los Angeles Mayor Eric Garcetti, and British-Italian United Nations official Maurizio Giuliano.
