= Centre for Social Studies =

Chilean think tank

Chile's Centre for Social Studies (Spanish: Centro de Estudios Sociales, CESOC) was founded in Rome, Italy, in 1984, preceded in 1974 by its publication "ChileAmérica". The founders were mainly left-wing Chilean politicians close to the government of ousted President Salvador Allende, and who had fled into exile following the 1973 coup d'état by general Augusto Pinochet. Among them, the most prominent were Pinochet victim Bernardo Leighton and José Antonio Viera-Gallo Quesney, who later became the first post-Pinochet president of Chile's Chamber of Deputies (the lower chamber of parliament) in the government of Patricio Aylwin.

The institution, in receipt of funding by leading Italian socialists including Bettino Craxi and Rino Formica, promoted the academic study of Chilean affairs, with the implicit intent of opposing the Pinochet regime, and favouring a return to democracy in the country.

From 1989 onwards, the founding exiles started to return to Chile. In 1991 following the exit from power of General Pinochet, the centre was officially established in Chile's capital Santiago. Whilst remaining firm to its objectives and its political ideology, its academic work gradually left the place to publishing, and the centre established itself as one of Chile's most prominent publishing houses. Authors published by CESOC include Chilean politicians Patricio Aylwin, Ricardo Lagos, and Andrés Allamand, as well as scholars Maurizio Giuliano and Jorge Edwards.
