= Don Eberly =

American political activist (born 1953)

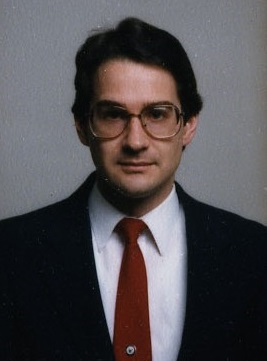
- Eberly in 1986
- Born: 1953 (age 72–73)
- Education: George Washington University; Harvard University; Pennsylvania State University
- Known for: Political writer; researcher

Don E. Eberly (born 1953) is an American author and researcher in the study of civil society. He earned master's degrees from George Washington University and the Kennedy School of Government at Harvard University. He has also performed doctoral work in public affairs at Penn State University. He founded the Commonwealth Foundation for Public Policy Alternatives in the 1980s and served as its first president. He is one of the founders of the Pennsylvania Leadership Conference. He founded the National Fatherhood Initiative in 1993. and served as chairman of the board of directors. He also served as deputy director of the White House Office of Faith-Based and Community Initiatives under George W. Bush. He was named to the PoliticsPA list of "Pennsylvania's Top Political Activists."

== Career ==
Eberly's career combines over 30 years of strategic leadership in national and international affairs, including corporate, government and non-profit executive leadership roles, with key contributions in areas of civil society, economic development and post-war reconstruction. His service includes over two decades in Washington serving in key positions in the Congress, the White House under two Presidents (Deputy Assistant to the President), USAID, Department of Defense (Senior Executive Service), and the State Department. He held key positions on Arab world development, Iraq and Afghanistan reconstruction, and Tsunami recovery.

Eberly is a leader and internationally recognized author of numerous books on topics of American society and international relations, including one award-winning book on nation building in the 21st century and a volume on civil society that is in circulation among reformers in the Middle East. He is the author of Liberate and Leave, a critically praised book that captured the experience of early post-Saddam Iraq.

Eberly served in multiple roles as a senior civilian in support of the U.S. mission in Iraq, covering all phases from pre-war to transition to Iraqi control. He was among the first civilians into Iraq following the removal of Saddam Hussein, serving as a senior advisor under both General Jay Garner and Ambassador Paul Bremer at the Coalition Provisional Authority. He was the first American civilian into Baghdad city hall to organize plans to restore services following the liberation. From 2009 to 2011, Eberly served as a senior advisor for the State Department in Kandahar, traveling with army and Special Forces units across Southern Afghanistan coordinating counterinsurgency programs at the peak of the U.S. surge.

For his service in support of the U.S. mission abroad, Eberly is the recipient of numerous distinguished service awards, including the highest award granted by the Secretary of Defense for joint civilian-military service, and an expeditionary service award from the Secretary of State.

Eberly also spent ten years as a social entrepreneur, founding and building several successful non-profit organizations, including one of the largest state policy think tanks in the country and the National Fatherhood Initiative, now the largest civic organization seeking to increase the number of children raised by committed, engaged fathers.

Eberly holds graduate degrees in fields of government from Harvard (the Kennedy School) and George Washington Universities, and did doctoral studies at Penn State University. Eberly recently concluded 8 years in executive positions with DynCorp International, a top U.S. Defense Company and award-winning employer of veterans

== Works ==
- Eberly, Don (January 1994). Building a Community of Citizens: Civil Society in the 21st Century. Lanham, Maryland: University Press of America. ISBN 978-0-8191-9613-2.
- Eberly, Don; Ryan Streeter (2002). The soul of civil society: voluntary associations and the public value of moral habits. Lanham, Maryland: Lexington Books. ISBN 978-0-7391-0424-8.
- Eberly, Don (1998). America's Promise: Civil Society and the Renewal of American Culture. Lanham, Maryland: Rowman & Littlefield. ISBN 978-0-8476-9229-3.
- Eberly, Don (1994). Restoring the Good Society: A New Vision for Politics and Culture. Hourglass Books (Pennsylvania State University). ISBN 978-0-8010-3226-4.
- Eberly, Don (2000). The essential civil society reader: classic essays in the American civil society debate. Rowman & Littlefield. ISBN 978-0-8476-9719-9.
