= Jonathan Hughes (rabbi) =

British Modern Orthodox rabbi

Jonathan Hughes is the founder and CEO of The Abraham Effect, a charity that works with secondary schools to support Jewish students. He is a British Orthodox rabbi who previously served at Radlett Synagogue in Hertfordshire, England. Previously, he was rabbi at Richmond Synagogue in Richmond, London and associate rabbi at Hendon Synagogue. He is a University College London (UCL) law graduate and a former Swindon Town Football Club and Reading Football Club academy player. Hughes is currently the Rabbi/Jewish Chaplain at Eton College, Harrow School, Westminster School, Marlborough College, Aldenham School and Merchant Taylors’ School.

== Career ==
Years as a community rabbi:

- Hendon United Synagogue (associate) 2011–2013
- Richmond Synagogue 2013–2015
- Radlett United Synagogue 2015–2023
