= Pennsylvania Leadership Conference =

Annual conservative political conference

- Frequency: Annual
- Location: Harrisburg, Pennsylvania
- Inaugurated: 1989
- Patrons: conservative voters
- Website: Official website

Pennsylvania Leadership Conference is an annual two-day conference organized by the Pennsylvania Leadership Council of Pennsylvania conservative activists in Harrisburg, Pennsylvania.

== History ==
The Pennsylvania Leadership Conference was founded in 1989 by a group of conservative activists, including Charlie Gerow, Susan Staub, Jim Panyard, Don Eberly, and John Fluharty, seeking to strengthen the conservative "grassroots lobby" in Pennsylvania. The first conference attracted 300 attendees and featured speakers including Congressmen Robert Smith Walker and Newt Gingrich and State Representatives Joseph R. Pitts and Howard L. Fargo. The Philadelphia Inquirer described it as an "anti-left nirvana." The conference was scheduled during the Republican State Committee of Pennsylvania meeting in Erie, leading commentators to speculate that it was intended to drain support from eventual Republican nominee for Pennsylvania Governor Barbara Hafer because of her pro-choice stance. However, conference organizers denied such an ulterior motive. Due to coronavirus pandemic, 2020's conference was held virtually. In 2025, the conference hosted former White House Press Secretary Kayleigh McEnany.

== Conference presidents and speakers ==
Following the first meeting, the Pennsylvania Leadership Council was founded to coordinate the conference's annual organization, with Lowman S. Henry serving as president. Later presidents included Sean Duffy and Gorden Blain. Speakers at the Pennsylvania Leadership Conference have included M. Stanton Evans, Bill Bennett, Robert Novak, Alan Keyes, Lynne Cheney, Armstrong Williams, Ben Shapiro, Walter Williams, John Gizzi, and David Horowitz. In 2023, Florida Governor Ron DeSantis was a prominent speaker prior to announcing his 2024 Presidential campaign. In 2024 the Conference hosted political film maker Dinesh D’Souza as well as businessman, and 2024 republican presidential hopeful Vivek Ramaswamy.
