= Shmuley Boteach =

American Orthodox rabbi and writer (born 1966)

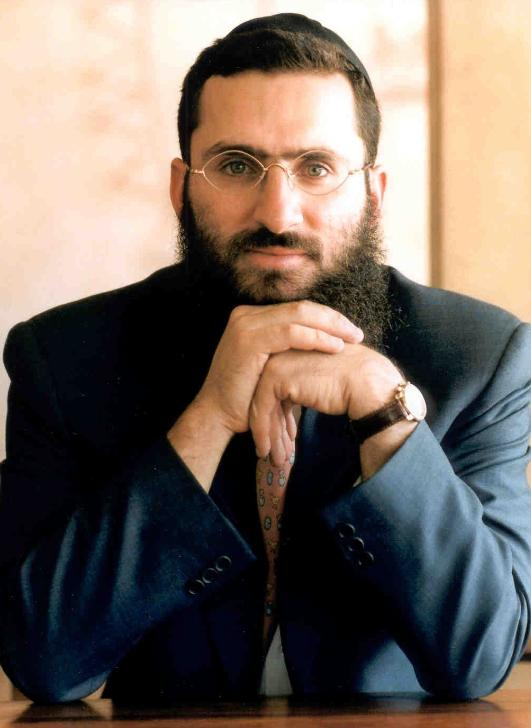
- Boteach in 2010
- Born: Jacob Shmuel Boteach; November 19, 1966 (age 60); Los Angeles, California, U.S.
- Occupations: Rabbi; author; television host; radio host
- Years active: 1988–present
- Notable work: Kosher Sex (1999); Kosher Jesus (2012)
- Television: Shalom in the Home (2006–2007)
- Political party: Republican
- Spouse: Debbie (m. 1988)
- Children: 9
- Relatives: Efraim Diveroli (nephew)
- Website: www.shmuley.com

Jacob Shmuel Boteach, (/boʊˈteɪɑːx/; born November 19, 1966) also known as Rabbi Shmuley, is an American rabbi, author, and media host.

He is the author of 36 books, including the best-seller Kosher Sex: A Recipe for Passion and Intimacy (1999) and Kosher Jesus (2012).

He hosted two seasons of the reality television series Shalom in the Home on TLC.

Newsweek named him one of the 10 most influential rabbis in the United States, and The Jerusalem Post named him one of the fifty most influential rabbis in the world.

== Early and personal life ==
Boteach was born in Los Angeles, California, the youngest of five children. He also spent part of his early years in Miami, Florida. His father Yoav Botach (1932–2020) was an Iranian Jew who left Isfahan with his family of 13 to settle in Israel. His mother Eleanor (1942–2023) was an American Ashkenazi Jew who met his father in Beersheba, Israel, where she was visiting as a tourist. Shortly after their marriage, the couple relocated with their children to New York and then to Los Angeles. Boteach's parents divorced when he was eight years old; on his bar mitzvah, he told his parents he wanted them to reunite.

In 1977, he joined the Miami Boys Choir (then known as the Miami Choir Boys). His most notable solo was in the hit song "Boruch Hashem" in 1979.

Boteach attended a Chabad-Lubavitch camp and fell in love with Judaism. The Lubavitcher Rebbe became his patron, and at age 13, Boteach joined the Chabad movement (a Hasidic philosophy that traces back 250 years to Lubavitch, Russia). At age 14, he decided he wanted to become a rabbi, to help heartbroken people. He studied at Rabbi Alexander S. Gross Hebrew Academy and at a series of yeshivas in Los Angeles, New York, and Jerusalem (for three years at Torat Emet Yeshiva).

Boteach was ultimately chosen as one of ten Chabad students sent to Sydney, Australia, to start a yeshiva. In Sydney, he met the parents of his future wife, Debbie. Boteach met her when he was 21 years old, and they married in Sydney in 1988. He then returned to New York, and took semicha (rabbinical ordination) in 1988.

By 2019, Boteach had nine children, six of whom were born in England. The family resided in Englewood, New Jersey.

== Rabbinical career ==
In 1988, Boteach was sent at age 22 by Rebbe Menachem Mendel Schneerson, as a Chabad-Lubavitch shaliach (emissary), to Oxford, England, where he served as rabbi to Oxford University's students for 11 years. During that time, he founded the Oxford University L'Chaim Society (in Hebrew, L'Chaim means "To Life"). The society grew to be the second-biggest student organization ever in Oxford, with a membership that included over 5,000 non-Jews. It attracted star speakers from politics, arts, and culture, including six Israeli prime ministers, the former Australian prime minister Bob Hawke, the former Soviet Union leader Mikhail Gorbachev, the theoretical physicist Stephen Hawking, the singer Boy George, the football player Diego Maradona, and the actor Jon Voight.

The society's members included Cory Booker, Maurizio Giuliano, Michael Benson, and Eric Garcetti Some Orthodox patrons became concerned about the percentage of non-Jewish members, and after Schneerson died in 1994, Chabad UK leadership asked Boteach to remove non-Jewish students from the society; others wanted Boteach to exclude gay students. Boteach refused on both counts, saying the Rebbe had loved non-Jews and regularly reached out to them; Boteach then changed the L'Chaim Society from a student society into an independent organization.

Later in 1994, after Boteach refused to cancel a speaking event featuring Israeli Prime Minister Yitzhak Rabin, he and Chabad split over the issue. Lubavitch leadership objected to the prime minister speaking, because Schneerson before he died had opposed Rabin's peace deal proposal. After Boteach defied the suspension order, he was summoned to attend a beth din hearing at the Lubavitch World Headquarters. Boteach later confirmed that he was involuntarily terminated by Chabad—but said he still loved Chabad, and was raising his children in the Chabad tradition.

Excerpts from his best-seller Kosher Sex were serialized in Playboy in 1998. Boteach at the time was the leader of Shabbat services at an Orthodox Willesden synagogue in north London, where attendance had more than doubled after his arrival. He resigned from his role at the synagogue. While he had received the support of England's Chief Rabbi, whose office issued a statement saying Boteach was an "imaginative talent... prepared to take risks in order to communicate an authentic Jewish message to a new generation," Boteach wanted to "spare Chief Rabbi Jonathan Sacks problems with his rabbinate and the London Beit Din" according to media reports.

In 1999, the British government's Charity Commission raised concerns over payments made by the L'Chaim Society. In September, the Charity Commission temporarily froze the Society's bank accounts as a "temporary and protective measure", citing concerns about "the application and control" of the charity's funds—however, the Charity Commission released the funds three months later, in December. The Society had made payments on a north London home in which Boteach lived. L'Chaim Society officials explained that the payments had been made only after the Society had consulted with and followed the legal advice of charity experts at a top London law firm. The rabbi said: "This is a totally normal process in the United States." In the immediate wake of the announcement, he was banned from speaking at the New West End Synagogue by Chief Rabbi Sacks. The Charity Commission later found no evidence of wrongdoing, but determined that the mortgage payments were "difficult, if not impossible, to justify" under British law. Boteach reportedly repaid the £150,000 to the trustees, and the issue was resolved with Boteach being cleared.

In 2000, Boteach won the "Preacher of the Year" Award, out of all faiths in Britain, from The Times in London. The Jewish Chronicle described him as "the United Kingdom's most high-profile rabbi". Boteach was listed in the top 10 on Newsweek's "Top 50 Rabbis in America" in 2007 (when it described him as "the most famous rabbi in America"), ninth in 2008, seventh in 2009, and sixth in 2010. The Washington Post referred to him as "the most famous rabbi in America," and The Jerusalem Post named him one of the 50 most influential Jews in the world.

In 2013, Boteach was the commencement speaker for Southern Utah University, which granted him an honorary Doctor of Humane Letters degree.

Boteach has attracted both praise and criticism from fellow rabbis during his career. For example, after the release of his book Kosher Jesus, Rabbi Israel Zoberman wrote that Boteach "offers a well-written scholarly volume that is far from dry and is accessible to all, one that both honors and is critical of [Christians and Jews]," and Israeli-American Rabbi Yechiel Eckstein, of the International Fellowship of Christians and Jews praised it as "courageous and thought-provoking". Similarly, Rabbi Michael Leo Samuel, while noting what Boteach could have added to his book to deepen it, concluded that it was a bold book and that he admired the courage of a Hassidic rabbi wishing: "to talk about Jesus in a manner that is respectful and kind. This is quite a rarity—especially when you consider the animus that most Hassidic and Haredi Jews feel toward Jesus.... All in all I admire his ... willingness to talk about a subject that has remained a forbidden topic of discussion in Jewish circles of all denominations... one can argue that Shmuley's Kosher Jesus should serve as a meaningful first step for many Jews wishing to promote a more truthful and meaningful dialogue with the Christian community." But in contrast, Jacob Immanuel Schochet, a Canadian Orthodox Chabad-Lubavitch rabbi, was fiercely critical, deeming the book to be heretical and asserting that it "poses a tremendous risk to the Jewish community," and saying that "it is forbidden for anyone to buy or read this book," and it "does more to enhance the evangelical missionary message" than any other book. A Chicago Chabad rabbi—who admitted that he had only read the title of the book—wrote an op-ed in which he asserted on that basis alone that the book was apikorus (heresy) and must be treated as such. In reaction, Australian Orthodox Chabad Rabbi Moshe Gutnick, while agreeing with some of what Boteach said and disagreeing with other points, wrote: "The suggestion that [Boteach] is a heretic is simply ludicrous". Rabbi Michael Samuel of Temple Beth Sholom in Chula Vista, California, opined: "Lubavitchers do not want to know anything about Jesus." Boteach, for his part, said: "We are the People of the Book. We aren't the people who ban books."

Boteach is noted for his flamboyance and self-promotion. In an article in The Atlantic, Jeffrey Goldberg referred to him as the "Baal Shem Tov of self-promotion". While promoting his book at the Cheltenham Literature Festival, explaining why he was there he said: "God gave 10 commandments at Sinai, and the 11th commandment, which they expunged but which has come down orally, is 'Thou shalt do anything for publicity and recognition.'" He later described the comment as merely a sarcastic remark.

== Media career ==
In 2006 and 2007, Boteach hosted the one-hour prime-time television series Shalom in the Home. The series, which ran for two seasons on the TLC network, was a reality show in which Boteach counseled dysfunctional families and gave advice to struggling couples about their relationships and parenting. Shalom in the Home attracted almost 700,000 viewers per episode, and was one of the cable network's highest-rated shows. In 2007 he wrote a book with the same name, based on the TV series. That year, The National Fatherhood Initiative gave him its highest award for his efforts in the television series. After the series ended, Boteach remained in contact with the families, counseling them, and having them over to his home. In 2022, the Jewish Journal named Boteach one of "The Top 10 Jewish Reality TV Stars of All Time."

In 2014, Boteach was featured in an episode of the Sundance Channel's Dream School reality television series. It was a non-fiction original series, which introduced troubled teen high school dropouts to mentors, in order to inspire the teenagers to turn their lives around.

On television, he has also made guest appearances on The Oprah Winfrey Show, The Dr. Phil Show, Larry King Live, Dateline NBC, The Today Show, The Howard Stern Show, The View, The O'Reilly Factor, The Dr. Oz Show, and Piers Morgan Uncensored.

On radio, Boteach hosted a weekly nationally syndicated radio program on WABC called The Shmuley Show. It aired on Sunday evenings from 7-9 p.m. He was also host of his own daily talk radio show on the "Oprah and Friends" network on her XM radio channel.

Boteach has written syndicated columns for both The Huffington Post and The Jerusalem Post. He is also an op-ed contributor to The Wall Street Journal, The Washington Post, and other newspapers.

In March 2000, Boteach entered into an agreement with MatchNet (the creator of online dating site Jdate) to become its spokesman for three years, for an annual salary and stock options. After its initial public offering, the company sought to renegotiate his contract at a lower salary. According to his lawsuit, when he refused to renegotiate his agreement he was terminated right before his stock options vested. He claimed that MatchNet hired him to add legitimacy to its public offering, but never intended to fulfill its promises.

In March 2024 Boteach engaged in a public feud with the conservative commentator Candace Owens over her alleged antisemitic remarks (including erroneously claiming that Theodor Herzl was a Frankist) and her support for Palestinians in the Gaza war. In response to Owens's remarks, Boteach dressed up as a "Candace Owens Jew", invoking antisemitic stereotypes like blood libel and a hooknose for the Jewish holiday of Purim.

In November 2025 Boteach sued Alan Dershowitz over comments Dershowitz had made regarding an alleged planned trip to Qatar by Boteach.

== Relationship with Michael Jackson ==
In the late 1990s, Boteach became a friend, close confidant, and spiritual advisor of the singer Michael Jackson. Jackson and his children joined the Boteach family at their home on many Friday nights for Sabbath dinner, and Jackson gave the family a dog as a present. Boteach was a vocal supporter of Jackson and was initially "dismissive of suggestions that Jackson's relationships with children have been anything other than wholesome. "Why would anyone believe those charges? They said anyone who spends that amount of time with kids has to be sick. Well, that's not an indictment of Michael Jackson, that's an indictment of our society!" He said further: "I was friendly with Michael for a year before anyone knew about it. I did my own investigation. He never had sex with the child he made the settlement with, and there are no others."

Boteach served as president for the Heal the Kids offshoot (established by Boteach and Jackson in 2000) of the Heal the World Foundation charity founded by Jackson to encourage parents to spend more time with their children, and to help children threatened by war and disease by providing them with medicine and food. Jackson said: "Our goal is simple: to recreate the parent-child bond, renew its promise, and light the way forward for all the beautiful children who are destined one day to walk this earth." Heal the Kids was linked to the L'Chaim Society. The blogger Roger Friedman claimed that donations to Heal the Kids were actually going to L'Chaim Society, and that Denise Rich who donated $100,000 by check to the L'Chaim Society was unaware that the funds would go to Boteach's organization; Rich declined to comment. Responding to the claims, Boteach accused Friedman, who was fired from Fox News in 2009, of holding a bias against Jackson, and having poor journalism ethics, saying: "Roger Friedman is the foremost Michael Jackson hater on planet earth. He was fired by Fox News for being an unscrupulous reporter."

Boteach later disavowed his relationship with Jackson. The two had a falling-out in 2002, after Jackson did not stick to the recovery programs they had worked out, which included his waking up at a reasonable hour and not being alone with children other than Jackson's own kids, and after Jackson's second arrest on charges of sexually abusing a child. According to an article in the British tabloid The Sun, Jackson allegedly kept an "enemy list" after their relationship ended on which Boteach appeared, along with Uri Geller (who differed with Jackson about his drug habits), attorney Gloria Allred, district attorney Tom Sneddon, music executive Tommy Mottola, and Janet Arvizo (the mother of a Jackson accuser).

After Jackson died of acute propofol intoxication in 2009, Boteach published The Michael Jackson Tapes. The book was drawn from 30 hours of interviews Boteach had with Jackson that were taped with Jackson's approval, and that Jackson intended to be used in a book. In the tapes, Jackson spoke of his childhood scars and demanding father, the price of fame, his friendships with Madonna and Brooke Shields, married life, his relationship with children, his shyness, his fear of growing old, spirituality, and racism. Boteach wrote in the prologue: "This book is being published because it was Michael Jackson's desperate wish that it be so". Vibe wrote: "It's perhaps Michael's most lucid look at the man in the mirror," and The San Diego Tribune wrote: "The Michael Jackson Tapes breaks little in the way of new ground but the book ... provides firsthand detail about the performer's excesses and obsessions." At the same time, the publication was criticized by Nathan Rabin, writing for The A.V. Club, who opined that the book was the "worst kind of posthumous cash-in". Boteach published a second related book in 2010, entitled: Honoring the Child Spirit: Inspiration and Learning from Our Children, in conversation with Michael Jackson.

== The World Values Network and Zionist activism ==
Boteach is the founder and executive director of The World Values Network (also known as "This World: The Values Network"), a Jewish and Zionist non-profit organization that he established in 2007. The mission of the organization is to "disseminate universal Jewish values in politics, culture, and media". The organization is founded on the belief that Judaism, with its emphasis on perfecting the world and celebrating life, can help America address some of its greatest challenges, such as high divorce rates, teenager alienation, depression, and increasing ignorance and materialism.

The organization holds an annual Champions of Jewish Values International Awards gala. The gala has honored figures across the fields of politics, business, journalism and entertainment who have promoted Israel and Jewish values.

The organization collects donations and has funded newspaper advertisements about antisemitism and anti-Zionism. It has placed ads condemning celebrities that criticize Israel or support Palestinians including Lorde, Natalie Portman, Dua Lipa, Bella Hadid and Gigi Hadid, Secretary of State John Kerry's work towards the 2015 Iran nuclear deal, Congresswoman Rashida Tlaib, and U.S. Representative Ilhan Omar for her anti-Zionist remarks.

In 2015, US National Security Advisor Susan Rice criticized Israeli Prime Minister Benjamin Netanyahu for agreeing to speak to Congress about Iran's nuclear program without coordinating with the Obama administration. The World Values Network placed an ad in The New York Times in response that read "Susan Rice has a blind spot: Genocide", and said that her action had "injected a degree of partisanship" that is "destructive of the fabric of the relationship" between the US and Israel. The ad faced widespread criticism by Jewish organizations. In an article for The Washington Post, rabbi Jill Jacobs also criticized Boteach for the ad and labeling himself "America's rabbi," as no such position exists. Jacobs wrote "Rabbi Boteach may claim to be America's rabbi. But America's real rabbis are the ones who reject cowardly attacks and take the risk of standing up for the rights of all people." After continued backlash, Boteach apologized, saying that the disagreement was over policy, and he did not intend to make a personal attack. Speaking to CNN, he said the purpose of the ad was to bring attention to his perception that the United States government has ignored genocides in the past, and continues to do so.

In 2018, the New Zealand singer Lorde cancelled a Tel Aviv concert in support of the Boycott, Divestment, and Sanctions movement. The World Values Network placed an ad in response, calling her a "bigot". The criticism was one of several denunciations from well-known Israelis and Zionist leaders of her cancellation, and the Zionist Federation of New Zealand and the Jewish Council of New Zealand were also critical of her, though the ad itself was met with a distancing by the council.

On May 23, 2021, the organization ran a full-page New York Times ad calling on Dua Lipa, Gigi Hadid, and Bella Hadid to condemn Hamas, claiming the group "calls for a second Holocaust." Lipa and the Hadids' comments came after reporting by Human Rights Watch and B'Tselem. Boteach wrote that Lipa and Bella Hadid accused Israel of "ethnic cleansing, even as millions of Jews in Israel descend from Holocaust survivors, refugees savagely forced out of every Arab land and Jews living in pre-state Israel who were subjected to multiple Arab massacres and pogroms," and accused them of antisemitism for having "vilified the Jewish state". He called for them to consider condemning Hamas instead of Israel, for its brutality toward women, tolerance for honor killings of young Palestinian girls, use of children as human shields for military stockpiles and rocket launch-pads, murders of LGBT Palestinians, and avoidance of fair elections "after fourteen autocratic years." Lipa rejected what she characterized as "the false and appalling allegations" and said that WVN used her name "shamelessly" to "advance their ugly campaign with falsehoods and blatant misrepresentations."

The New York Daily News reported on the organization's tax filing in 2009, two years after the organization's founding, and noted that it raised $651,000, and paid $638,000 in operating and administrative expenses combined (including a $229,000 salary for Boteach—up from $59,000 the prior year, and $70,000 in charitable disbursements). The organization paid Boteach a director salary of $330,371 in 2015.

== Views ==
=== Marriage ===
In his 2014 book Kosher Lust, Boteach said that lust, rather than love, is the glue to a healthy marriage. The book's subtitle is "Love is not the Answer". He believes married couples should focus on having a strong sexual connection. Boteach writes of three "pillars of lust" that he believes ensure an exciting marriage: unavailability ("Eros thrives in the shadows"), mystery (keeping some things private), and sinfulness (being novel and risqué in couples' sex lives; "anything that makes you more hooked" is permissible in the bedroom). He expands upon his view, saying that the essence of lust is desire. "I want you; I can't live without you; my life is empty without you; I will forsake everything for you — the intensity, that passion. And I don't just mean physical lust, like lust for the body, because that wanes... I mean the natural gravitation of two energies — masculine to feminine, feminine to masculine." He also opines that of course one needs "respect, appreciation, compliments, shared values." But says that if one is in a marriage where one does not deeply desire the other person, "you are in a jail cell. It's a form of incarceration."

He also says that the essence of lust and desire is "chosen," and that a woman – in particular – wants to feel chosen. He in addition is of the view that when men do not speak to their wives, which happens for a variety of reasons, that causes their wives to feel a great deal of pain.

As to underpinnings of his views in Judaism, Boteach opines that all of the notable marriages in the Bible are lust relationships, rather than love relationships. He points out that Jacob waits seven years for Rachel but for Jacob it feels like just a few days, and that the first thing Rebecca does when she meets Isaac is put a veil over her face.

He also points to the Bible's Song of Solomon, a poem that describes the yearning of a man for a woman: "Your breasts are like two fawns, like twin fawns of a gazelle that browse among the lilies... Your stature is like that of the palm, and your breasts like clusters of fruit. I said, 'I will climb the palm tree; I will take hold of its fruit'." He wrote that it is part of Jewish Talmudic law that a man must ensure that his wife reaches orgasm before he does.

=== Sexuality ===
Boteach's book Kosher Sex: A Recipe for Passion and Intimacy (1999) was a best seller. The Washington Post referred to him as "Dr. Ruth with a yarmulke" (perhaps unaware that Dr. Ruth herself was also an Orthodox Jew), and the British media called the book the "kosher Kamasutra". His philosophy is that "passionate lovemaking ... leads to intimacy" and is the foundation of a relationship. He opined: "Only sex has the capacity to bring in its wake an overwhelming tidal wave of positive emotion which makes us feel intensely good about each other ... which conversation can't do, which friendship can't do, which shared experiences can't do." He is also of the view that while one does not have to be religious to love sex, it helps, and while one does not have to be married to have great sex, it helps. He opined: "Couples should have the dirtiest sex where they can't control themselves, where the beast within is awakened. That's what passion is all about. In order to have that, you need a modest exterior. That is eroticism." To achieve that, he is in favor of anything that fans the spark between a married couple, including (when he is asked) oral sex and sex toys. At the same time, because he believes they distract or dull one's sexual edge, he is against the lights being on and masturbation. He also believes that people ought to refrain from sex before marriage, because it is "bad sex".

Backstage at The Today Show, he ran into the former U.S. Secretary of State Henry Kissinger, who asked for a signed copy of the book. At the same time, the book caused a stir in the Orthodox community—even so, in the summer of 2012 it was the most checked-out non-fiction book in Crown Heights, Brooklyn, which houses the center for Chabad Jewry in America.

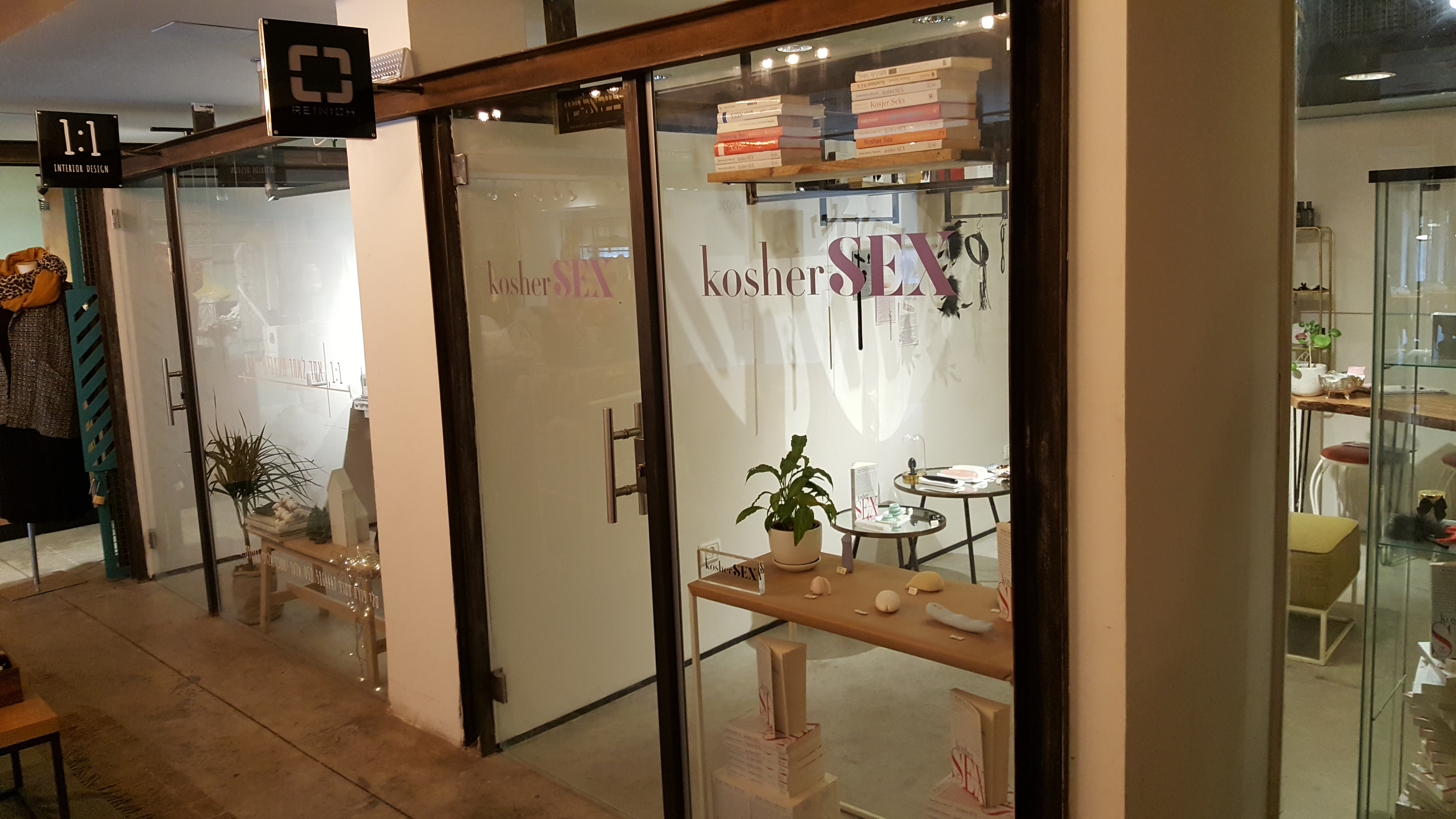
Kosher Sex boutique in Jerusalem

One of the rabbi's daughters, Chana Boteach, followed up on her father's theme years later. In 2019 when she was 28 years old she opened a boutique Kosher Sex shop in Tel Aviv (subsequently, she opened one in Jerusalem), and also began selling its products online.

==== Homosexuality ====
Boteach wrote in a 2010 Wall Street Journal op-ed column on homosexuality that he does not deny that there is a biblical prohibition on male same-sex relationships, and a commandment for men and women to marry and have children. Still, he understands those in context. "There are 613 commandments in the Torah... So when Jewish gay couples tell me they have never been attracted to members of the opposite sex and are desperate [and] alone, I tell them 'You have 611 commandments left. That should keep you busy. Now, go create a kosher home ... you are His beloved children.'" Five years later he wrote that he believed in the equality of all of God's children, and has seen too much homophobia in his life. He believes that the biggest threat to marriage does not come from gay marriage, but heterosexual divorce, which he says afflicts half of marriages. He opposes government involvement at all in recognizing marriage, but supports state-sanctioned civil unions for all.

=== COVID-19 pandemic ===
Speaking about the COVID-19 pandemic, Boteach said "I utterly reject and find it sickening when people believe that this is some kind of punishment from God – that really upsets me." He also said that he found it: "very upsetting when religious leaders don't shut down their synagogues, churches, or mosques because they believe that prayer is more important than preserving life." As his father died during the pandemic and his brother became sick with COVID-19, he wrote about the difficulty of dealing with those tragedies during the pandemic.

=== Outreach to non-Jews ===
In 2008, he debated Douglas Jacoby and Shabir Ally, on The True Legacy of Abraham, and the next year he debated Douglas Jacoby on "Judaism & Christianity: Which is the Religion of Peace?" In 2008, he debated Michael Brown, a leader of the Messianic Jews, on whether belief in Jesus is compatible with Judaism, and in his book Kosher Jesus he depicts Jesus as "a Jewish patriot murdered by Rome for his struggle on behalf of his people." These positions drew opposition from Yitzchak Schochet, a British rabbi who was a rival of Boteach's, who called Boteach's attempts to reach out to Messianic Jews "self-delusional". Boteach is also of the view that while the Chabad movement's objective is to serve all Jews, its philosophy also extends to helping others become stronger in their respective religions.

=== Jesus and Christianity ===
In his 2012 book Kosher Jesus, Boteach takes the position that Jesus was a wise and learned Torah-observant rabbi, and a beloved member of the Jewish community. At the same time, he writes Jesus despised the Romans for their cruelty, and fought them courageously. He states that the Jews had nothing whatsoever to do with the murder of Jesus, but rather that blame for his trial and killing lies with the Romans and Pontius Pilate. Boteach states that he does not believe in Jesus as the Jewish Messiah. At the same time, Boteach argues that "Jews have much to learn from Jesus — and from Christianity as a whole — without accepting Jesus' divinity. There are many reasons for accepting Jesus as a man of great wisdom, beautiful ethical teachings, and profound Jewish patriotism." He concludes by writing, as to Judeo-Christian values, that "the hyphen between Jewish and Christian values is Jesus himself."

==== Presbyterian Church ====
In a June 2014 column for the Jerusalem Post, Boteach heavily criticized the US Presbyterian Church after it voted to divest from three American companies (Caterpillar, Hewlett-Packard, and Motorola Solutions) doing business in Israel. The Church described the divestment as "a last resort, as a matter of faithful stewardship, when it becomes apparent that an investment can no longer be part of a constructive partnership for good. Presbyterians believe firmly that their investments must be in alignment with their values." Boteach wrote in response, "the rotting corpse of the Presbyterian Church got another nail in its coffin with the vote on Friday" and "the Church demonstrates that it has no moral compass."

=== Israel–Palestine conflict ===
Boteach is an outspoken Zionist. He was critical of the Obama administration's "bullying" attitude towards Israel, calling it "scandalous" and "disgusting". Boteach is also supportive of Israeli settlements in the Palestinian territories, which have been condemned as illegal by the United Nations, International Court of Justice, and the rest of the international community. Boteach described the Hebron settlement as "warmth, friendliness and hospitality" and "liberated from hatred". The community has received sustained criticism for maintaining a shrine to Baruch Goldstein, the mass murderer who perpetrated the Cave of the Patriarchs massacre. It also serves as a pilgrimage site for extremists.

Boteach was supportive of President Donald Trump's Israel policies, and called him "the most pro-Israel president in history". Two of his children have served as soldiers in the Israel Defense Forces.

=== Infant circumcision ===
Boteach has argued in favor of infant male circumcision, defending the practice on religious grounds and health grounds, while contrasting it sharply with female genital mutilation. He said that to compare the excising of a male foreskin with the removal of a female clitoris is a lie, as "female circumcision is all about removing a woman's ability to experience pleasure during sex, and is a barbarous act of mutilation that has no corollary to its male counterpart." He says that "Judaism celebrates the sexual, intimate and erotic bond between husband and wife, and attempts to portray circumcision as a method of denying a man's sexual pleasure are ignorant."

He has also advocated for the medical benefits of male circumcision reducing the transmission and incidence of HIV-AIDS, other STDs such as genital herpes and syphilis, urinary-tract infections, penile cancer, and other adverse health conditions, pointing to a report in the British Medical Journal.

Discussing New Testament mention of male circumcision, Boteach noted that when Jesus is criticized for healing a crippled man on the Sabbath (John 5:1-47), Jesus quotes a legal precedent preserved later in the Talmud (Tractate Yoma) to prove that his action is justified, saying: "Now if a boy can be circumcised on the Sabbath so that the Law of Moses may not be broken, why are you angry with me for healing a man's whole body on the Sabbath?" (7:23 NIV).

Boteach has written op-eds in The Wall Street Journal and the Huffington Post denouncing legislation to limit male circumcision.

=== Pornography ===
Boteach has been critical of pornography. In 2016, he co-authored a viral Wall Street Journal opinion piece with actress and former Playboy model Pamela Anderson, in which they called online pornography a "public hazard of unprecedented seriousness". Boteach observed: "It can be intimidating to talk about pornography and eroticism alongside an international sex symbol, but I think Pamela has handled it extremely well." The two also wrote a book together, Lust for Love (2018), about how meaningful, passionate sex has been declining, and calling for a new sensual revolution that emphasizes partners connecting in the bedroom. In 2001, he publicly debated pornography with Jewish Playmate Lindsey Vuolo.

=== Racism ===
In November 2016, Boteach wrote a piece in The Hill defending Breitbart News executive chairman Steve Bannon after his appointment to the White House was condemned by the Anti-Defamation League (ADL).

In December 2022, in response to increasing instances of racism and antisemitism in the United States, Boteach, Reverends Al Sharpton and Conrad Tillard, New York City Mayor Eric Adams, Carnegie Hall Chairman Robert F. Smith, and Elisha Wiesel joined to host 15 Days of Light, celebrating Hanukkah and Kwanzaa in a unifying holiday ceremony at Carnegie Hall. Boteach said: "This is the way it should be. Blacks and Jews united to promote human dignity and fight the haters."

== 2012 Congressional elections ==
Boteach, a self-described social moderate, ran for the U.S. House of Representatives in northern New Jersey in the 2012 elections. He became the first rabbi ever to run for the U.S. Congress as a Republican, and had he won he would have been the first rabbi in Congress. Referring to the 50% divorce rate in the United States as "an American tragedy that no one talks about," he supported making marriage and family counseling tax-deductible to help strengthen marriages and lower the nation's divorce rate. He also supported a federal school voucher system, lower taxes, a flat tax and simplification of the tax code, smaller government, and preventing Iran from building a nuclear weapon. He received the endorsement of then-House Majority Leader Eric Cantor (R-Va.).

Boteach won the Republican primary for New Jersey's 9th congressional district seat in a three-way race on June 5. He received 57.9% of the vote, defeating Hector Castillo with 28.3% of the vote, and Blase Billack with 13.8% of the vote.

In the November general election he faced eight-term Democratic 8th District Representative and former mayor of Paterson, New Jersey, Bill Pascrell. Boteach gave a $250 donation to his opponent, because he wanted them to have a Friday night Shabbat dinner date together at his home to get to know each other as people before they were opponents, and he was hoping his donation would get Pascrell's attention after several unsuccessful attempts to arrange the dinner. Pascrell raised more money than any other congressional candidate in the state in 2012, $2.6 million, 10x what Boteach raised. Boteach lost in the overwhelmingly Democratic district, where Democrats outnumbered Republicans by 3-to-1, by a margin of 73.6% to 25.4%. In his concession speech Boteach said: "He is now my Congressman. I pledge my complete support to him."

== Selected bibliography ==
- Boteach, Shmuley (1999). Kosher Sex: A Recipe for Passion and Intimacy. Doubleday. ISBN 0-385-49465-3.
- Boteach, Shmuley (2002). Kosher Adultery: Seduce and Sin with Your Spouse. Adams Media. ISBN 978-1-58062-792-4.
- Boteach, Shmuley (2006). 10 Conversations You Need to Have with Your Children. HarperCollins. ISBN 978-0-06-173590-5.
- Boteach, Shmuley (2008). The Broken American Male: And How to Fix Him. St. Martin's Press. ISBN 978-0-312-54150-7.
- Boteach, Shmuley (2009). The Kosher Sutra; Eight Sacred Secrets for Reigniting Desire and Restoring Passion for Life. HarperCollins. ISBN 978-0-06-166835-7.
- Boteach, Shmuley (2009). The Michael Jackson Tapes: A Tragic Icon Reveals His Soul in Intimate Conversation. ReadHowYouWant.com. ISBN 978-1-4587-8061-4.
- Boteach, Shmuley (2011). 10 Conversations You Need to Have with Yourself: A Powerful Plan for Spiritual Growth and Self-Improvement. Wiley India Pvt Limited. ISBN 978-81-265-3418-0.
- Boteach, Shmuley (2012). Kosher Jesus. Gefen Publishing House. ISBN 978-965-229-578-1.
- Boteach, Shmuley (2014). Kosher Lust: Love Is Not the Answer. Gefen Publishing House. ISBN 978-965-229-626-9.
- Boteach, Shmuley (2019). The Fed-Up Man of Faith: Challenging God in the Face of Suffering and Tragedy. Amazon. ISBN 978-1-0961-5829-5.
- Boteach, Shmuley (2021). Holocaust Holiday: One Family's Descent into Genocide Memory Hell. Post Hill Press. ISBN 978-1-64293-780-0.

Party political offices
Preceded by Michael Agosta	Republican nominee for the U.S. House of Representatives from New Jersey's 9th District; 2012	Succeeded by Dierdre G. Paul
