= Centre for American Studies =

Academic institution in Havana, Cuba

The Centre for American Studies (Spanish: Centro de Estudios sobre América, CEA) is an academic institution in Havana, Cuba. Established along similar institutions by the Cuban Government in 1964, it was intended to serve at the same time to provide intelligence information for Cuban leaders, and to provide propaganda by proposing to international audiences Cuban views on certain topics.

The centre became renowned in the 1990s, when some of its most prominent members, including economist Julio Carranza and Pedro Monreal, and sociologists Haroldo Dilla and Aurelio Alonso, started to promote views that were not in concert with those of the government. This led in 1996 to a purge of the institution, resulting in all its core academics being transferred to other functions. Many of them were also expelled from the Cuban Communist Party, and some left the country.

The purge was exposed by Maurizio Giuliano in his book "El Caso CEA: Intelectuales e Inquisodores en Cuba - ¿ Perestrojka en la Isla ?", published in 1998 in Miami, Florida. The book, a work of investigative journalism complemented by academic analysis, dealt a strong blow to hard-liners within the regime, by exposing for the first time the internal conflicts between Cuba's apparatus and its intelligentsia.
