= Irwin Kula =

American rabbi and author (born 1957)

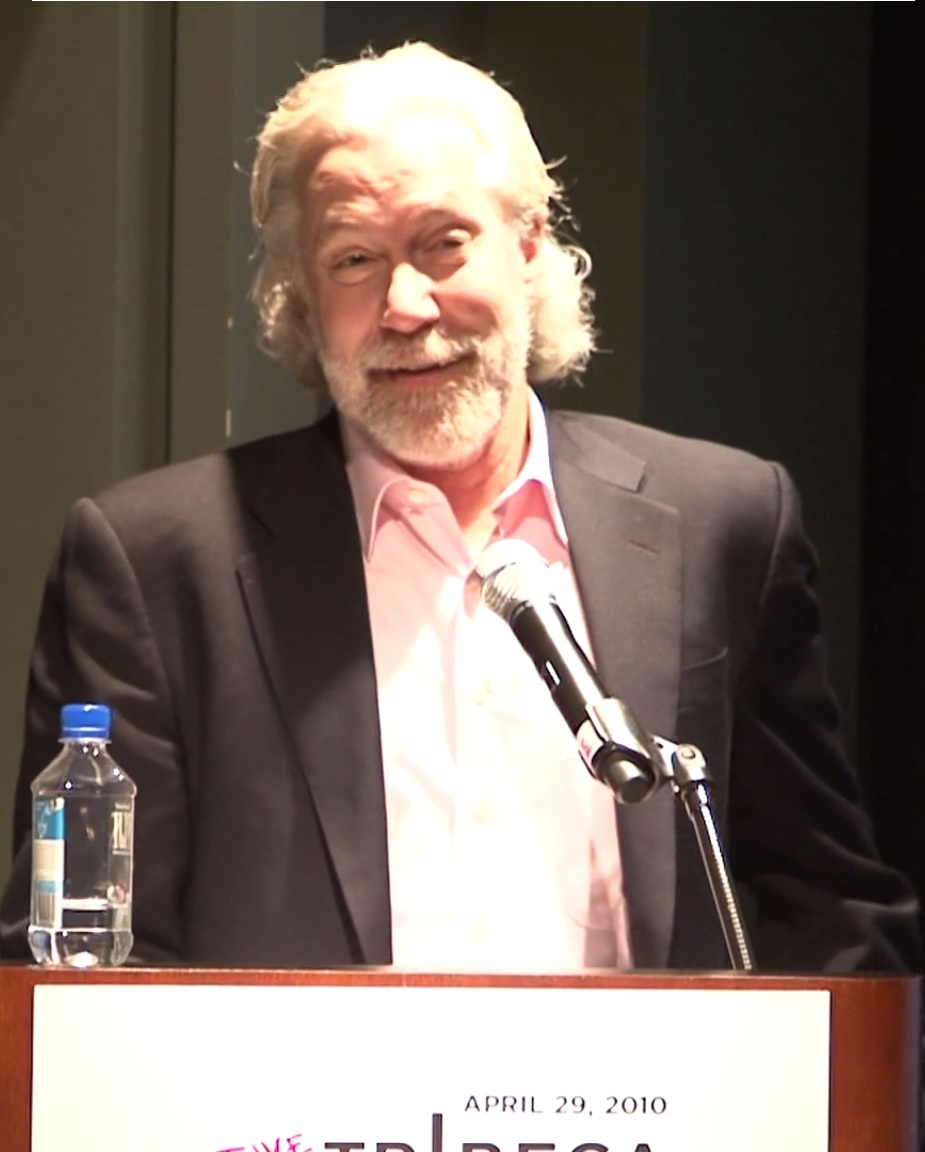
Rabbi Irwin Kula at Tribeca Disruptive Innovation Awards 2010

Irwin Kula (born November 29, 1957) is an American rabbi and author, currently serving as the president of the National Jewish Center for Learning and Leadership (CLAL). In 2008, he was listed as 7th in Newsweek's "50 most influential rabbis" list, and the following year he was listed in 10th position.

== Education ==
Kula is a seventh-generation rabbi. He received his B.A. degree in Philosophy from Columbia University, B.H.L. from The Jewish Theological Seminary of America (JTSA), and M.A. in Rabbinics and Rabbinic Ordination from the JTSA.

== Career ==
In 2003, Kula hosted a 13-part public TV series, Simple Wisdom with Irwin Kula, and had a public TV special called The Hidden Wisdom of Our Yearnings. He was also featured in the 2004 film Time for a New God.

Kula, speaking of the reality TV show Shalom in the Home of Rabbi Shmuley Boteach, said: "He's trying to take an ancient tradition that has been familial, tribal, and inwardly focused, and translate it into an American idiom so it can benefit the larger society. He's essentially bringing the Torah to the marketplace of ideas, and there are very few people doing this."

Kula is the author of Yearnings: Embracing the Sacred Messiness of Life, and a co-editor of The Book of Jewish Sacred Practices: CLAL's Guide to Everyday & Holiday Rituals and Blessings. He is also the co-host of the weekly radio show, Hirschfield and Kula (KXL, Portland, OR). He is a blogger for The Huffington Post and the Washington Post/Newsweek's "On Faith" column, and has appeared on NBC's The Today Show, The Oprah Winfrey Show, The O'Reilly Factor, and Frontline.

Kula is an adjunct faculty member at the United Theological Seminary, teaching courses in practical theology.

== Interfaith relations ==
Kula has expressed opposition to proposals for the beatification of Pope Pius XII, who was bishop of Rome during the challenging eras of the Second World War and the Cold War. In January 2009, he also argued that the Jewish reaction to the lifting of the excommunication of bishop Richard Williamson was rather disproportionate. In July 2010, he strongly criticized the Anti-Defamation League, a Jewish civil rights organization, for its opposition to the construction of Cordoba House, an Islamic cultural center and mosque planned to be built near the World Trade Center site in New York City.

== Awards ==
Kula was a recipient of the 2008 Walter Cronkite Faith and Freedom Award. He was named as one of the leaders shaping the American spiritual landscape by both Fast Company magazine and PBS's Religion and Ethics Newsweekly.

Kula received a “Books for a Better Life” award, and his book Yearnings: Embracing the Sacred Messiness of Life was selected by Spirituality and Health Magazine as one of the "10 Best Spiritual Books of 2006".
