= Richmond Synagogue =

Orthodox Jewish community in London

- Location of the synagogue in Greater London

Religion
- Affiliation: Orthodox Judaism
- Ecclesiastical or organisational status: Synagogue
- Leadership: Rabbi Chaim Golker
- Status: Active

Location
- Location: Lichfield Gardens, Richmond, Borough of Richmond upon Thames, London, England TW9 1AP
- Country: United Kingdom
- Coordinates: 51°27′44″N 0°17′59″W

Architecture
- Architect: Stern Thom Fehler (1987)
- Established: c. 1700s (as a congregation)
- Completed: 1916 (Central Hall); 1938 (8 Sheen Road); 1987 (Lichfield Gardens)

Website
- richmondsynagogue.org.uk

Richmond Synagogue is an Orthodox Jewish congregation and synagogue, located at Lichfield Gardens, in Richmond, in the Borough of Richmond upon Thames, London, England, in the United Kingdom. The congregation has 250 members and is a member community of the United Synagogue.

== History ==
A Jewish community is known to have existed in Richmond in the late 17th century. King William III dined with Solomon de Medina, a Jewish businessman, at his country house in Richmond in November 1699.

Until 1916, Richmond's Jewish religious community was known as the Richmond Hebrew Congregation. From 1916 to 1938, as Richmond Associate Synagogue, it met at Central Hall, Parkshot, Richmond, a building opened on 28 June 1916 by Leopold de Rothschild, the then-President of the United Synagogue. From 1938, the renamed Richmond District Synagogue met at a converted chapel at 8 Sheen Road, which was compulsorily purchased by Richmond upon Thames Council to make way for a Waitrose supermarket and multi-storey car park.

Designed by Stern Thom Fehler Architects, a new purpose-built synagogue building at Lichfield Gardens was opened on 8 March 1987 by Chief Rabbi Sir Immanuel Jakobovits and Rabbi Moshe Barron. A rabbi's house was later built on part of the synagogue's car park.

== Clergy ==
Richmond Synagogue's rabbi, since 2022, is Chaim Golker. Previous rabbis have included Maurice Ginsberg (1922–61), Yitzchak Schochet (1991–93), Jonathan Hughes (2013–15), Yossi Ives (2003–12) and Meir Shindler (2016–2022).

== Notable members ==
- Eldred Tabachnik
- Lord Woolf

== Galleries ==
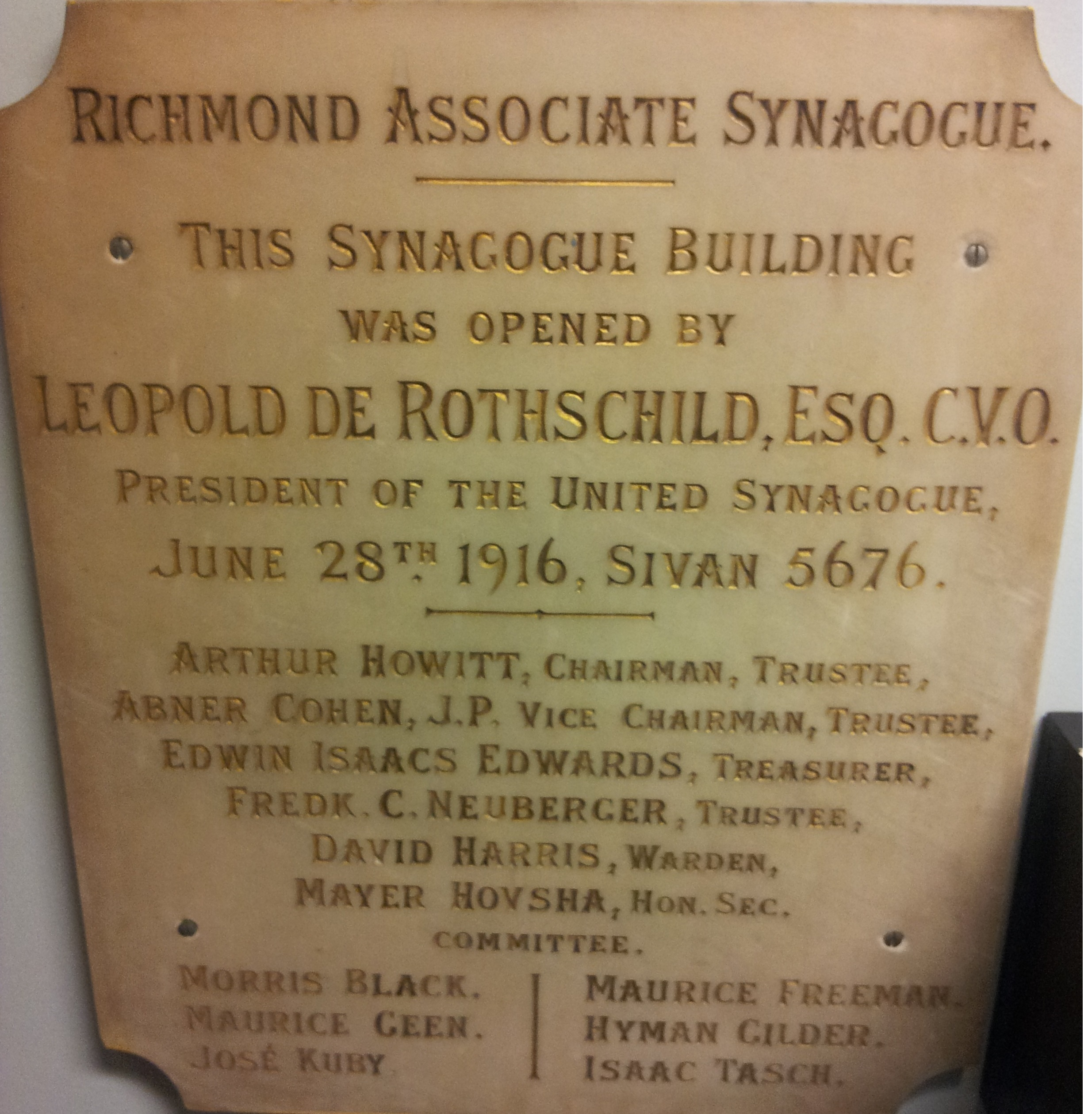
Plaque inside the synagogue, 1916

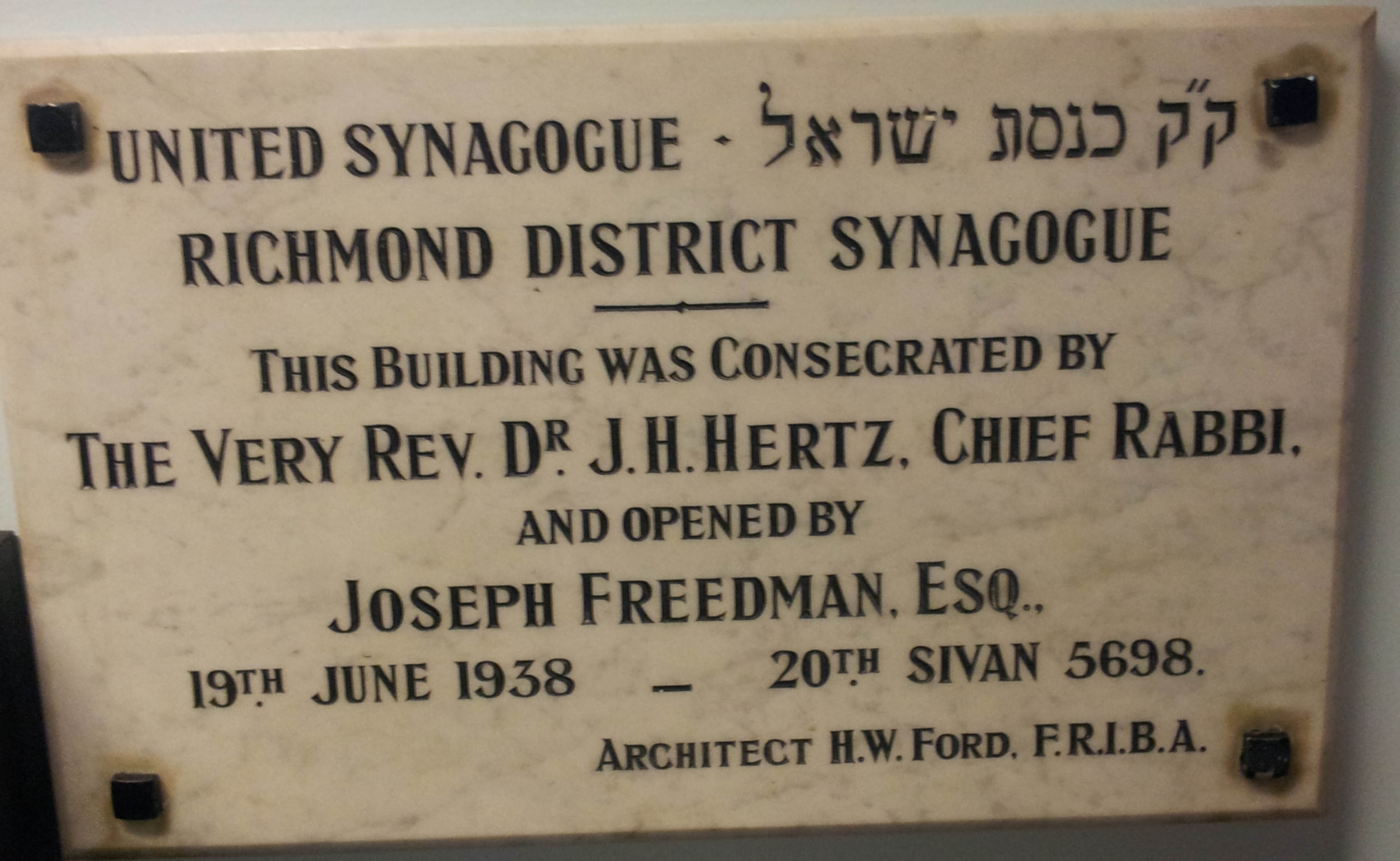
Plaque inside the synagogue, 1938

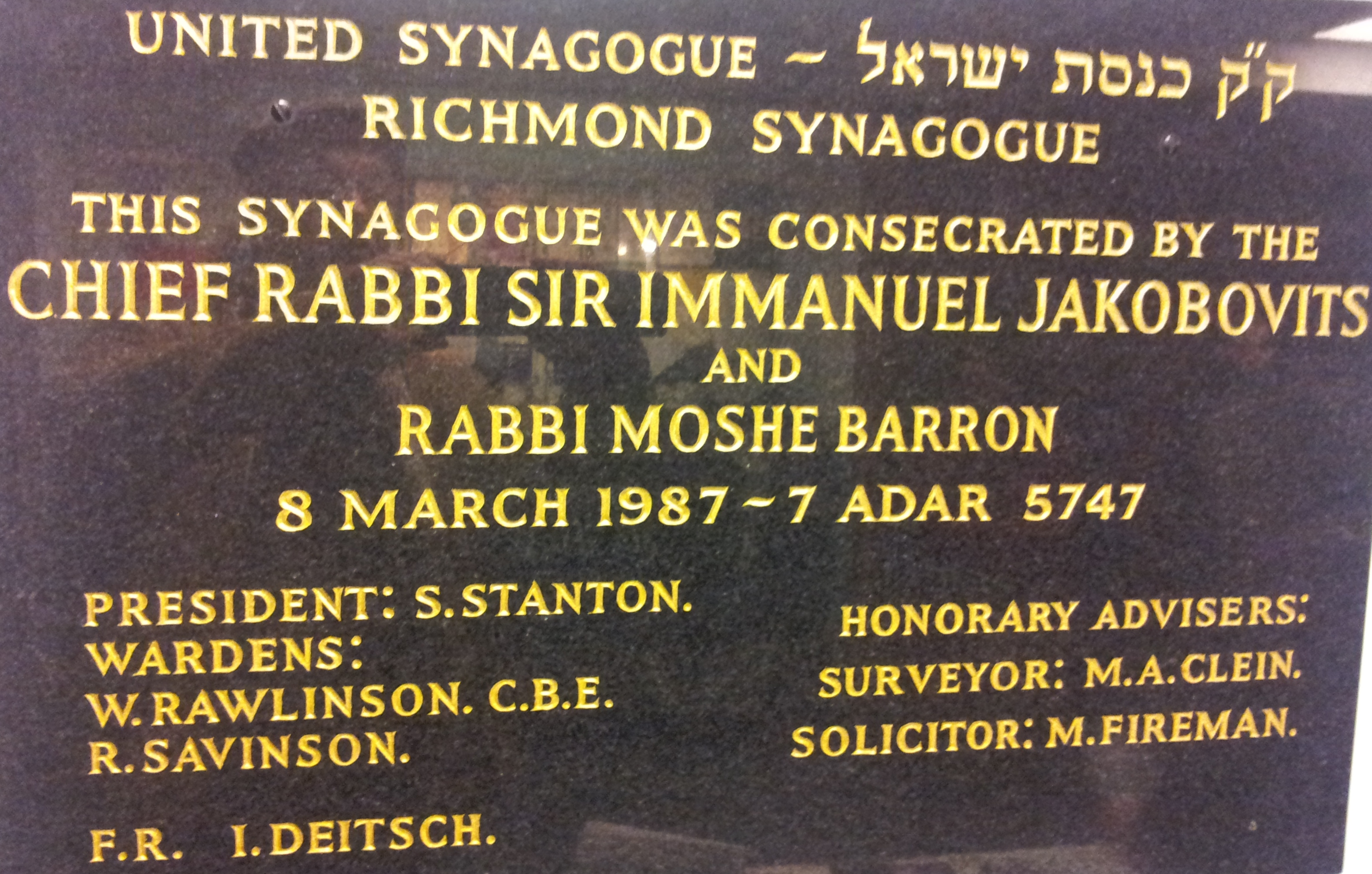
Plaque inside the synagogue, 1987

Richmond congregation logo

== See also ==
- History of the Jews in England
- List of Jewish communities in the United Kingdom
- List of synagogues in the United Kingdom
