= Matthew Brouillette =

American businessman and entrepreneur

Matthew J. Brouillette
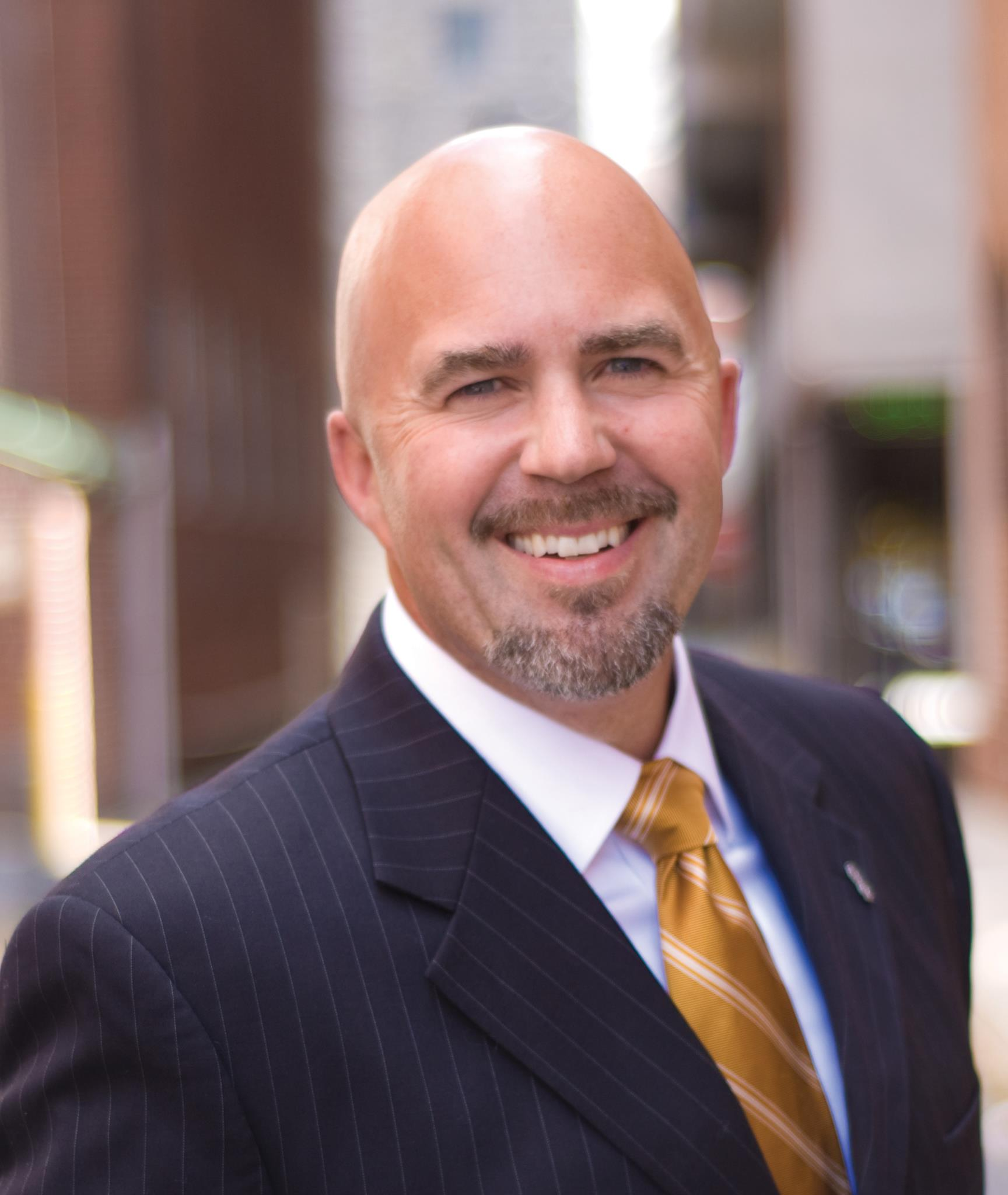
- Born: Matthew J. Brouillette; September 20, 1969 (age 56); Iowa City, Iowa

Matthew J. Brouillette (/briːˈjɛt/ bree-YET) is an American businessman and entrepreneur who is the founder and president of Commonwealth Partners Chamber of Entrepreneurs, a 501(c)(6) membership organization based in Harrisburg, Pennsylvania. He is the former president and CEO of the Commonwealth Foundation for Public Policy Alternatives, a free-market think tank in Pennsylvania. He served in that position from February 2002 through June 2016.

== Personal life ==
Brouillette was born on September 20, 1969, in Iowa City, Iowa. Prior to joining the Commonwealth Foundation, Brouillette spent seven years teaching history and coaching football and baseball at the high school and middle school levels. He is married and has four children.

== Education ==
Brouillette received his Bachelor of Arts (B.A.) degree in U.S. history and education from Cornell College and earned a master of education (M.Ed.) from Azusa Pacific University and a Master of Arts (M.A.) in history from the University of San Diego. He is ABD in his doctorate (Ph.D.) work in Public Policy and Administration from Walden University.

== Commonwealth Foundation ==
Brouillette was appointed president and CEO of the Commonwealth Foundation in February 2002 after spending the previous four years with the Mackinac Center for Public Policy.

In 2010, Politics Magazine named Brouillette as one of the top 50 Republican Influencers. The Pennsylvania Report named him to the 2009 "The Pennsylvania Report 100" list of influential figures in Pennsylvania politics and noted that his think tank "continues to expand its influence among Republicans in the state capital" and that a Republican victory in the 2010 gubernatorial election "will see his think tank’s ideas and opinion pieces turn into real policy."

== Other affiliations ==
His other affiliations include serving as a board member of the REACH Foundation, a Pennsylvania school choice advocacy organization, and the Joshua Group, a Harrisburg nonprofit ministry serving at-risk youth. Previously, he served on an advisory board for the Economics Department at Duquesne University, on an advisory council of the E. G. West Centre for Market Solutions in Education at the University of Newcastle upon Tyne in England, on an advisory committee for the New York City-based Atlantic Legal Foundation, and as an advisory board member for the American Academy for Liberal Education in Washington, D.C., a national organization dedicated to strengthening and promoting liberal education through accreditation and research.
