= Maurizio Giuliano =

Italian United Nations official, traveller, author and journalist

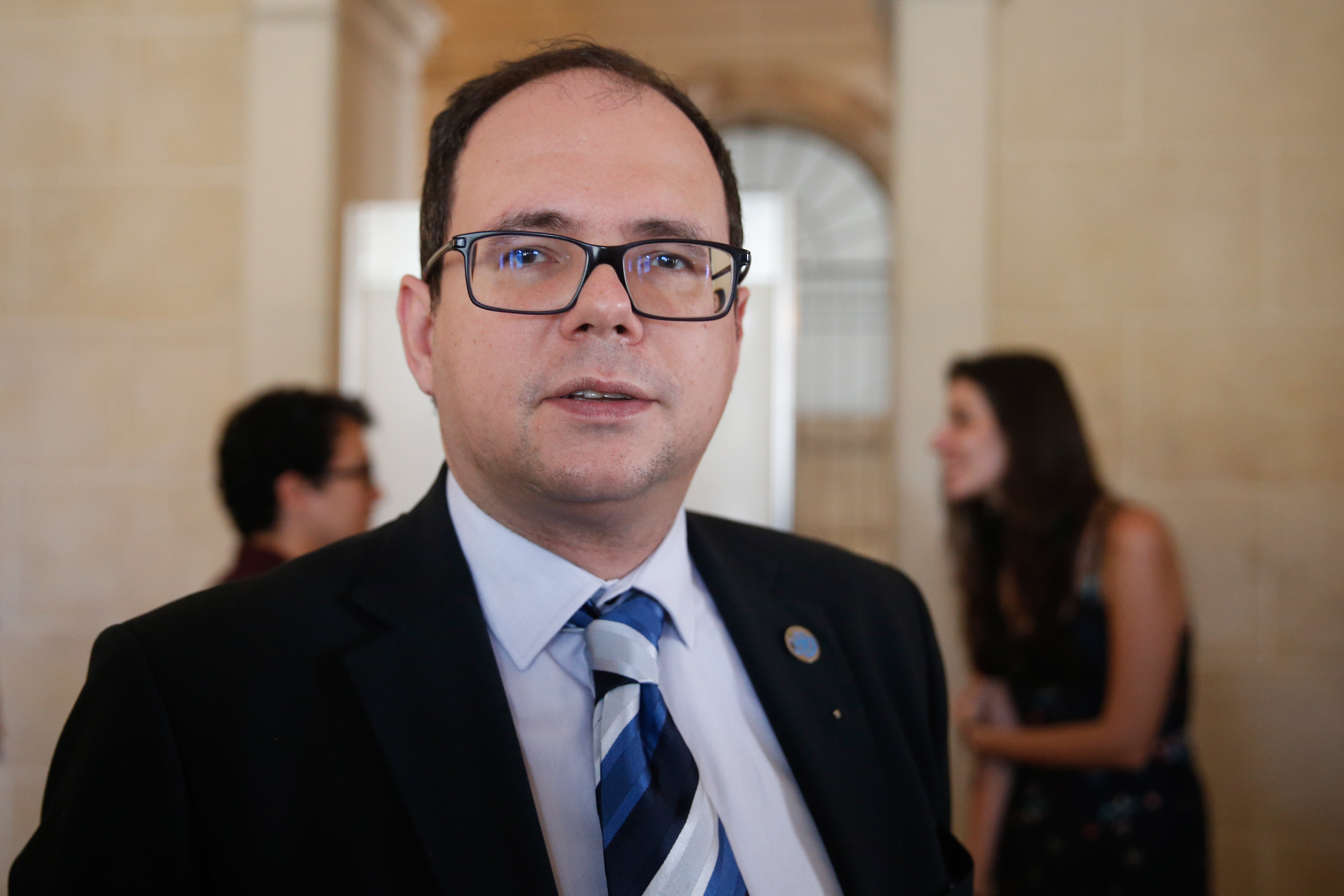
- Giuliano at a United Nations event
- Born: 1975 (age 50–51); Milan, Italy
- Education: University College, Oxford (BA); Fitzwilliam College, Cambridge (MA)
- Occupations: United Nations official, traveller, author, journalist
- Known for: Youngest person to visit every sovereign nation
- Awards: Guinness World Records (2004)
- Website: mauriziogiuliano.com

Maurizio Giuliano (born 1975) is an Italian-British United Nations official, traveller, author and journalist. As of 2004 he was, according to the Guinness Book of World Records, the youngest person to have visited all sovereign nations of the world (aged 28 years and 361 days). He has worked for various international organizations in the field of media relations.

== Personal life and education ==
Giuliano is the son of a lawyer father and a housewife mother. He has lived in Cuba, Chile and Indonesia.

After completing high school in Milan and in Manchester, he earned a degree from the University of Oxford in 1996, studying Philosophy, Politics, and Economics at University College, specialising in Latin America and eastern Europe. While at Oxford, he was a member of the Oxford University L'Chaim Society. He also earned a master's degree from the University of Cambridge in 1997.

As of 1998, he was a researcher at the Centre for Social Studies (CESOC) in Santiago, Chile.

== Writings ==
=== Academic work on Cuba ===
He authored two books and some academic articles on Cuban politics, focusing, among other things, on the US embargo, which he claimed (in the book "La Transición Cubana y el "Bloqueo" Norteamericano" and other works) has a strong counter-productive effect, in supporting the continuation of Cuba's regime. In the book and other writings, Giuliano staunchly contested the view that an end to the Castro regime would be near, and expressed the view that any transition would be slow and gradual.

In an article published in the British academic journal Democratization in 1998, he focused in particular on how the US embargo against Cuba helps create "empathy" by third parties towards Cuba, which is then domestically perceived as support towards Cuba's regime. He argued, hence, that the US Government - in addition to the embargo's direct influence on supporting Cuba's regime - indirectly inhibits potentially constructive pressures towards change, insofar as third countries, foreign non-governmental organizations and prominent individuals lend support to Cuba's resistance to the US embargo, and this offsets external pressures to democratize, thereby allowing the Cuban regime to convert such "empathy" into a source of legitimacy at home.

==== Purge of Havana's Centre for American Studies (CEA) ====
His scholarly work on internal Cuban politics, notably on the 1996 purge of Havana's Centre for American Studies (CEA) (contained in the book "El Caso CEA" published in 1998), has been the object of academic reviews, as it exposed the internal conflicts between Cuba's political apparatus and the country's intelligentsia, previously unknown. According to some reviews the book, a work of investigative journalism complemented by academic analysis, dealt a strong blow to hard-liners within the regime by exposing for the first time the internal conflicts between Cuba's apparatus and its intelligentsia. In 2001 Cuban exiled scholars Alberto Álvarez and Gerardo González, who were among those purged from the CEA, wrote the book "¿ Intelectuales vs. Revolución ? El caso del Centro de Estudios sobre América", which strongly built upon Giuliano's book to offer further insights on relations between Cuba's political apparatus and the country's intellectuals. Along with these two scholars and Giuliano, Cuban sociologist Haroldo Dilla Alfonso expressed the view that the purge mechanisms described in Giuliano's book have been a key pillar for the regime's ability to prevent the rise of reformers, and that such dynamics remain in place as late as 2016.

=== Journalism ===
Besides work on Cuba, other countries Giuliano covered in his journalistic work include East Timor and Myanmar (Burma). In 1993 he worked for the Austrian weekly magazine Profil, for which he interviewed Mikhail Gorbachev, who expressed criticism at the reforms carried out by Russian president Boris Yeltsin: when Yeltsin called a referendum for 25 April 1993 in an attempt to achieve even greater powers as president, Gorbachev told Giuliano that he would not vote and instead advocated for new presidential elections.

In 2000, he visited North Korea and published an essay about his visit, essentially describing his tour around the country as a mise en scène by the North Korean authorities.

In his journalistic work, he reportedly ran into problems with the authorities of at least two countries. On 16 August 1998 he was denied entry to Myanmar after making contact with the National League for Democracy and meeting its leader Aung San Suu Kyi, with Myanmar authorities accusing him of falsely claiming to be a tourist and of "illegally gathering news", which prompted condemnations by organizations such as the International Federation of Journalists and Reporters without Borders; only in 2013 Giuliano managed to return to Myanmar and also meet Suu Kyi. While on 30 October 2002, he was reportedly detained and manhandled by Israeli authorities while crossing the Allenby Bridge, which also prompted condemnation by Reporters without Borders. Giuliano however describes his worst authorities-related odyssey as he was travelling in 2003 around the South Pacific, where authorities in New Zealand and some South Pacific islands reportedly caused serious hindrance to his movements for the simple fact that he appeared to be suspicious because of his strange travel patterns.

Giuliano's writings have also included lighter topics. During his time in Kabul, for example, he wrote restaurant reviews for a local English-language magazine.

=== Political advocacy ===
In the early 2000s, Giuliano was a consultant for the Italian Senate's Committee on Human Rights. At that time, some his writings were intended to influence the positions of the Italian Government on certain human rights issues, as was the case with material that he wrote on North Korea.

== Development career ==
In 2004, Giuliano worked for the International Organization for Migration in the elections for Afghan refugees in Pakistan, where he advocated for turnout by potential voters in spite of precarious security conditions. And in 2005 he worked in Afghanistan for the United Nations Development Programme's justice division which endeavoured to reform the country's legal system. In both cases, he was working in the field of communications with the media.

He worked for the United Nations, again in the field of media relations, in Central African Republic in 2006, where he denounced very low levels of funding for a "neglected" emergency and called Western governments to be generous in saving lives of the most vulnerable Central Africans. He moved to Sudan in 2007, where he vocally denounced abuses by increasingly fragmented armed groups as well as access constraints caused by the Sudanese Government, and called for more funding also in response to floods that hit the city of Kassala. In 2008 he was posted to Chad, calling for more international attention amidst conflict between Chadian and pro-Sudanese forces which displaced more than half a million people, and with the events culminating in the battle of N'Djamena of February 2008, after which he worked in Cameroon following the refugee crisis caused by war and asking for solid international support for the refugees and for reconstruction efforts, warning that a humanitarian crisis could turn into a humanitarian catastrophe in the absence of a robust response.

In 2009 and 2010 he worked in the Democratic Republic of Congo, where he denounced attacks by warring parties against civilians and the use of rape as a weapon of war, referring to rape as a "pandemic" and "plague". He denounced the brutality of expulsions between the DRC and Angola, alleging that both countries were committing rapes of illegal immigrants who were being deported, and urging them to investigate the allegations on both sides of the border. In response to Giuliano's criticism about the extent of rape in the country, Congo's Government spokesperson Lambert Mende dubbed him as "the rape spokesperson".

In 2010 he was UN spokesperson for the 2010 Pakistan floods. He warned of an impending "second wave of death" that would result from post-flood disease and food shortages, stating that 3.5 million children were at risk of death if they did not get assistance, including due to cholera. He stated that "an already colossal disaster [was] getting worse and requiring an even more colossal response", referring to the relief operations as "a marathon at sprint pace", and giving figures of up to a million people displaced in 48 hours. He argued that the needs outpaced available resources, also due to endless rains. In response to Taliban threats to attack relief workers, Giuliano stated that they "would not be intimidated" by such threats and would continue working. He indicated that the floods had a worse impact than several other recent natural disasters combined, becoming the worst natural disaster in United Nations history. He attracted criticism for exaggerating the extent of the emergency but was also credited for bringing attention to it.

In 2014 and 2015 he headed the office of the United Nations Office for the Coordination of Humanitarian Affairs (OCHA) in the DRC's city of Bunia, where he denounced continued abuses by multiple militia groups against civilians, in particular the Front for Patriotic Resistance in Ituri (FRPI) and the Ugandan Allied Democratic Forces (ADF), as well as less known warlords including Paul Sadala (alias Morgan) whose routine use of gang-rape was denounced by Giuliano; but he also requested the Government and the UN mission MONUSCO to do more to protect civilians. He considered that serious atrocities and human rights abuses in Ituri were not getting sufficient international attention, and called for robust protection efforts and funding to meet humanitarian needs. He also advocated for reinforced accountability to recipients of assistance.

== Travel ==
According to the Guinness Book, through his work, he had travelled to every single sovereign country in the world (which totalled 193 according to the Guinness Book) by 20 February 2004. He claimed that he had visited a total of up to 238 territories (including the 193 sovereign countries recognized by Guinness), and stated that North Korea had been the hardest country to get into, after numerous attempts and long waits to get a visa, followed by a visit during which he was never let alone by his "tour guides". His Sudanese visa was also particularly difficult to obtain, involving a wait of nearly a year. In 1992 he had his passport stolen in Albania and reported difficulties obtaining a new one from the Italian embassy, supposedly due to a Neapolitan clerk mistaking him for an Albanian because of his Milanese accent.

He started travelling at the age of 14 and believes that, as of 2004, he had travelled at least two million miles, including on the Trans-Siberian Railway and through 11 round-the-world air journeys. Some of his earliest journeys were to Albania and Sierra Leone in 1991, aged 16, and to Mongolia in 1992 on the occasion of the national festivities Naadam. During his early travels he often stayed with penpals. Most of his later travels were related to his journalistic work. He stated that in some countries he lived or spent months, while in others he spent mere hours, his shortest stay being a one-hour visit to Tuvalu with Air Fiji.

On 20 February 2004, he arrived in Suriname on a Brazilian airliner, thereby completing his visit to all sovereign nations of the world. He held a press conference there on 24 February, where he stated that he had chosen Suriname to complete his record, as the country had always fascinated him due to its richness and variety in cultures and ethnicities. He then travelled from Suriname to London, with 42 passports (30 Italian and 12 British) filled with immigration stamps, in order to prove his record with Guinness World Records. He claimed that most of his travels were unrelated to the record, and that only since 2001, on the suggestion of friends, he had the Guinness Record in mind when planning his travels. In explaining his record, however, he stated that he might be affected by an "addiction to crossing borders".

Collecting passport stamps as proof of travel was a major part of Giuliano's endeavour, and he describes being obsessed with his stamps, to the extent that he travelled with ink pads in five different colours so that he could assist immigration officers whose stamps may lack ink.

== Bibliography ==
- (in Spanish) with foreword by José Antonio Viera-Gallo Quesney, La Transición Cubana y el 'Bloqueo' Norteamericano, Ediciones CESOC; 1st edition (May 1997), ISBN 956-211-062-1.
- (in Spanish) El Caso CEA: Intelectuales e Inquisidores en Cuba, Ediciones Universal; 2nd edition (November 1998), ISBN 0-89729-870-5.
- (in Portuguese) Ações e relações com a população civil em missões de paz in Missões de paz: Teoria e dimensão humana, Appris Ltda; 1st edition (January 2020), ISBN 978-65-5523-319-3.
- (in Portuguese) with foreword by Jean-Pierre Lacroix, O Brasil nas missões de paz depois da MINUSTAH: reflexões in 13 anos do Brasil na MINUSTAH: lições aprendidas e novas perspectivas, CIASC; 1st edition (January 2019), ISBN 978-65-80852-01-7.
- The United States' embargo and Cuba's foreign relations: missed opportunities for democratization in journal Democratization, Vol. 5, Issue 3, Autumn 1998, Taylor & Francis.
