= Edict of Compiègne =

1557 French decree adding the death penalty to the persecution of Protestants

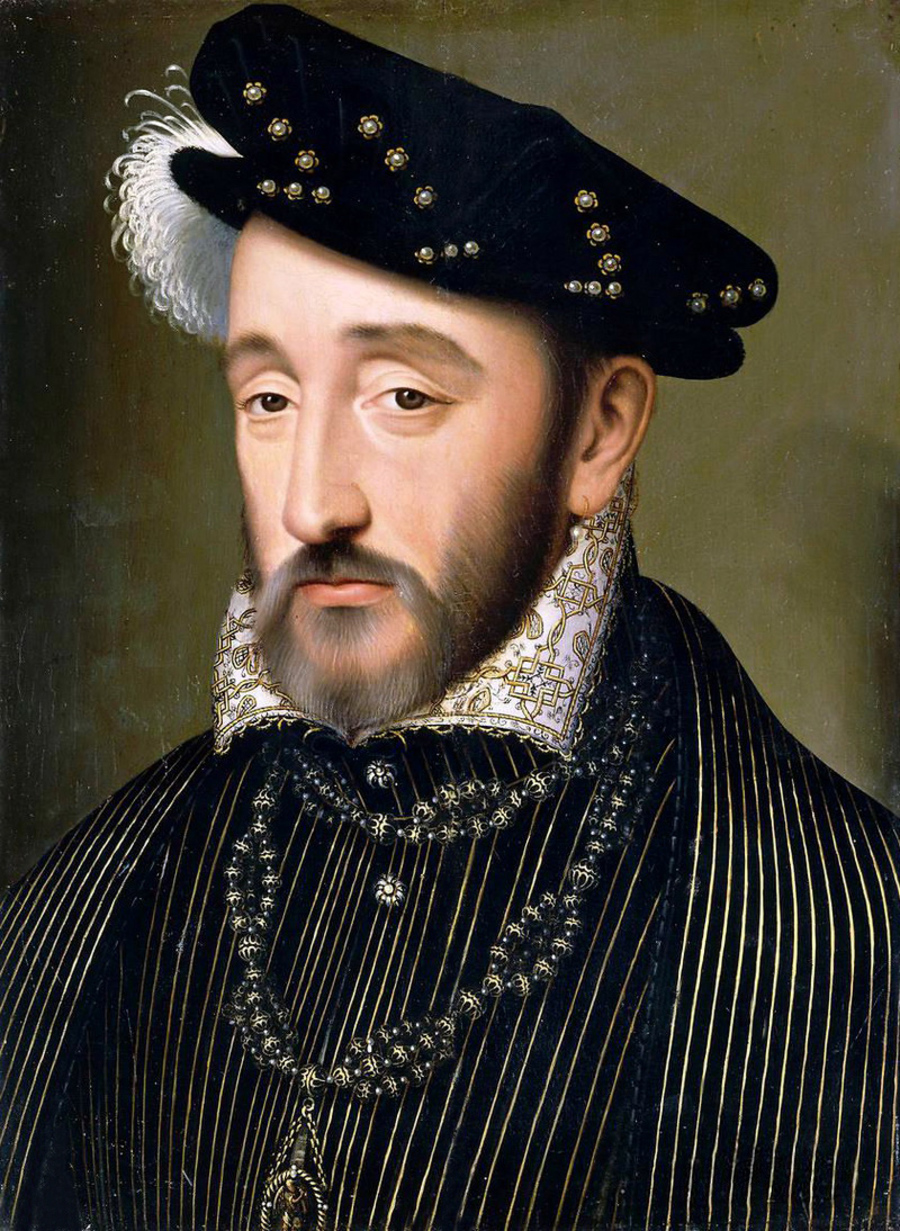
Henri II of France issued the Edict of Compiègne on 24 July 1557.

The Edict of Compiègne (French: Édit de Compiègne), issued from his Château de Compiègne by Henry II of France, 24 July 1557, applied the death penalty for all convictions of relapsed and obstinate "sacramentarians", for those who went to Geneva or published books there, for iconoclast blasphemers against images, and even for illegal preaching or participation in religious gatherings, whether public or private. It was the third in a series of increasingly severe punishments for expressions of Protestantism in France, which had for an aim the extirpation of the Reformation. By raising the stakes, which now literally became matters of life and death, the Edict had the result of precipitating the long religious crisis in France and hastening the onset of armed civil war between armies mustered on the basis of religion, the series of French Wars of Religion, which were not settled until Henri IV's edict of toleration, the Edict of Nantes (1598).

The source of the "contagion", as court pamphleteers put it, was Geneva, where the French-born John Calvin achieved undisputed religious supremacy in 1555, the same year that the French Reformed Church organized itself at a synod in Paris, not far from the royal residence at the Louvre. At the Peace of Augsburg signed that same year in Germany, the essential concept was cuius regio eius religio, "Whose region, his religion". In other words, the religion of the king or other ruler would be the religion of the people. The petty princes of Germany were enabled to dictate the religion of their subjects, and it came to be sensed as a mark of weakness that the King of France could not do so: "One King, One Faith" would become the rallying cry of the ultra-Catholic party of the Guise faction.

The Parlement of Paris was deeply divided on the issues. When the King approached the Parlement for its formal advice beforehand on the best means of punishing and stamping out heresy, the moderate voices of président Séguier and conseiller du Drac urged against the proposed new edict (as unnecessary) and specifically opposed the introduction of an Inquisition into France, an innovation that would appear to circumvent the king's justice, vested in the parlement.

The preamble of the Edict of Compiègne, like earlier ones, remarked on the ineffectiveness of the courts in acting against "heretics", because of the malice or lenience of judges. The Edict sanctioned a papal brief that established a court of Inquisition in France, though the Parlement delayed in acting upon it, and it was rescinded in April 1558. For now, it hesitated even to take up the edict: "On the last day of 1557, the gens du roi complained again that the court had still not deliberated the king's latest edict (Compiègne), "presented four months ago." They understated the case: the edict had been presented on 24 July 1557 and was registered in January 1558."

But the first effects of the Edict had already transpired. On 4 September 1557, an angry mob had broken into a Calvinist meeting being held in a private house in the rue Saint-Jacques. They found nobles and royal officials, respected artisans, women and children. About 132 people were arrested and thrown into prison. On 14 September, three, including a noble widow, were publicly burned in the place Maubert.

== See also ==
- Index Librorum Prohibitorum
