= Kosher Jesus =

2012 book by Shmuley Boteach

- First edition
- Author: Shmuley Boteach
- Language: English
- Subject: Religion
- Publisher: Gefen Publishing House
- Publication date: February 1, 2012
- Media type: Hardcover, eBook
- Pages: 300
- ISBN: 978-9652295781

Kosher Jesus (2012) is a book by the Orthodox Rabbi Shmuley Boteach, focusing on the relationship between Christianity and Judaism. The book examines the rabbinic origins of the teachings of Jesus within the context of Second Temple Judaism in the 1st century and the New Testament, and compares scholarly views on the historical figure of Jesus with the theological ideals expressed by the Jewish writers of early rabbinic literature.

The book argues that Jesus was a wise and learned Torah-observant Jewish rabbi. It says he was a beloved member of the Jewish community. At the same time, Jesus is said to have despised the Romans for their cruelty, and fought them courageously. The book states that the Jews had nothing whatsoever to do with the murder of Jesus, but rather that blame for his trial and killing lies with the Romans and Pontius Pilate. Boteach states clearly that he does not believe in Jesus as the Jewish Messiah. At the same time, Boteach argues that "Jews have much to learn from Jesus – and from Christianity as a whole – without accepting Jesus' divinity. There are many reasons for accepting Jesus as a man of great wisdom, beautiful ethical teachings, and profound Jewish patriotism." He concludes by writing, as to Judeo-Christian values, that "the hyphen between Jewish and Christian values is Jesus himself."

== Background ==
Kosher Jesus is a book by the author and Orthodox Rabbi Shmuley Boteach, published in 2012 by Gefen Publishing House. Boteach had authored over two dozen books, including Kosher Sex and The Michael Jackson Tapes, and had hosted the reality TV show Shalom in the Home. As background to the subject of the book, nearly a century earlier, in December 1925, Reform Rabbi Stephen S. Wise had delivered a sermon about Jesus the Jew, causing an uproar culminating in an edict of condemnation against him by the Agudath Harabonim (Union of Orthodox Rabbis).

Boteach had an encounter with a Christian evangelist, which he noted was an important event that led him to write the book:

"It started when I was a young student rabbi on campus giving out Purim presents to students, when this 30-year-old guy came over smiling, and drew a crowd as he made a scene about his joy for Purim. Then he subtly took out his New Testament and Hebrew Bible, and confronted me about why I didn’t believe in Jesus. He was a Christian missionary, and in front of all these students he told me I would burn in hell without Jesus. I was gob smacked at my inability to respond. From that day I started reading the New Testament and memorizing large portions of it, as well as of the Hebrew Bible."

== Content ==
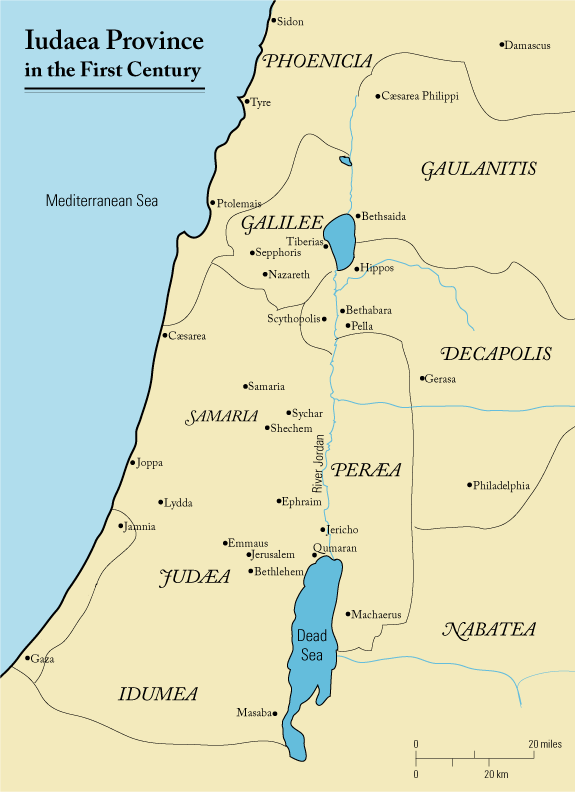
Judea Province during the 1st century

Kosher Jesus focuses on the relationship between Christianity and Judaism.

In his introduction to Kosher Jesus, Boteach sets forth his argument that Jesus was "a wise and learned rabbi who despised the Romans for their cruelty, ... who fought the Romans courageously and was ultimately murdered for trying to throw off the Roman yoke of oppression ... who worked to rekindle Jewish ritual observance of every aspect of the Torah and to counter the brutal Roman occupation of his people's land."

Boteach said that the book "traces the teachings of Jesus to their original sources: the Torah, the Talmud, and rabbinic literature". In addition to examining the origins of the teachings of Jesus within the context of Second Temple Judaism in the 1st century, and their rabbinic origins, Kosher Jesus takes an intensive look at the New Testament, and also compares scholarly views on the historical figure of Jesus, with the theological ideals expressed by the Jewish writers of early rabbinic literature.

Kosher Jesus expresses the belief that Jesus was a wise and learned Torah-observant Jew, and a beloved member of the Jewish community. It says that while Jesus was a courageous patriot who did rebel against Roman brutality, he did not rebel against Jewish law.

As to his killing, Boteach writes that the Jews had nothing whatsoever to do with the murder of Jesus. Rather, blame for his trial and killing lies with the Romans and Pontius Pilate, the Roman governor of Judea, who saw Jesus as a dangerous rebel.

Boteach states clearly that he does not believe in Jesus as the Jewish Messiah. He also asserts that Jesus never claimed personal divinity, or any status as the Jewish Messiah. At the same time, Boteach argues that "Jews have much to learn from Jesus - and from Christianity as a whole - without accepting Jesus' divinity. There are many reasons for accepting Jesus as a man of great wisdom, beautiful ethical teachings, and profound Jewish patriotism." He expresses the hope that a new look at Jesus as a man who lived and died as an observant Jew will help eliminate anti-Semitism, establish good will between the faiths, and “strengthen Judeo-Christian values.” He concludes by writing, as to Judeo-Christian values, that "the hyphen between Jewish and Christian values is Jesus himself."

Boteach draws on past work by Hyam Maccoby, a British Jewish scholar who wrote on the topic of Judaism and Christianity. Maccoby espoused the view that Paul the Apostle was the true founder of Christianity, while Jesus was a mainstream Jewish teacher of the first century whose teachings were later distorted to form the basis of a mythic tradition.

== Reception ==
Following its release, Kosher Jesus received mixed reactions from rabbis and other leaders in the Jewish community, as well as from Christian and secular reviewers. The Times of London ran an article on its reception, entitled: "Unholy row as orthodox rabbi dares to speak the J word".

A review in Publishers Weekly described the book as an "informed and cogent primer on Jesus of Nazareth" that "will certainly reopen intrafaith and interfaith dialogue." Reviewing the book for The Virginian-Pilot, Rabbi Israel Zoberman wrote that Boteach "offers a well-written scholarly volume that is far from dry and is accessible to all, one that both honors and is critical of [Christians and Jews]."

Rabbi Michael Leo Samuel, reviewing the book in the San Diego Jewish World, while noting what Boteach could have added to his book to deepen it, concluded that it was a bold book and that he admired the courage of a Hassidic rabbi wishing: "to talk about Jesus in a manner that is respectful and kind. This is quite a rarity—especially when you consider the animus that most Hassidic and Haredi Jews feel toward Jesus.... All in all I admire his ... willingness to talk about a subject that has remained a forbidden topic of discussion in Jewish circles of all denominations... one can argue that Shmuley’s Kosher Jesus should serve as a meaningful first step for many Jews wishing to promote a more truthful and meaningful dialogue with the Christian community."

Reviewer Jeremy Rosen of The Algemeiner Journal opined that Boteach "wants Christians to understand Jesus was not God but a nice loyal Jewish boy... And he wants Jews to stop thinking of him as a heretic and the founder of a religion that persecuted them for two thousand years." Rosen goes on to compare Kosher Jesus to Sigmund Freud's book Moses and Monotheism, a work which espouses the idea that Moses was an Egyptian, a theory that is generally regarded by mainstream historians as lacking in historical basis. He questions some of Boteach's assertions, but concludes his review by writing: "like all his books, it’s a fun romp and it makes you think and examine your own ideas. And that, after all, is what any good teacher really wants.".

Paul de Vries, a board member of the National Association of Evangelicals, while agreeing with Boteach on some points and disagreeing with him on others, wrote in the Christian Post: "Thank you, Rabbi Boteach, for introducing the vibrant, kosher Jesus once more."

However, Jacob Immanuel Schochet, a Canadian rabbi of the Orthodox Chabad-Lubavitch movement, was fiercely critical, deeming the book to be heretical and stating that it "poses a tremendous risk to the Jewish community," and that "it is forbidden for anyone to buy or read this book," and it "does more to enhance the evangelical missionary message" than any other book. A Chicago Chabad rabbi—who admitted that he had only read the title of the book—wrote an op-ed in which he asserted on that basis alone that the book was apikorus (heresy) and must be treated as such. On the other hand, Australian Orthodox Chabad Rabbi Moshe Gutnick, while agreeing with some of what Boteach said and disagreeing with other points, wrote: "The suggestion that [Boteach] is a heretic is simply ludicrous". Rabbi Michael Samuel of Temple Beth Sholom in Chula Vista, California, opined: "Lubavitchers do not want to know anything about Jesus." Boteach, for his part, said: "We are the People of the Book. We aren’t the people who ban books."

Tovia Singer, a Rabbi who authored books engaging with the New Testament, expressed his view that Boteach's entire book is meritless.

== See also ==
- Judaism's view of Jesus
