= National Fatherhood Initiative =

Non-profit organization

- Founded: March 7, 1994; 32 years ago
- Founder: Don Eberly
- Location: Germantown, Maryland, United States
- Key people: Christopher A. Brown; President
- Website: fatherhood.org

The National Fatherhood Initiative (NFI) is an American non-profit, non-partisan, non-sectarian organization that aims to improve the well-being of children through the promotion of responsible fatherhood.

== History ==
The National Fatherhood Initiative was founded on March 7, 1994, by Don Eberly, a civil society scholar.

== Description ==
Headquartered in Germantown, Maryland, United States, the mission of the NFI is to improve the well-being of children by increasing the proportion of children with involved, responsible, and committed fathers.

Its three-fold mission is to educate and inspire all Americans, equip organizations and fathers in six different sectors, and engage all sectors of society to address this issue. The three target sectors of its equipping strategy are military, corrections, and community-based organizations. The organization also produced and disseminated a national public service advertising campaign, in partnership with the Ad Council. The campaign included print, television, radio, internet, and outdoor ads.

Although the size of NFI's staff has decreased over the last years, the organization remains by some measures the largest provider of fatherhood resources and training in the nation. It offers more than 100 resources in its online store and print catalog, as well as numerous free online and downloadable resources for dads and practitioners. Since 2004, NFI has distributed more than 6.9 million fatherhood resources. Since 2002, NFI has trained over 18,000 practitioners from more than 6,300 organizations on how to deliver fatherhood programming to dads via webinar. These programs include 24/7 Dad, the most widely used fatherhood curriculum in the country, and InsideOut Dad, the only evidence-based program designed specifically for incarcerated fathers.

Andy Schoka, currently with Acumen Solutions, is the board chairman, and Christopher A. Brown is the organization's president after serving as executive vice president for three years.

== Awards scheme ==
Among the awards that the organization has given are awards to race car driver Dale Jarrett (in 2003), singer Kenny Chesney (in 2004), singer Buddy Jewell (in 2005), Rabbi Shmuley Boteach (in 2007), basketball player Dwyane Wade (in 2011), mayor Michael Bloomberg (in 2012), and film director Andy Fickman (in 2013).
