= Cliff Dorfman =

American screenwriter, film director and actor

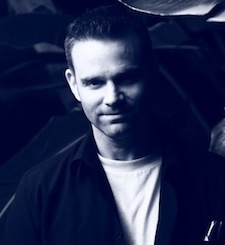
- Born: April 14, 1968 (age 58)
- Occupations: Screenwriter, director, actor
- Known for: Entourage and Warrior

Cliff Dorfman (born April 14, 1968) is an American screenwriter, film director and actor best known for his work on HBO's Entourage and the 2011 feature film Warrior. Dorfman's career began in the 1990s with recurring roles on 7th Heaven and Beverly Hills 90210. He also worked as a Hollywood club promoter, appearing in the documentary film Hollywood: Wild in the Streets and in Bret Easton Ellis' 1999 novel Glamorama, in which Dorfman is named as a friend of actor Corey Feldman.

As a screenwriter for Entourage, Dorfman wrote the 2005 episode "My Maserati Does 185". An earlier script written by Dorfman, Five Towns, became the basis for Johnny Drama's fictional TV show of the same name. In 2007, Dorfman co-wrote a comic for DC Comics called The Watchdogs and the Sega video game Full Auto 2: Battlelines. In addition, he consulted on EA Games' Dead Space and wrote a column on 18-year-old model Laura la Rue for Los Angeles Confidential magazine, "Cliff's Notes."

Dorfman made his feature directorial debut with the 2011 crime thriller Criminal Empire for Dummy's which was never released. He is also a co-writer of the 2011 mixed martial arts action film Warrior and an instructor with the UCLA Extension Writers' Program. In September 2011, Dorfman signed with Apostle Management. He is also represented by Paradigm Talent Agency and law firm Gang Tyre Ramer & Brown.

== Filmography as writer ==
- Warrior (2011)
- Criminal Empire for Dummy's (2011)
- Shoot (2006)
- Entourage (2005)
