= Commonwealth Foundation for Public Policy Alternatives =

American think tank

Coordinates: 40.2634°N 76.8856°W

Commonwealth Foundation
- Formation: 1987
- Type: Public policy think tank
- Tax ID no.: 23-2473845
- Location(s): 225 State Street; Harrisburg, Pennsylvania, U.S.
- Region served: Pennsylvania
- President: Andrew Lewis
- Chairman: George Coates
- Board of directors: Gerard Alexander; Monty Brown; Thomas Beach; Bruce Kern; George Coates Jr.; Emily Cox; Sally Simkiss; Bill Sordoni
- Revenue: $12 million (2025)
- Expenses: $8.87 million (2025)
- Staff: 26 (2023)
- Website: www.commonwealthfoundation.org

The Commonwealth Foundation for Public Policy Alternatives is a think tank based in Harrisburg, Pennsylvania. It develops and advances fiscally conservative and libertarian public policies. The organization's stated mission is to "transform free-market ideas into public policies so all Pennsylvanians can flourish." Its policy agenda is focused on "educational opportunity, public-sector labor reform, fiscal responsibility, and improving Pennsylvania's overall economic climate."

In 2024, the National Review described the organization as "a policy juggernaut considered one of the most successful and impactful of America's state-based, pro-liberty, free-market think tanks."

== History ==
The Commonwealth Foundation was founded in 1987 by Don Eberly. Matthew Brouillette was hired as the organization's president in February 2002. At the time, the organization had three employees and $350,000 in annual revenue. In April 2016, Brouillette announced he was stepping down from his position. During his tenure, the organization grew to have 18 employees and an annual budget of more than $4 million with offices in Harrisburg and King of Prussia. Charles Mitchell replaced Brouillette as the organization's president and CEO. In 2024, Andrew Lewis was named as president and CEO of the organization.

Jane Leader Janeczek, a registered Democrat and the daughter of former Pennsylvania Democratic Governor George M. Leader, became the Commonwealth Foundation's board chair in 2016. She became involved with the Commonwealth Foundation due to the organization's work on prison reform. In a column announcing her election as the organization's chairwoman, she wrote: "As my father and I — both lifelong Democrats — became more familiar with the work of the Commonwealth Foundation, we found not one policy proposal with which we disagreed. Whether prison reform to fix an ailing system, pension reform to put our state on solid financial footing, or paycheck protection to respect the use of taxpayer dollars, the Commonwealth Foundation's proposals represent common-sense policies."

In 2017, George G. H. Coates Jr. was elected as board chair. Coates is an alcohol industry executive who also serves on the boards of the Chestnut Hill Conservancy, Americans for Fair Treatment, and Donors Trust.

== Activities ==
Commonwealth is active in policy areas such as criminal justice reform, school choice, and the Pennsylvania state budget. Commonwealth supports comprehensive criminal justice reforms focusing state resources on violent offenders and helping non-violent offenders who have served their sentences to reintegrate into society. The Commonwealth Foundation is a frequent commentator on public school reform; advocating for school choice through increased charter schools and tax credits for scholarships.

The group "advocates for small government and market-based solutions" such as supporting the privatization of Pennsylvania's state-run liquor stores. The organization also supported former Democratic Governor Ed Rendell's proposal to privatize or lease the Pennsylvania Turnpike Commission. The group was nominated for the Atlas Network's Templeton Freedom Award for its work in support of pension reform in the state. The organization supported two ballot measures to amend the Pennsylvania Constitution to limit the governor's emergency powers. A guest commentary in The Patriot News criticized the group's tactics in supporting the ballot initiatives.
