= Shalom in the Home =

American reality television series (2006–2007)

- Genre: Reality
- Written by: Bernadette McDaid
- Directed by: Marcus Boyle; Beth Paholak
- Presented by: Rabbi Shmuley Boteach
- Composers: Matt Anthony; Stephen O'Reilly
- Country of origin: United States
- Original language: English
- No. of seasons: 2
- No. of episodes: 20

Production
- Executive producers: Roy Ackerman; Andrew Harrison; Ronnie Krensel; Deborah Adler Myers; Jamie Schutz
- Producer: Consuelo Villanueva
- Cinematography: Dominic Azoto
- Camera setup: Single-camera
- Running time: 45–48 minutes
- Production company: Diverse USA

Original release
- Network: TLC
- Release: April 10, 2006 – May 7, 2007

Shalom in the Home is an American reality television series that aired on TLC for two seasons from April 10, 2006, to May 7, 2007. It was hosted by Orthodox Rabbi Shmuley Boteach on Mondays at 9 p.m. In the show, Boteach counselled dysfunctional families. It was one of the cable network's highest-rated shows and was the first reality TV show to have a rabbi as its star. National Fatherhood Initiative gave Boteach its most prestigious award for the series.

== Show format ==
The show debuted on April 10, 2006. A second and final season of Shalom in the Home began on March 4, 2007.

The weekly one-hour prime-time program sought to help families overcome difficult problems. Boteach provided advice to dysfunctional families about relationships, marriage and parenting and tried to bring them peace (shalom, in Hebrew). In each episode he worked with one family for ten days, playing the role of family therapist to help them come to terms with their problems and find the skills they need to improve.

After Boteach drove up to and parked in front of each troubled family's home in an Airstream trailer equipped with television monitors (the "Shalom Mobile Home"), cameras were installed in the family's home—capturing footage of the family's dynamics. Boteach later brought the parents into the trailer, which is "neutral territory", showed them the footage, and gently confronted them about the family's dysfunction in the hope of shocking them into change. Other techniques he used included, having family members wear earpieces so that Boteach could encourage positive, healthy interactions and discourage negative, dysfunctional behaviors and taking the family on an outdoors outing or activity.

Among the families that he counseled was one with parents who divorced because of the father's infidelity, families who have children who are fighting, a lesbian couple, a widow, two previously divorced parents jointly raising children from their first marriages, and a Muslim family in which the parents’ busy lives drained romance from their relationship. While Boteach used wisdom he learned from Judaism, he does not refer to Judaism and the show is not about religion.

Boteach appeared with families from Shalom in the Home on The Oprah Winfrey Show to discuss common family problems and how to solve them. He also followed the series with a book in 2007 by the same name. After the series ended, Boteach remained in contact with the families, counselling them and having them over to his home.

== Episodes ==
Season	Episodes	Originally released	
Season	Episodes	First released	Last released
1	10	April 10, 2006	June 12, 2006
2	10	March 4, 2007	May 7, 2007

== Reception ==
Shalom in the Home attracted almost 700,000 viewers per episode, and was one of the cable network's highest-rated shows. It was the first reality TV show to have a rabbi as its star. Common Sense Media gave it a rating of four stars out of five. In 2007, Boteach received the most prestigious award of the National Fatherhood Initiative for the show.

Rabbi Irwin Kula of the National Jewish Center for Learning and Leadership, a Jewish think tank said: "He’s trying to take an ancient tradition that has been familial, tribal, and inwardly focused, and translate it into an American idiom so it can benefit the larger society. He’s essentially bringing the Torah to the marketplace of ideas, and there are very few people doing this." The publication J. The Jewish News of Northern California wrote that unlike hosts in similar shows, Boteach: "really seems to care more about helping people than demeaning them."
