= Yitzchak Schochet =

Yitzchak Schochet is an English Orthodox rabbi. He was born in Canada, was educated in Toronto, London and New York, and received semikhah in 1988. In 1994, he received a Master of Arts in Jewish philosophy. He served Rabbi of Richmond Synagogue from 1991 until 1993, after which he became the rabbi of the Mill Hill Synagogue. He declined to apply for the position of Chief Rabbi of the United Hebrew Congregations of the Commonwealth, saying that his application would be overlooked since he is a Chabad follower.
