= List of presidents of Southern Utah University =

The following people have served as presidents of Southern Utah University throughout its history, including under its previous names of Branch Normal School, Branch Agricultural College, College of Southern Utah and Southern Utah State College.

- Milton Bennion (1897 – 1900)
- J. Reuben Clark (1900 – 1901)
- Nathan T. Porter (1901 – 1904)
- George W. Decker (1904 – 1913)
- Roy F. Homer (1913 – 1921)
- Peter V. Cardon (1921 – 1922)
- J. Howard Maughan (1922 – 1929)
- Henry Oberhansley (1929 – 1945)
- H. Wayne Driggs (1945 – 1951)
- Daryl Chase (1951 – 1954)
- Royden C. Braithwaite (1955 – 1978)
- Orville D. Carnahan (1978 – 1981)
- Gerald R. Sherratt (1982 – 1997)
- Steven D. Bennion (1997 – 2006)
- Michael T. Benson (2006 – 2013)
- Scott L. Wyatt (2013 – 2021)
- Mindy Benson (2021–Present)

== Sources ==
About Southern Utah University
