= Linnie Findlay =

American writer

Linnie Taylor Marchant Findlay (April 22, 1919 – January 10, 2009) was a writer-historian based in Ephraim, Utah. A native of Ioka, Utah, she is cited as a founding editor of the Saga of the Sanpitch, an annually-published collection of historical short-stories about Scandinavian immigrants and their descendants in Utah's Sanpete Valley. She and her husband, a professor at Snow College, were among the original organizers of the Mormon Miracle Pageant. Findlay was a Latter Day Saint.

== Publications ==
- Findlay, Linnie (1964). "Why?". The Relief Society Magazine (51): 734.
- Findlay, Linnie; Madsen, Eleanor P.; Nielson, Virginia (1999). History of the Relief Society in Ephraim, 1856-1999. Ephraim, Utah: Ephraim Stake Relief Society. OCLC 82898733.
- Findlay, Linnie; Madsen, Eleanor P.; Nielson, Virginia (1990). Ephraim Utah Stake : A brief history of the religious background of Ephraim and its people since its early settlement, 1854-1989. Ephraim, Utah: Ephraim Stake Relief Society. OCLC 80530290.
