= List of leaders of Coastal Carolina University =

President of Coastal Carolina University
- Incumbent; James J. Winebrake since 2025
- Appointer: Coastal Carolina University Board of Governors
- Formation: 1954 (director); 1963 (chancellor); 1993 (president)
- First holder: Edward J. Woodhouse (director); Edward M. Singleton (chancellor); Ronald R. Ingle (president)
- Website: Office of the President

This list of leaders of Coastal Carolina University includes all who have served as directors, chancellor, or presidents of Coastal Carolina University since its founding in 1954.

== Coastal Carolina Junior College (1954–1960) ==
=== Directors ===
- Edward J. Woodhouse, 1954–1955
- George C. Rogers, 1955–1961

== University of South Carolina Coastal Carolina College (1960–1993) ==
=== Directors ===
- William C. Casper, 1961–1963

=== Chancellors ===
- Edward M. Singleton, 1963–1983
- Fredrick W. Hicks III, 1983–1985
- Ronald G. Eaglin, 1985–1992
- Ronald R. Ingle, 1992–1993

== Coastal Carolina University (1993-present) ==
=== Presidents ===
- Ronald R. Ingle, 1993–2007
- David A. DeCenzo, 2007–2020
- Michael T. Benson, 2021–2025
- James J. Winebrake, 2025–present
