= Brad Cook =

American historian and academic administrator

Bradley J. Cook

President of the American University of Bahrain
- In office July 2022 – July 2025
- Preceded by: Susan Saxton
- Succeeded by: Dr. Wafa Almansoori

17th President of Snow College
- In office 2019–2022

Executive Vice President and Provost at Southern Utah University
- In office 2009–2019

President of the Abu Dhabi Women's College
- In office 2006–2009

Personal details
- Born: Bradley James Cook Ogden, Utah, U.S.
- Education: Stanford University (BA, MA); University of Oxford (DPhil)

Bradley J. Cook (born October 19, 1964) is an American historian and former academic administrator who served as president of the American University of Bahrain. He previously served as the 17th president of Snow College in Ephraim, Utah. He has also held roles as provost of Southern Utah University, president of the Abu Dhabi Women's College in the UAE, and VP for Academic Affairs at Utah Valley University.

== Early life and education ==
Cook is a Utah native but as teenager lived in Saudi Arabia where his parents were educators for an international school system. He eventually graduated from Payson High School where he was a stand-out athlete in football, basketball, and track. He earned a Bachelor of Arts in international relations and a Master of Arts in the social science of education from Stanford University. He attended Stanford on a full-ride athletic scholarship where he was a starting cornerback on the football team earning him First-Team Academic All PAC-10 honors.

His first job was at the American University in Cairo as the Special Assistant to the President

He later earned a Doctor of Philosophy in Middle East studies from the University of Oxford.

== Career ==
From 1999 to 2006, Cook was the vice president of Utah Valley University for academic affairs. From 2006 to 2009, he was the president of the Abu Dhabi Women's College. From 2009 to 2019, he was the executive vice president and provost of Southern Utah University. He became the 17th president of Snow College in May 2019. He served as president of the American University of Bahrain from July 2022 to July 2025, succeeded by Dr Wafa Almansoori.
