= David A. DeCenzo =

2nd President of Coastal Carolina University
- In office 2007–2020
- Preceded by: Ronald R. Ingle
- Succeeded by: Michael T. Benson

Personal details
- Born: February 21, 1955 (age 71)
- Spouse: Terri DeCenzo
- Education: University of Maryland, College Park (B.A.); West Virginia University (M.S.); West Virginia University (Ph.D.)
- Profession: Academic administrator

David A. DeCenzo (born February 21, 1955) is the former eighth chief executive, and second president of Coastal Carolina University from 2007 to 2020. He was a graduate of the University of Maryland and West Virginia University.

DeCenzo is also a member of Coastal Carolina's athletics hall of fame. He is a 2022 inductee to the Sasser Hall of Fame as a non-student athlete inductee. This was to honor his leadership in navigating the university during his time as president. Dr. DeCenzo was also honored in 2021, a year after his retirement from the university, with the formal naming of a new residence hall in his honor, Teal Hall was renamed DeCenzo Hall.

== See also ==
- List of leaders of Coastal Carolina University
