= James J. Winebrake =

American academic

4th President of Coastal Carolina University
- Incumbent
- Assumed office July 7, 2025
- Preceded by: Michael T. Benson

Personal details
- Spouse: Susan Winebrake
- Children: 4
- Education: Lafayette College (B.S.); Massachusetts Institute of Technology (M.S.); University of Pennsylvania (Ph.D.)
- Profession: Academic administrator

James J. Winebrake is an American academic administrator serving as the fourth and current president of Coastal Carolina University. He is a graduate of the University of Pennsylvania and the Massachusetts Institute of Technology (MIT).

== Career ==
Winebrake graduated from Lafayette College (1985–1989) with a Bachelor of Science in physics, MIT (1989–1991) with a Master of Science degree in technology and policy, and from the University of Pennsylvania (1991–1994) with a Ph.D. in energy management and policy. Prior to being an academic administrator, he served as an associate professor of public policy at James Madison University from 1995 to 2002, a professor and chairman of the department of science, technology, and society at the Rochester Institute of Technology from 2002 to 2011, and a scientist for the U.S Department of Energy from 1993 to 1995. He previously served as the provost of the University of North Carolina Wilmington from July 2020 to June 2025.

On June 5, 2025, it was announced that Winebrake would be succeeding Michael T. Benson as president of Coastal Carolina University beginning on July 7, 2025. He was chosen from 205 applicants.

== Published works ==
- Dynamic Modeling of Environmental Systems. Springer Publishing. 2000. ISBN 978-0387988801. (with Michael L. Deaton)
- Alternate Energy. Taylor & Francis. 2004. ISBN 978-0824742898.

== See also ==
- List of leaders of Coastal Carolina University
