= Snow College =

Community college in Ephraim, Utah, US

- Former names: Sanpete Stake Academy (1888–1900); Snow Academy (1900–1917); Snow Normal College (1917–1922); Snow Junior College (1922)
- Type: Public community college
- Established: 1888; 138 years ago
- Parent institution: Utah System of Higher Education
- Accreditation: NWCCU
- Affiliations: NJCAA; Scenic West Athletic Conference
- Endowment: $30.1 million (2025)
- President: Stacee Yardley McIff
- Faculty: 115 faculty and 144 staff
- Students: 5,506 (Fall 2023)
- Location: Ephraim, Utah, U.S. 39°21′40″N 111°34′59″W
- Campus: Rural, 82 acres (33 ha)
- Colors: Blue, white, and orange
- Mascot: Badger
- Website: www.snow.edu

Snow College is a public community college in Ephraim, Utah. It offers certificates and associate degrees along with bachelor's degrees in music, software engineering, and nursing. Snow College is part of the Utah System of Higher Education.

== History ==
Founded in 1888 by local citizens as Sanpete Stake Academy, the school was later renamed Snow Academy to honor Lorenzo Snow and Erastus Snow, distant cousins who were leaders in the Church of Jesus Christ of Latter-day Saints (LDS Church). Classes were first held in the upper story of the Ephraim Co-op building. When it came time for the school to construct its own building, it was funded by local donations, including "Sunday Eggs" (the proceeds from the sales of all eggs laid on Sunday). Like other academies in the LDS Church's system, it was originally a secondary school. As the institution grew, it began to offer college-level courses. In 1917, the academy era ended and the school became Snow Normal College. In 1922, officials renamed the school Snow Junior College only to change it one year later to Snow College. The college was transferred from the Church of Jesus Christ of Latter-day Saints to the state of Utah in 1931. It is one of the oldest junior colleges west of the Mississippi.

The Utah State Board of Regents granted permission in 2016 for Snow College to offer a bachelor's degree in software engineering. Snow College, as of 2018–2019, offers bachelor's degrees in commercial music and software engineering.

=== Richfield campus ===
In addition to the main 82-acre (33 ha) Ephraim campus, Snow College maintains the 56-acre (23 ha) Snow College Richfield Campus in Richfield, Utah. The Richfield campus was originally opened in 1977 to house the Sevier Valley Tech Area Vocational Center (a part of the state's technical school system). In 1998, the Utah State Legislature established "Snow College South," a new Snow College-controlled institution built upon Sevier Valley ATC and located on its campus. This merger did not result in the outcome envisioned by some in the community, and in 2001, when the Utah College of Applied Technology was created, a branch known as the Central Applied Technology College (CATC) was established on the Snow College South campus. However, the reality of two separate schools sharing a campus resulted in issues. Consequently, in 2003, the legislature combined the two schools under Snow College and officially renamed the campus as the "Snow College Richfield Campus." As part of the merger, the requirement that a curriculum in applied technology and technical courses be maintained by Snow College was included.

== Academics ==
The college offers associate degrees and certificates. It also offers bachelor's degrees in software engineering and commercial music.

The Horne School of Music has been an accredited member of the National Association of Schools of Music since 1997 and is also an All Steinway School. Snow hosts a number of music camps held annually. In 2012, the Horne School of Music began offering the first baccalaureate program in the history of the college, a Bachelor of Music degree in Commercial Music.

The theatre arts program at Snow College is accredited by the National Association of Schools of Theatre and is affiliated with the Juilliard Drama Division. It regularly produces five major productions each year as well as a student produced season of Black Box productions and a summer program featuring instructors from the Juilliard Drama Division.

== Athletics ==
Snow College athletic teams, known as the Badgers, are consistently highly ranked; its football team went undefeated and won the National Junior College Championship in 1985, with the team inducted into the NJCAA Hall of Fame in 2010, and finished #2 in 2006. Along with football, Snow College participates in women's volleyball, men's and women's soccer, men's and women's basketball, men's and women's wrestling, softball, men's and women's cross country, and rodeo.

== Notable alumni ==
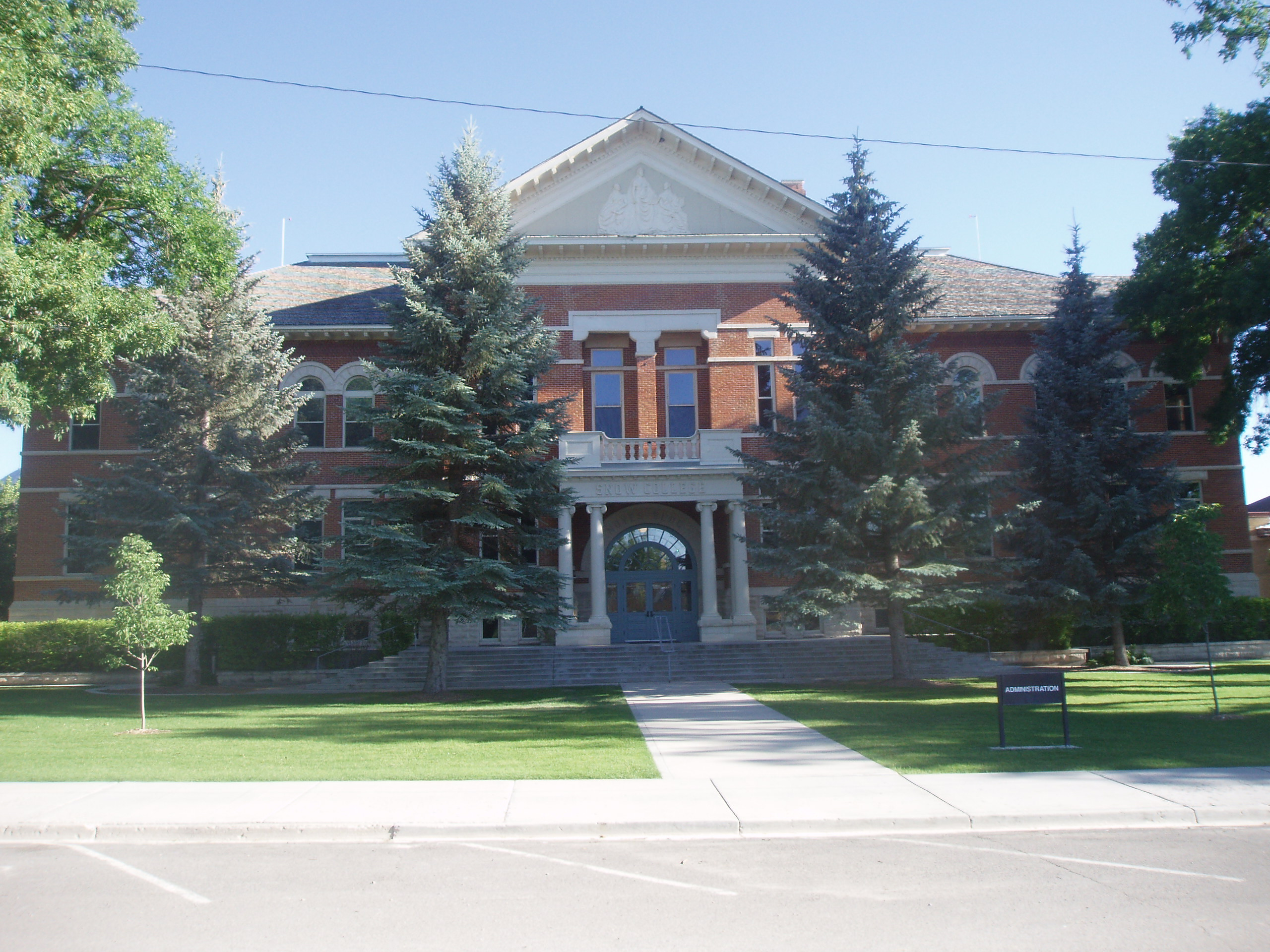
The Noyes Building

- David Archer, professional football player
- Matt Asiata, professional football player
- Kapri Bibbs, professional football player
- Garett Bolles, professional football player
- Aaron Boone, professional football player
- Josh Burkman, professional MMA fighter
- Land Clark, professional football player referee
- Spencer Cox, current Governor of Utah
- Kevin Curtis, professional football player
- Malcolm DeWalt IV, professional football player
- Mario Fatafehi, professional football player
- Josh Heupel, college football player and coach
- Tyler Hughes, college football coach
- Brett Keisel, professional football player
- Star Lotulelei, professional football player
- Deuce Lutui, professional football player
- Bronco Mendenhall, college football coach
- Mark Russell, Professional football player, Lawyer, President and CEO of Nikola
- Jackson Vroman, professional basketball player
- Jaylen Warren, professional football player

== See also ==
- J. Elliot Cameron, president from 1956 to 1958
- Michael T. Benson, president from 2001 to 2006
- Scott L. Wyatt, president from 2007 to 2013
- Brad Cook, president from January 2019 to July 2022
- Noyes Building, the administrative building on campus
- Saga of the Sanpitch
