= Ronald R. Ingle =

President of Coastal Carolina University
- In office 1993–2007
- Preceded by: Himself as Chancellor
- Succeeded by: David A. DeCenzo

Chancellor of Coastal Carolina College
- In office 1992–1993
- Preceded by: Ronald G. Eaglin
- Succeeded by: Himself as President

Vice Chancellor of Academic Affairs at Coastal Carolina College
- In office 1988–1992

Personal details
- Born: April 9, 1940 Shelby, North Carolina
- Died: January 18, 2023 (aged 82) Murrells Inlet, South Carolina
- Education: Wofford College (B.A.); Florida State University (M.S.); Ohio State University (Ph.D.)
- Profession: Academic administrator

Ronald Rudloff Ingle (April 9, 1940 – January 18, 2023) was the seventh chief executive of Coastal Carolina University from 1992 to 2007. He was the last chancellor of the school while it was still a branch campus of the University of South Carolina from 1992 to 1993. After Coastal became fully independent of USC in 1993, Ingle became the new university's first president, serving until his retirement in 2007.

Dr. Ingle earned a Bachelor of Arts degree from Wofford College, a Master of Science degree in Higher Education Administration from Florida State University, and a Doctor of Philosophy degree in psychology from Ohio State University. Prior to his tenure at Coastal Carolina University, Ingle held administrative and teaching positions at the University of South Carolina, Kennesaw College, and South Georgia College. Most recently, Ingle served a two-year appointment as Executive Vice President at Young Harris College, a private liberal arts college in Georgia.

Dr. Ingle's career focus has been assisting higher education institutions during periods of transition. He has served on numerous civic and educational boards, including the boards of directors of the American Association of State Colleges and Universities and South Carolina Sea Grant Consortium; as commissioner for the Commission on Colleges, Southern Association of Colleges and Schools; and as governor's appointee from South Carolina for the Southern Regional Educational Board.

In 2001, Dr. Ingle was awarded the "Ambassador of Peace Award for Vision and Courage" from the Louis Gregory Bahá'í Institute.

== See also ==
- List of leaders of Coastal Carolina University
