= Ephraim United Order Cooperative Building =

- U.S. National Register of Historic Places
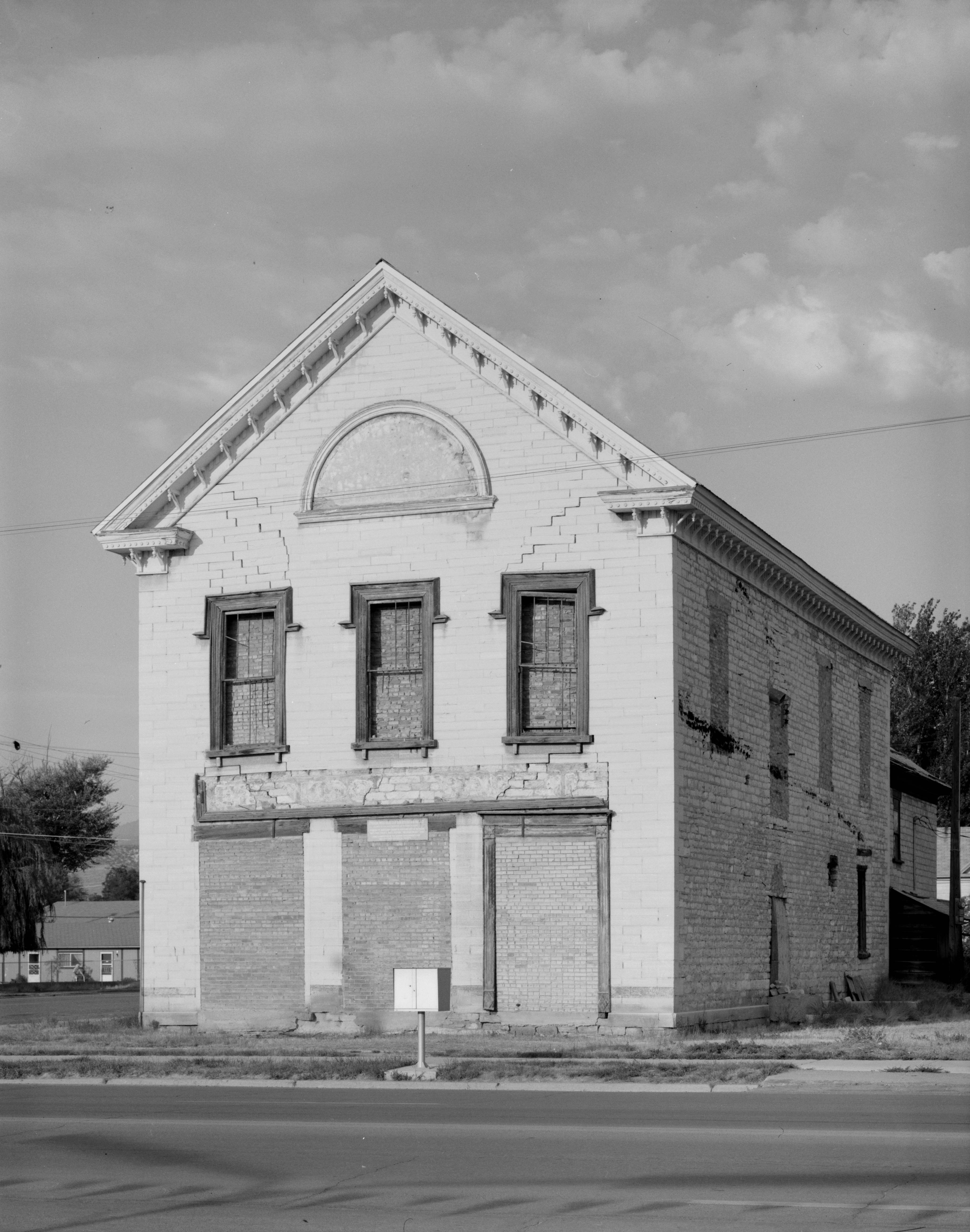
- Ephraim United Order Cooperative Building (southwest corner), 1985

- Location within Utah Location within the United States
- Location: 96 North Main Street (U.S. Route 89); Ephraim, Utah; United States
- Coordinates: 39°21′41″N 111°35′9″W
- Area: less than one acre
- Built: 1871
- NRHP reference No.: 73001862
- Added to NRHP: March 20, 1973

The Ephraim United Order Cooperative Building is a historic commercial building in downtown Ephraim, Utah, United States, that is listed on the National Register of Historic Places.

== Description ==
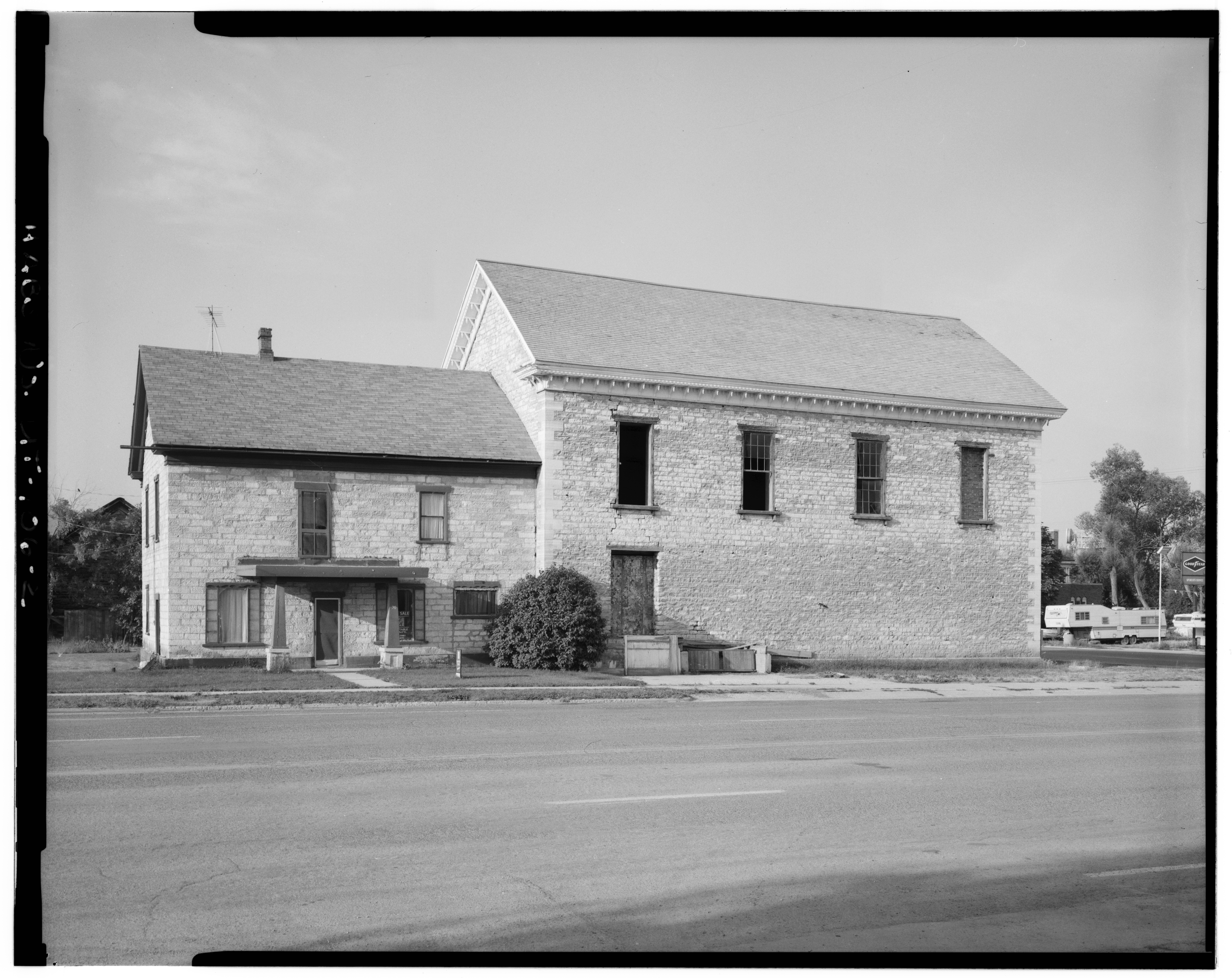
Looking across East 100 North at the northeast corner of the Ephraim United Order Mercantile Institution, 1985

The building is located at 96 North Main Street (U.S. Route 89), on the corner with East 100 North. It was built in 1871-72 to house a Mormon cooperative store in community. The store was established to avoid trading with "gentile" (non-Mormon) merchants, and sold merchandise from the ZCMI co-op in Salt Lake City. The two-story stone building housed a co-op store on the ground floor and a meeting hall on the upper level. In 1888 the Sanpete Stake Academy was established, using the meeting hall for classes; it became Snow College in 1917.

The front of the building is clad in white oolitic Sanpete limestone on the front with coarser building stone on the other elevations. A steeply pitched roof runs from front to back with bracketed eaves and eave returns over the three-bay front elevation. The side elevations are four bays wide, with a one-story extension to the rear. The building features the inscription "Ephraim U.O. Mercantile Institution" and a beehive surrounded by "Holiness to the Lord" in an arched panel on the building's front gable. A similarly constructed stone granary stands nearby on the site.

The building was placed on the National Register of Historic Places on March 20, 1973. After restoration work the store is operated as a gift shop.

== See also ==
- National Register of Historic Places listings in Sanpete County, Utah
