= Noyes Building =

- Snow Academy Building
- U.S. National Register of Historic Places
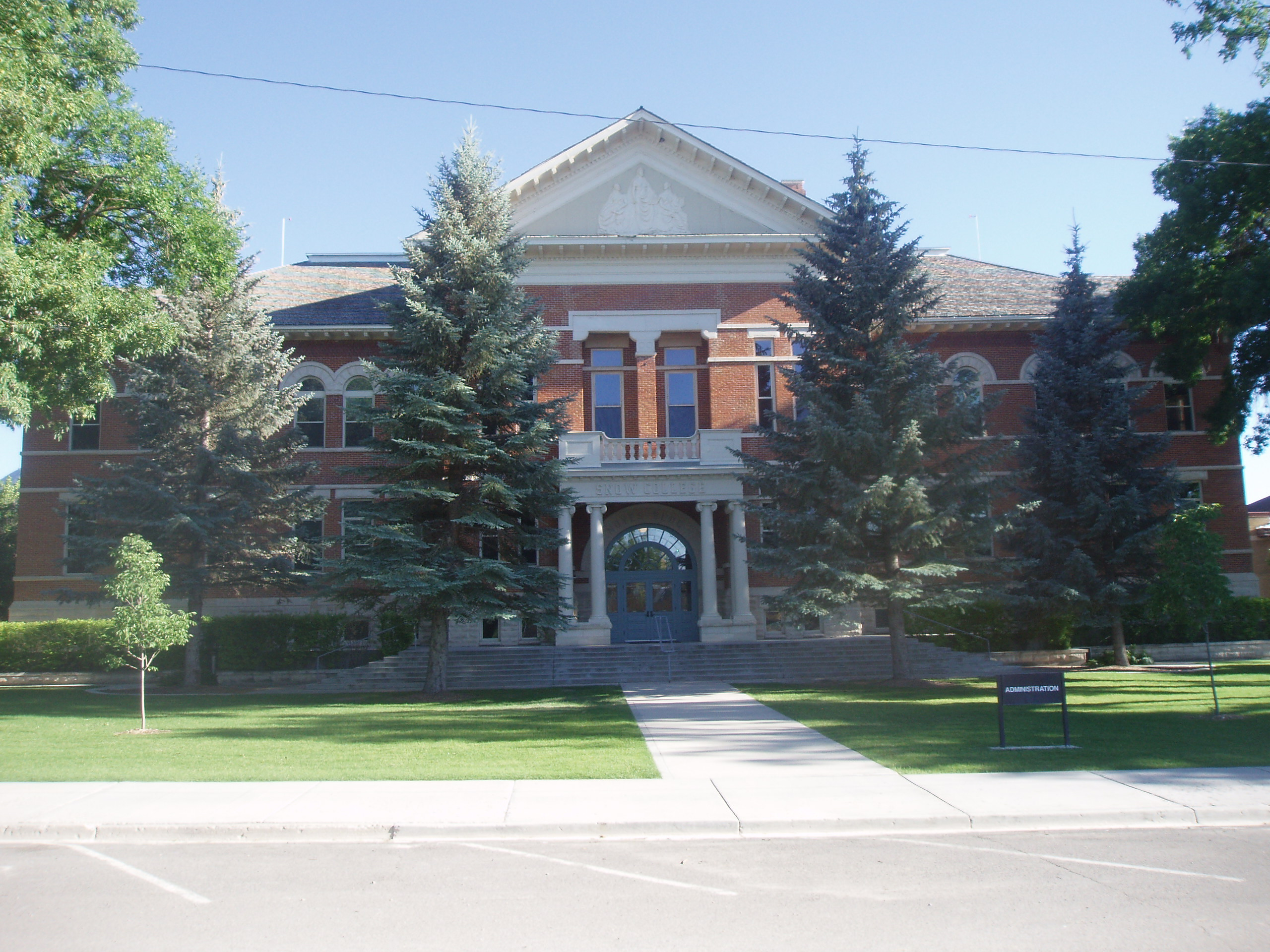
- Snow Academy Building

- Location within Utah Location within the United States
- Location: 150 College Ave., Ephraim, Utah
- Coordinates: 39°21′40″N 111°34′56″W
- Area: less than one acre
- Built: 1899-1908
- Built by: Madsen & Anderson
- Architect: Richard C. Watkins
- Architectural style: Classical Revival
- NRHP reference No.: 87002062
- Added to NRHP: November 20, 1987

Named for Newton E. Noyes, the Noyes Building is the administrative building on the Snow College campus, which is located in Ephraim, Utah. It houses both the administrative offices and the mathematics department. The money to build the Noyes building was entirely earned by the Ephraim community through the sale of their "Sunday eggs," the eggs their chickens laid on Sundays. The building has been listed as Snow Academy Building on the National Register of Historic Places since November 20, 1987. It was designed by Richard C. Watkins.

It is a two-story brick and stone building which was built during 1899 to 1908. It is primarily Classical Revival in style.
