= Steve Benson (cartoonist) =

American editorial cartoonist (1954–2025)

Stephen Benson
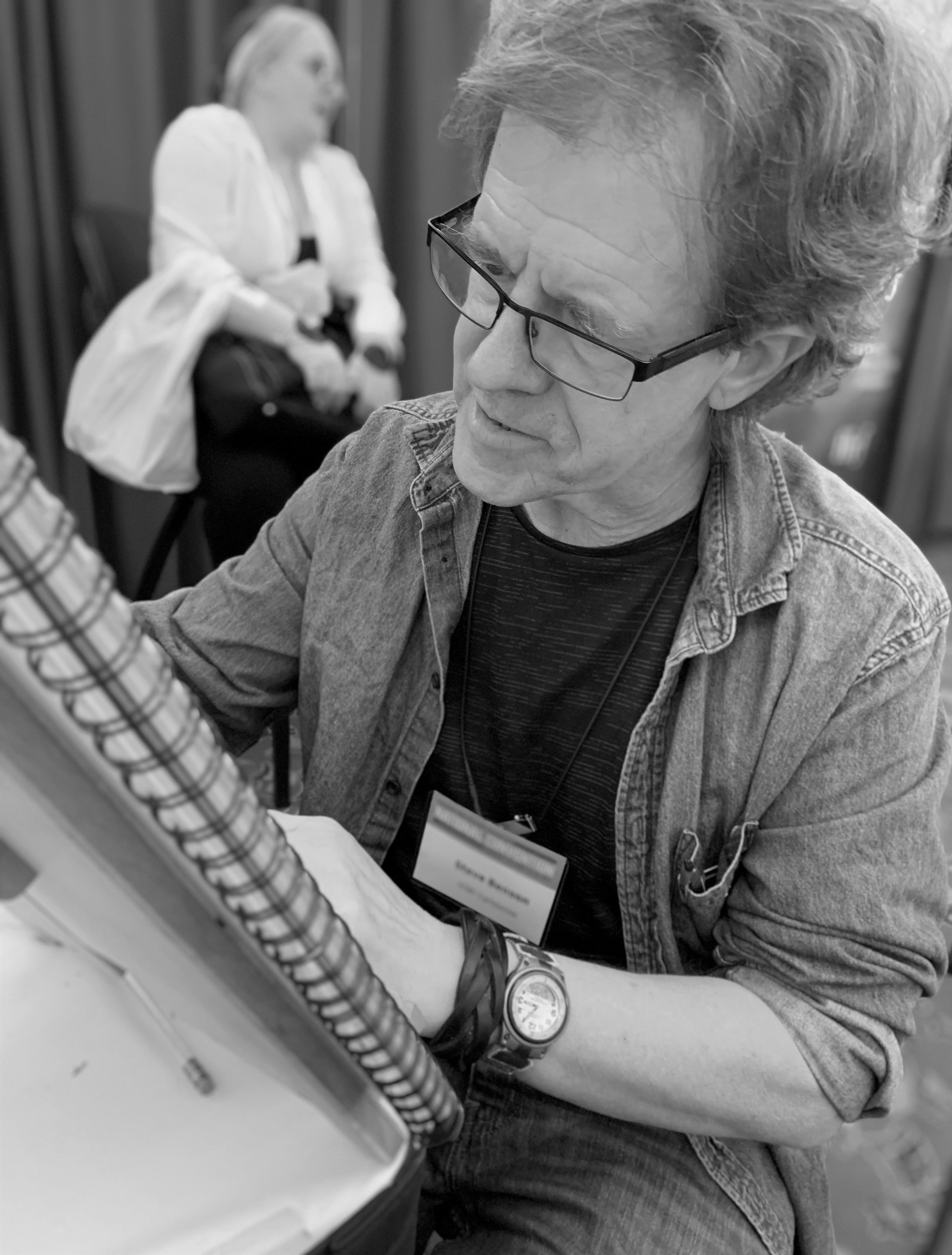
- Benson in 2019
- Born: January 2, 1954; Sacramento, California, U.S.
- Died: July 8, 2025 (aged 71); Gilbert, Arizona, U.S.
- Occupation: Cartoonist
- Years active: 1980–2023
- Spouses: Mary Ann Christensen (m. 1977, divorced); Claire Ferguson (m. 2020)
- Children: 4
- Relatives: Ezra Taft Benson (grandfather) Michael T. Benson (brother)
- Family: Taft family
- Awards: Pulitzer Prize (1993)

Stephen Reed Benson (January 2, 1954 – July 8, 2025) was an American editorial cartoonist. In a career spanning over 40 years, most of it spent at The Arizona Republic, Benson was awarded the Pulitzer Prize for Editorial Cartooning in 1993.

== Background ==
Stephen Reed Benson was born on January 2, 1954, in Sacramento, California, and grew up in Texas, Indiana, and Utah. As the grandson of former U.S. Secretary of Agriculture and former LDS Church president Ezra Taft Benson, he attended Brigham Young University, from which he graduated cum laude. He was a Mormon missionary in Japan for two years.

Benson was married to Mary Ann Christensen in 1977, and to Claire Ferguson in 2020. His first marriage, which produced four children, ended in divorce.

Benson died from complications arising from a stroke on July 8, 2025, at the age of 71, at a care facility in Gilbert, Arizona.

== Career ==
Benson became the cartoonist for The Arizona Republic in 1980. He moved to the Tacoma Morning News Tribune in 1990, but then returned to The Arizona Republic in 1991, and remained until laid off in January 2019. Until retiring in 2023, Benson was the staff political cartoonist for the Arizona Mirror and his work continued to be nationally distributed by Creators Syndicate.

=== Reception ===
Benson was awarded the 1993 Pulitzer Prize for Editorial Cartooning, was a Pulitzer finalist in 1984, 1989, 1992, and 1994, and received a variety of other awards. He served as president of the Association of American Editorial Cartoonists. His cartoons have been collected in a number of books.

In 1983, Benson drew a cartoon making light of the heavy rainfall which accompanied Queen Elizabeth II's state visit to the Western United States that year. The Queen enjoyed the cartoon, and Benson sent her a copy at the request of Buckingham Palace.

Described The New York Times as "provocative", Benson's cartoons sometimes incurred harsh responses. Barry Goldwater, comparing Benson to his grandfather, once told him "There are – and have been – good Bensons. You ain't".

In the late 1980s, he was at first a supporter, then a prominent critic, of Evan Mecham, the first Mormon to be elected governor of Arizona. Benson's criticism stirred controversy among Arizona's Mormon population, leading some LDS Church members to seek the intervention of Benson's grandfather in the matter. In the midst of the scandal, Governor Mecham telephoned Benson and told him to stop drawing critical cartoons about him, or his eternal soul would be in jeopardy. Benson was later relieved of his position on a stake high council.

In 1993, Benson faced further controversy within the LDS Church, when he stated that his grandfather, then nearing his 94th birthday, was suffering from senility that was being concealed by church leadership. Later that year, Benson publicly left the church. He later became a critic of religious belief, appearing at Freedom From Religion Foundation's annual conventions and stating in its paper Freethought Today, "If, as the true believers claim, the word 'gospel' means good news, then the good news for me is that there is no gospel, other than what I can define for myself, by observation and conscience. As a freethinking human being, I have come not to favor or fear religion, but to face and fight it as an impediment to civilized advancement."

In 1997, Benson used a famed image of a firefighter carrying a dead child from the wreckage of the Oklahoma City bombing as the basis for a cartoon criticizing what, in his words, was "the ultimate irony" of sentencing defendant Timothy McVeigh to death. Benson was accused of insensitivity towards the original image, which he said "completely missed the intent" of his work.

In 1999, Benson released a political cartoon titled "Texas Bonfire Traditions." In the cartoon, he compared the 1999 Aggie Bonfire collapse to the Waco siege of 1993 and the murder of James Byrd Jr. in 1998. This prompted negative reactions and criticism from Texas A&M, and forced The Arizona Republic to remove the cartoon.
