= Coastal Carolina University =

Public university in Conway, South Carolina, US

Coordinates: 33.794722°N 79.011667°W

- Former name: List: Coastal Carolina Junior College (1954–1960) University of South Carolina Coastal Carolina College (1960–1993)
- Motto: Ex Libertate Veritas (Latin)
- Motto in English: "From Liberty, Truth"
- Type: Public university
- Established: September 20, 1954; 71 years ago (opened)
- Accreditation: SACS
- Academic affiliations: Sea-grant
- Endowment: $76.2 million (2024)
- President: James J. Winebrake
- Provost: Gibbs Knotts, Ph.D.
- Faculty: 514
- Students: 11,881 (fall 2025)
- Undergraduates: 10,306 (fall 2023)
- Postgraduates: 523 (fall 2023)
- Location: Conway, South Carolina, United States
- Campus: 630 acres (2.5 km^{2}); Small city
- Newspaper: The Chanticleer
- Colors: Teal, bronze, and black
- Nickname: Chanticleers
- Sporting affiliations: NCAA Division I FBS – Sun Belt; ASUN
- Mascots: Chauncey the Chanticleer
- Website: coastal.edu

Coastal Carolina University (CCU or Coastal) is a public university in Conway, South Carolina, United States. Founded in 1954 as Coastal Carolina Junior College, and later joining the University of South Carolina System as USC Coastal Carolina, it became an independent university in 1993.

The university is a national sea-grant institution and owns part of Waties Island, an Atlantic barrier island that serves as a natural laboratory for CCU's instruction and research. The campus is also the home of the Horry County Schools Scholars Academy, a high school for gifted students.

== History ==
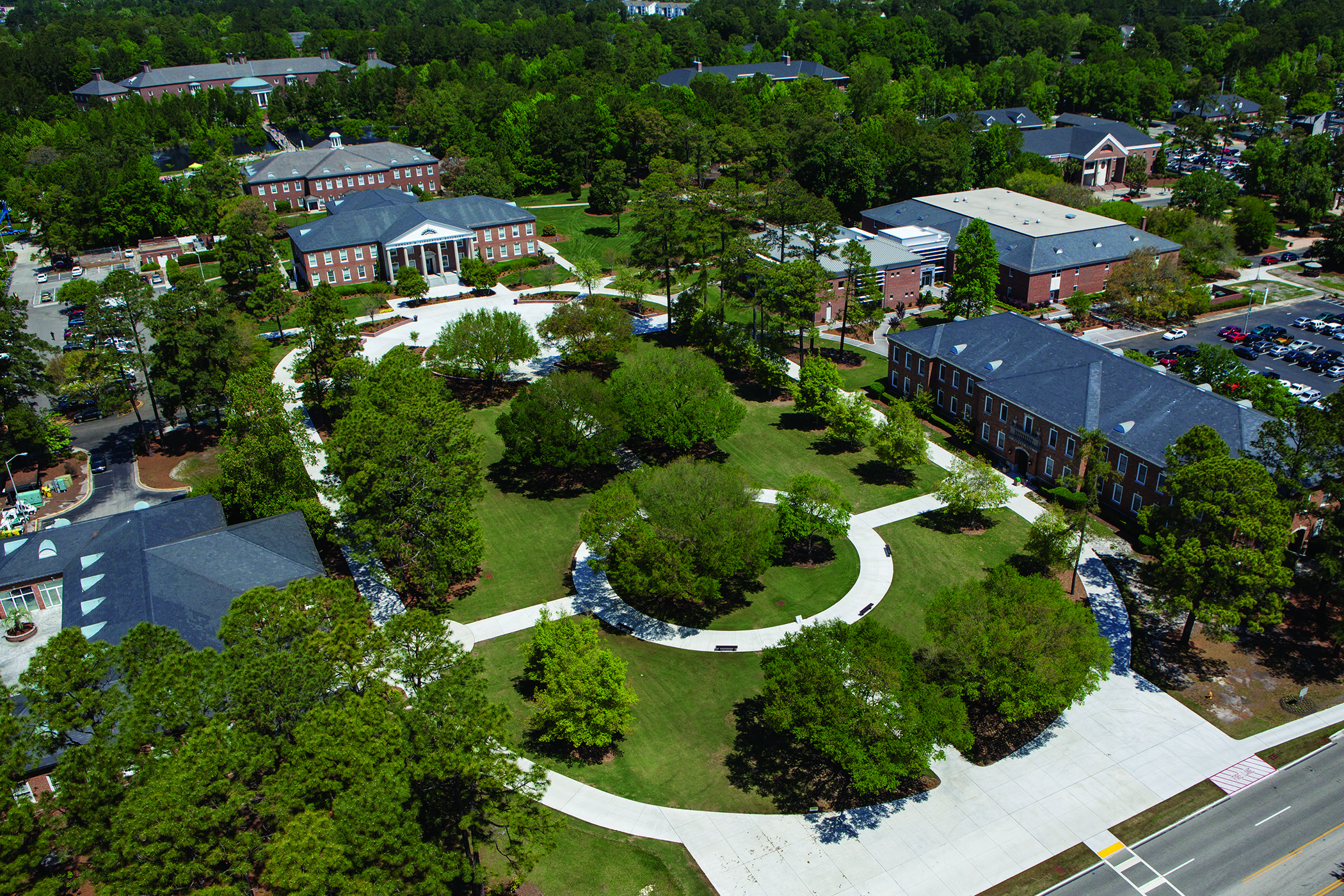
Framed by Blanton Park, the Edward M. Singleton Building was the first building on campus, built in 1963.

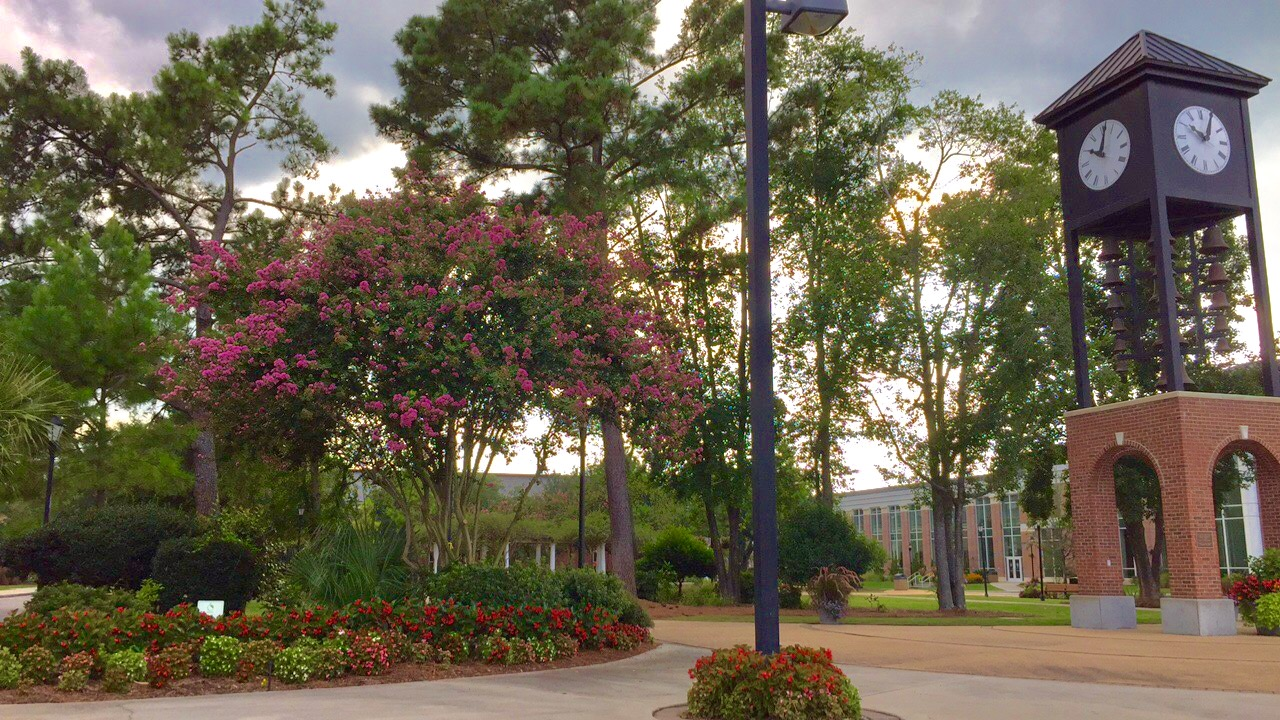
The Graham Family Bell Tower in the forefront of Spadoni Park

Coastal Carolina University was founded in 1954 as Coastal Carolina Junior College, a two-year community college, by the Coastal Educational Foundation, a group of citizens who wanted to establish a post-secondary institution in the region. The college originally operated under contract as an extension of the College of Charleston. Classes met at night at Conway High School and were taught by part-time faculty. After the College of Charleston contract expired in 1958, Coastal became an independent community college supported by Horry County.

The Horry County Educational Commission was created in 1959 to oversee the college's county tax money. This body was responsible for contracting operations to the University of South Carolina a year later under the name Coastal Carolina Regional Campus. The deal was finalized at the Chat 'n' Chew restaurant in Turbeville, South Carolina, a town halfway between Conway and Columbia. The site of the present-day campus, by now known as USC Coastal Carolina College, was chosen in 1960, on a plot of land between U.S. 501 and S.C. 544, on land owned by Burroughs Timber Company and International Paper. The campus' first building, later named the Edward M. Singleton Building, opened in 1963.

A decade of growth saw the school add a third year in 1973 and a fourth in 1974. The first residence halls (currently "The Woods" residence halls) opened in 1987. By 1991, enrollment had grown to over 4,000 students, leading the Coastal Educational Foundation and Horry County Educational Commission to seek independent status for the school. A year later, the USC system's board of trustees lent its support to independent status for Coastal. On July 1, 1993, the school officially became an autonomous state institution under the name Coastal Carolina University, in a bill signed into law by South Carolina Governor Carroll Campbell on the steps of the Singleton Building. Ronald R. Ingle, the last chancellor of Coastal Carolina College, became the newly minted university's first president. The Coastal Carolina Chanticleers football team opened its inaugural game vs. Newberry College on Sept. 6, 2003, in front of a crowd of more than 8,000 at the newly opened Brooks Stadium. In 2004, Coastal Carolina University celebrated its 50th anniversary; the same year, enrollment reached 7,000 students, and CCU opened the first phase of the University Place housing complex across S.C. 544.

Throughout the 2010s, the university experienced a building boom achieved as a result of a local 1-cent sales tax for education-related construction (the present Brittain Hall was originally dubbed "Penny Hall" in honor of the penny tax that helped fund its construction). In 2014, the university established its first doctoral degree program, in coastal and marine science systems science. In 2016, the Chanticleers baseball team won the College World Series, the first national title for the university. On July 1, 2016, the Coastal Carolina Chanticleers athletic programs officially joined the Sun Belt Conference. The following year, enrollment reached 10,600 students.

=== Leadership ===
In October 2020, Coastal Carolina University announced the appointment of Michael T. Benson as its third president and ninth leader. Benson began his tenure on January 1, 2021. He replaced David A. DeCenzo, who retired after serving for nearly 14 years as the university's president. On July 7, 2025, Benson was replaced by James J. Winebrake as the fourth president of the university.

=== Rankings and recognitions ===
U.S. News & World Report (South) 2025 rankings:

- No. 7 in Best Undergraduate Teaching
- No. 14 in Best Colleges for Veterans
- No. 15 Top Public Schools

Coastal Carolina University has also been recognized for its outstanding research, mental health services, military support, and more.

- CCU earned a Research College and Universities designation in the 2025 report by the Carnegie Classification of Institutions of Higher Education. This classification recognizes institutions that invest at least $2.5 million annually in research and development. Based on the latest data, CCU surpassed this threshold with $4.7 million in research expenditures in fiscal year 2023.
- The university is recognized as a Top Producing Institution of Fulbright U.S. Students, according to the U.S. Department of State's Bureau of Educational and Cultural Affairs. CCU is one of 84 institutions in the nation on this list and the only school in South Carolina with this distinction. The Fulbright Program is the U.S. government's flagship international academic exchange program.
- In 2024, CCU was one of 16 schools nationwide named to the Princeton Review's inaugural Mental Health Honor Roll list. For the honor roll initiative, the Princeton Review emphasized students' quality of life and its impact on well-being, how schools equip students to manage mental health through education programs and peer-to-peer support, and the role of administrative efforts in fostering campus mental health.
- The university earned a spot on the 2024 Military Times Best for Vets: Colleges list. The survey seeks details about a school's costs, programs, policies, and services that impact military-connected students. Data from the U.S. Departments of Education and Veterans Affairs were also evaluated.
- CCU is a designated Gold Status Military Friendly School for 2024–2025. Military Friendly uses a comprehensive methodology to evaluate an institution's policies, programs, and resources that support the military community.
- The university was recognized by the ALL IN Campus Democracy Challenge (ALL IN) as a 2024 ALL IN Most Engaged Campus for College Student Voting. The ALL IN Most Engaged Campuses for College Student Voting recognizes colleges and universities' outstanding efforts to increase nonpartisan student voter participation.

== Academic organization ==
=== Conway Medical Center College of Health and Human Performance ===
The Conway Medical Center College of Health and Human Performance is home to the following academic units: public health, nursing, health administration, exercise and sport science, recreation and sport management, and sport management (master's degree). The university's newest college began operating on July 1, 2022, and is supported by a university-record $10 million donation from Conway Medical Center.

=== E. Craig Wall Sr. College of Business Administration ===
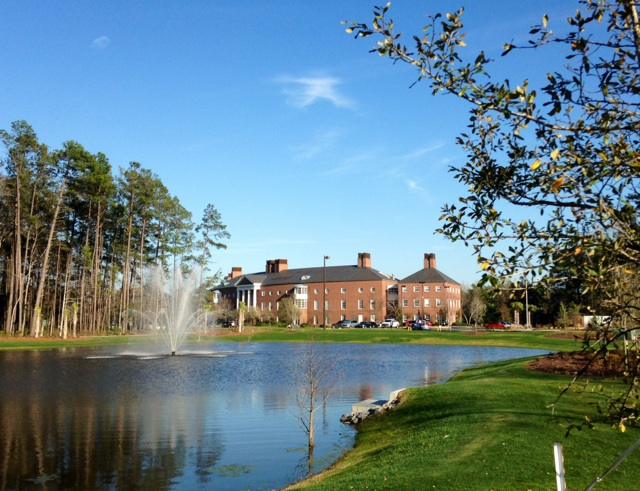
The E. Craig Wall Sr. College of Business Administration

The business college, named for businessman E. Craig Wall Sr., offers six undergraduate majors: accounting, economics, finance, management, marketing and hospitality and resort tourism management. The PGA Golf Management program is one of only 18 programs in the nation accredited by the PGA of America. Business students can also minor in business, economics, international business, or marketing. The business college also offers two graduate programs, the Master of Business Administration (MBA) program and the Master of Accountancy (MAcc) program, and a graduate certificate in fraud examination. For those who wish to earn a degree in a shorter amount of time, there is a Degree in Three program where students can earn a Bachelor of Science in Business Administration (BSBA) degree in three years; and the Get More in Four program, which is a combined four-year undergraduate and Master of Business Administration (MBA) program. The Wall College of Business is accredited by the Association to Advance Collegiate Schools of Business (AACSB International).

=== Spadoni College of Education and Social Sciences ===
The Spadoni College of Education and Social Sciences grants the degrees Bachelor of Arts in the areas of early childhood education, elementary education, middle-level education, and special education learning disabilities; Bachelor of Science in physical education; Master of Education in the areas of educational leadership, Instructional Technology, Special Education, and in Language, Literacy and Culture. A Master of Arts in Teaching program is offered in six specialization areas, and certificate and licensure programs are offered in online teaching, literacy, and special education. The college also awards an Interdisciplinary Ph.D. in education. The College of Education is accredited by the National Council for the Accreditation of Teacher Education (NCATE), and each of its constituent programs is recognized by the South Carolina Department of Education and its corresponding specialized professional association (SPA). The Spadoni College of Education is home to several research and outreach endeavors, including the Biddle Center for Teaching, Learning, and Community Engagement; the Chanticleer Center for Literacy Education; The Early Childhood Development and Literacy Center; and The Georgetown Education Residence program.

On Oct. 1, 2020, the university announced that it would be restructuring the Spadoni College of Education by combining it with programs from the Edwards College of Humanities and Fine Arts, as well as the Gupta College of Science. On July 1, 2021, the name of the college was changed to the Spadoni College of Education and Social Sciences. Dr. Holley Tankersley was named the first dean of the newly combined college.

=== Thomas W. and Robin W. Edwards College of Humanities and Fine Arts ===
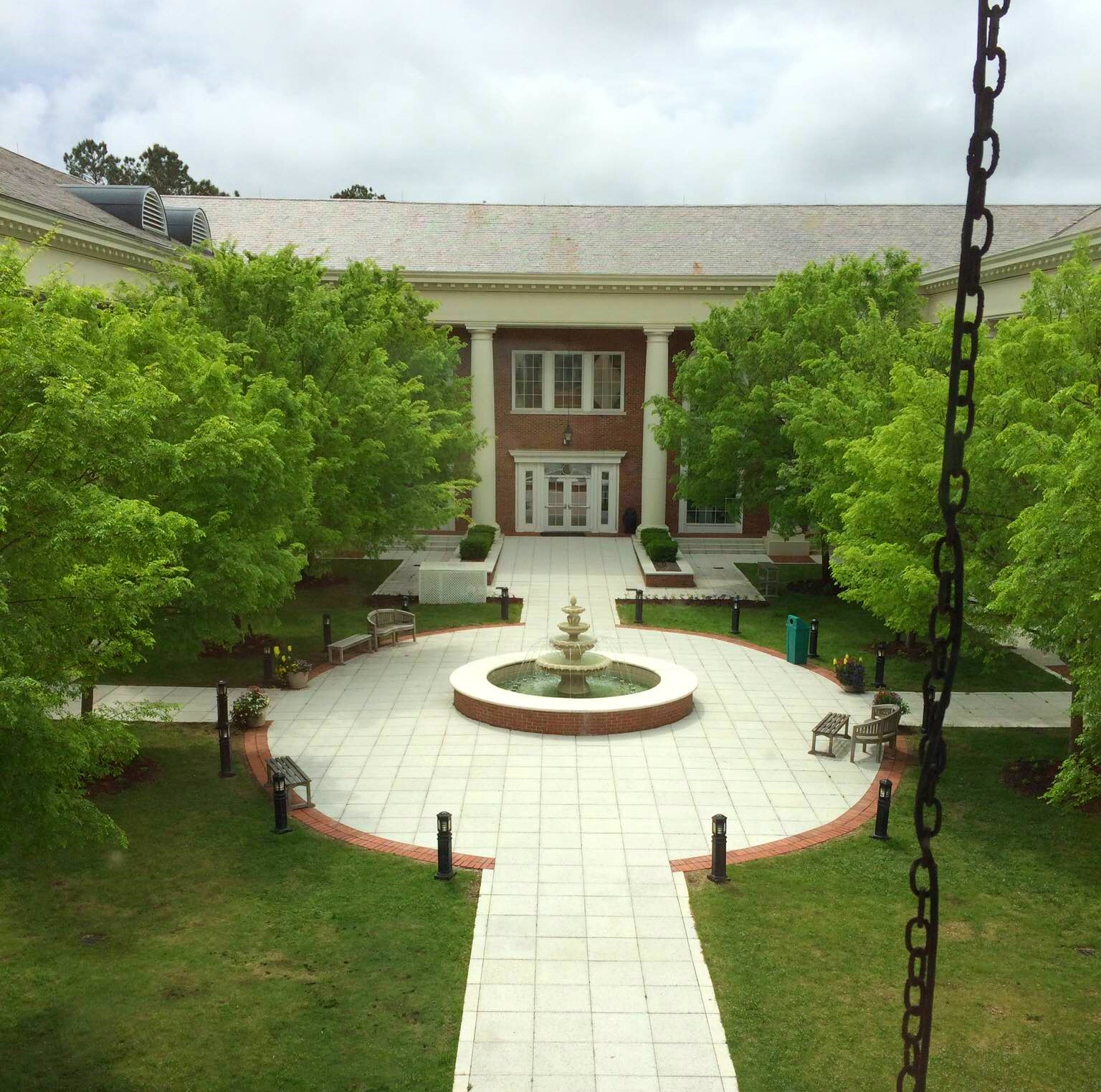
The fountain and courtyard of the Thomas W. and Robin W. Edwards College of Humanities and Fine Arts

The Edwards College houses several university initiatives, institutes, and centers including the Dyer Institute for Leadership and Public Policy, the Jackson Family Center for Ethics and Values, the Joyner Institute for Gullah and African Diaspora Studies, and the Athenaeum Press. The press is a student-driven publishing lab that offers students professional-level hands-on experience in authoring, designing and producing innovative stories.

=== Gupta College of Science ===
The Gupta College of Science offers 13 areas of study ranging from applied statistics to psychology as well as 18 minors and one certificate program. The college also offers a Master of Science degree in coastal marine and wetland studies, a Master of Science degree in information systems technology, and a Doctor of Philosophy (Ph.D.) degree in coastal and marine systems science.

The college houses the departments of biology, chemistry, coastal and marine systems science, computing sciences, marine science, mathematics and statistics, physics and engineering science, and psychology. Its marine systems department houses four sea vessels for both teaching and research. The flagship of the fleet is the R/V Coastal Explorer, a 54 ft. coastal region research vessel. The Burroughs & Chapin Center for Marine and Wetland Studies is the research and community outreach arm of the college.

In 2019, the College of Science was renamed the Gupta College of Science in recognition of a major donation by Sunny Gupta, a software entrepreneur and 1992 graduate of the university.

=== College of Graduate and Continuing Studies ===
There are programs offered from each of Coastal Carolina University's six colleges, including Master of Business Administration (MBA), Master of Arts in Teaching (M.A.T.), Master of Science in coastal marine and wetland studies (M.S.), and a Doctor of Philosophy in education sciences (Ph.D.).

=== Kimbel Library and Bryan Information Commons ===
Opened in 1977, the Kimbel Library provides research collections and resources to support students, faculty, and the surrounding community. The library also serves as a government repository and houses the Horry County Archives Center. Study spaces in the Kimbel library include technology equipped study and presentation rooms for student use and instruction rooms for librarian-led instruction sessions. Located on the first floor, the Peter C. Bolton Help Desk is the main information service center of the library and commons and is staffed during all hours that the library and commons is open.

The Bryan Information Commons is a two-story addition to the Kimbel Library. The Information Commons provides individual computer workstations, collaborative group media-scape workstations, high-tech study and presentation rooms and additional seating for study. The library and commons buildings were open 24 hours a day, seven days a week until the Fall 2020 semester, when rescheduling was necessary due to position cuts caused by the COVID-19 pandemic.

In 2021, it was announced that the Kimbel Library would undergo a $10 million renovation that will include an interior redesign and reconfiguration, upgrades to the HVAC system, and a multi-function instruction area. The renovation is estimated to be completed by the end of 2024.

=== Thompson Library ===
Thompson Library, which opened in the fall of 2024, is a $29.8 million, two-story, 64,000-square-foot library. It is named in memory of longtime Conway residents John and Barbara (Richardson) Thompson, who gave a $4.425 million estate gift to the university.

=== Reserve Officers Training Corps (ROTC) and Veterans Services ===
Coastal Carolina University is home to the Chanticleer Company of the U.S. Army ROTC program. CCU's Office of Veterans Services provides the growing veteran and veteran family member population at CCU. The university's Center for Military and Veterans Studies records and preserves the oral histories of South Carolina veterans for the Library of Congress.

== Student life ==
Undergraduate demographics as of fall 2023
Race and ethnicity	Total
White	66%
Unknown	12%
Black	11%
Hispanic	6%
Two or more races	4%
Asian	1%
International student	1%
Economic diversity
Low-income (Note: The percentage of students who received an income-based federal Pell grant intended for low-income students.)	29%
Affluent (Note: The percentage of students who are a part of the American middle class at the bare minimum.)	71%

=== Student facilities ===
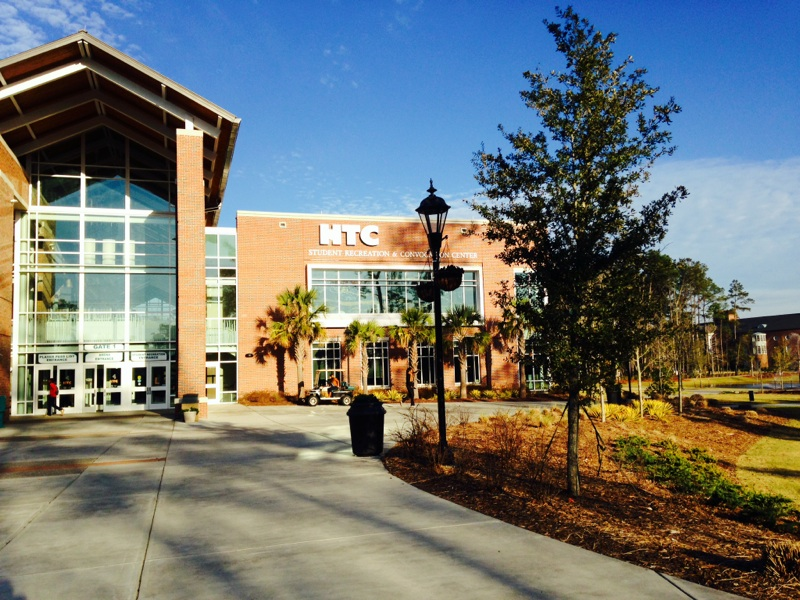
The HTC Center is home to the Chanticleer basketball teams, student recreation center and campus bookstore.

The Lib Jackson Student Union serves as the hub for student life at Coastal Carolina University. It contains a 250-seat movie theater/auditorium, conference rooms, a convenience store, and an entertainment and gaming area.

The HTC Recreation & Convocation Center opened in 2012. The LEED-certified convocation center features a 3,370 multi-purpose arena, bookstore, and a recreation center open to students, faculty, and staff. The recreation center features a large workout area with cardio machines, weight training, and a full indoor track. It is also home to several group exercise studios, a rock climbing wall, and ping pong tables.

The arena portion of the HTC Center is home to both men's and women's basketball and women's volleyball teams, whose games were formerly held in Kimbel Arena. The arena is overlooked by private suites and a catering and banquet facility.

=== University housing ===
University Housing at Coastal Carolina University maintains residential communities which house 5,399 students. The types of residential spaces range from apartment-style to traditional suite-style accommodations. A variety of programming and special interest housing communities are available to students.

The CCU Student Housing Foundation was created in 2003 as a nonprofit corporation to lease, manage and contract for the construction of student housing facilities. The foundation oversaw the construction of University Place, and the university's trustees moved to purchase University Place from the foundation in 2014.

=== Student activities ===
Student organizations include the Student Government Association (SGA), S.T.A.R. (Students Taking Active Responsibility) and the Coastal Activities Board, along with a number of other academic, honor, service, interest, social, and religious organizations. Intramural sports are also offered through the Department of Campus Recreation.

The SGA is the governing body of the campus and is in charge of allocating and disbursing funds to the clubs and organizations on campus. Executive positions include president, executive vice-president, chief of staff, president pro-tempore, vice president for finance, and vice president for public relations. Elections for SGA positions are held each spring. The SGA's legislative body is composed of two senators from each grade and college who are elected by the student body. SGA has passed legislation to change various policies on campus. Over the years, they have passed legislation to create the HTC Center, Rowdy Rooster, and have made replacement CINO cards free to students.

=== Club sports ===
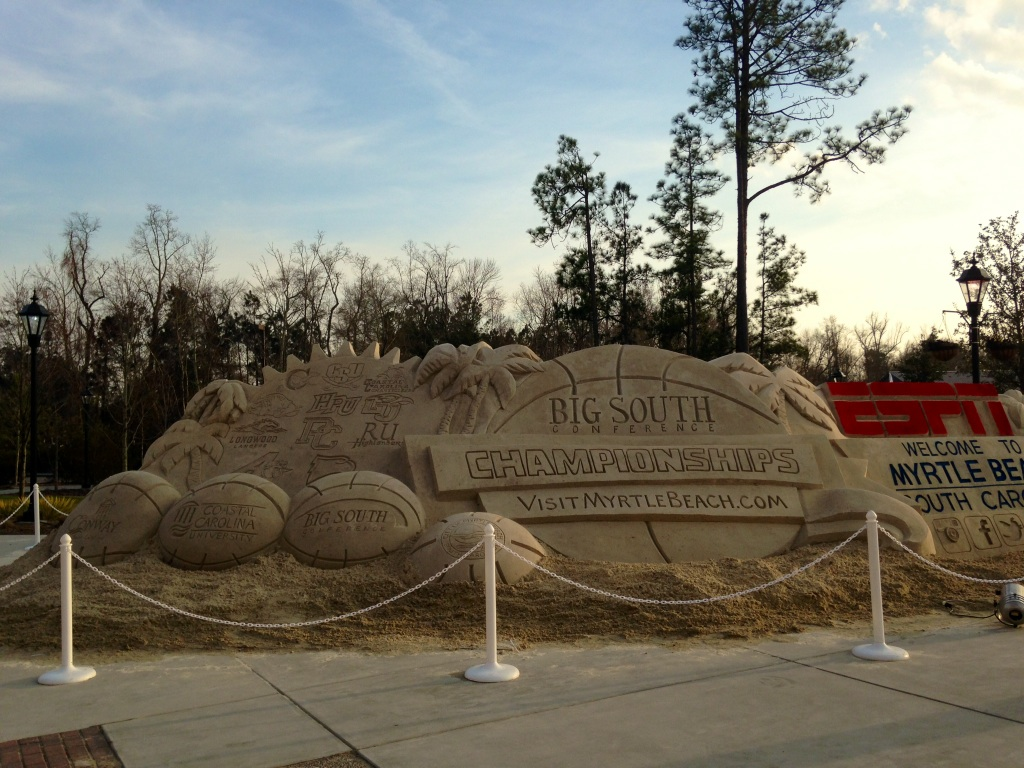
A sand sculpture during the 2015 Big South Conference men's basketball tournament held at Coastal Carolina University

Coastal Carolina University boasts an array of 22 competitive and non-competitive club sports including: baseball, soccer (M), soccer (W), lacrosse (M), lacrosse (W), fishing, surfing, rugby, equestrian, and field hockey among others.

The Chanticleer Rugby club, a member of USA Rugby South, won the Small College National Championship in 2009. The club also won the 2009 NSCRO Men's Division III Rugby tournament.

=== Student media ===
- The Chanticleer — The student newspaper
- Archarios – A student-produced literary art magazine
- Tempo — A student-produced features magazine
- WCCU — A student-run online radio station

== Greek life ==
About 13% of Coastal Carolina's students are active in Greek system. There are over 15 social Greek letter organizations on campus.

== Athletics ==
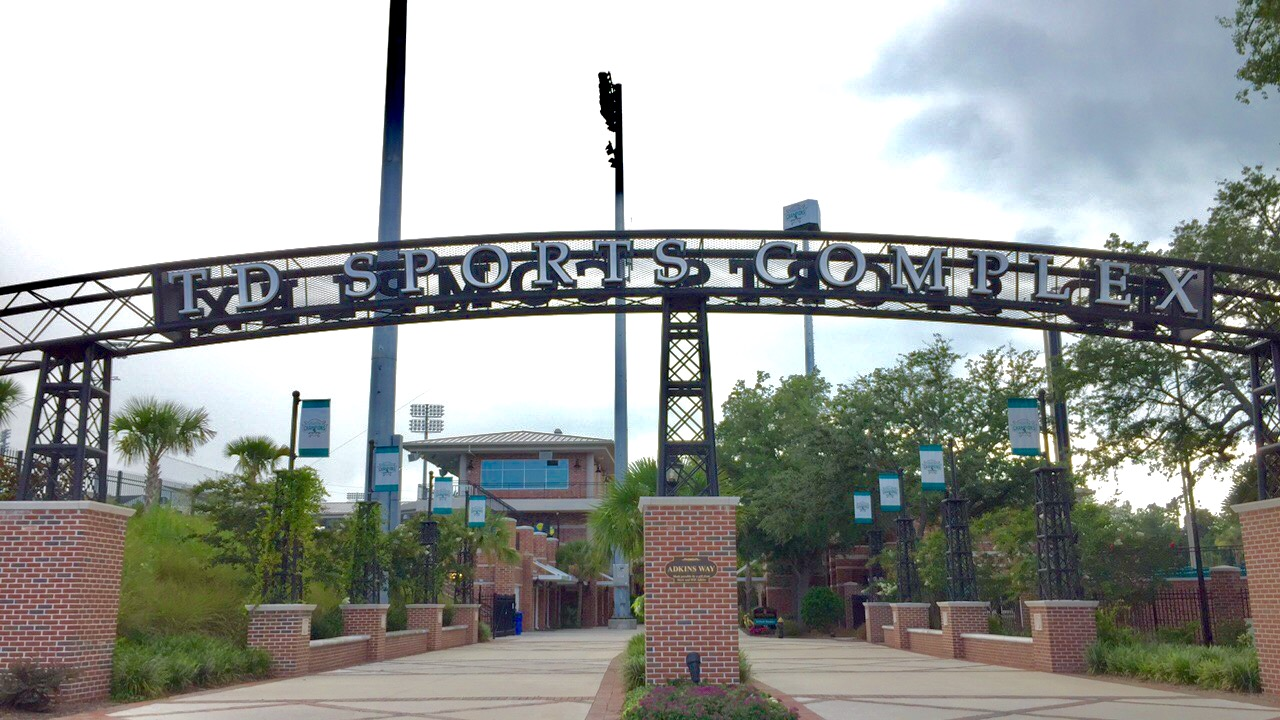
The entrance to the TD Sports Complex. Springs Brooks Stadium is on the left.

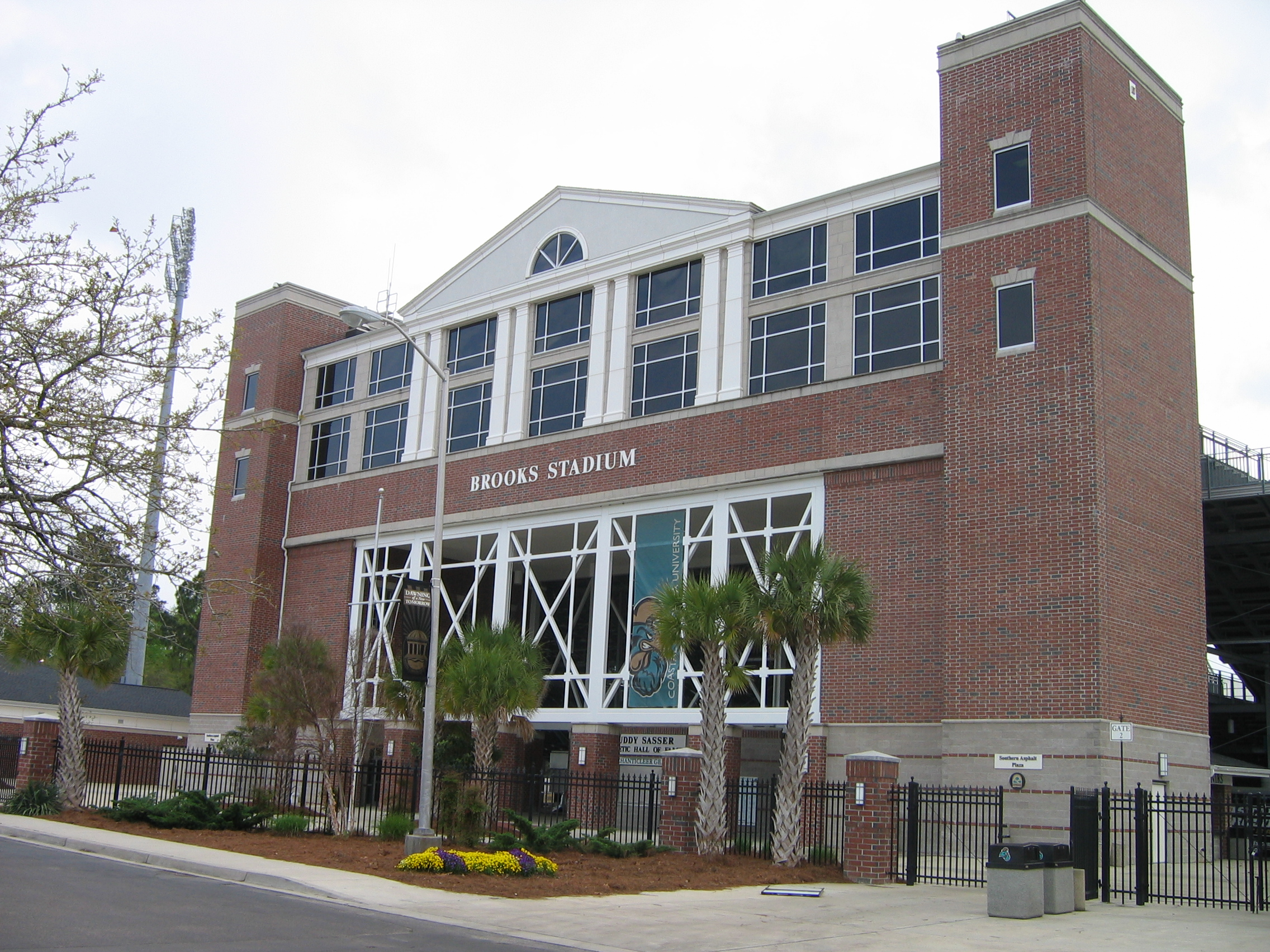
The Coastal Carolina Chanticleers football team plays at Brooks Stadium.

From 1983 through the 2015–16 school year, Coastal Carolina's athletic programs competed in NCAA Division I as a member of the Big South Conference, while the football team, which began play in 2003, competed in the NCAA Football Championship Subdivision (FCS). On September 1, 2015, Coastal Carolina announced it would leave the Big South Conference following the 2015–16 school year to transition to FBS-level football and the Sun Belt Conference. The university joined in all sports except for football starting July 1, 2016, with football joining in 2017.

The football team plays at the 20,000-seat Brooks Stadium, which is notable for its teal artificial turf. Following the announcement of the university joining the Sun Belt Conference, Brooks Stadium will undergo construction to expand the stadium to 20,000 seats. The NCAA requires FBS programs to maintain an average attendance of at least 15,000 over a rolling two-year cycle. The addition will complete a lower-level seating bowl between the home, visitors, and student sections, as well as adding a second level to the section backing up to S.C. 544.

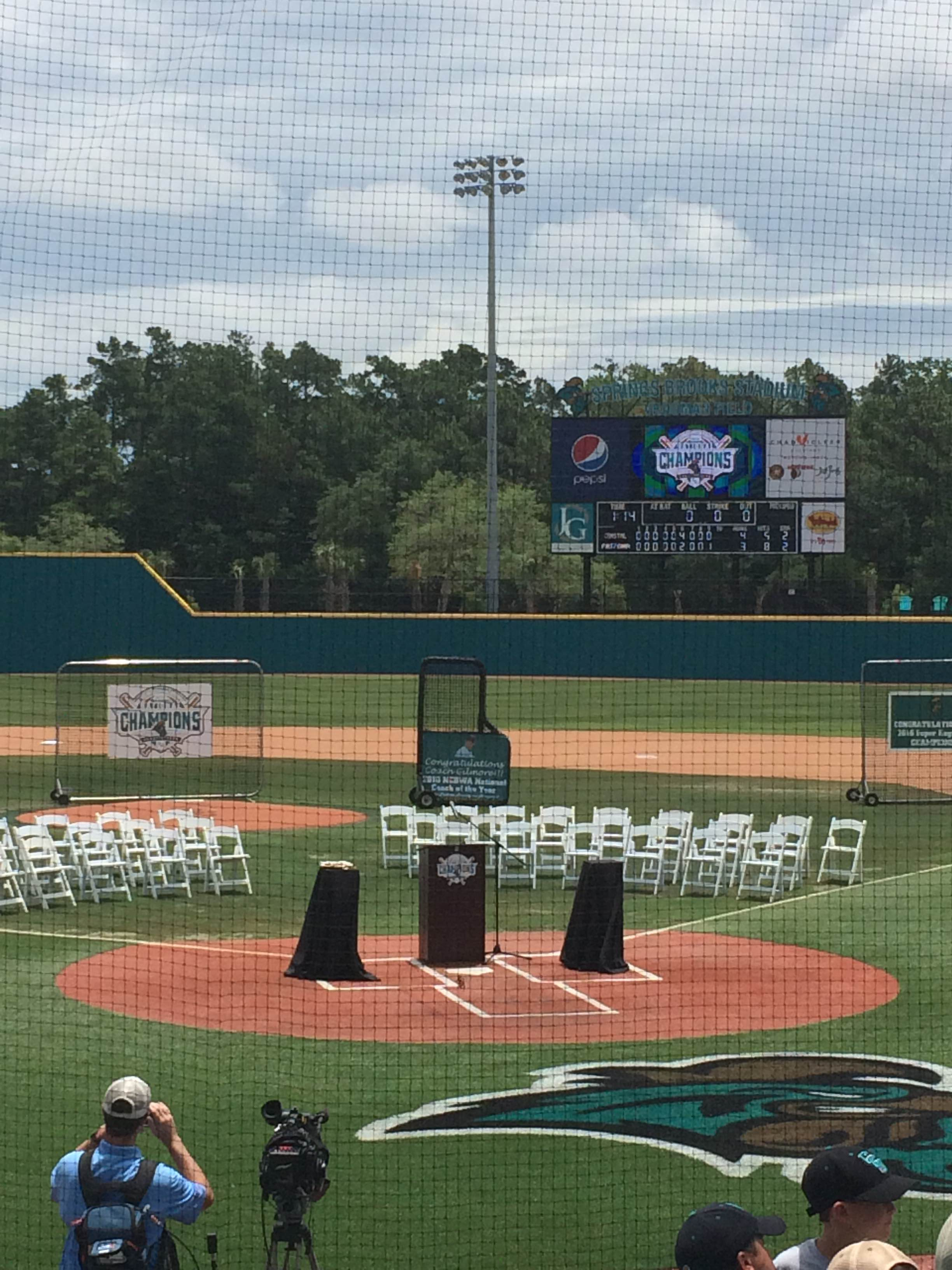
Springs Brooks Stadium

Coastal Carolina's athletic teams were once known as the Trojans. Once the school established an affiliation with the University of South Carolina, Coastal Carolina decided to select a mascot in line with the parent institution's mascot, the Gamecock. The ultimate choice was the Chanticleer (pronounced SHON-ti-clear), the proud, witty rooster made famous in "The Nun's Priest's Tale" of Chaucer's The Canterbury Tales. The university's teams are affectionately known as the Chants (pronounced "shonts") and the mascot itself is named Chauncey. When Coastal Carolina became an independent university in 1993, despite some calls for "a complete split from USC" (i.e., change the mascot), the Chanticleer remained the school's mascot. The university also has a live rooster (Chanticleer) that appears at events periodically, such as home football games. As of 2016, the live mascot is "Maddox".

In 2013, TD Bank gave CCU a $5 million gift. In September 2014, CCU officially renamed its sports facilities as the TD Sports Complex. In 2016, CCU won its first NCAA national title in baseball at the College World Series in Omaha, winning the deciding game 4–3 in the best-of-three final series against the University of Arizona. The championship was won mere hours before Coastal officially joined the Sun Belt.

The volleyball program is one of the most successful teams in the country. It won four consecutive conference championships (Big South 2014, 2015; Sun Belt 2016, 2017). Leah Hardeman ('14 -'17) is the only player in Division 1 history to win four conference player of the year awards.

The men's soccer team has won 15 regular season and 16 conference tournament championships as of 2020. They have played in 17 NCAA tournaments, reaching the Sweet 16 five times.
