= Michael T. Benson =

American academic (born 1965)

Michael Benson
- Benson in 2025

27th President of West Virginia University
- Incumbent
- Assumed office July 15, 2025
- Preceded by: E. Gordon Gee

3rd President of Coastal Carolina University
- In office January 1, 2021 – July 7, 2025
- Preceded by: David A. DeCenzo
- Succeeded by: James J. Winebrake

13th President of Eastern Kentucky University
- In office 2013–2020
- Preceded by: Charles D. Whitlock
- Succeeded by: David McFaddin

15th President of Southern Utah University
- In office 2006–2013
- Preceded by: Steven D. Bennion
- Succeeded by: Scott L. Wyatt

14th President of Snow College
- In office 2001–2006
- Preceded by: Gerald Day
- Succeeded by: Scott L. Wyatt

Personal details
- Born: Michael Taft Benson; February 28, 1965 (age 61) Salt Lake City, Utah, U.S.
- Spouse: Debi Benson
- Relations: Steve Benson (brother)
- Children: 5
- Education: Brigham Young University (BA); St Antony's College, Oxford (DPhil); University of Notre Dame (MNA); Johns Hopkins University (MLA)

Academic background
- Thesis: Sympathy or Strategy? Harry S. Truman’s Decision to Recognize the State of Israel, May 1948. (1995)
- Doctoral advisor: Noah Lucas

Academic work
- Discipline: History

Michael Taft Benson (born February 28, 1965) is an American academic administrator serving as the president and professor of history at West Virginia University. He previously served as president of Coastal Carolina University, Eastern Kentucky University, Southern Utah University, and Snow College, and as special assistant to the president at the University of Utah. He was appointed visiting professor within the Department of the History of Science and Technology at Johns Hopkins University in January 2020. On February 24, 2025, it was announced that he would become the 27th president of West Virginia University, which took effect July 15, 2025.

== Early life and education ==
Benson graduated with his bachelor's degree in 1990, cum laude, from Brigham Young University, where he was elected to Phi Kappa Phi. He then worked in Washington, D.C., for the U.S. Senate Labor and Human Resources Committee as a research assistant. Benson earned a doctorate in modern history from St Antony's College, Oxford in 1995, where he was a Rotary Foundation Ambassadorial Scholar. His dissertation committee included Daniel Walker Howe, Robert Dallek, and John Lewis Gaddis. While at Oxford, Benson served as an officer in the Oxford University L'Chaim Society, led by founder Rabbi Shmuley Boteach.

Benson also earned a master's degree cum laude in non-profit administration in 2011 from the Mendoza College of Business at the University of Notre Dame, and a master's in liberal arts in 2021 from Johns Hopkins University where he was elected to the Association of Graduate Liberal Studies Programs (AGLSP) National Honor Society. Two years after completing his degree from Notre Dame, the Mendoza College of Business recognized Benson with its Recent Alumni Service Award. In recent years, he has received national attention for his religious ecumenicism and his humorous use of social media to reach students.

Benson played JV basketball at Brigham Young University, and was a member of the Oxford University Men's Basketball Team that won the 1993–94 British University Sports Federation (BUSF) National Championship and placed second at the British University Sports Association (BUSA) National Tournament. He is also a golfer and marathon runner, having won his age division in the 1983 St. George Marathon (personal best of 2:41) and placing among the top 30% of all runners in the 1984 Boston Marathon. He was inducted into the Southern Utah University Circle of Omicron Delta Kappa in 2012.

== Career ==
=== Snow College ===
In 2001, Benson was appointed as the 14th president of Snow College. At the age of 36, he was the youngest college or university president in the history of the Utah System of Higher Education. During his tenure, Benson raised the private funds to construct the Eccles Center for the Performing Arts, made Snow an All-Steinway school, and brought Elie Wiesel to campus for a lecture and to receive an honorary degree. Benson was inducted into the Horne School of Music Hall of Fame at Snow College in December 2022.

=== Southern Utah University ===
Benson was appointed the president of Southern Utah University on November 10, 2006, by the Utah State Board of Regents. Two weeks into his presidency, Benson secured the largest donation in the school's history, which was used to expand SUU's Science Complex. He was also instrumental in gaining admission for SUU into the Big Sky Conference and landed the largest gift in the university's history from the Sorenson Legacy Foundation to help construct the Beverly Taylor Sorenson Center for the Arts. In March 2014, Benson returned to Cedar City to help celebrate the conclusion of "The Future is Rising" campaign which brought in a record $105 million in seven years for Southern Utah University.

=== Eastern Kentucky University ===
On August 1, 2013, Benson became the 12th president of Eastern Kentucky University.

In 2015, Benson worked with retired EKU archivist Charles Hay and senior Damir Siahkoohi and proposed to EKU's board of regents that Dr. Mary Roark, Eastern's “acting” president in 1909–10, be named officially as Eastern's second president. The board took this action at its February 2, 2015, meeting. Dr. Mary Roark assumed the presidency when her husband Ruric Nevel Roark died suddenly after a short illness, and was the first female to serve as president of any public college or university in the state of Kentucky. Benson thus became Eastern's 13th president.

During his six-and-a-half-year tenure at EKU, Benson oversaw nearly $300 million in capital improvements to the campus that included the largest state appropriation in the university's history ($66.5 million) for phase II of a Science complex. He also launched the most aggressive fund raising campaign ever: Make No Little Plans. Retention and graduation rates also increased as did annual fund raising totals.

On December 11, 2019, President Benson announced his resignation from Eastern Kentucky University effective January 6, 2020. He was subsequently named President Emeritus of EKU and spent 2020 researching and writing his latest book on Daniel Coit Gilman for Johns Hopkins University Press. In May 2023, Benson was inducted into the EKU Society of Foundation Professors as an honorary member in recognition of his teaching and scholarship during his service as president.

=== Coastal Carolina University ===
In October 2020, Coastal Carolina University announced the appointment of Benson as its third president and ninth leader. Benson began his tenure on January 1, 2021. He replaced David A. DeCenzo, who retired after serving for nearly 14 years as the university's president. Benson's first 100 days in office were chronicled in a series of campus-produced videos by the CCU communications team.

In August 2021, CCU welcomed its largest and best-prepared freshman class in history. The university also landed at spot #5 in Best Value School for the Southern region in the latest U.S. News & World Report rankings. In September 2021, former head football coach and CEO of TD Ameritrade, Joe Moglia, made a substantial gift to Coastal Carolina University to complete funding for a new soccer facility as well as a multi-purpose building that will constructed in the south endzone of Brooks Stadium. In May 2022, Coastal Carolina announced the largest gift in its history: $10 million from Conway Medical Center to name and endow a new College of Health and Human Performance. Funds from the gift will provide scholarships for students and also help construct an indoor practice facility on the south side of Brooks Stadium. In August 2022, the Coastal Carolina University Board of Trustees unanimously voted to extend Benson's contract as president through 2028.

An early priority of Benson's administration was working with Horry County Schools, and Horry-Georgetown Technical College (HGTC) to secure the renewal of the Horry County Penny Sales tax. In November 2022, the measure was approved with over 68% voting in support of the tax which is now in place until 2039. In recognition of his service to CCU, Horry County, and the partnership with HGTC, Benson was named Distinguished Patron of the college in May 2023. October 2024 saw the largest number of students ever enrolled at CCU — 11,225 students — along with a record retention rate. Recently completed facilities include a new soccer complex and Thompson Library. Just prior to his departure, Benson oversaw the ribbon cutting on a brand new 93,000 square foot indoor practice facility, considered to be one of the best among the current Group of Six schools.

In late 2024, Benson led the completion of CCU Reach, the university's strategic plan as well as a campus master plan featuring the following projects: a new Center for Health and Human Performance, to be named the Moglia Center; a pedestrian overpass which will span across state Highway 544; an expansion of the Lib Jackson Student Union; a new PGM Academic Facility and Clubhouse at the Hackler Golf Course; and a proposed Convocation Center on the corner of state Highway 501 and University Boulevard (with a Phase II addition of a Center for the Arts).

On February 21, 2025, local Myrtle Beach news outlets published a story stating the Benson would be leaving CCU to become president of West Virginia University. He was replaced by James J. Winebrake on July 7, 2025.

=== West Virginia University ===
On July 15, 2025, Benson officially began his presidency at West Virginia University. Benson based his decision to come to WVU on the opportunity to lead an R1 (very high research activity) university, a renowned academic medical center.

He promised to become acquainted with the state of West Virginia and its people by visiting all 55 counties within his first year on the job. Not even three months into the role, Benson passed the halfway point, touching through 28 counties as of September 26, 2025.

Benson has tapped into local WVU and Morgantown traditions and landmarks early on: In September 2025, he announced Hope Gas would sponsor improvements for the iconic WVU Water Tower on the Evansdale area of campus. Additions to the Tower will include the installation of LED lighting — designed by City Neon — around the Flying WV logo. Weeks later, Benson announced during his first State of the university address that the iconic Woodburn Hall would be relit for the holidays, a years-long tradition that stopped around 2015.

In that same address, Benson revealed that WVU earning membership in the prestigious Association of American Universities would be one of the primary goals of his presidency. “I believe WVU belongs in the group of 71 universities that are on the leading edge of innovation, scholarship, and solutions that contribute to scientific progress, economic development, security, and well-being,” Benson said. “This will be a challenge, but it’s one we can take on together as Mountaineers."

In November 2025, Benson unveiled his Strategic Compass, which includes five priorities — education, discovery, health, service, and experiences — with foundational areas to accelerate institutional success in people and culture, finance, core infrastructure, and institutional reputation.

In June 2026, WVU entered into a unique partnership with Johns Hopkins University after JHU President Ron Daniels visited the Morgantown campus and expressed interest in Hopkins and WVU faculty engaging in joint research projects. With an investment from Johns Hopkins of $5 million, and an additional $2 million from WVU, President Daniels told the WVU Board of Governors: “To be able to do this with an outstanding public institution in a red state from the perspective of a private institution in a blue state at this point in America adds another exciting dimension to our work together.”

Benson has stated his intent to recruit top-flight talent to WVU to fill key senior leadership positions, stating in July 2025 that a new provost and vice president of academic affairs would be his most important hire during his tenure as president. In January 2026, Benson recruited Beverly Wendland, former provost at Washington University in St. Louis and former dean at Johns Hopkins University, to WVU as the new provost. In April, it was announced that Chris Kaboreuk, former interim president of the University of Nebraska-Lincoln, and former CFO at both Nebraska and The Ohio State University, would join Benson’s team as WVU’s Chief Financial Officer in June 2026. Kaboreuk then led the search for a new Chief Information Officer and landed Kimberly Clark, formerly of Charles Schwab and Twitter and most recently the deputy CIO and chief digital transformation officer at Arizona State University. Clark begins her tenure at WVU in October 2026.

Further enhancing the research profile of WVU has been a top priority for Benson since his arrival. In July 2026, WVU was named a recipient of its largest federal award in history: a $160 million Engines grant from the National Science Foundation. In addition to the federal monies, an additional $161 million was raised by RETI (Resilient Energy Technology Infrastructure) CEO Erienne Olesh and her team. WVU is the principal investigator and its two co-principal investigators are Carnegie Mellon University and the University of Pittsburgh.

On September 11, 2026, the WVU Board of Governors voted unanimously to extend Benson’s contract two years through July 31, 2032.

== Other appointments ==
In 2009, Governor Jon Huntsman Jr. named Benson to a four-year term as member of the seven-person Utah Appellate Courts Nominating Commission. Benson served as Chair of the Presidents’ Council for the Summit League, SUU's Division I athletic conference. Benson also served on the advisory board of the Cedar City Airport. Benson has completed a two-year term as the chair of the executive committee of the Utah State Campus Compact. He is a past member of the Zions Bank Central Utah Board of Advisors, and the Wells Fargo Southwest Utah Board of Advisors. He has been employed in many other capacities, including: Associate Director of Major Gifts (University of Utah), Consulting Historian (Harry S. Truman Library), Academic Advisor and Essayist (Skirball Cultural Center), Visiting Lecturer (Brigham Young University, University of Utah), and Professor (adjunct) at the Mendoza College of Business at the University of Notre Dame.

Benson served as Chair of the NCAA Honors Committee and Chair of the Presidents' Council for the Ohio Valley Conference and on the NCAA Division I Presidential Forum. In October 2021, Benson was appointed to the NCAA Board of Governors Committee to Promote Cultural Diversity and Equity as the FBS presidential representative. He is also a former chair of the Higher Education Consortium for Bluegrass Tomorrow and a member of the Steering Committee of Kentucky Rising. He currently serves on the executive committee of the Northeastern Strategic Alliance (NESA) based in Florence, South Carolina; on the Advocacy Council of the Myrtle Beach Area Chamber of Commerce; on the Conway advisory board of Coastal Carolina National Bank; on the executive committee of the Myrtle Beach Regional Economic Development Corporation; and on the Myrtle Beach Chamber of Commerce Board of Directors. In May 2021, Benson was elected to the board of trustees for the Omicron Delta Kappa Society (ODK) and Educational Foundation, Inc., and served as chair in 2025.

In December 2024, Benson was elected to the SACSCOC Board of Directors (the South Carolina delegation) to serve a three-year term. Benson is currently a member of the Council of Presidents for the Association of Governing Boards of Universities and Colleges (AGB) and served on the regional executive council for the American Red Cross of South Carolina.

In June 2026, Benson was named to the Advisory Council of the Mountaineer Council for Scouting America. He also serves on the Executive Committee for the Big 12 Athletic Conference as Secretary/Treasurer.

== Publications ==
Benson is the author of Harry S. Truman and the Founding of Israel and, with co-author Hal Boyd, published College for the Commonwealth: A Case for Higher Education in American Democracy with the University Press of Kentucky (2018). The volume expands the arguments of Benson and Boyd's article, "The Public University: The Democratic Purpose of Higher Education." Their work was nominated for the University of Louisville 2020 Grawemeyer Award in Education.

Benson's third book was released in 2022 by Johns Hopkins University Press. Titled Daniel Coit Gilman and the Birth of the American Research University, this work recounts the life of Johns Hopkins University's first president, Daniel Coit Gilman, and the establishment of America's first research university in Baltimore in 1876. Benson delivered the keynote address at the annual Johns Hopkins Master of Liberal Arts Colloquium in May 2021, focusing on his Gilman research and writing, and was invited back to campus for Alumni weekend in 2023 and interviewed by Hopkins president Ron Daniels as part of the JHU Press “Meet the Author” series. In December 2023, the Gilman title was named among the best education books of the year by Forbes.

Benson is regularly sought after for public speeches and appearances. He was a featured contributor to the Huffington Post for five years; has written articles for the Jerusalem Post, Lexington Herald-Leader, the Louisville Courier Journal, the Kansas City Star, the Deseret News, and the Salt Lake Tribune, among others; and appeared on ESPN's Paul Finebaum Show.

In recognition of his achievement in writing, the University of Notre Dame Alumni Association presented Benson with the Rev. Robert C Griffin, CSC, Award in April 2026. Established over 20 years ago, the award recognizes alumni who have contributed through their written works such as Nicholas Sparks (2004) and Mark Shields (posthumously in 2025).

== Personal life ==
Benson and his first wife, Celia Barnes, divorced in 2004. They are the parents of two children, Emma and Samuel. Emma is the medical specialist for KSL-TV in Salt Lake City, Utah. Samuel is a writer for Politico in Washington, D.C. and his wife, Keylia, is a second-year law student at Georgetown University.

Benson and his wife, Debi, are the parents of three children: Truman, a sophomore soccer player at Salt Lake Community College; Tatum, a freshman at Auburn University; and Talmage, a scratch golfer and member of the Myrtle Beach High School golf team.

Benson is a grandson of former U.S. Secretary of Agriculture and president of the Church of Jesus Christ of Latter-Day Saints Ezra Taft Benson. He served a mission in Rome, Italy for the Church of Jesus Christ of Latter-Day Saints. His older brother Steve Benson was a Pulitzer Prize winning editorial cartoonist.

== See also ==
- List of leaders of Coastal Carolina University
