= Scott L. Wyatt =

American politician

16th President of Southern Utah University
- In office 2013–2021
- Preceded by: Michael T. Benson
- Succeeded by: Mindy Benson

15th President of Snow College
- In office 2007–2013
- Preceded by: Michael T. Benson
- Succeeded by: Gary Carlston

Member of the Utah House of Representatives from the 5th district
- In office 2005–2007

Personal details
- Party: Republican
- Education: Utah State University (BS); University of Utah (JD)

Scott L. Wyatt is an American attorney, politician, and academic administrator serving as the 16th president of Southern Utah University. He previously served as the 15th president of Snow College and as a member of the Utah State Legislature.

== Education ==
Wyatt has a Bachelor of Science degree in philosophy and economics from Utah State University and a Juris Doctor from the S.J. Quinney College of Law at the University of Utah. Wyatt was admitted to the Utah bar 2 October 1990.

== Career ==
During his law career, Wyatt served as a prosecutor and the County Attorney for Cache County, Utah. From 2005 to 2007, Wyatt was a member of the Utah House of Representatives from 2005 to 2007, representing the 5th district. During his tenure in the House, Wyatt was a member of the House Political Subdivisions Committee, Judiciary Committee, House Business and Labor Committee, and Higher Education Appropriations Subcommittee. Wyatt was the president of Snow College from 2007 to 2013. Wyatt served as the president of Southern Utah University from 2013 to 2021.
