= Southern Utah University =

Public university in Cedar City, Utah, US

- Former name: List: Branch Normal School (1897–1913); Branch Agricultural College (1913–1953); College of Southern Utah (1953–1969); Southern Utah State College (1969–1990)
- Motto: Learning Lives Forever
- Type: Public university
- Established: 1897; 129 years ago
- Parent institution: Utah System of Higher Education
- Accreditation: NWCCU
- Endowment: $45.9 million (2025)
- President: Mindy Benson
- Faculty: 282
- Students: 15,444 (fall 2024)
- Undergraduates: 13,126 (fall 2024)
- Postgraduates: 2,318 (fall 2024)
- Location: Cedar City, Utah, United States; 37°40′32″N 113°04′18″W
- Campus: College town, 129 acres (0.52 km^{2})
- Colors: Red and white
- Nickname: Thunderbirds
- Sporting affiliations: NCAA Division I FCS — WAC; UAC
- Website: suu.edu
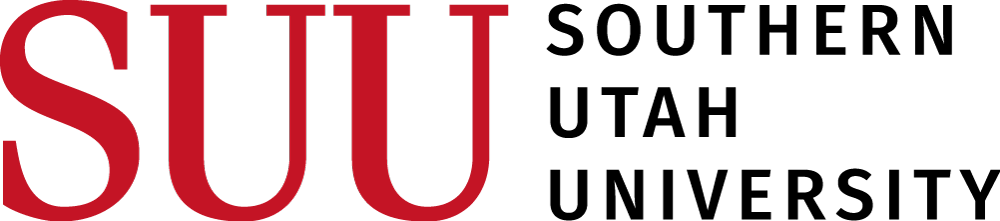

Southern Utah University (SUU) is a public university in Cedar City, Utah, United States. Founded in 1897 as a normal school, Southern Utah University now has over 1,800 graduates each year with baccalaureate and other graduate degrees from its six colleges. SUU offers more than 140 undergraduate and 19 graduate programs. More than 15,000 students attend SUU.

SUU's 17 athletic teams compete in Division I of the NCAA and are collectively known as the Thunderbirds. SUU joined the Western Athletic Conference in July 2022.

Southern Utah University alumni include U.S. governors, members of the United States Congress, Olympians, athletes in the NFL, Golden Globe and Academy Award Winners.

== History ==
=== Branch Normal School ===
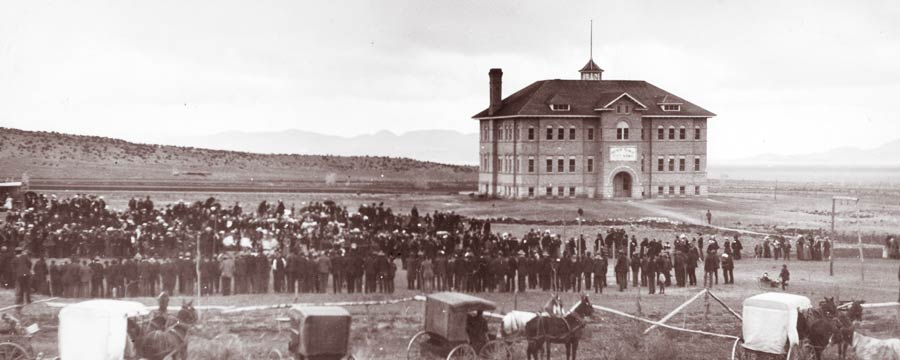
Dedication of the SUU Old Main, September 1898

In the spring of 1897, Cedar City was notified it had been chosen as the site for a branch of the state's normal school (which was a part of the University of Utah). Known as the "Branch Normal School," it became the first teacher training school in southern Utah. For the next three months, citizens labored to complete Ward Hall on Main Street for the first school year. In September, the school opened its doors.

From January through July they continued their labors and when September 1898 arrived, Old Main was nearly completed. It had a large chapel for religious assemblies, a library and reading room, a natural history museum, biological and physical laboratories, classrooms, and offices.

Milton Bennion was first principal for the Branch Normal School (BNS). Bennion brought a code of integrity to the students of BNS. He established a self-governing student body. Bennion directed 161 students during his time as principal.

The BNS started classes with four teachers, now known as the Founding Four. Bennion, who acted as principal, taught history, geography, and physiology classes during his three-year tenure before he left in 1900 to teach at the University of Utah. Howard R. Driggs acted as the first English professor at BNS until 1905. During his career, Driggs was both a professor of English education and a historian of the American West. SUU still honors his name with the Howard R. Driggs Collection located in the Gerald R. Sherratt Library and plays host to semi-annual lectures by national scholars. The third, George W. Decker, was a southern Utah native and was adamant about teaching from the student's point of view rather from a book. Students loved him so much that a request by the student body to proper authorities was the turning point leading to his appointment as the fourth principal of BNS. Annie Elizabeth Spencer Milne was also on the original BNS staff. She taught physical education and started the school's first basketball team.

Porter remained BNS principal until 1904, when George W. Decker took the position. Decker was among the first four faculty members at BNS and also the first southern Utah native to take the position. He served the school for 16 years, seven on the faculty and nine as principal before he was elected to the office of state representative.

=== Branch Agriculture College ===
Roy F. Homer became principal in 1913 and ushered BNS into the next stage as the "Branch Agricultural College" (BAC). BAC was a branch school of the Utah State Agriculture College (now Utah State University). BAC received its third building in 1927 as the Women's Gymnasium—now known as the Hunter Conference Center. It was then that ties were created between the school and Zion National Park that are still intact, raising the quality of classes, increasing enrollment, and creating the school's first Greek societies.

=== College of Southern Utah ===
In 1951, Daryl Chase became president and was responsible for the schools heightened vision and name change to the "College of Southern Utah" (CSU). The next college president was Royden C. Braithwaite, who took office in 1955. During his tenure, CSU campus almost doubled in acreage. Of the 28 structures on campus at the time of his death in 1991, very few had not been built or renovated under his direction. He oversaw the construction of the Library (now the Auditorium) in 1955, the Science Building (now the General Classroom Building) in 1961, the Music Center in 1967, and an additional Library (now the Electronic Learning Center) in 1969.

A monumental addition to the College of Southern Utah was the birth of the Utah Shakespeare Festival in 1961 by Fred C. Adams. In its first season it attracted 3,276 visitors and in 2012 it reached 130,000.

=== Southern Utah State College ===
In 1969, Braithwaite oversaw the school's name change to "Southern Utah State College". He also coined the school's motto “Learning Lives Forever” and student enrollment grew from 360 to 2000. Orville D. Carnahan took over in 1978; during his three-year tenure he led the institution in an expansion of academic offerings.

The largest expansion of growth happened under the direction of Gerald R. Sherratt who was president from 1982 until 1997. During his time he oversaw the creation of the Business Building in 1982 and the Centrum in 1985.

=== Southern Utah University ===
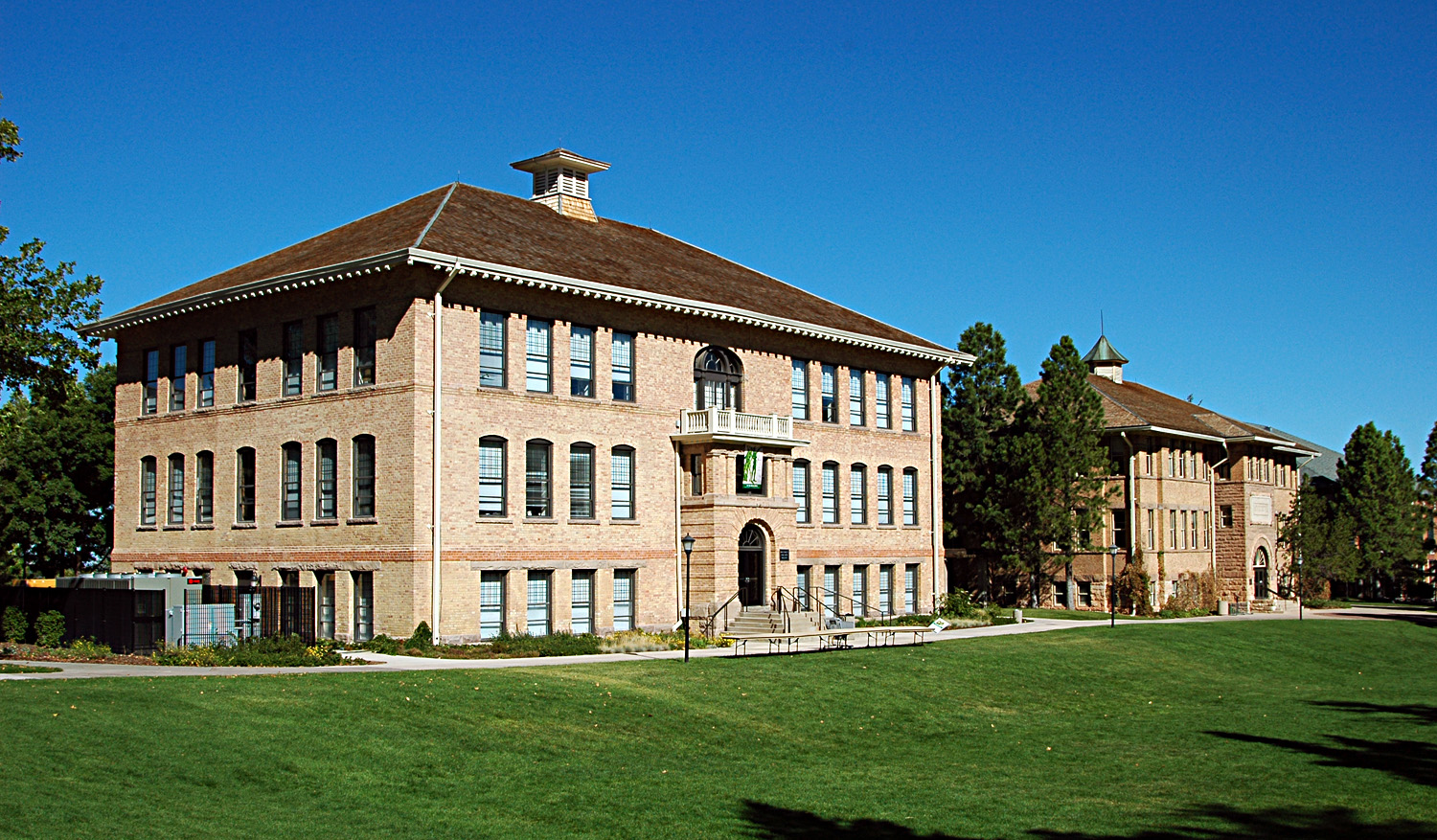
The second oldest building on campus, the Braithwaite Liberal Arts Center (left), was built in 1899, and the oldest building on campus, Old Main (right), built in 1898. Part of the R. Haze Hunter Conference Center, dedicated in the 1920s, can be seen on the far right

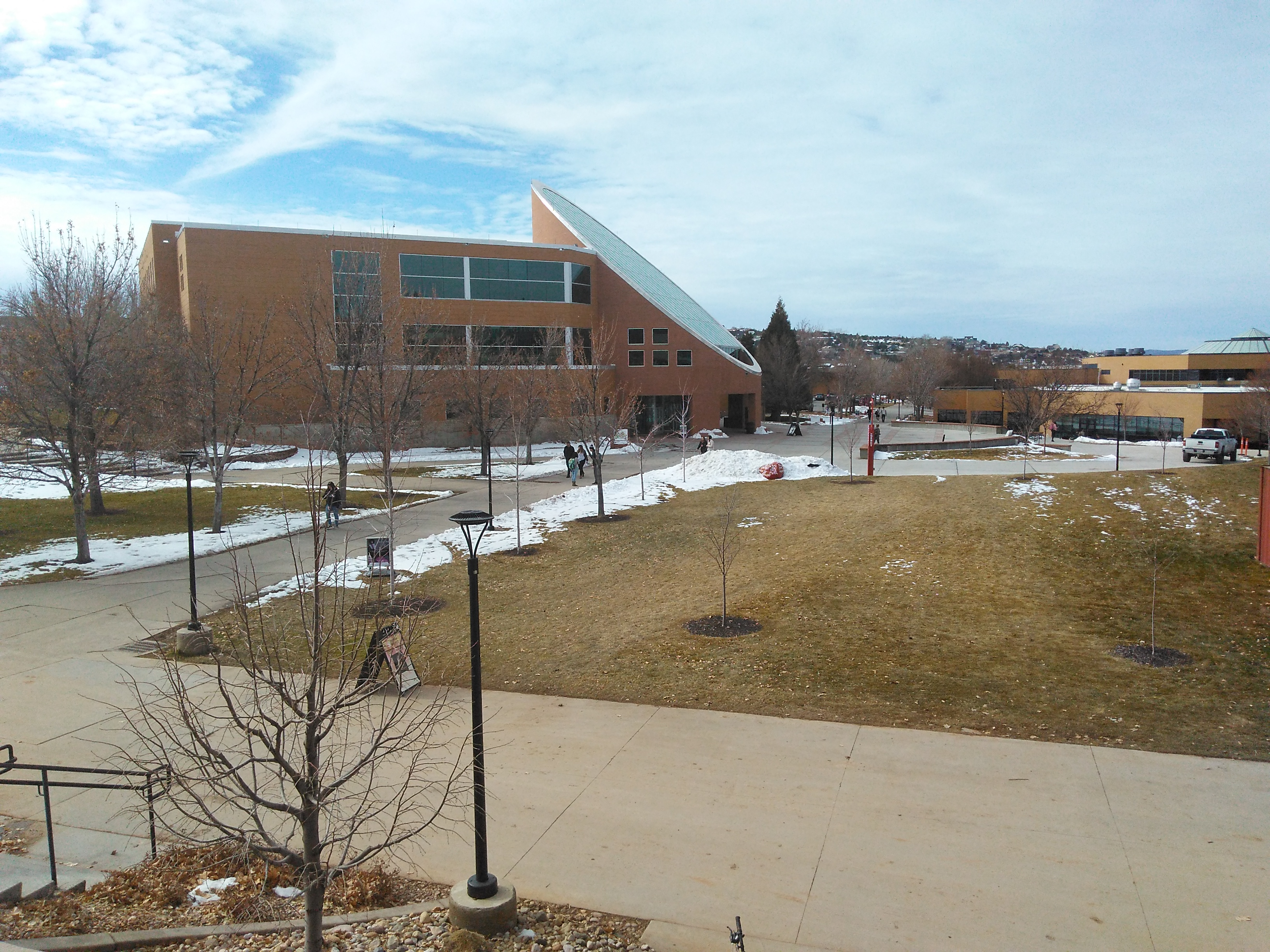
Southern Utah University

On February 14, 1990, the Utah State Legislature signed into law a bill to change the name of Southern Utah State College to Southern Utah University, with an effective date of January 1, 1991. Upon reaching university status, President Sherratt was able to receive funding to construct 14 other buildings during his tenure. Sherratt also helped with the launching of the Utah Summer Games and the athletic program achieving NCAA Division I status.

Michael T. Benson became president in 2007. Benson received his master's degree from Notre Dame and his doctorate from University of Oxford. During his time as president, he championed the most ambitious fundraising campaign in SUU history, raising more than $90 million of the $100 million goal, including the three largest donations in SUU history. He also oversaw the construction of the new Science Center, Cedar Hall, and the Carter Carillon. President Benson heightened academic standards and increased resources for instruction, significantly raised retention rates, and realigned SUU Athletics in the Big Sky Conference. In 2011, the Board of Higher Education (then the Board of Regents) approved Southern Utah University’s mission change and designation as Utah’s designated public liberal arts and sciences university. President Benson concluded his tenure at SUU and Scott L. Wyatt succeeded him in November 2013. Between 2013 and 2014 Wyatt finalized an unprecedented funding campaign, ending in the groundbreaking of the Beverly Taylor Sorensen Center for the Arts in March 2014. He would also go on to launch a 3-year bachelor's degree program in 2020. In March 2020, during the COVID-19 pandemic, SUU shifted almost completely to remote learning for the remainder of the fall and summer 2020 semesters along with the other public universities in Utah. After Wyatt accepted a position in the Utah System of Higher Education Office of the Commissioner, Mindy Benson was named interim president in August 2021. Benson went on to be named the 17th president, the institution's first female president.

== Administration ==
Since 1969, three administrative bodies have governed SUU: the President's Council, the Board of Trustees, and ultimately the Utah Boards of Regents. The President's Council consists of eight top SUU administrators. These groups convene regularly to discuss issues of top importance to the university and help advise the president on executive decisions. The Board of Trustees, created by the Higher Education Act of 1969, is an integral part of the Utah System of Higher Education. The Board of Trustees help facilitate communication between the institution and community, strengthen alumni traditions and goals, select recipient of honorary degrees, and implement and execute fundraising and developmental projects. The Utah Board of Regents is composed of 20 Utah residents, appointed by the governor for six-year terms, and oversees all institutes of higher education in the state of Utah.

== Academics ==
The university awards associate, bachelor's, and master's degrees organized into four colleges and two schools. A combined total of 140 bachelor's degree programs are offered along with 19 master's degree programs. The university also offers a Doctorate of Clinical Psychology (Psy.D.) focused on clinical practices rather than research.

== Performing and visual arts ==
SUU has a large number of performing and visual arts opportunities for students and the local community. Students perform more than 250 performances each year and vocal students have won many competitions of the National Opera Association and the National Association of Teachers of Singers.

The Department of Music is accredited by the National Association of Schools of Music and offers SUU students a wide array of musical opportunities. The Department of Theatre Arts and Dance offers two types of degrees and is closely connected with the Utah Shakespeare Festival, which is housed at SUU.

== Student life ==
Undergraduate demographics as of Fall 2023
Race and ethnicity	Total
White	68%
Hispanic	10%
Unknown	7%
International student	5%
Black	3%
American Indian/Alaska Native	2%
Asian	2%
Native Hawaiian/Pacific Islander	2%
Two or more races	1%
Economic diversity
Low-income (Note: The percentage of students who received an income-based federal Pell grant intended for low-income students.)	34%
Affluent (Note: The percentage of students who are a part of the American middle class at the bare minimum.)	66%

The Michael O. Leavitt Center for Politics and Public Service, named after Michael O. Leavitt, is housed at the university.

There are three student-run media outlets at SUU: the monthly campus newspaper, University Journal; KSUU 91.1 FM (Thunder 91), an FM radio station; and SUTV-9 cable television.

=== Utah Shakespeare Festival ===
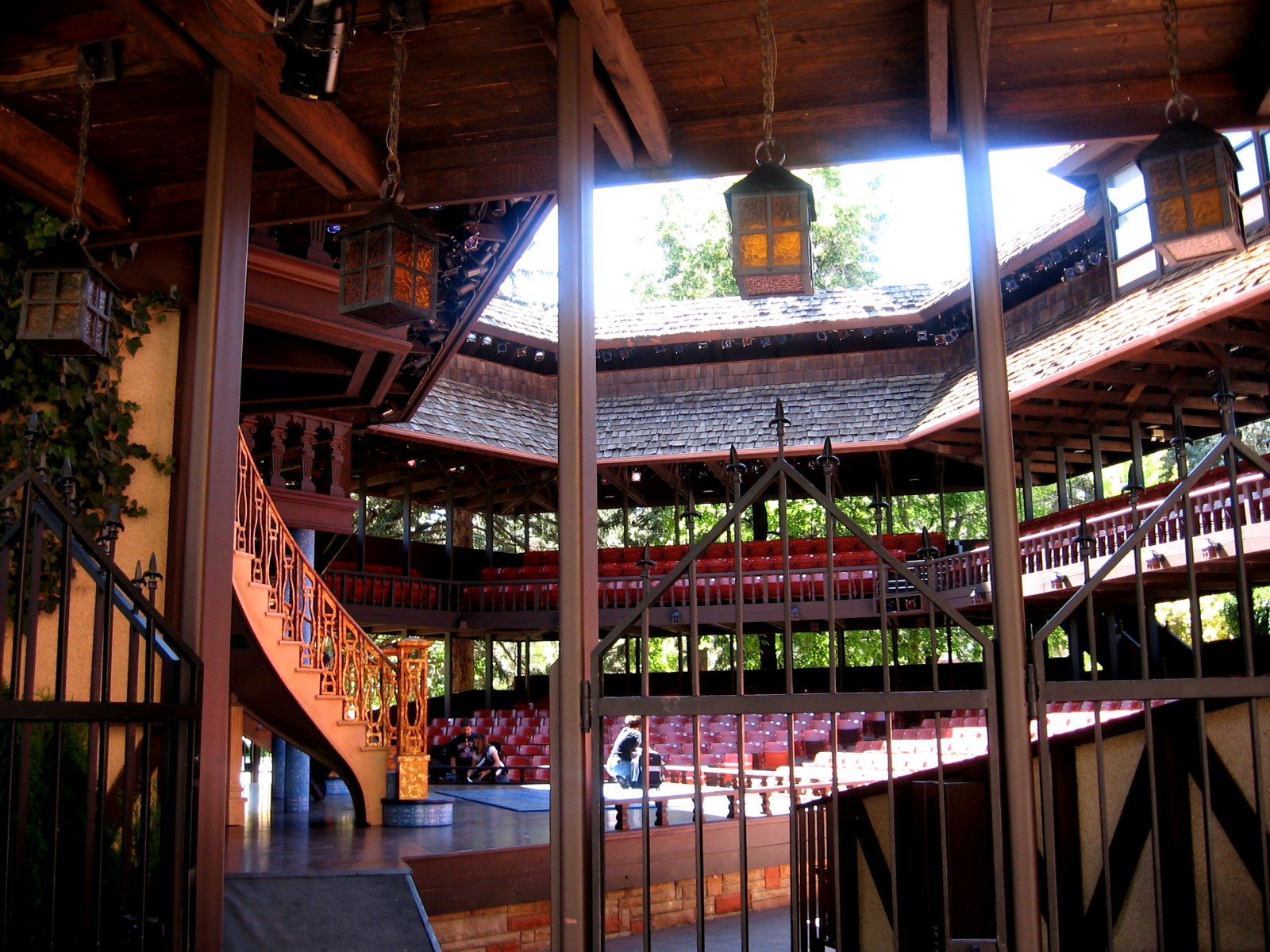
Fred C. Adams Theatre on SUU's campus

The Shakespeare Festival, which is housed on SUU's campus, was founded by Fred C. Adams in 1961 and presented its first season in 1962, bringing in 3,276 spectators. The initial two-week season yielded $2,000 and demonstrated the cooperative relationship between SUU and the community. In 2003, nearly 150,000 ticket-holders viewed 246 performances in three theaters during a sixteen-week season. The Festival is now a year-round operation with a full-time staff of 26 and now an outgoing educational outreach program, including workshops and a touring version of one of the plays.

=== Utah Summer Games ===
In 1986, President Gerald R. Sherratt was inspired by the 1984 Summer Olympics in Los Angeles and, with the help of the local community, the first Utah Summer Games commenced. After more than 25 years, the Utah Summer Games brings in more than 10,000 athletes as young as three from the surrounding region in nearly 40 different Olympic-style competitions. Competitions include volleyball, water polo, tennis, archery, gymnastics, and basketball.

The 38th annual Larry. H. Miller Utah Summer Games were held at Southern Utah University in 2023.

=== Intramural sports ===
Intramural sports are a large aspect of student life for Thunderbirds. More than 3,300 students participate each year. From badminton to pickleball to rugby, students have a long list of intramural sports to choose from that run the entire school year, with tournaments and events for each sport.

=== Outdoor recreation ===
SUU's, nicknamed the "University of the Parks," location in the southeast Great Basin about 20 miles (32 km) north of the northeastern edge of the Mojave Desert gives it a cooler and less arid climate compared to the nearby southern Utah "Dixie" region only 45 minutes south. With 13 national and state parks near SUU's campus outdoor recreation is a popular student activity, with many participating in rock climbing, hiking, backpacking, camping, mountain biking and boating in the surrounding red cliffs. SUU is a 60-minute drive from Zion National Park, 90-minute drive from Bryce Canyon National Park and only a 30-minute drive to Kolob Canyons.

== Athletics ==
Southern Utah Thunderbirds have a rich history of competing against college teams throughout the country and in the State of Utah. Most teams compete in the Western Athletic Conference; football competes in the NCAA Football Championship Subdivision (FCS, formerly known as Division I-AA) in the football-only United Athletic Conference. When the Thunderbirds entered the Big Sky Conference in 2012 they discontinued baseball and established men's and women's tennis in its place. In the summer of 2020, SUU discontinued tennis. The SUU gymnastics team competes within the Mountain Pacific Sports Federation (MRGC). The Thunderbirds have thirteen athletic programs. The Thunderbirds will rejoin the Big Sky Conference starting in 2026 after a four-year absence.

The Thunderbirds compete in:

- Football
- Gymnastics
- Basketball
- Cross Country
- Golf
- Soccer
- Softball
- Track and Field
- Volleyball
- Tennis

== Notable alumni ==
- James Cowser, professional football player
- Ricardo Dominguez, Electronic Disturbance Theater, University of California, San Diego
- Hikari, award-winning film and television director
- Dave Houle, high school football coach, Mountain View High School; National Coaches Hall of Fame, US record 68 state championships
- Peter M. Johnson, First African-American general authority and member of the first quorum of the seventy for the Church of Jesus Christ of Latter-day Saints
- Miles Killebrew, professional football player, NFL's Detroit Lions
- Michael O. Leavitt, 14th Governor of Utah and Secretary of Health and Human Services in the George W. Bush cabinet
- Cameron Levins, 2012 NCAA Track and Field Champion in the 5 and 10k, 2012, 2020 and 2024 Olympian, 2012 Bowerman Award winner
- DeWayne Lewis, professional football player, NFL
- Lonnie Mayne, professional wrestler in the 1960s and 1970s; NWA United States Heavyweight Champion
- Nick Miller, professional football player, NFL's Oakland Raiders
- Celeste Maloy, U.S. Representative
- Sean O'Connell, professional Mixed Martial Artist
- Tysson Poots, professional football player
- Harry Reid, U.S. Senate Majority Leader (2007–2015)
- Keala Settle, singer/actress, Broadway, The Greatest Showman feature film
- LeShaun Sims, professional football player, NFL's Tennessee Titans
- Brad Sorensen, professional football player
- Jill Stevens, Miss SUU 2006, Miss Davis County 2007, Miss Utah 2007, Miss America 2008 "People's Choice" semifinalist

== Gallery ==
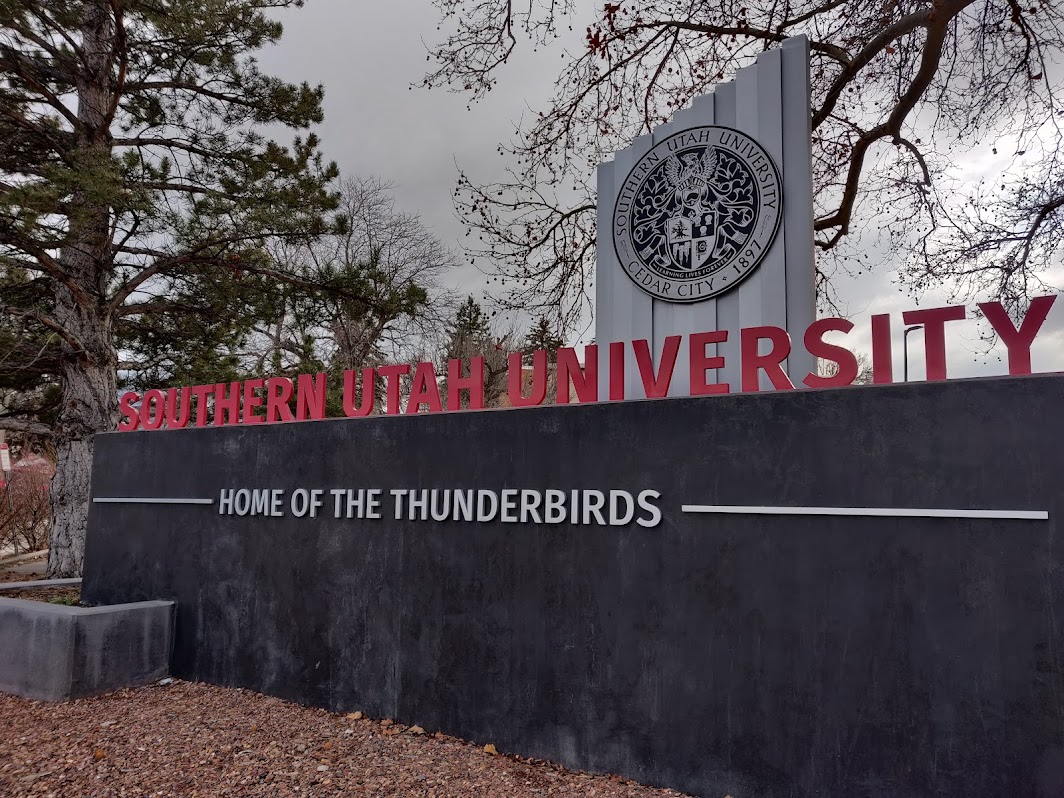
Southern Utah University Main Sign1

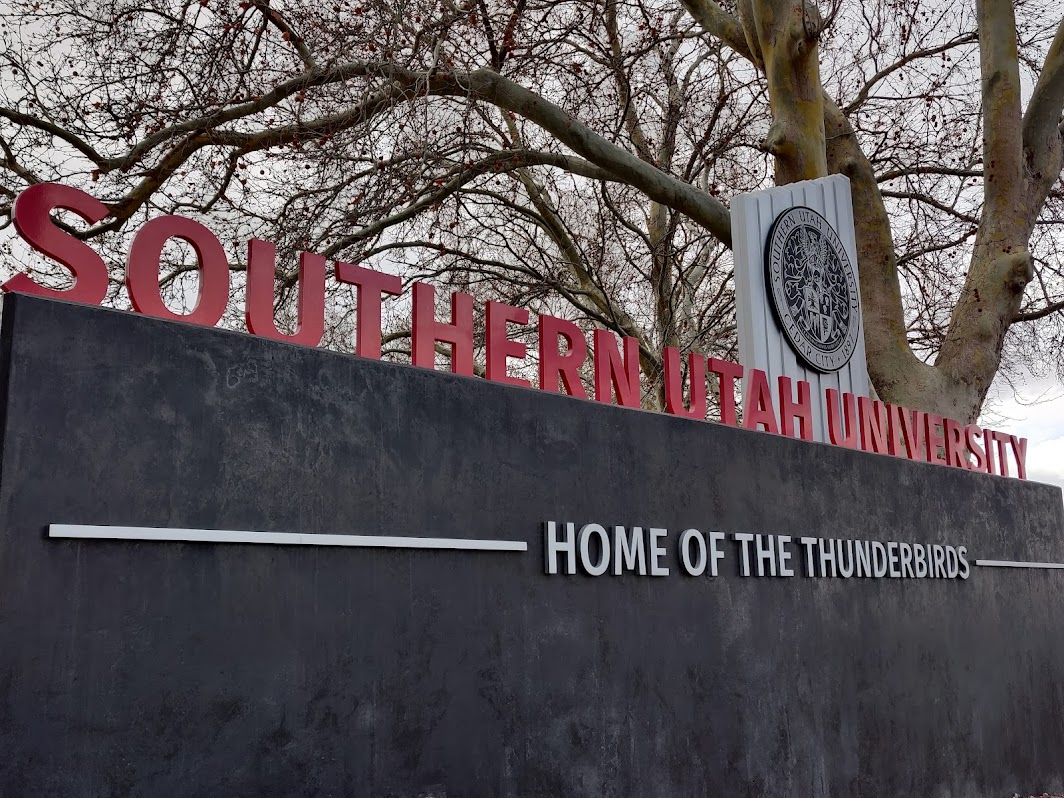
Southern Utah University Main Sign2

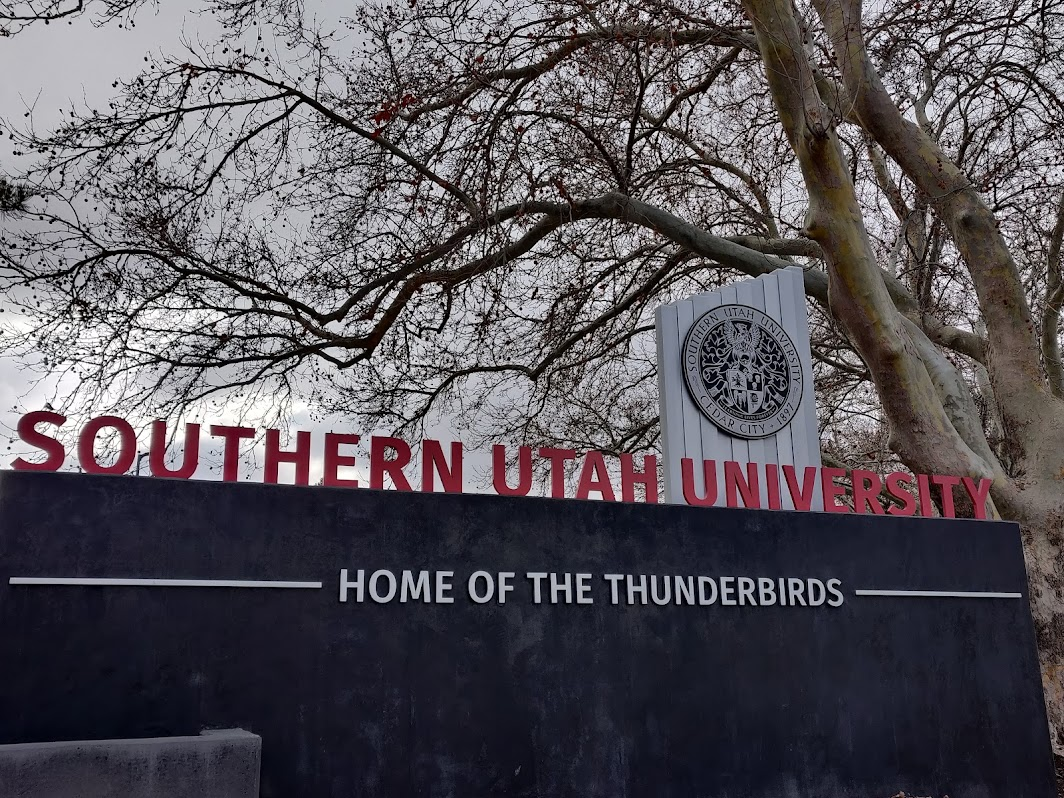
Southern Utah University Main Sign3

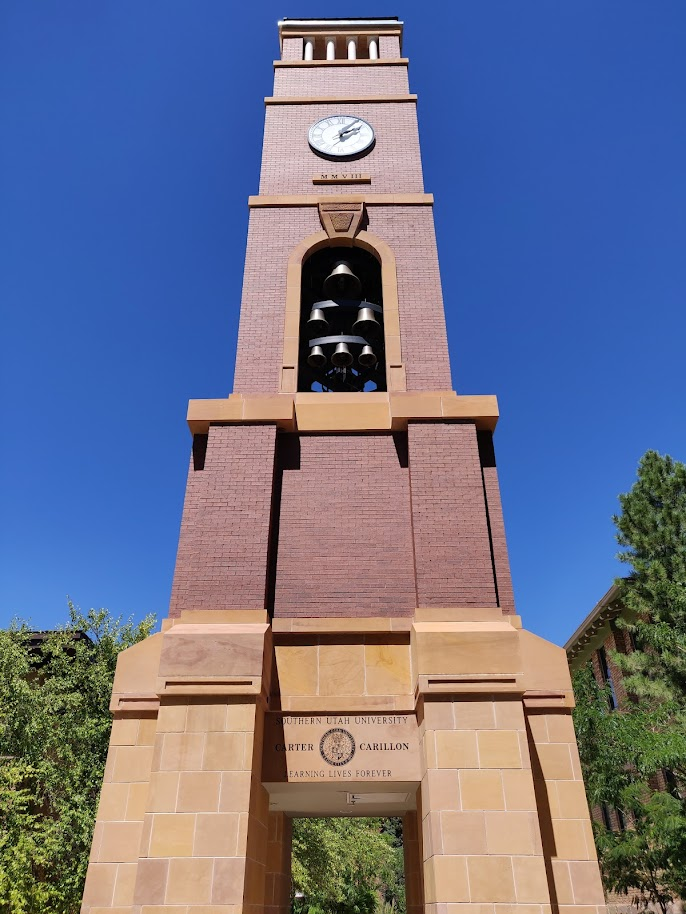
SUU Bell Tower

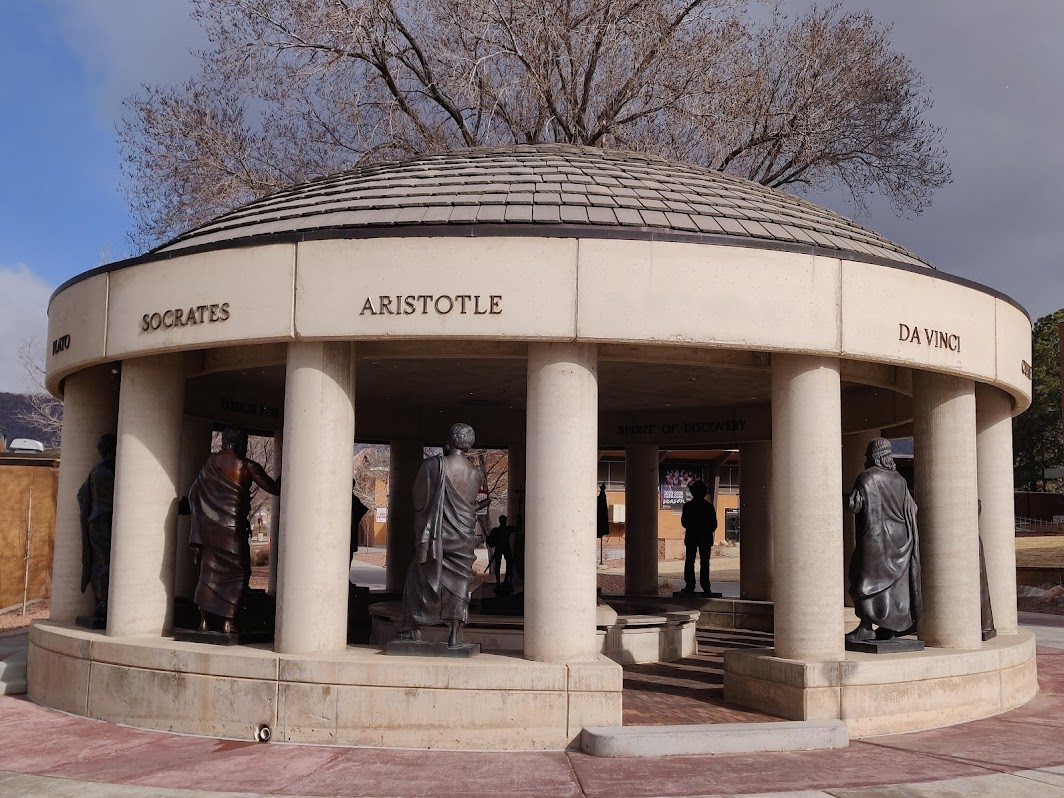
SUU Centurium

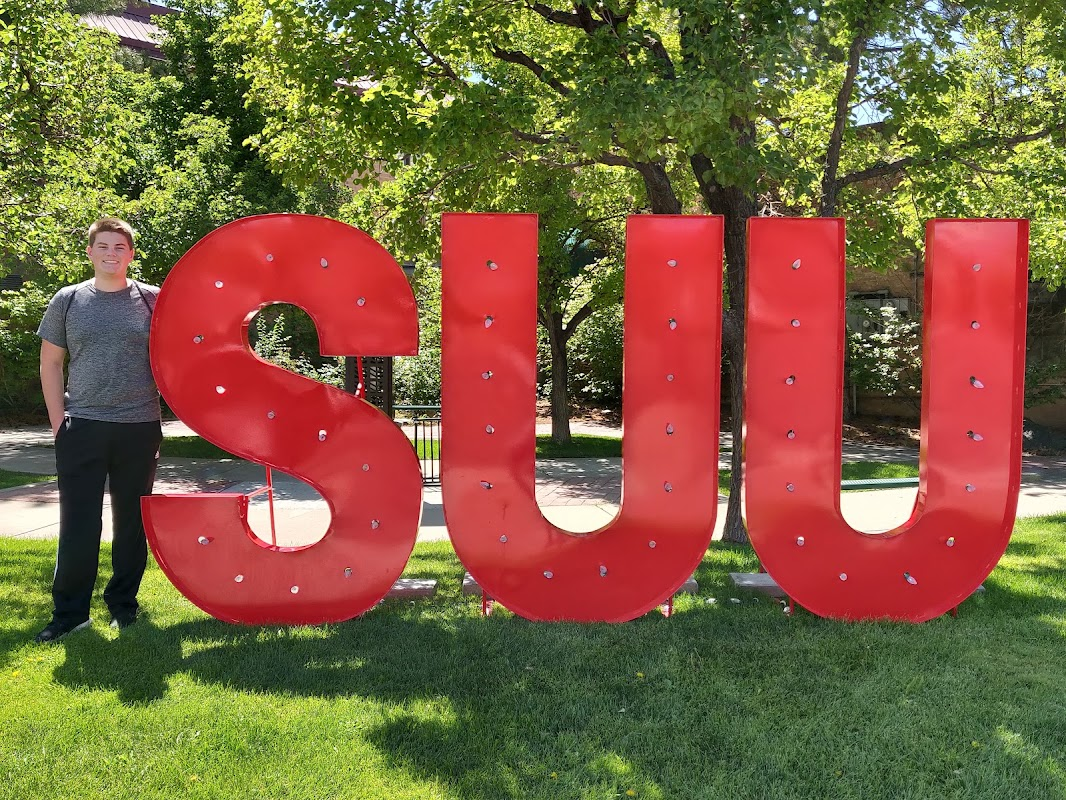
SUU Sign

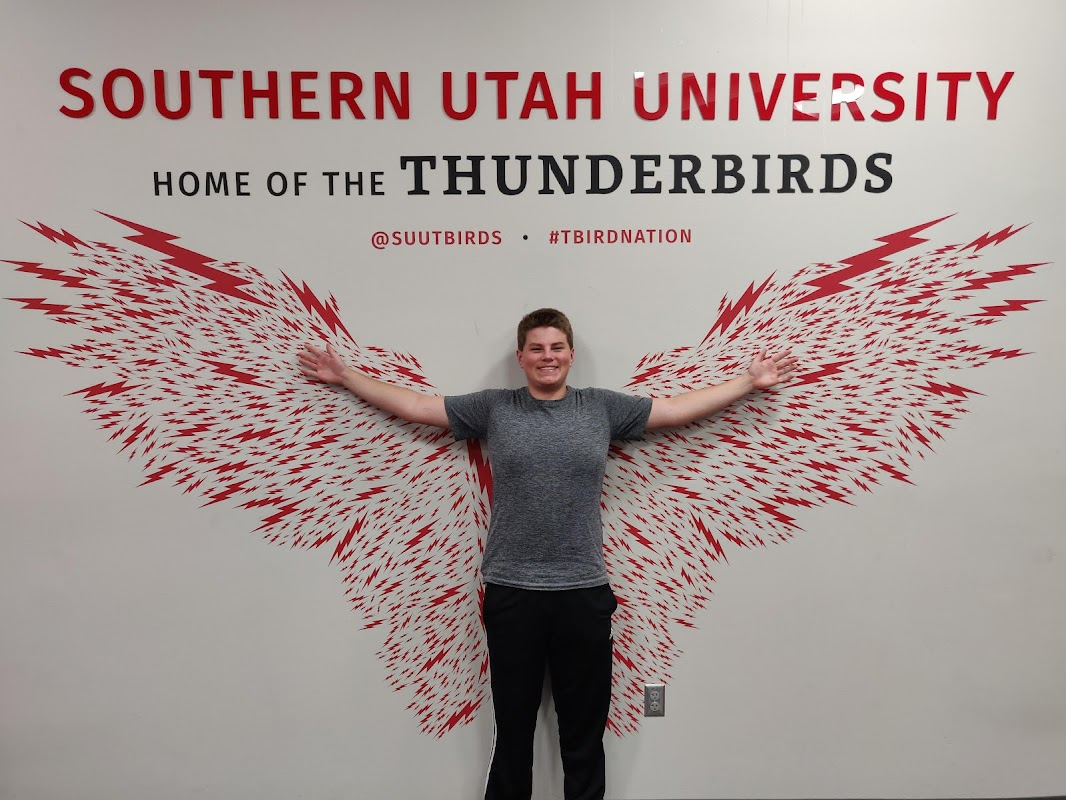
SUU Thunderbirds Wings

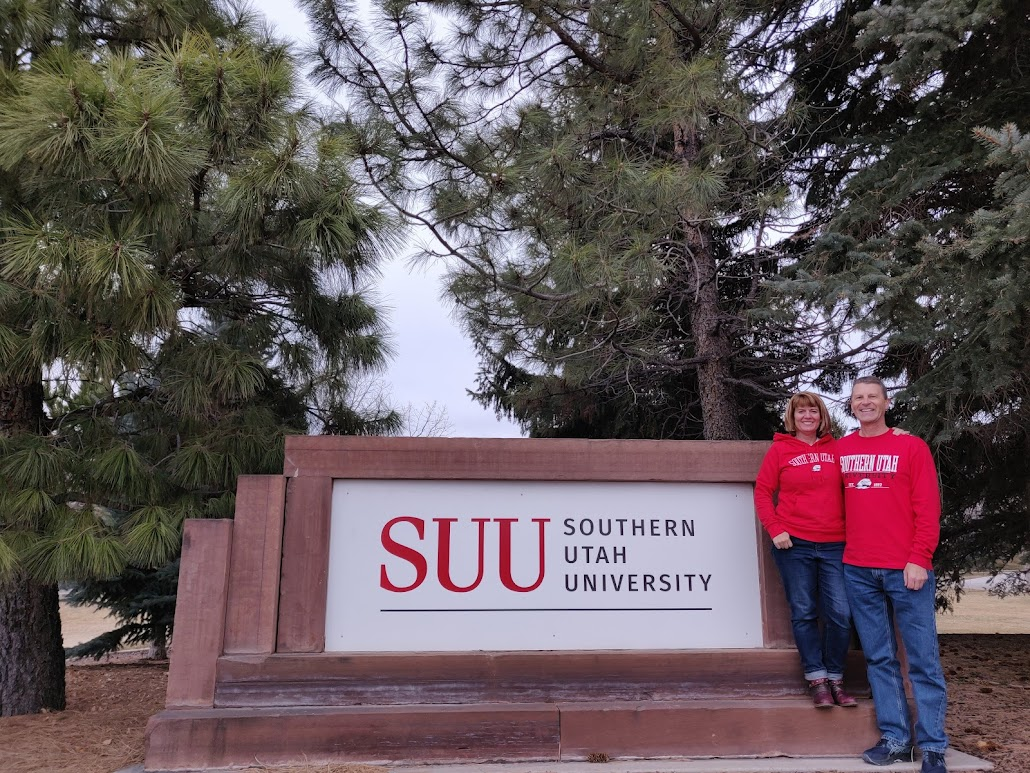
SUU Logo Sign
