= Saga of the Sanpitch =

- Categories: Western U.S. History
- Frequency: Annual
- Publisher: Sanpete Historical Writing Committee
- First issue: 1969
- Final issue: 1998
- Country: United States
- Language: English
- Website: http://content.lib.utah.edu/cdm4/browse.php?CISOROOT=/snow-sandpitch&CISOSTART=1,1
- OCLC: 18658969

The Saga of the Sanpitch was a collection of biographical short stories, published annually from 1969 to 1998, about early Scandinavian immigrants to the Sanpete Valley.
