= Inlet Square Mall =

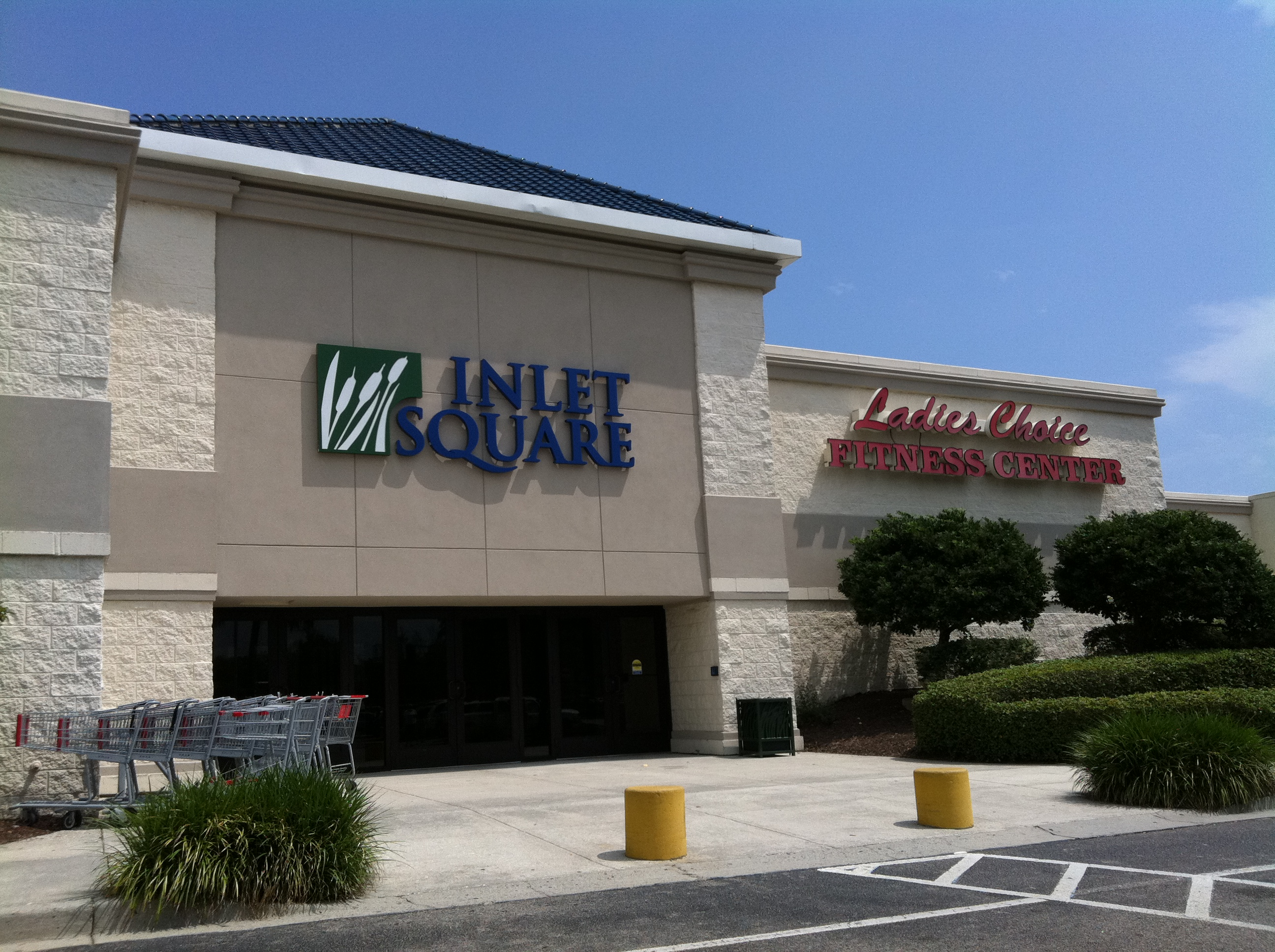
- Entrance to Inlet Square Mall, August 2011
- Location: Garden City, South Carolina, United States
- Coordinates: 33°34′51″N 79°1′32″W
- Address: 10125 Hwy 17 Bypass; Murrells Inlet, SC 29576
- Opened: March 1990; 36 years ago
- Closed: January 15, 2024; 2 years ago
- Developer: CBL Properties
- Owner: Inlet Square Investments, LLC
- Num. of stores: 2 (formerly 45)
- Num. of anchor tenants: 3
- Floor area: 434,482 sq ft (40,364.7 m^{2})
- Floors: 1

Inlet Square Mall was a single-level, 434,482-square-foot (40,364.7 m^{2}) regional shopping center located in Garden City, South Carolina, United States. Opened in 1990, the mall originally housed 45 stores and services, but as of December 2023, it only has two major tenants remaining: Belk and Planet Fitness. The mall has encountered multiple difficulties due to store closures, including major anchors like Kmart and JCPenney, as well as junior anchors Stein Mart and Books-A-Million.

The opening of a Walmart Supercenter in Garden City led to the closure of Kmart in 2014, followed by the announcement of JCPenney's closure in 2015. In the same year, a Planet Fitness replaced the former Ladies Choice fitness center, and Stein Mart closed due to a lease issue but relocated to the South Strand Commons shopping center near Surfside Beach; the new location opened in October 2015. The mall officially closed on January 15, 2024 for redevelopment of the property.

== History ==
Inlet Square was built in 1990 by CBL Properties. It was the area's largest mall, slightly larger than the now demolished Myrtle Square Mall. The mall was bought in the early 2000s. It was originally going to be redesigned similarly to the successful Broadway at the Beach. With those plans falling through, a $4.5 million remodeling project began in 2007. This was the first renovation in the mall's history and had been much needed since the massive 1.3 million-square-foot (120,000 m^{2}) Coastal Grand Mall opened in 2004. The renovations weren't complete until 2011 due to financial hardships and loss of foot traffic. During this time, the mall lost most of its long-time tenants, including the 12-screen Regal Cinemas, in 2010. In 2011, Franks Cinebowl and Grill opened a new complex in the former Regal Cinemas, bringing new life to the mall. In 2014, the mall lost Kmart, which opened with the original mall in 1990, and also gained a Planet Fitness location in the former Ladies Choice location. In 2015, the mall was hit with two more tenant losses, with the closures of JC Penney and Stein Mart. This left Belk, Planet Fitness, and Books-A-Million as the only stores left in the mall.

On October 13, 2013, the owners of Inlet Square Mall, Murrells Retail Associates, a fictitious name under the parent company RAIT Financial Trust, sued Frank Theaters for failing to make lease payments on time on several occasions. The theater chain owed the mall $201,363 in unpaid rent and is asking a judge to accelerate nearly $24 million worth of payments which is due under a 20-year lease agreement that was signed in 2011. The Frank Theaters and CineBowl closed suddenly at midnight on May 14, 2016 with no notice to the public after being in business for five years.

On May 13, 2020, WBTW News reported that Books-A-Million had closed.

== Redevelopment ==
F + F Development began reconstruction of the mall in 2012 in an attempt to make it similar to the popular outdoor shopping center Broadway at the Beach. The construction caused F + F Development to go into bankruptcy, and RAIT Financial Trust took over the collateral as ownership and operators of Inlet Square Mall due to F & F Development default on the large Loan owed to Rait Financial Trust. Although managed by Urban Retail, RAIT Financial Trust was always the actual owner until they stopped paying rent to their landlord, West C Street Holdings, LLC as of June 2018 for 4 months until evicted. But all 4 months RAIT Financial Trust pocketed all the mall rent, kept all the tenant's Security Deposits ( $11,760) with the excuse of "we spent it" and RAIT skipped out on paying their share of 9 months occupying the building for 2018 Horry County Property Taxes($127,000). All of this totalling a $627k loss for West C Street Holdings, LLC in which in 2020 the motion ruled in Horry County Court as RAIT Financial Trust Attorney, Robert Jordan, admitted they currently owe West C Street Holdings $510,870.60 and understands this confession does not end the case and will continue whether RAIT regroups through Bankruptcy or not - there's still money in their hands. West C Street was forced to take over the operations of the mall after RAIT Financial Trust had let the mall fail by losing many tenants since they did not know how to operate a mall and this was further financial damage to West C Street and the mall.

In February 2023, the 50 thousand square foot mall which sits on around 60 acres of land was purchased by Inlet Square Investments LLC for $6 million. On October 9, 2023, it was revealed that the company plans to do extensive demolition of 70% to 80% of the mall, adding new buildings and making site improvements. It was noted that Planet Fitness as well as Belk currently open at the Mall is expected to stay following the redevelopment. There are plans to make the official announcement soon to clarify more specifics of the project.

The approval of the motion by the Horry County Administration Committee to redevelop Inlet Square Mall on November 28, 2023, reflects a desire to boost the local economy and draw more visitors to the area. In addressing worries about traffic and infrastructure, the council members hope to ensure a successful redevelopment project. However, the plan must now undergo review and scrutiny by the County Council, requiring it to pass three readings before it can be implemented.

On December 5, 2023, it was announced that the mall will be turned from a 500,000-square-foot enclosed mall to a 250,000 mixed-use development according to Paramount Development Corporation. The planned redevelopment includes a future hotel, retail, and other spaces. The property will also include a multi-family parcel of land of about 13.5 acres and will potentially feature eight three-story buildings that will consist of 24 units with a pool, clubhouse, and dog park. Redevelopment will be finished sometime during the Spring of 2025, according to the plan.

A new development for the region was announced on January 2, 2024. Horry County Council is moving forward with plans to redevelop Inlet Square, which has sat largely vacant for years. Officials aim to create a joint business park between Horry and Georgetown Counties, a project that would include upgrading Highway 17 bypass, evaluating local storm water infrastructure needs, and providing more recreation options for the future. The council is also seeking tax incentives to ensure the site does not remain idle. This collaborative effort between the counties has the potential to breathe new life into the area, spurring economic growth and community revitalization. The redevelopment promises to be a boon for the region if all goes according to plan.

On May 23, 2024, it was announced that the long-anticipated demolition of the Inlet Square Mall could begin as early as June of that year, marking the end of an era for this once-thriving commercial hub. According to the announcement, the entire mall structure would be demolished, except the Belk, former J.C. Penney, and K-Mart locations, which would be spared from the wrecking ball. Inlet Square Investments LLC, the Paramount Development-controlled company, had received the necessary demolition permit from Horry County just a week prior, on May 16, paving the way for this major redevelopment project. The plot of land approved for demolition spans an impressive 33 acres, and construction equipment was already spotted on-site as of May 20, signaling that preparations were well underway. The plans outlined by Paramount Development call for a dramatic transformation of the site, reducing the overall footprint from the current 500,000 square feet down to a more compact 250,000 square feet. This strategic downsizing reflects the evolving retail landscape, where large, traditional malls have struggled to maintain relevance in the face of the growing e-commerce industry and shifting consumer preferences. By streamlining the physical space, Paramount Development aims to create a more efficient and adaptable mixed-use development that can better cater to the modern needs of the community. The demolition of the Inlet Square Mall, while bittersweet for those with fond memories of the property, represents an opportunity for the area to undergo a transformative revitalization, paving the way for a new era of economic growth and community engagement.

On May 31, 2024, it was announced that the long-anticipated demolition of the aging property would finally be commencing next Wednesday as part of the former malls redevelopment plan. Belk and Planet Fitness will remain open during the demolition and construction process, which he said will take about 90 to 120 days to complete. Protecting the structures that will remain, keeping the parking lot lit, and protecting the surrounding environment are priorities for the redevelopment. It is expected that the retail shops will open fall of 2025, and that an announcement about the arrival of a national hotel brand is expected.

On June 12, 2024, it was announced that renovation work to revamp the Inlet Square Mall site has begun, with work to demolish the old theatre site starting on Monday. Work on the interior of the mall will begin later this month or in early July. Both Planet Fitness and Belk will remain open throughout the project, but Planet Fitness is temporarily closed while they move to a new location on the property. Developers are making major upgrades to the grounds, which include stormwater improvements.

On June 17, 2024, it was announced that Hobby Lobby is set open a new store once development of the former Inlet Square Mall property is complete. Development of the former mall property is expected and that is when Hobby Lobby could open. This would make the second location to open in Myrtle Beach with the first being in North Myrtle Beach.

On July 10, 2024, it was announced that a 134-room hotel, Home2Suites by Hilton, is planned for the Inlet Square site according to a requested variance form that was submitted to the Horry County Zoning Board of Appeals. The hotel will be on less than five acres of land near the Belk store. A Hobby Lobby is also planned and will occupy the former JCPenney site and is planned to open in 2025, barring any delays. Paramount Development also has a letter of intent for an additional retail vendor that will occupy a 55,000-square-foot space but did not state who the deal was with or when it would the deal would be finalized.

On October 26, 2024, it was announced that demolition had begun and that walls that had previously separated the Planet Fitness gym from the rest of the mall's common areas have been removed and a pile of rubble signified the first steps in an ongoing project to revitalize the old mall site. Paramount Development Corporation owns the mall and is leading the project. Details remain scarce, as neither the company's Vice President, David Harner, nor its real estate manager, Neil Bowers, were available to provide further comment.

On March 12, 2025, it was announced that the redevelopment of the Inlet Square Mall is in full swing with it bringing new life and businesses to the area. New store and restaurants will eventually move into the soon-to-be revamped Inlet Square Mall property. Parts of the mall have been demolished over the last few months as crews are working hard preparing new businesses. Both locals and businesses alike say a refresh is needed and local businesses are hoping the redevelopment and new businesses will bring them even more customers.

On April 14, 2025, it was announced that demolition will wrap up in the next few weeks, but that debris removal is still ongoing. The adding of parking lots, as well as site work, stormwater improvements and other utility work should start in April 2025. The project has changed from earlier plans for the mall. Originally there were plans to include residential housing, but according to the real estate manager they have received interest from other developers to add a residential component, but there are currently no plans to build housing on the site. Though residential development could occur sometime in the future, it is stressed that there is nothing in the works.

On September 25, 2025, it was announced that the first store at the former Inlet Square Mall site is officially open for business after years of planning. Floor & Decor recently celebrated its grand opening as part of what developers are describing as a long-term revitalization project for the South Strand. According to developers, this home improvement retailer marks the beginning of several new stores and restaurants intended to rejuvenate the once-bustling shopping center. Further development is forthcoming, including a Hobby Lobby anticipated to open in 2026, with construction already in progress for a new hotel. The South Carolina Department of Transportation is also planning roadway enhancements around the site, which will involve realigned intersections, additional turn lanes, and new traffic signals.

It was announced on February 9, 2026, it was announced that as development continues additional businesses have announced plans to open on the redeveloped property. Phase two of development of the former mall property is currently in progress after parts of the property and building were demolished last year. Construction of the new Hobby Lobby is close to completion and is expected to open sometime in the spring. Floor & Decor has already opened and Chipotle plans to open in one of the outparcels. A coffee company is also planned to be built next to Chipotle but wasn’t identified. Paramount Development is working with other potential businesses but aren’t ready to be announced. Construction is continuing on the new Hotel2Suites by Hilton though Paramount is not in charge of the construction after it was sold to build the hotel. It is unknown when redevelopment will be complete. Paramount does expect that a lot of things will open by summer.

== Gallery of the demolition ==
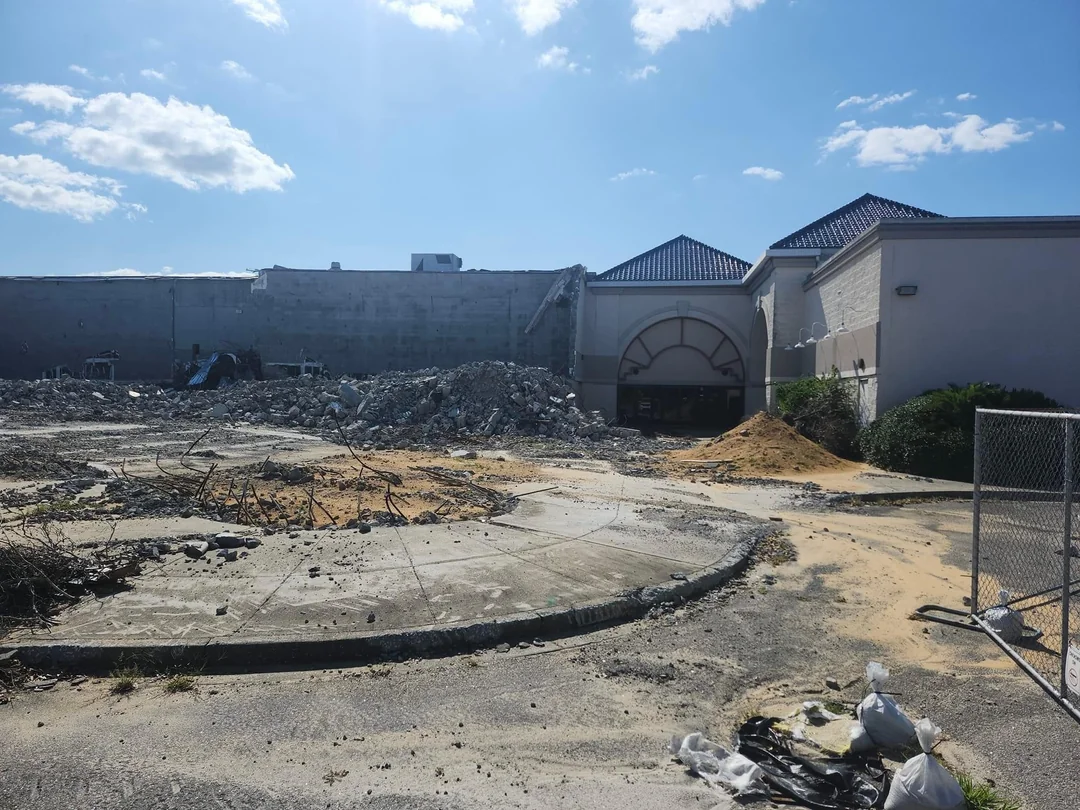
Inlet Square Mall Demolition 1

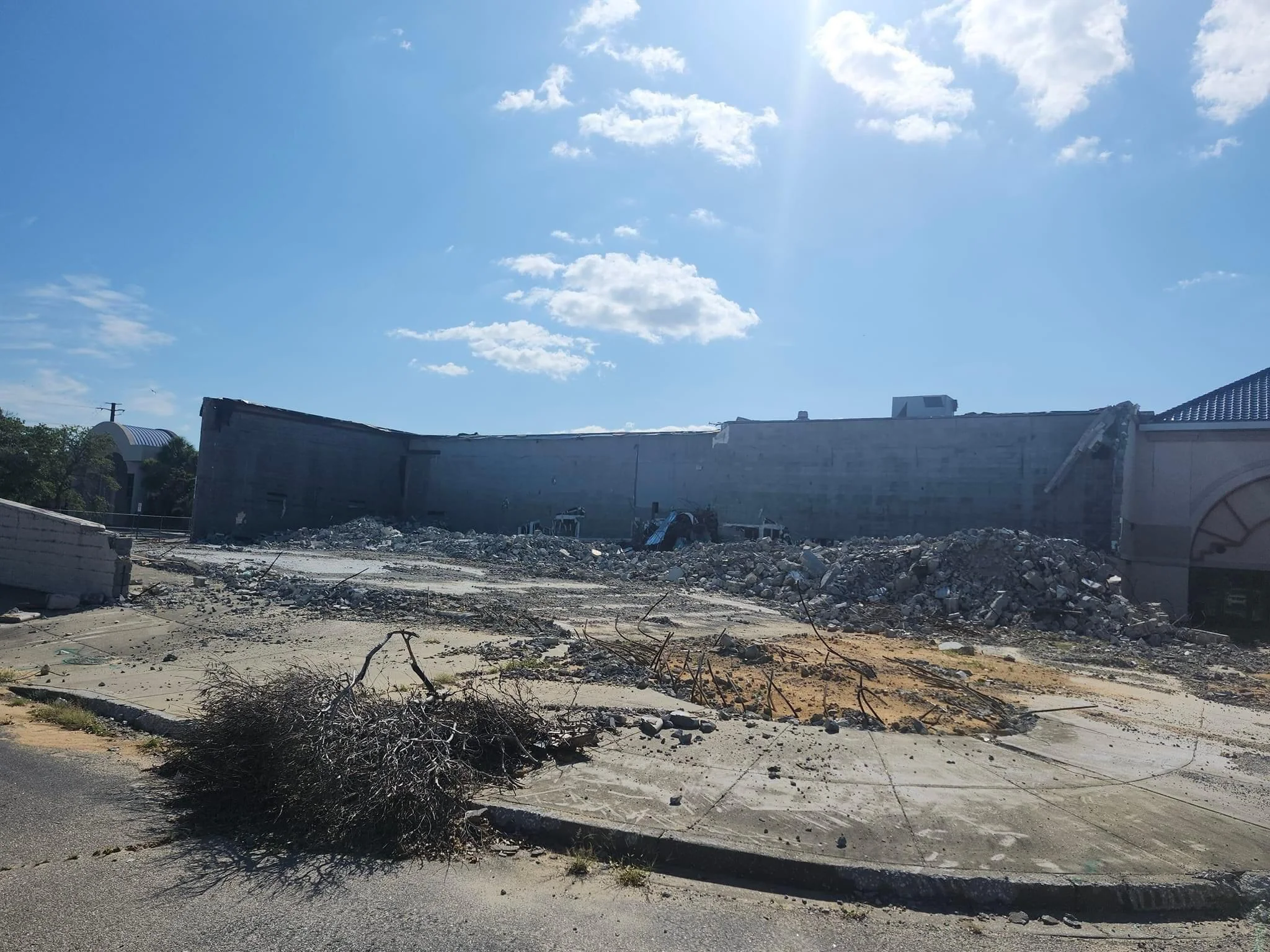
Inlet Square Mall Demolition 2

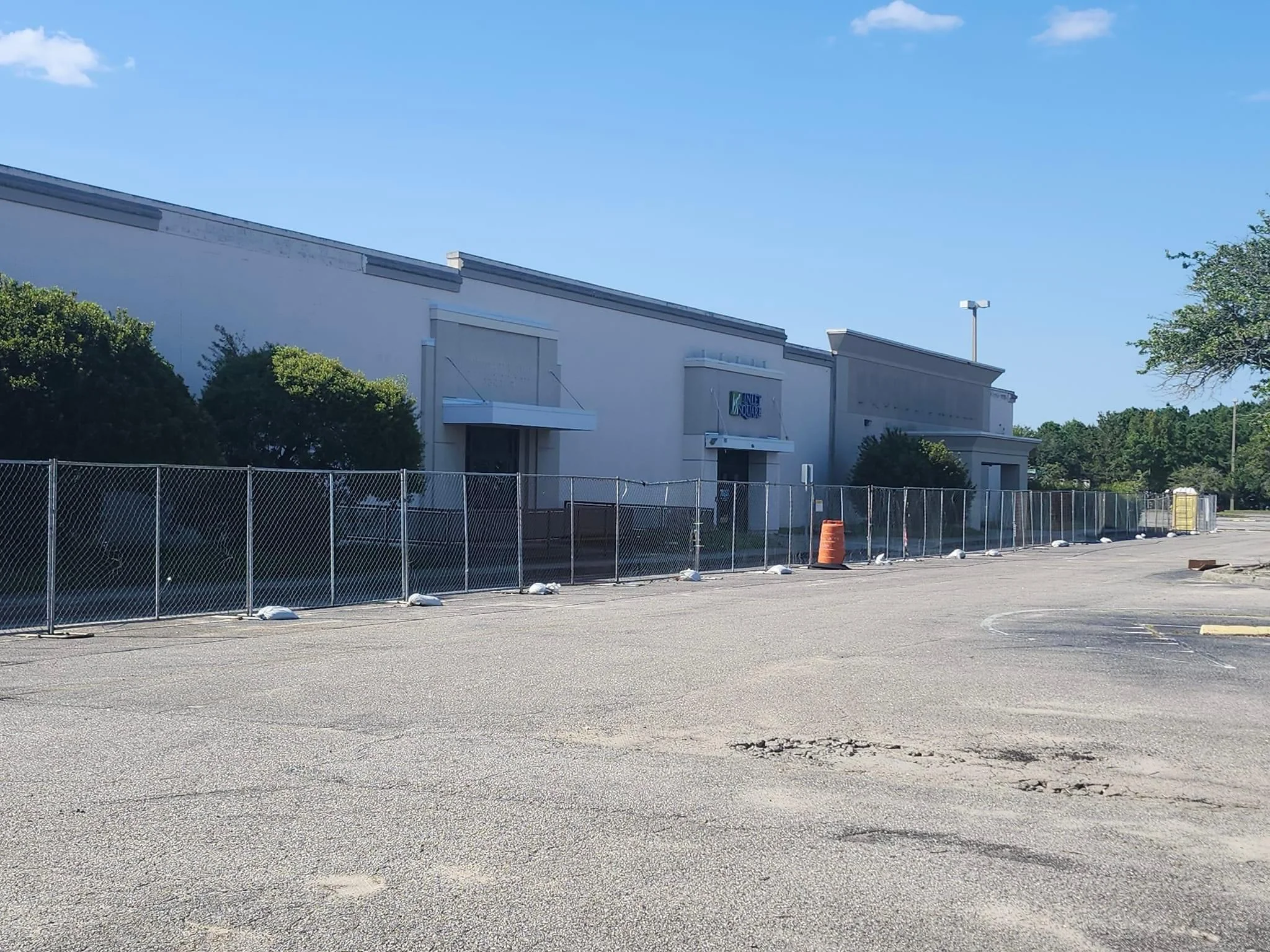
Inlet Square Mall Demolition 3

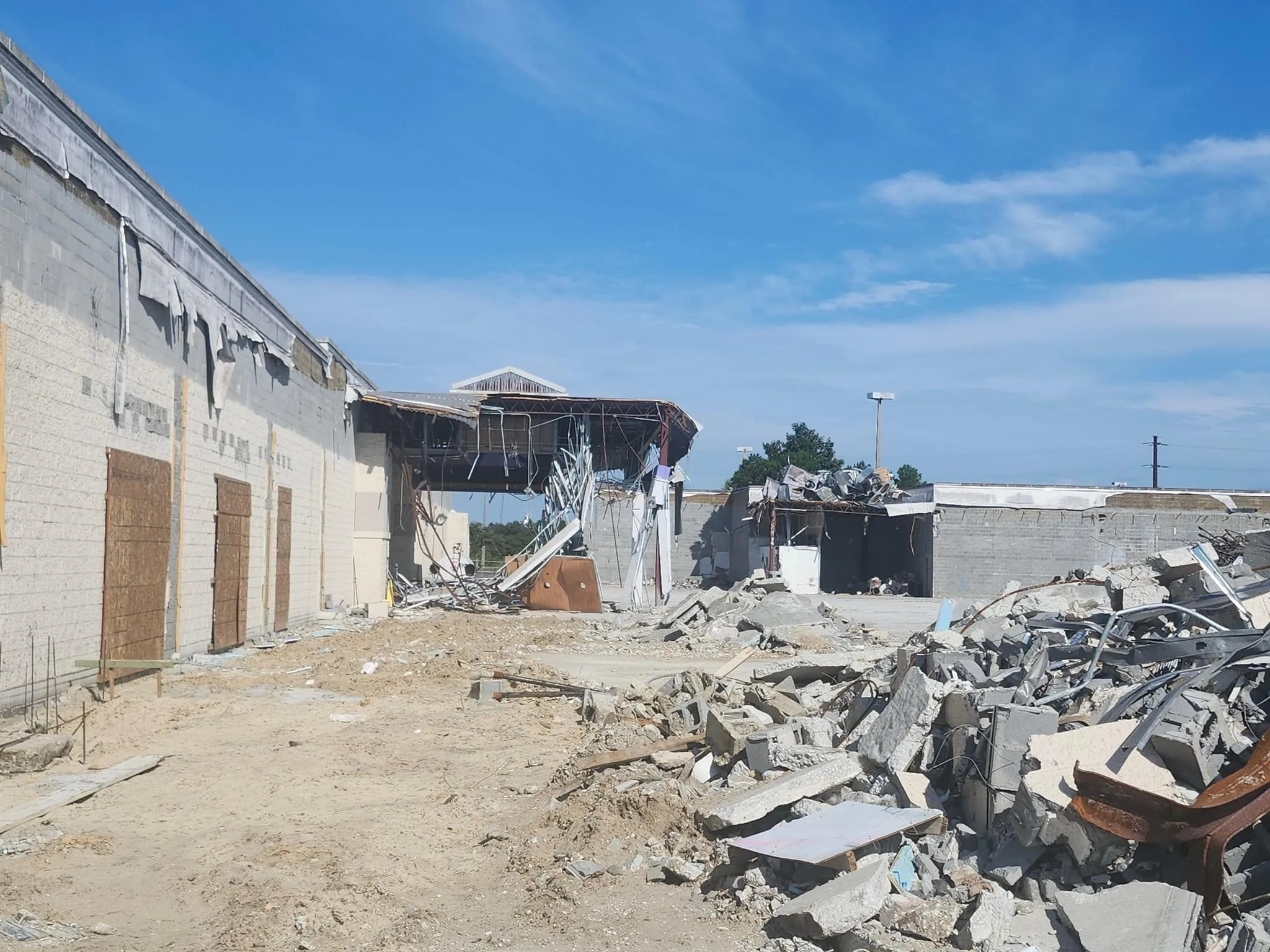
Inlet Square Mall Demolition 4

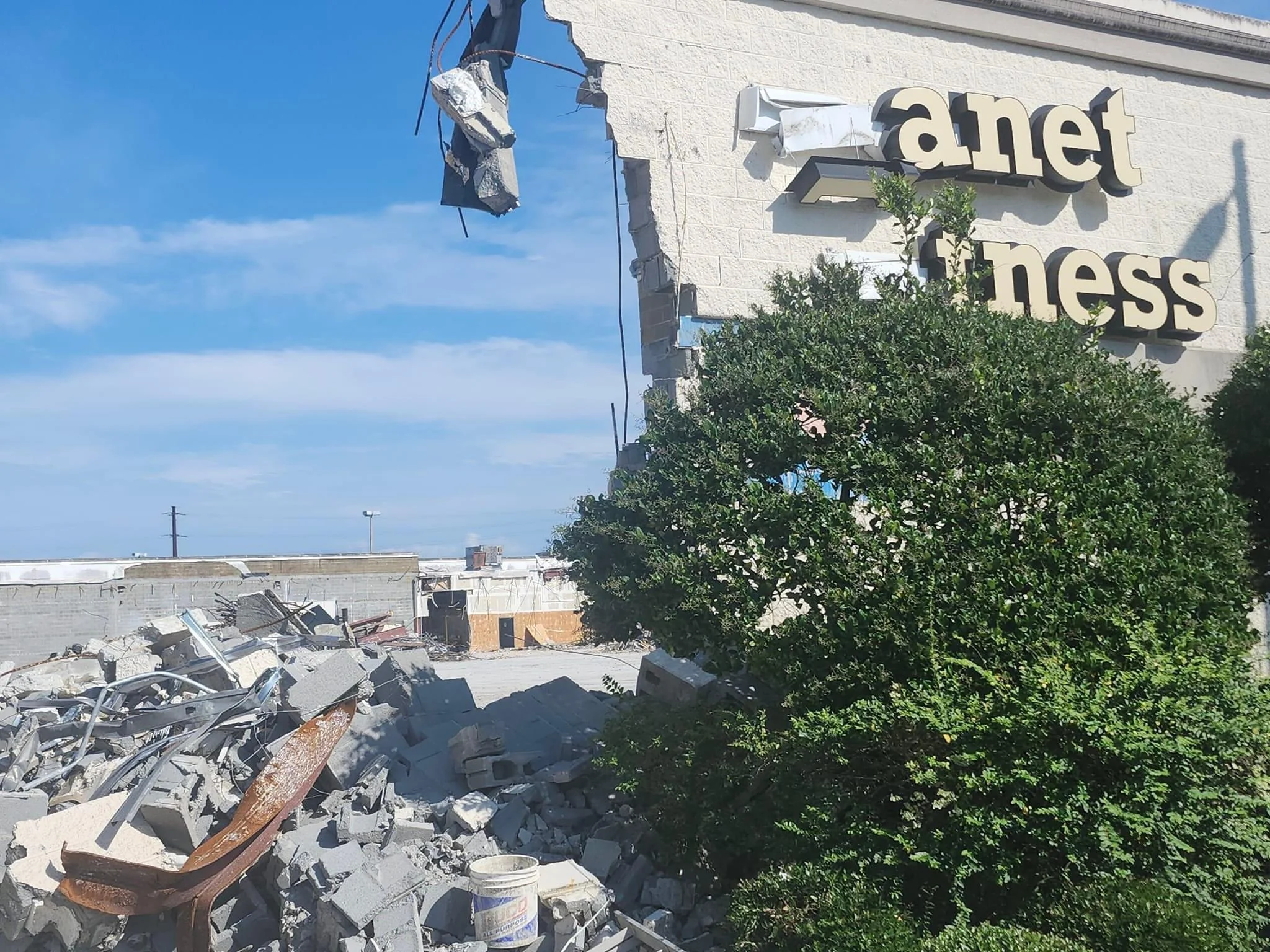
Inlet Square Mall Demolition 5
