= Margot Machol =

American writer and government official

Margot E. Machol (also known as Margot Machol Bisnow) is an American author and former United States government official. She is author of Raising an Entrepreneur: 10 Rules for Nurturing Risk Takers, Problem Solvers, and Change Makers. She is also a former commissioner of the Federal Trade Commission under Presidents Ronald Reagan and George H. W. Bush, and a former chief-of-staff of President Reagan's Council of Economic Advisers.

== Public service career ==
Machol was a commissioner of the Federal Trade Commission under President Reagan and nominated by President George H.W. Bush to the Commodity Futures Trading Commission. During the Reagan administration, she served in the Treasury Department and then as chief of staff to the Council of Economic Advisors. Later, she was a commissioner of the National Commission on Employment Policy; the first chief of staff of the Millennium Challenge Corporation; and staff director of the National H.E.L.P. Commission to advise the George W. Bush administration and Congress on the future of United States foreign aid. She began her government career with the Banking Committee of the US House of Representatives.

== Publications ==
Machol's book, Raising an Entrepreneur (New Harbinger 2016), is based on interviews with a highly diverse group of 60 noted entrepreneurs and their parents, distilling ten common ways in which the entrepreneurs were raised. Among those surveyed were founders of YouTube, TOMS Shoes, UnderArmour, Method, WordPress, Nantucket Nectars, Geek Squad, and Blue Man Group; founders of non-profits Pencils of Promise, FEED Projects, Kiva, charity: water, and Blue Star Families; and individuals known for solo careers such as movie director Jon Chu, actress Emmanuelle Chriqui, pop songwriter Benny Blanco, supermodel Karolina Kurkova, and political activist Mike de la Rocha.

In her book and in other writings, Machol argues that while it has become increasingly difficult to find satisfying jobs after college, it has become much easier to create modestly-financed startups. She therefore urges parents to help their children find their passions and consider one day building their own for-profit or non-profit adult occupation around them. She recommends that parents present entrepreneurship as a mainstream career choice for their children.

== Education ==
Machol has an MBA from Northwestern's Kellogg Graduate School of Management and a BA from Northwestern University.

== Personal ==
Machol is married to digital media entrepreneur Mark Bisnow. They have two children, Summit Series founder Elliott Bisnow, and Magic Giant lead singer Austin Bisnow. She is the daughter of Robert E. Machol.
