= Austin Bisnow =

American musician, songwriter, and record producer

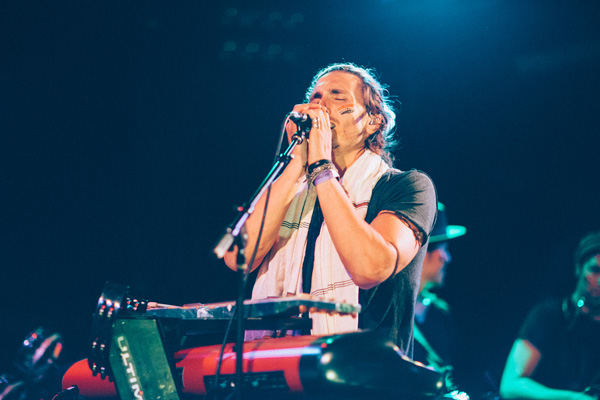
- Bisnow performing with Magic Giant at the Troubadour in 2014

Background information
- Born: June 9, 1987 (age 39); Washington, D.C., United States
- Genres: Pop; Alternative; Indie folk
- Occupations: Songwriter; Record producer; Musician; Entrepreneur
- Instruments: Vocals; Piano; Guitar
- Years active: 2009–present
- Labels: S-Curve; Concord; TigerBunny Records
- Website: magicgiant.com, somewhereinbetween.com

Austin Bisnow (born June 9, 1987) is an American musician, songwriter, record producer, and lead singer of the alternative band Magic Giant and co-lead singer of the indie folk duo Somewhere In Between. He has written and produced songs for artists such as David Guetta, John Legend, and Jon Batiste.

His band Magic Giant has performed on national television programs including The Today Show and Good Morning America, played festivals such as Coachella, released multiple charting singles on U.S. radio, and toured with OneRepublic, Mike Posner, and The Revivalists.

== Early life and education ==
Bisnow was born and raised in Washington, D.C.

He went on to the University of Colorado Boulder, where he played back-up long snapper for the Buffaloes and majored in music composition.

== Writer and producer ==
Bisnow is a writer, producer and pianist on the title track of David Guetta’s 2014 album Listen, featuring John Legend. The album went No. 1 on Billboard's Dance Electronic Chart the day it was released, reached No. 4 on the Billboard 200 making it Guetta's highest-charting album in the US, and reached No. 1 on iTunes in 75 countries.

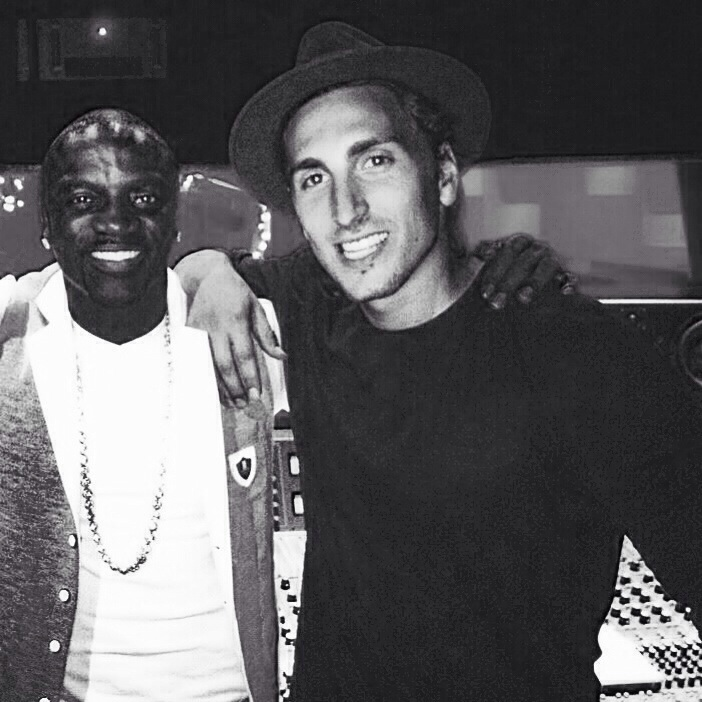
Bisnow with Akon in the studio

Bisnow is a writer and producer on Jon Batiste's single, “Express Yourself” from the album Social Music, which reached No. 1 on Billboard's Jazz chart.

Bisnow is also credited as a writer and producer on Big Time Rush's “Like Nobody’s Around” which reached No. 1 on Billboard's Kid Digital Song Sales chart.

In 2015, Bisnow co-wrote "Can't Wait To Love You" for the K-pop group, Beast which reached No. 1 on Japan’s Oricon Singles Chart.

Later that year, he also co-wrote the lead single "I Love It When You Cry (Moxoki)" featuring Moxie Raia off Steve Aoki's 2015 release, Neon Future II.

Under the name Austin Bis, he co-wrote and sang on Paul Oakenfold’s single “Who Do You Love”.

As a writer and producer, Bisnow has also collaborated with artists including Akon, Aloe Blacc, Diplo, will.i.am, Cody Simpson, and Benny Blanco.

As an instrumentalist, Bisnow played Rhodes piano on the Billboard No. 1 (US Mainstream Top 40) Gym Class Heroes’ “Stereo Hearts” (featuring Adam Levine), and organ on Cisco Adler’s “Classic” along with the remix featuring Sammy Adams.

== Get Well Soon Tour ==
In 2011, Bisnow teamed up with producer Benny Blanco to create the non-profit Get Well Soon Tour, which organizes surprise visits by musicians to children in hospitals across the US. Since their first visit with Justin Bieber on Valentine's Day, 2011, the tour has brought artists including Bruno Mars, Pitbull, Britney Spears, John Legend, Selena Gomez, Diplo, Robin Thicke, FUN., and Maroon 5.

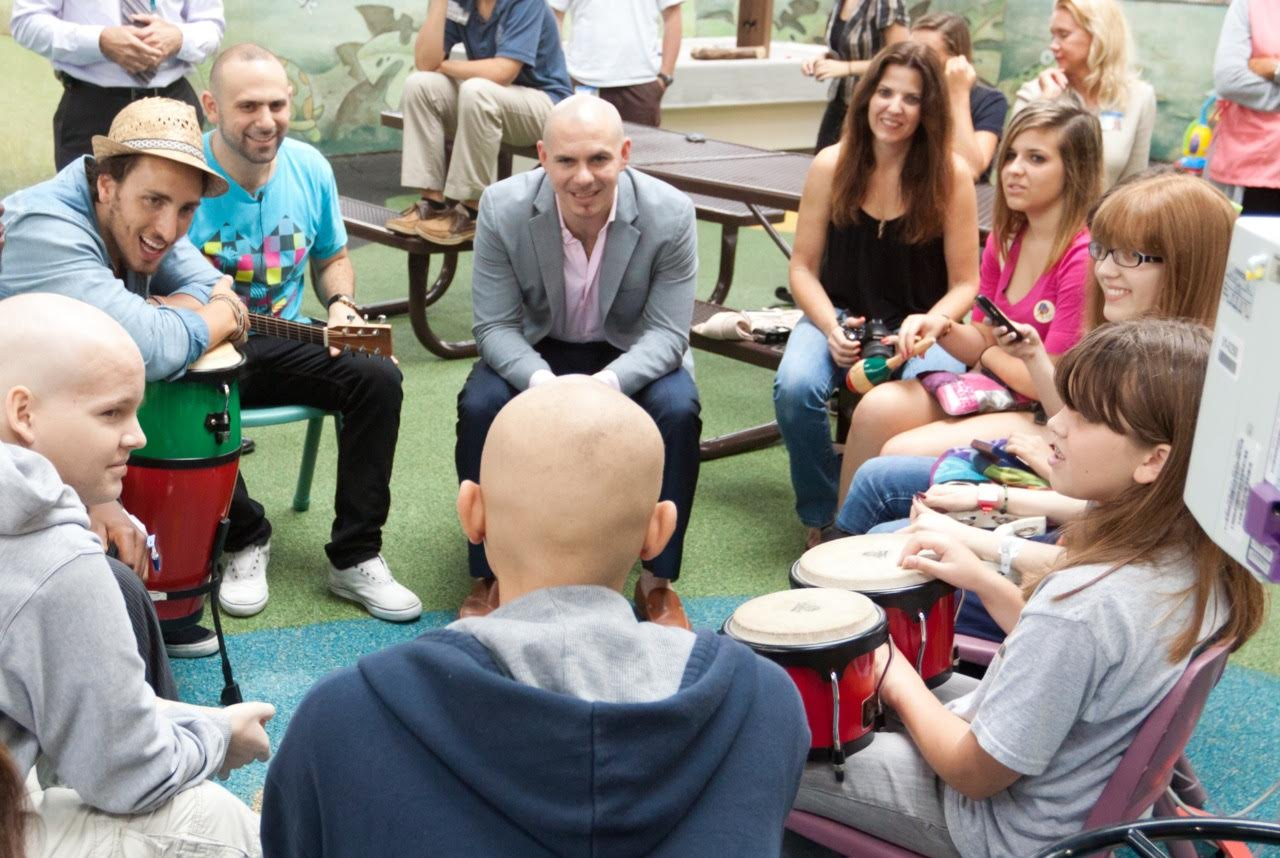
Pitbull joins Get Well Soon Tour

== Magic Giant ==
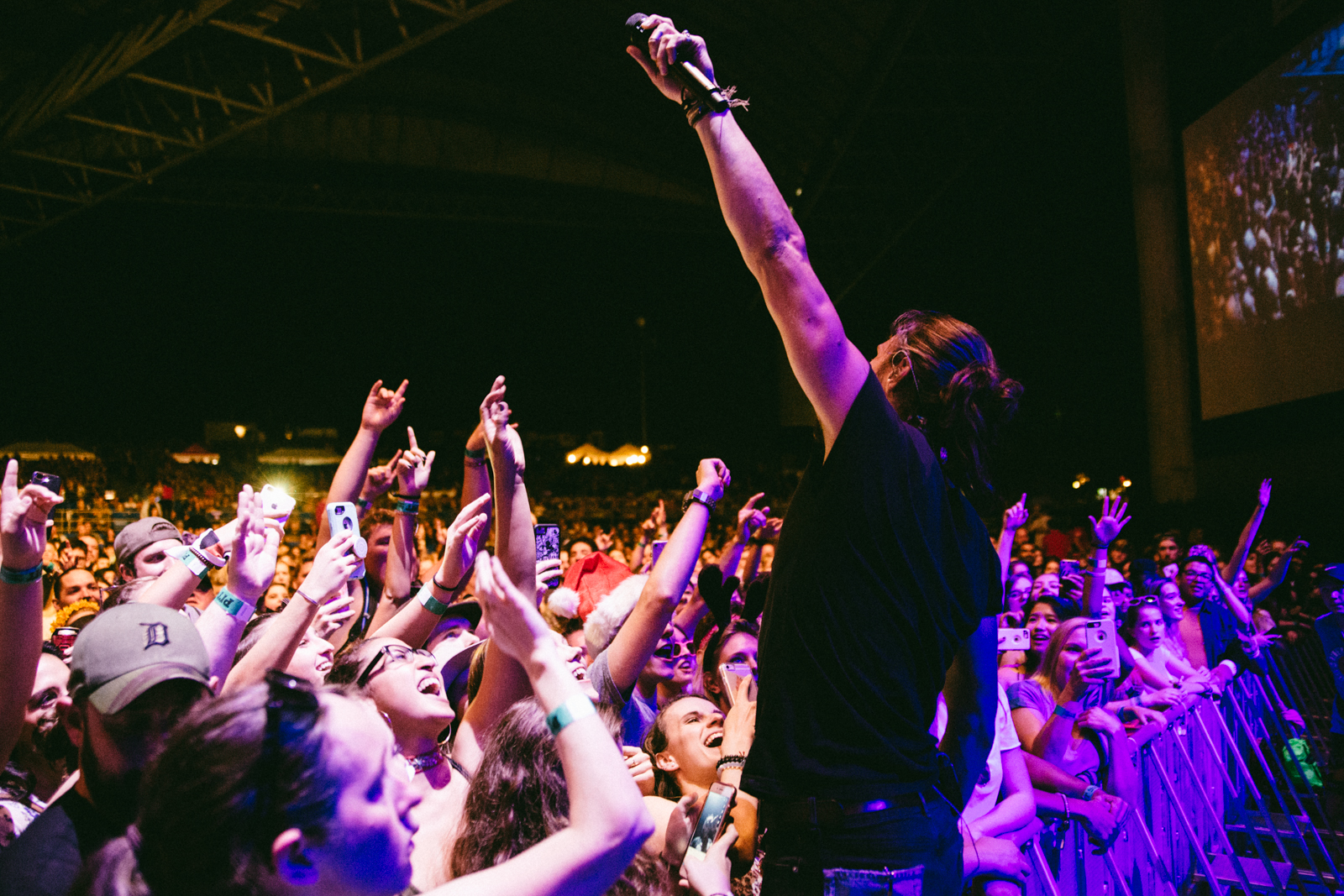
Magic Giant performing in Tampa Bay, Florida in December 2017

In 2014, Bisnow formed the alternative band Magic Giant with Zambricki Li and Zang.

Its singles "Set On Fire" charted top 30 on Billboard's Alternative chart and No. 4 on Spotify's US Viral 50, while its single, "Window" charted top 40 on Billboard's Hot AC and Adult Pop charts.

The band appeared on ABC's Good Morning America and NBC's Today show with Hoda Kotb and Kathie Lee Gifford as Elvis Duran's Artist of the Month, where they performed "Set on Fire" live.

The group was chosen as ALT 98.7's Artist in Residence and named by Rolling Stone as one of 10 New Artists You Need to Know.

The band has played festivals such as Coachella, BottleRock, Firefly, Electric Forest, and Lightning in a Bottle.

They have also toured with acts such as OneRepublic, Mike Posner, The Revivalists, Brandi Carlile, and American Authors.

=== Live From Quarantine ===
From March to May 2020, during the COVID-19 pandemic, Bisnow presented and hosted a four-weekend digital music festival fundraiser on Instagram Live called Live From Quarantine, featuring performances and appearances from The Lumineers, Woody Harrelson, Jason Mraz, Edward Norton, Walk the Moon, The Head and the Heart, David Blaine, Leslie Odom Jr., Edward Sharpe, LP, Walk off the Earth, Local Natives, Ashe, Plain White T's, Allen Stone, Shakey Graves, Nahko Bear, Thievery Corporation, and more.

The festival raised over $100,000 for Frontline Responders Fund to get personal protective equipment to hospital workers and for MusiCares Coronavirus Relief Fund to offer grants to music industry professionals whose livelihood had been affected by the pandemic.

== The Topanga A-Frame ==
In 2018, Bisnow and Robertson bought a 1976 A-frame house in Topanga Canyon, California. The couple designed and oversaw the renovation of the house and its grounds, including converting a dirt lot into a terraced garden. In 2026, the property was profiled by Dwell, the Los Angeles Times and HGTV, and it has been included in travel roundups by GQ, Vogue and Condé Nast Traveler. In 2025, the venue-booking platform Peerspace named it its "Wow Space" winner.

== Somewhere In Between ==
In June 2024, Bisnow and his wife Deena Robertson launched the indie folk duo Somewhere In Between. Their debut single, "Mr & Mrs," consists of the couple's wedding vows, which they recorded with Grammy Award-winning artist-producer RY X before Robertson underwent surgery for mouth cancer.

Somewhere In Between released their debut album, Stories Untold, in 2024, followed by We Are Only Human in 2026. Their 2025 single "Lay Your Head On Me" received coverage by outlets including Earmilk, 1883 Magazine, and Backseat Mafia.

In 2025, the duo launched In Between Coffee, a half-caffeinated coffee brand.

== Personal life ==
Bisnow is married to Deena Robertson, Canadian entrepreneur and co-founder of Modo Yoga LA, a Los Angeles hot yoga studio now called North Ray Yoga. The couple collaborates in the indie folk duo Somewhere In Between and on other entrepreneurial ventures.

Austin Bisnow is the brother of Elliott Bisnow (best known as the founder of Summit, and from 2013 to 2023 a co‐owner of Powder Mountain Ski Resort in Utah). He is also the son of author Margot Machol and media entrepreneur Mark Bisnow.
