= Myrtle Beach Mall =

Shopping mall in Briarcliffe Acres, South Carolina

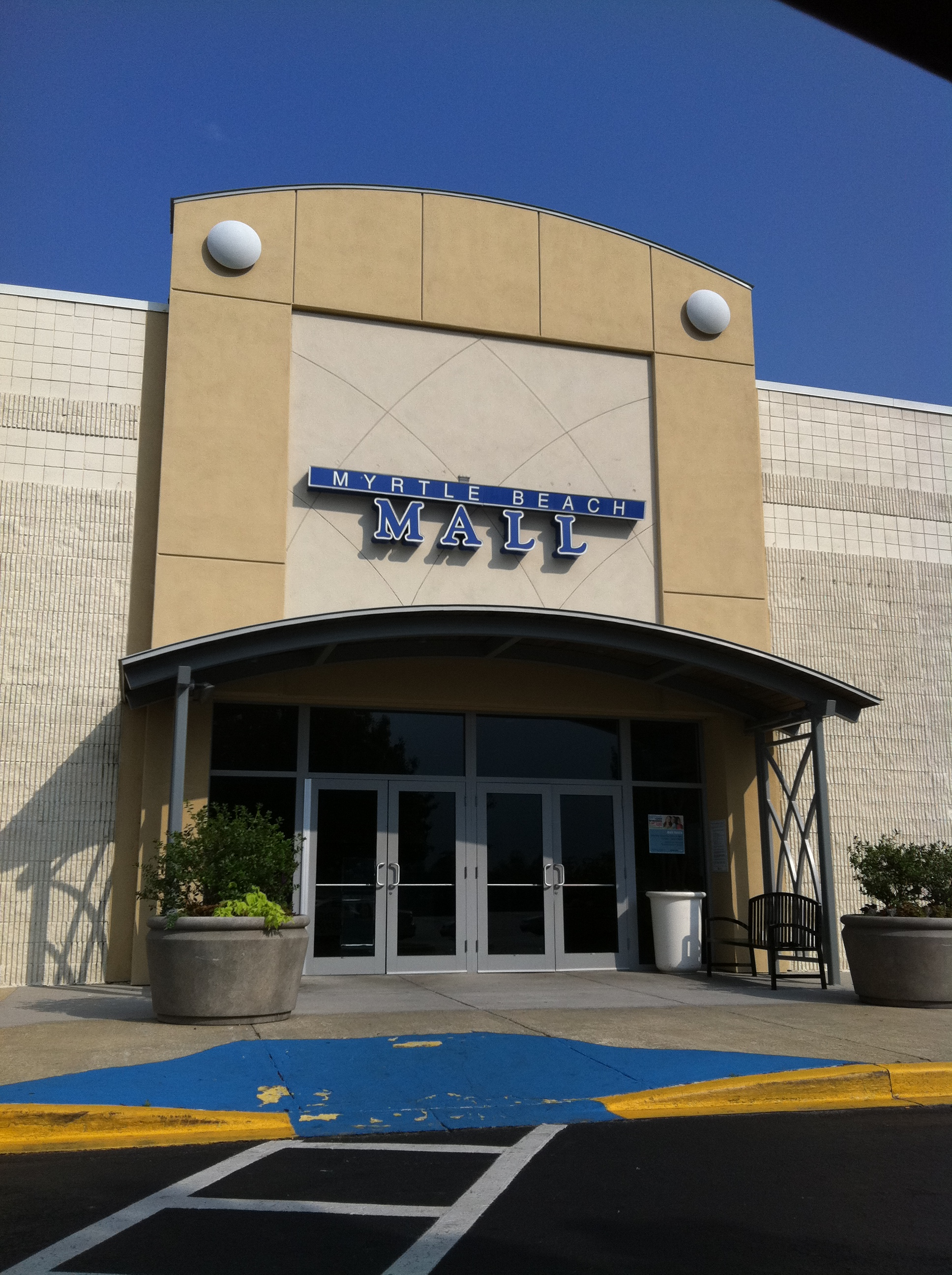
- Entrance to Myrtle Beach Mall, August 2011
- Location: Briarcliffe Acres, South Carolina, United States
- Coordinates: 33.7925903°N 78.7667478°W
- Address: 10177 North Kings Highway
- Opened: 1986
- Developer: Shopco Advisory Group
- Manager: Jones Lang LaSalle
- Owner: Colonial Properties Trust (1986-2007), Jones Lang LaSalle (2007-2014), Peak Financial Partners/Msuma Holdings Corp (2014-current)
- Num. of stores: 35+
- Num. of anchor tenants: 5
- Floor area: 523,414 sq ft (48,626.8 m^{2})
- Floors: 1
- Website: www.misumaholdings.com/myrtle-beach-mall

Myrtle Beach Mall is a regional shopping mall located in Briarcliffe Acres, South Carolina, United States. The mall has 523,414 square feet (48,626.8 m^{2}) of GLA space.

== Description ==
The Myrtle Beach Mall is located adjacent to the intersection of 22 and 17 in Briarcliffe Acres, South Carolina. The mall includes a Belk (Men's and Women's stores), AMC Theatres, Books-A-Million, South Carolina's first Bass Pro Shops Outdoor World, and Players Choice Myrtle Beach (Comic book trading store and ’80s video arcade). The mall formerly had a Foot Locker, Hallmark and Bath & Body Works. The mall has fewer than 40 stores in total.

== History ==
The mall originally opened in 1986 as "Briarcliffe Mall", with the name later changing to "Colonial Mall Myrtle Beach." It was the second mall to open in the area, with the first being the now-defunct Myrtle Square Mall. The name was changed to Myrtle Beach Mall in 2007 after being purchased by Jones Lang LaSalle, who acquired it from Colonial Properties Trust in July 2007. The mall's last major update was in 2004. It is one of three malls in the Grand Strand area. The super-regional Coastal Grand Mall is located to the south in Myrtle Beach and the other being Inlet Square Mall in Murrells Inlet.

In 2004, a Bass Pro Shops was added, after Kmart which had previously anchored the mall at that end was demolished. The Myrtle Beach Mall store was the first Bass Pro Shops location in South Carolina (other locations include Greenville and Fort Mill), and has helped keep the mall a viable retail establishment in the Grand Strand. The second Belk store was added in 1994, as the original Belk store required expansion but was landlocked.

In 2005, the Briarcliff Cinemas located behind the mall, closed on August 18, 2005, and the former Briarcliff Cinemas building was demolished to construct a larger and new cinema complex by the name of Colonial Cinemas 12. The new cinema complex opened in spring 2006.

On May 17, 2014, it was announced Peak Financial Partners, a private real estate investment firm, as well as Msuma Holdings Corp acquired the mall for $45 million.

On May 22, 2014, it was reported that the new owners of the Myrtle Beach Mall say that architects have already developed a couple of new concepts for the mall and there are plans to change the mall in order to attract more shoppers. The first changes would be a redesign of the food court, followed by a conversion of the center of the mall, the theater area and the mall's front.

In 2017, the Colonial Cinemas 12 was renamed AMC Colonial Mall 12.

On January 17, 2020, it was announced that JCPenney would be closing as part of a plan to close 6 stores nationwide. The store closed on July 26, 2020.

On February 14, 2025, the former JCPenney anchor store was demolished to make way for a new restaurant and bowling alley called Guy Fieri’s Downtown Flavortown, expected to open in June 2026. The restaurant is to include a tiki bar, bowling alley, and an arcade. Guy Fieri’s Downtown Flavortown opened on June 5, 2026 and the new restaurant occupies the entire anchor space.

== Anchors ==
- AMC Theatres (50,000 sq ft (4,600 m^{2}))
- Bass Pro Shops (108,048 sq ft (10,038.0 m^{2}))
- Belk East (61,234 sq ft (5,688.8 m^{2}))
- Belk North (57,621 sq ft (5,353.2 m^{2}))
- JCPenney (50,475 sq ft (4,689.3 m^{2})) (closed July 26, 2020 and demolished for Guy Fieri’s Downtown Flavortown)
- Guy Fieri’s Downtown Flavortown (50,000 sq ft (4546.2 m²)) (located at the former JCPenney anchor space)
