= Powder Haven =

Powder Haven is a private, 650-family residential community located within Powder Mountain ski resort on the Wasatch Range of northern Utah, United States. The community of ski-in, ski-out homes is part of a blended public-private operating model in which homeownership funds improvements and public land management.

== Location & Geography ==
Powder Haven is located on Powder Mountain in Eden, Utah, about 60 miles north of Salt Lake City. The residential community sits within one of the largest ski areas in the United States by acreage.

== Population & Membership ==
Powder Haven surpassed 150 club members by early 2025. Access to Powder Haven private member amenities requires the purchase of a residential lot plus annual membership fees.

== History ==
Powder Haven originated in 2012 when founders of the Summit Series announced plans to purchase Powder Mountain to serve as a base for their events. Their vision included building an alpine village of roughly 500 homes with retail, hotel, and event spaces designed for community members.

In March 2023, Netflix co-founder Reed Hastings was approached by the Summit Series founders about purchasing the resort. At the time, only a fraction of the proposed residential units had been built. Much of the resort's infrastructure had not been significantly updated since the 1970s and 1980s. Hastings had been skiing in Park City, Utah since 2014. He bought a home on Powder Mountain in 2021.

In September 2023, Hastings agreed to acquire Powder Mountain and announced revenue from private residential development would help fund improvements to the broader resort. Hastings described his model as a means of allowing the broader resort to avoid joining multi-resort pass programs like those at Vail Resorts and Alterra Mountain Company.

== Development ==
Powder Haven's new members-only ski lift, Raintree, was completed in the resort's first season under Hasting's ownership and two more members-only lifts were slatted for construction.

By March 2025, Hastings had publicly pledged $200 million towards Powder Haven development. The first phase of residential inventory included 39 properties.

In September 2025, construction began on Arclodge, a 73,000-square-foot private clubhouse planned to include dining, recreational and wellness facilities. The clubhouse is projected to open in the 2027-28 ski season.

In December 2025, Cache County unanimously approved a master plan for Powder Mountain that established oversight of Powder Haven's residential development by the Powder Haven Property Owners Association and an architectural review process for new custom homes.

In May 2026, a second phase of residential development included 34 homesites and eight chalets.

Hastings has stated roughly two-thirds of the mountain's terrain will remain open to the public, with the remaining third reserved for members and their guests.

== See also ==
- Powder Mountain
- Reed Hastings
- Wasatch Range
- Dia Art Foundation
