= Martin Ringlein =

American entrepreneur

- Education: University of Maryland (BS); Columbia Business School
- Occupation: Entrepreneur
- Known for: Founding nclud, nvite, and Agree.com
- Title: CEO of Agree.com

Martin Ringlein is an American entrepreneur, and product designer known for founding technology companies, including nclud, nvite, and Agree.com. He has held leadership roles in research and development at tech firms and participated as a White House Presidential Innovation Fellow.

== Education ==
Ringlein earned a Bachelor of Science in Computer Science from the University of Maryland. He later completed an Executive MBA at Columbia Business School.

== Career ==
Ringlein began his career in design and technology. In 2007, he co-founded nclud, a Washington, D.C.-based design agency that provided services to clients including Apple Inc., Amazon, and Oracle Corporation. In 2012, Twitter acquired nclud, and Ringlein named as Twitter's Design Manager.

In 2014, Ringlein founded nvite, an event planning and ticketing platform. The platform was later acquired by Eventbrite in 2017. Following the acquisition, Ringlein joined Eventbrite and worked in product and research-related roles during a period leading up to the company’s initial public offering.

Ringlein has also been involved in venture investment and startup advising. He has served as a venture partner at NextGen Venture Partners and as a general partner at Adventure Fund, where he has participated in investments in technology startups including Chime, SpaceX, Uber, and Hyperloop One. He has also advised or consulted for financial technology companies including Brex and Plaid.

In 2024, Ringlein co-founded Agree.com, a software platform focused on digital agreements, electronic signatures, and integrated payment tools. The company reported raising $3 million in pre-seed funding in September 2024 and an additional $7.2 million in seed funding in May 2025.

Ringlein serves as an adjunct lecturer in the Master of Product Design and Development Management program at Northwestern University's Segal Design Institute, teaching courses on product design and development.

== Public service and advisory roles ==
Ringlein has been involved with programs related to civic technology and innovation. He was associated with the Presidential Innovation Fellows program, an initiative that brings private-sector technologists into U.S. government agencies to work on technology and digital services projects. He was also appointed to the District of Columbia's Digital DC Tech Fund Investment Advisory Board.

== Awards and recognition ==
In 2015, Ringlein was included in Bisnow’s list of Washington, D.C.'s 40 Under 40. The same year, he was also named to Washingtonian Magazine's list of100 Top Tech Leaders in Washington, D.C. He has spoken at conferences, including as an official speaker at the South by Southwest (SXSW) Conference in 2019 on research and development topics.
