= Powder Mountain =

Ski resort in Utah

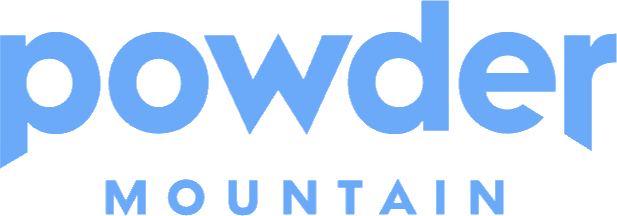

- Location in the United States Location in Utah
- Location: Cache, Weber counties, Utah, United States
- Nearest city: Ogden, Utah; 19 miles (31 km) southwest
- Coordinates: 41°22′48″N 111°46′49″W
- Vertical: 2,205 ft (672 m) lift-served 2,522 ft (769 m) via hiking
- Top elevation: 8,900 ft (2,713 m) lift-served 9,422 ft (2,872 m) via hiking
- Base elevation: 6,900 ft (2,103 m)
- Skiable area: 8,000 acres (32.4 km^{2}); 4,200 acres (17.0 km^{2}) lift-served
- Trails: 162; 25% beginner 40% intermediate 35% advanced
- Longest run: 3 miles (5 km)
- Lift system: 6 chairs, 3 surface lifts
- Lift capacity: 6,350 skiers per hour
- Terrain parks: 2
- Snowfall: 360 in (30 ft; 9.1 m) per year
- Snowmaking: Sundown
- Night skiing: 1 chair, 1 surface lift
- Website: https://www.powdermountain.com

Powder Mountain is a ski resort located in the western United States east of Eden, Utah, stretching between Weber and Cache counties in the Wasatch Range which covers 12,000 acres (18.8 sq mi; 48.6 km^{2}), and is one of the largest ski resorts in the U.S. The resort was established in 1972, and has 162 trails, nine lifts, and two terrain parks; it is 55 miles (90 km) northeast of the Salt Lake City International Airport.

== Powder Haven ==
Located at the panoramic summit of Powder Mountain, Powder Haven is a residential and 650-family private-ski community nestled in 12,000 acres of alpine wilderness overlooking the Great Salt Lake.

== Powder Art Foundation ==
Powder Art Foundation is a non-profit organization dedicated to celebrating the legacy of land art and supporting the vision of contemporary artists on Powder Mountain.

Powder Mountain has six public chairlifts (Timberline, Lightning Ridge, DMI, Sundown, Hidden Lake, & Paradise) and three homeowner dedicated lifts (Village, Mary's, & Raintree). Beyond its lift-accessed terrain, it can also be accessed by snowcat, cat skiing and guided tours.

== History ==
Powder Mountain had been the winter range for Frederick James Cobabe's sheep. Between 1902 and 1948, Cobabe accumulated land around Eden and improved its previous poor land management.

Cobabe's son Alvin bought his father's livestock company (with its 8,000 acres) in 1948, and later acquired adjacent properties. When he opened Powder Mountain on February 19, 1972, he owned 14,000 acres.

During the resort's first season, the Sundown lift was the only one in operation. The area was illuminated for night skiing, a ski school was established, and food was prepared on an outdoor barbecue. The main and Sundown lodges and the Timberline lift were added during the 1972–73 season.

Alvin Cobabe sold Powder Mountain in 2006 to Western American Holdings. The resort remained under the same management team, led by Aleta Cobabe (Alvin's daughter) during the 2006–07 season. It was purchased by Summit Series, an event-hosting group, in 2013. Reed Hastings, co-founder of Netflix and homeowner at Powder, acquired Powder Mountain 2023 and assumed his current role as CEO & Chairman.

=== Timeline ===
- 1971–72: Powder Mountain opens with the Sundown Lift; ski school begins.
- 1972–73: Main and Sundown lodges and Timberline Lift open.
- 1975–76: Hidden Lake Lift added.
- 1981–82: Shuttle service for employees and for Powder Country begin.
- 1984–85: Powder Mountain is one of the first Utah resorts to permit snowboarding.
- 1986–87: Hidden Lake Day Lodge opens.
- 1994–95: Sunrise Lift opens.
- 1999–2000: The quad Paradise Lift opens an additional 1,300 acres (5.3 km^{2}) of lift-accessed terrain. Snowcat skiing moves to Lightning Ridge, accessing an additional 700 acres (2.8 km^{2}) acres.
- 2006–07: A high-speed lift replaces the Hidden Lake Lift.
- 2012–13: Summit purchases Powder Mountain.
- 2016–17: The Village Lift and Mary's Lift Skytrac Systems are added.
- 2023: Reed Hastings (co-founder and former co-CEO of Netflix) assumes ownership of Powder Mountain. Introduces blended public-private ski resort model, new real estate development, and plans for open-air museum & sculpture park.

== Awards & Accolades ==
In 2023, Ski Magazine ranked Powder Mountain #1 in their annual Top 30 Resorts in the West, and Men's Journal named Powder "Best Ski Resort to Avoid the Crowds" in their 2024 Best Ski Resorts in U.S. List. In addition to widespread recognition as one of the best ski resorts in the country, Architectural Digest called Powder "The Hottest Design Destination You Probably Haven't Heard Of" in 2018, due to the unique architectural vision of its residential community.
