= Peak Companies =

- Current logo, in use since 2021
- Type: Private
- Industry: Real estate; Financial services; Investment management
- Founded: 1991; 35 years ago in Los Angeles, California, U.S.
- Founders: Eli Tene; Gil Priel
- Headquarters: Peak Professional Plaza, Los Angeles, California, USA
- Area served: United States
- Website: peakcorp.com

Peak Companies, previously known as Peak Corporate Network, is a group of affiliated American businesses providing real estate, financial and related services, headquartered in Los Angeles, California.

Its constituent businesses include real estate brokerage and investment, mortgage financing, property management, tax-deferred exchanges, foreclosure servicing, construction, materials procurement, insurance and commercial landscaping.

== History ==
=== Origins and expansion ===
Peak Companies traces its origins to 1991, when Eli Tene and Gil Priel began conducting real estate transactions, including negotiations involving short sales of residential and commercial properties.

According to a 2011 profile in the Los Angeles Business Journal, Tene founded iShortSale in 2006, anticipating greater demand for short-sale services during the U.S. housing downturn. The publication documented the growth of the short-sale operations and expansion into related real estate service businesses.

By 2011, Peak Corporate Network encompassed multiple businesses involved in property transactions, foreclosure processing and related services.

=== Investments and brokerage activities ===
In 2014, a joint venture between Peak Financial Partners and Misuma Holdings was reported to have acquired Myrtle Beach Mall in South Carolina in a $45 million transaction.

In 2015, the network expanded its residential brokerage operations under the Century 21 Peak name, including an announced acquisition of Century 21 All Moves in Granada Hills, California. In 2017, Peak Finance arranged approximately $103 million in financing for the L+O Residences development in North Hollywood, a mixed-use project comprising apartments and a grocery store.

In February 2025, Peak Financial Partners joined Tryperion Holdings and Duke Real Estate in an acquisition of Imperial Valley Mall in El Centro, California.

== Business activities ==
Peak Companies describes itself as a brand representing related but legally separate businesses rather than a single operating company.

=== Real estate services ===
Real estate business related to Peak include Peak Commercial, a commercial real estate brokerage; Peak 1031 Exchange, which provides qualified-intermediary services for tax-deferred property exchanges; Peak Asset Management, which provides property and asset management; Peak Foreclosure Services, providing foreclosure and default servicing; Grand Investment Group, which focuses on property and debt investment; and iShortSale, which provides short-sale negotiation services.

=== Financial services ===
Financial services business related to Peak include Peak Financial Partners, a private real estate investor in debt and equity transactions; Peak Finance Commercial, providing commercial real estate financing; Peak Finance Company, providing residential mortgage financing; and Peak Finance Network, a mortgage brokerage.

=== Related services ===
Other businesses related to Peak include Interserv LP, which undertakes hospitality, retail and commercial renovations and construction; SupplyX, a supplier and procurement partner for building finish materials; Grand Mutual Insurance, an insurance agency offering personal and commercial insurance; and Advanced Landscape 2000, a provider of commercial landscape and irrigation services.
