= Bisnow Media =

US digital media company

- Type: Private
- Industry: Digital media
- Founded: 2005
- Headquarters: New York
- Key people: Will Friend, CEO; Mark Bisnow, Founder; Ryan Begelman, Former CEO & Co-Owner
- Owner: Wicks Group
- Number of employees: 75
- Website: www.bisnow.com

Bisnow Media, also known as Bisnow, is a multi-platform digital media company that produces news and live events. Founded in 2005, Bisnow Media is owned by private equity firm Wicks Group and has offices in New York and Washington, D.C. with 75 full-time employees as of 2014. Covering 27 metropolitan markets across the U.S., Canada and the U.K. with a subscriber base of over 600,000, Bisnow is one of the largest producers of commercial real estate news and events. The company's publications have been described as similar to Business Insider, covering topics such as real estate, technology and businesses with a slight irreverence similar to BuzzFeed.

== History ==
The company was founded in 2005 by Mark Bisnow, a DC lawyer, business executive, and radio talk show host, who had become known for irreverent "Bisnow on Business" radio spots on the local all-news station and active involvement in local business organizations and philanthropies. Bisnow wanted to take advantage of the new economics and reading habits of the Internet age to provide timelier, lighter, and more personality-focused news fare than traditionally available, and deliver it to niche business audiences.

Mark Bisnow was named Chairman when he turned over the CEO position to Ryan Begelman, previously the COO of Bisnow and also co-founder of Summit Series. Will Friend was named CEO of Bisnow in January 2015.

In 2012, Bisnow launched "Escape", a brand of recurring events that gather top commercial real estate owners, developers, and financiers for multi-day retreats.

By the end of 2012, Bisnow generated $11 million in revenue amounting to a 70 percent compounded three-year growth rate. The following year, Bisnow partnered with Peter Linneman, the Wharton School real estate program founder, to launch a video education series. By the end of 2013, the company was operating in 22 markets and producing 31 newsletters. Bisnow has been included on Crain's New York Business' list of the fastest growing companies in New York for 2013 and 2014.

In May 2016, Bisnow Media was acquired by Wicks Group, a private equity firm based in New York, for an estimated $50 million.

== Operations ==
Bisnow produces industry-specific e-newsletters highlighting news and information primarily for commercial real estate professionals. The company distributes its e-newsletters to over 600,000 subscribers. The company also produces business-related events which have also featured experts on topics such as the arts, philanthropy, relationships, technology, and futurism.
