= Floor & Decor =

American home improvement store

Floor & Decor Holdings, Inc.
- Formerly: FDO Holdings, Inc. (2000–2017)
- Type: Public
- Traded as: NYSE: FND (Class A); S&P 400 component
- ISIN: US3397501012
- Industry: Retail and services
- Founded: 2000; 26 years ago in Atlanta, Georgia, United States
- Founder: George West
- Headquarters: Smyrna, Georgia, U.S.
- Number of locations: 281 (1 Jan. 2026)
- Area served: United States
- Key people: Norman H. Axelrod (chairman of the board); George Vincent West (vice chairman of the board); Bradley Paulsen (CEO); Bryan Langley (CFO)
- Products: Hard surface flooring and related accessories
- Revenue: ▲US$3,433.53 million (2021)
- Net income: ▲US$283.23 million (2021)
- Total equity: ▲US$1,323.2 million (2021)
- Number of employees: 11,985 (December 29, 2022)
- Subsidiaries: Floor and Decor Outlets of America, Inc.
- Website: flooranddecor.com

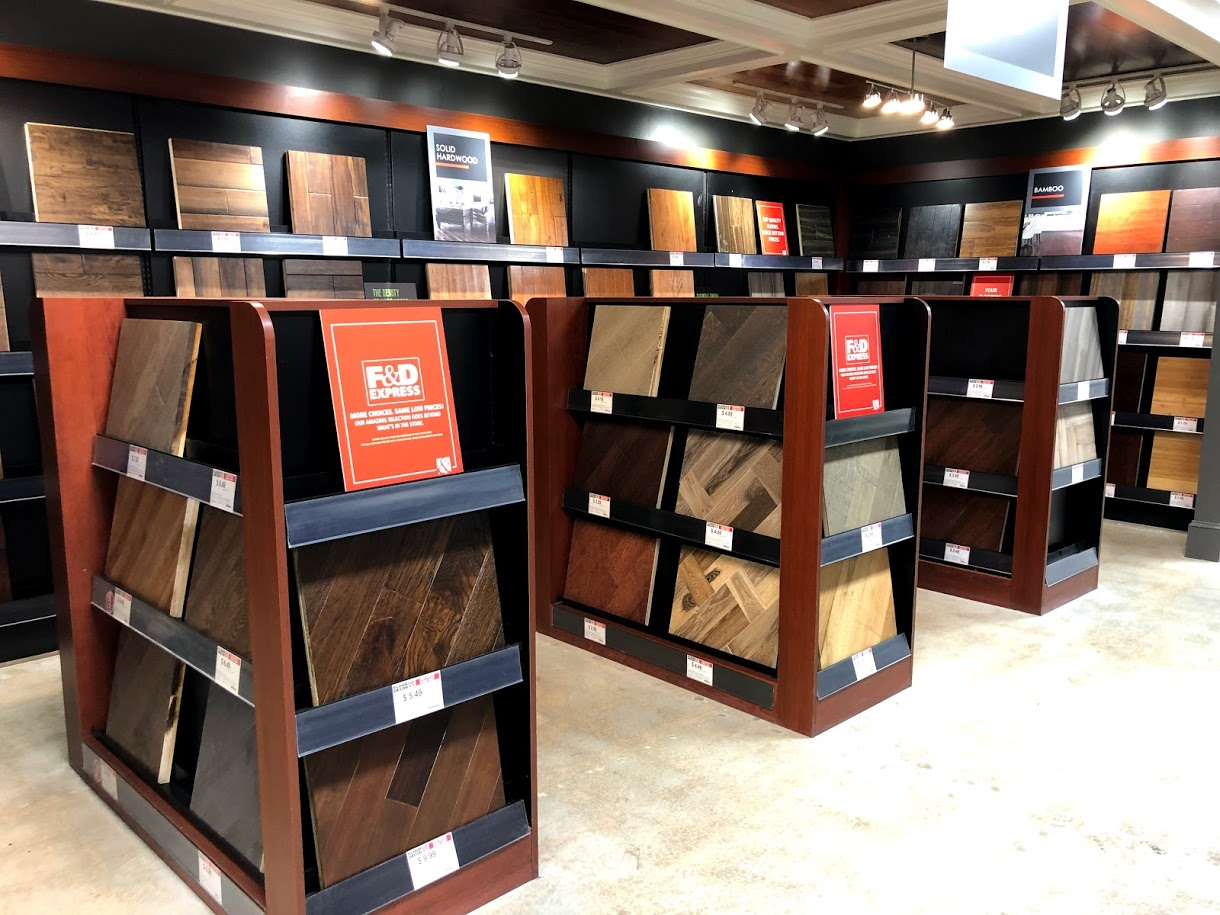
A Floor & Decor in Brookhaven, Georgia

Floor & Decor Holdings, Inc., branded as Floor & Decor, is a multi-channel American specialty retailer of hard surface flooring and related accessories that was founded in 2000 and headquartered in Smyrna, Georgia, United States (a suburb of Atlanta).

== History ==
The company was founded as FDO Holdings in 2000 by George West, whose family ran West Building Materials. The company changed its name to Floor & Decor Holdings, Inc. in April 2017.

The company doubled in size in the five years between 2011 and 2016, and revenues went from $277 million in 2011 to more than $772 million in 2016. The company had a net income of over $26 million in 2016. Floor & Decor was profitable for the five year period before its initial public offering (IPO).

In 2017, the company had its initial public offering with a 53% gain and ended up having the largest IPO increase of the year.

In February 2018, Floor & Decor opened a new 1.4 million-square-foot distribution center on a 90-acre site in Bloomingdale, Georgia, just 11 miles from the Port of Savannah.

In September 2018, Bisnow reported that Floor & Decor was expected to begin a $160 million expansion of the company that would include 17 new store locations, a possible new headquarters in Atlanta, and nearly $30M in improving its e-commerce and technology infrastructure.

In December 2023, Floor & Decor opened a new store in the New York City Metropolitan Area.

== Services ==
The company’s stores offer tile, wood, laminate, and natural stone flooring products, as well as decorative and installation accessories. The company serves professional installers, commercial businesses, and do-it-yourself customers. As of December 2021, the company operated 160 warehouse-format stores, and two small-format standalone design centers in 33 states. Floor & Decor also sells products through its online retail platform. During the first six months of 2018, the company opened five new warehouse-format stores.

Floor & Decor Holdings is listed on the New York Stock Exchange and is a constituent of the Russell 1000 index.

== Area served ==
Floor and Decor Outlets of America, Inc. operates as a subsidiary of Floor & Decor Holdings, Inc. and operates retail outlets in 28 states. The company also sells its products online.
