= Imperial Valley Mall =

- Location: El Centro, California, United States
- Coordinates: 32.763°N 115.531°W
- Address: 3451 South Dogwood Road
- Opened: March 9, 2005
- Developer: CBL & Associates
- Manager: CBRE Group
- Owner: Tryperion Holdings, Peak Companies, and Duke Real Estate
- Num. of stores: 76
- Num. of anchor tenants: 4 (3 open, 1 vacant)
- Floor area: 761,275 square feet (71,000 m^{2})
- Floors: 1 (2 in Dillard's and Macy's)
- Website: www.imperialvalleymall.com

Imperial Valley Mall is a single-level enclosed shopping mall in El Centro, California, United States. Opened in 2005, the mall features JCPenney, Dillard's, Home Improvement, and Macy's as its anchor stores. It is managed by CBRE Group.

== History ==
Sears and JCPenney were confirmed as mall tenants in 2002. The mall was approved for construction in 2003. Among the first tenants confirmed were Dairy Queen, Foot Locker, Kay Jewelers, PacSun, Payless ShoeSource, and a 14-screen UltraStar Cinemas, now a Cinemark.

It opened for business on March 9, 2005, with JCPenney, Sears, Dillard's, and Robinsons-May (now Macy's) as its four anchor stores. Sears relocated from El Centro Mall, an older mall in town. A day before the mall's opening, the owners held a "preview party" in which customers could purchase tickets to view the mall before it officially opened for business.

In 2015, Sears Holdings spun off 235 of its properties, including the Sears at Imperial Valley Mall, into Seritage Growth Properties.

On October 15, 2018, it was announced that Sears would be closing as part of a plan to close 142 stores nationwide. The store closed in January 2019.

On February 7, 2025, CBL Properties announced that they would be selling the mall for $38.1 million in an all cash deal. The mall was later acquired by a partnership of Tryperion Holdings, Peak Companies, and Duke Real Estate, marking a new chapter in its history. As part of the acquisition, the ownership group also purchased 65 acres of adjacent developable land, with plans to upgrade the mall's infrastructure and introduce new retail and dining options to better serve the community. The mall is now managed by CBRE (Coldwell Banker Richard Ellis).
