= Mark Bisnow =

American entrepreneur (born 1952)

Mark Bisnow (born August 1952) is an American entrepreneur, author and former presidential campaign aide. In 1980, he was press secretary for presidential candidate John B. Anderson. In 2005, he founded Bisnow Media, a commercial real estate news and events company. He has written two books on American politics.

== Early years ==
Bisnow grew up in Van Nuys, California. He has a BA and MA from Stanford University and a JD from Harvard Law School. Prior to starting Bisnow Media with his son Elliott in 2005, Bisnow worked in politics (US Senators Hubert Humphrey and John Heinz, US Senate Majority Leader Bob Dole and US Representative John B. Anderson), law (Latham & Watkins), transportation (assistant to the Chairman of US Air), technology (MicroStrategy and WebMethods), and business journalism (weekly columnist for the Washington Business Journal and daily business commentator for DC news radio WTOP).

== 1980 presidential campaign ==
From 1978 to 1980, Bisnow was press secretary and political advisor to Rep. John B. Anderson (R-IL) in his campaign for the 1980 Republican presidential nomination. The Wall Street Journal called him "the symbol of the Anderson campaign," and the LA Times identified him as Anderson's closest aide and the model for the campaign spokesman featured in the cartoon strip Doonesbury.

== Books ==
Bisnow's 1983 memoir of the Anderson campaign, Diary of a Dark Horse, was widely reviewed. The New Republic called it "the best book to come out of the 1980 campaign, addressing in a more engaging and revealing manner than any other questions about the power of personality in politics, the decline of the parties, and the influence of the media." The Washington Post called it "funny, gossipy, and provocative."

A second memoir by Bisnow, In the Shadow of the Dome, published in 1990, chronicled his experiences as a Capitol Hill aide in the 1970s and 80's. It was named by Washington Monthly as one of the top political books of the year.

== Digital media enterprise ==
In 2005, he founded Bisnow Media, focused on commercial real estate. By 2016, it grew to 75 employees in 29 cities in the US and Canada, publishing 40 different editions and holding 300 conferences a year for 80,000 attendees. In 2016, it was sold to Wicks Group private equity for $50 million.

== Personal life ==
Bisnow has been married since the early 1980s to former FTC Commissioner Margot Machol. They have two grown sons, Elliott and Austin Bisnow.
