= Coastal Grand Mall =

Shopping mall in Myrtle Beach, South Carolina, US

- Coastal Grand Myrtle Beach

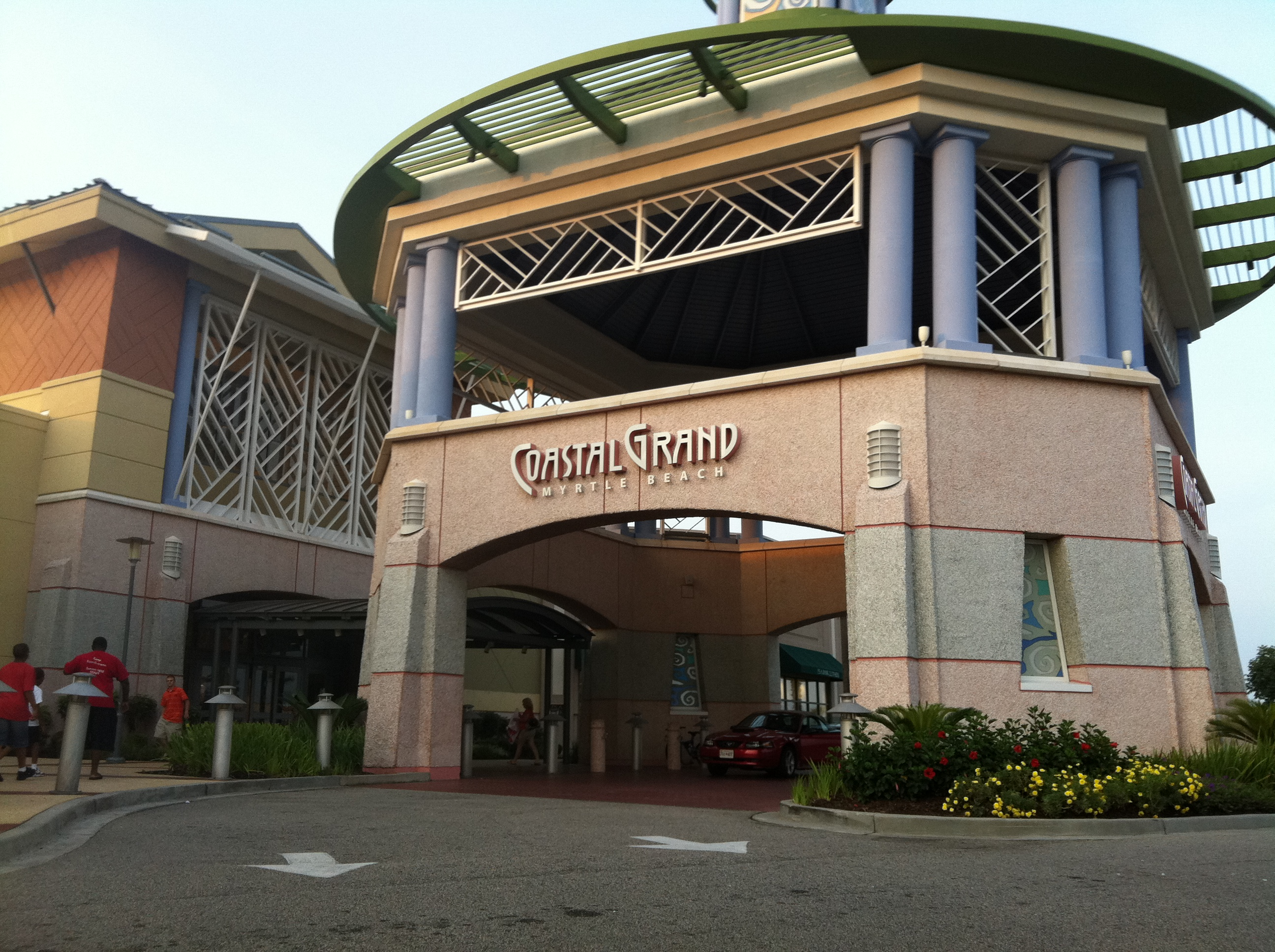
- Coordinates: 33°42′10″N 78°55′26″W
- Address: 2000 Coastal Grand Circle, Myrtle Beach, South Carolina, US
- Opened: 2004
- Previous names: The Mall of South Carolina
- Developer: CBL & Associates Properties; Burroughs & Chapin
- Manager: CBL Properties
- Owner: CBL Properties
- Num. of stores: 170+
- Num. of anchor tenants: 5 (4 open, 1 vacant)
- Floor area: 1,047,732 sq ft (97,337.5 m^{2}) GLA
- Floors: 1 (2 in Belk, Dillard's, and former Sears)
- Parking: 6,077
- Public transit: Coast RTA Route 10: Myrtle Beach Local
- Website: coastalgrand.com

Coastal Grand Mall is 1,047,732-square-foot (97,337.5 m^{2}) super-regional shopping mall is located in Myrtle Beach, South Carolina, located off of US Highway 17 and Harrelson Blvd. and was built in 2004. It is the second largest mall in the state behind the Haywood Mall in Greenville. The mall's anchors include Belk, Dillard's, and JCPenney with Dick's Sporting Goods/Golf Galaxy, Old Navy, and Books-A-Million being "junior anchors." There are over 170 specialty stores and a 14 screen Cinemark movie theater located off of the food court.

The mall carries a tropical and beach theme throughout, with a boardwalk theme in the food court. The mall also has an outside entertainment pavilion, which houses various restaurants and stores. There are also several out-parcels to the mall, including many restaurants and various other stores.

== History ==
The mall which opened in 2004, was constructed under the development of CBL & Associates Properties in partnership with Burroughs and Chapin, who also owned the former Myrtle Square Mall, which closed upon the opening of Coastal Grand. The mall was designed by the architectural firm MSTSD from Atlanta, GA. The original planned name for the mall was "Mall Of South Carolina." It quickly became the dominant mall in the Myrtle Beach area.

In March 2008, JCPenney opened a new 105,000-square-foot (9,800 m^{2}) store. This was the chain's second store in Myrtle Beach, as it continued to operate its older store at Myrtle Beach Mall, but closed in April 2020.

In 2019, Dicks Sporting Goods announced it would be relocating to a new wing near Dillard's, it also received a Golf Galaxy location as well. The former Dicks building is occupied by Wilmington, North Carolina–based Flip N Fly Trampoline Park, this is the second location of the trampoline park chain as they have a location at Mayfaire Town Center (also owned and managed by CBL Properties) in Wilmington.

On July 6, 2020, it was announced that the mall has filed a lawsuit against Bed Bath and Beyond saying that the retailer owes about $72,000 worth of rent which it hasn't paid in April, May or June. The store occupied more than 25,000 square feet of the mall. By 2023, Bed Bath and Beyond had closed down, being temporarily replaced that October by Spirit Halloween. In 2024, it was announced that Crunch Fitness would be opening a new location in the space. The grand opening was held on February 11, 2025.

On November 8, 2020, it was announced that Sears would be closing as part of a plan to close seven stores nationwide. The store closed on January 24, 2021. The Sears was temporarily a Spirit Halloween in 2025. The Sears store and the auto center stores remain vacant as of 2026.
