= Myrtle Square Mall =

Defunct mall in South Carolina, U.S.

Coordinates: 33.7069°N 78.8691°W

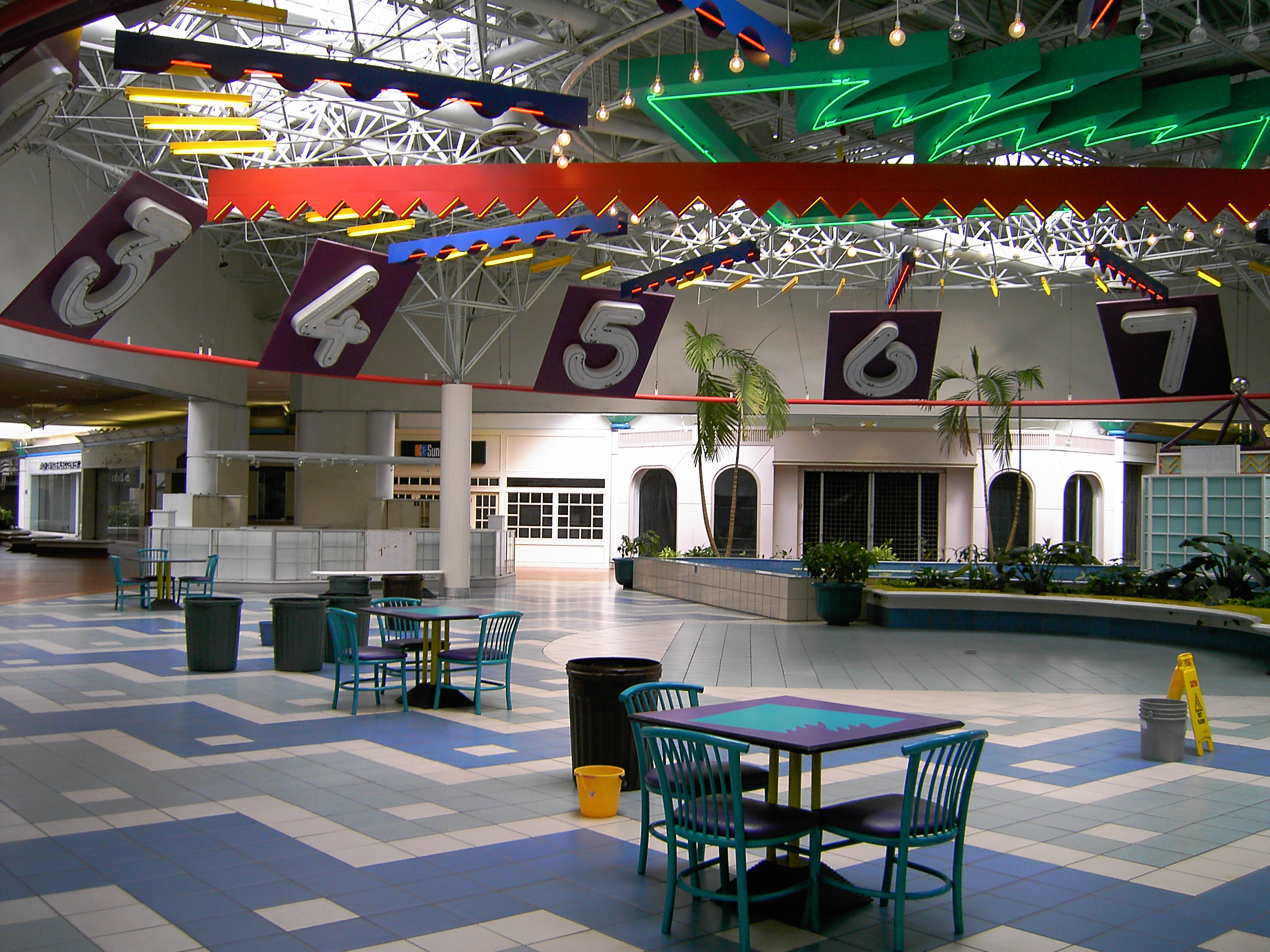
- Interior view with clock (August 2005)
- Location: Myrtle Beach, South Carolina
- Opened: April 16, 1975
- Closed: 2005
- Demolished: January–mid 2006
- Owner: Myrtle Beach Farms Company
- Num. of stores: between 80 and 90
- Num. of anchor tenants: 3
- Floor area: 442,965 sq ft (41,152.8 m^{2})
- Floors: 1
- Parking: 2,800+ spaces

Myrtle Square Mall was the first enclosed shopping mall in Myrtle Beach, South Carolina, United States. It bordered the Myrtle Beach Convention Center, Kings Highway, and Oak Street, and it was in very close proximity to residential neighborhoods and many oceanfront hotels. Its was around 442,965 square feet (41,152.8 m^{2}) set on 48 acres (190,000 m^{2}) of land. The parking lot contained more than 2,800 spaces.

== Design and construction ==
Beginning in the early 1970s, Myrtle Beach Farms Company, owner of the mall and many buildings around the Myrtle Beach area, had considered building a mall in the area. A study taken by Wilbur Smith and Associates that indicated that a shopping center was needed for the Myrtle Beach area. These results greatly added to the decision to create the Myrtle Square Mall. The mall was designed by Nelson Benzing Design Associates. Construction of the mall began in December 1973.

Besides being recognized as the first mall in the area, the mall was to be home to the reportedly world's largest clock. The clock was the mall's focal point and was the subject of many photographs from residents and tourists alike. The clock was the idea of Ezra Whittner, a member of Nelson Benzing Design Associates, based in Raleigh. The idea was different due to the beach area's unique expectations for the mall. Initially, the mall's design was based around a beach theme with waves, sand, and dunes. Since this was commonplace, a new concept was devised by Whittner with the idea of a large clock.

According to a Sun News article written in April 1975, the mall was "expected to change the shopping habits of local residents and tourists." The article went on to state that the residents of the Strand will not have to travel to Charleston, Columbia, Florence, or Wilmington. Estimates put that the mall would make $20 million in its first year. This money, which would have normally been spent in other locations, would stay in Myrtle Beach.

The new mall in Myrtle Beach was not without criticism, however. There was concern that merchants from Conway, North Myrtle Beach, Georgetown, and downtown Myrtle Beach might suffer from the cut of volume that would go to the new mall.

== Early operation ==
The mall opened to the public on April 16, 1975 with full news coverage from The Sun News. The mall's leasing manager was the Caine Company, based out of Greenville, South Carolina. It was hailed as "one of the largest and most modern shopping facilities in the Southeast" for its time with an architectural style that was quite noticeable throughout the mall. The opening began with 30 diversified retail outlets. Some of the major tenants included Belk, Collins Department Store (later to be Peebles), Eckerd Drugs, and Morrison's Cafeteria.

Initially, many of the stores in the mall were local stores instead of national chains that can be commonly found in many malls. In addition to those mentioned above, the first stores that opened with the mall included Paperback Booksmith, Playhouse Toys, Record Bar, Coker's, Candlewood, Singer's, Suzanne's, Baskin-Robbins, Bottoms Up, Curious Cargo Gifts, Kinney Shoes, Magic Cavern, Der Dog Haus, Friedman's, Gingham Peddler, Lowery Organs, Lynn's, Hallmark, Hickory Farms, Karmelkorn, La Marick, Leaf 'n Match, Merle Norman, Nelson's Men's Shop, Endicott-Johnson, and Orange Bowl. Most of these stores changed within the time span of Myrtle Square's thirty-year history, although some remained loyal and remained in the same location.

In 1976, the first Chick-fil-A in the Myrtle Beach area was opened in the mall by John Shaw, a sales manager from Greer SC. At the time, there were less than 50 of these restaurants nationwide, all in shopping malls. John served as the president of the Myrtle Square Merchants Association for most of his time there.

In order to open the mall more rapidly, half of the mall was delayed in opening until the next year as a "Phase II". Many new stores, including Sears, opened that year. It included a mail-ordering delivery destination for many of Myrtle Beach's residents when they ordered from the Sears catalog. Myrtle Beach's first attempt at an enclosed mall had been a success.

In addition, several outparcels were built around the mall. Big Star Supermarket opened on the southwest area of the complex, as well as Citizens Bank.

== Renovation ==
Over ten years had passed before any updates to the mall would take place. In those ten years, Myrtle Beach had grown extensively, and Briarcliffe Mall had opened in the Briarcliffe Acres area. To compete with shopping in the area, Myrtle Square Mall underwent a renovation. In the spring of 1985, Burroughs and Chapin began a renovation process that would take two months, beginning in February and ending in April. Some of the changes made included four additional kiosks. New stores appeared, including P-Nut Shak, Incredible Chocolate Chip Cookie Company, Things Remembered, and Nautical but Nice. In addition, all trees were replaced, and new flooring was installed. Several stores also received extensive renovations.

The large clock remained in the mall following the renovations. It, too, was updated. According to Burroughs and Chapin officials, the clock had received a large amount of use and attention that was not originally planned. Burroughs and Chapin also updated the original clock design to better accommodate shoppers.

== Later operation ==
The later 1980s and 1990s became a quiet time for Myrtle Square Mall. What was once the Coker's Department Store became the Carousel Court area by 1991. Carousel Court included a carousel area and an entertainment area. A food court was also added, replacing a landscaped entrance court located next to Sears. The food court won an International Council of Shopping Centers award in 1988 soon after it opened.

== Coastal Grand Mall ==
Burroughs and Chapin began planning a new mall in the Myrtle Beach area named Mall of South Carolina, later to be changed to Coastal Grand Mall. This mall was going to be located at the intersection of US 17 and US 501 north of Myrtle Beach International Airport. Construction work began in 2003 and the mall opened in March 2004.

== Closure ==
To some, the opening of Coastal Grand Mall meant the beginning of the end. To others, it meant that Myrtle Beach would start to come into the 21st century. The mall had not been updated for about twenty years, leaving the mall in a minor condition of disrepair. Since the mall was owned by the same owner as the new mall, Burroughs and Chapin had the power to close Myrtle Square, which would eventually happen. Most of the stores in Myrtle Square moved to the new mall in early 2004, so the mall became mostly vacant within a few weeks.

Coastal Carolina University had several of its offices in Myrtle Square, as well as the Republican Party headquarters for Horry County.

Additionally, during the mall's last year in operation, the Carousel Court area served as the temporary offices for the Department of Motor Vehicles while that agency's offices underwent renovation.

Peebles also remained inside of the mall until Labor Day of 2005. It had a liquidation sale before the store closed. The other tenants remaining also closed up shop shortly after, and the mall sat vacant for three months.

== Demolition ==
Demolition began with the removal of the blue tiles on the exterior of the former Belk building. On December 22, 2005, a request for the demolition had been filed with the Ocean and Coastal Resource Management and was subject to public comment until January 2, 2006. The work required a stormwater permit in which Burroughs and Chapin showed that debris from the demolition would not enter any waterways via stormwater.

The demolition of the mall was completed by Vereen Construction Company. A second demolition permit filed in the city of Myrtle Beach was approved on December 30, 2005. The Charleston-based company LS3P was charged with coming up with a plan on what to do with the property after the building had been demolished. City water lines and power lines were disconnected soon thereafter, and structural demolition began.

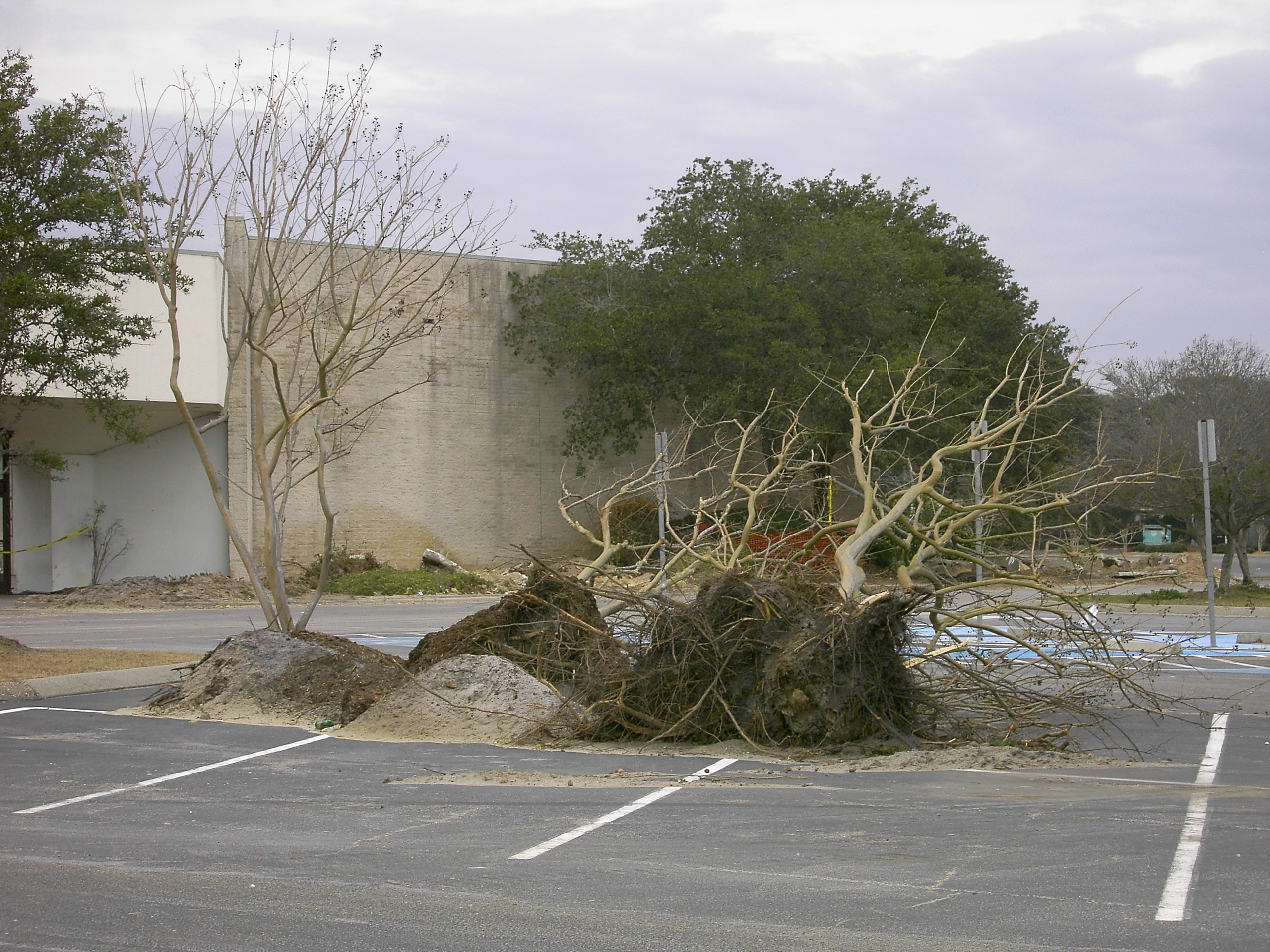
An uprooted tree outside of the former Sears building at Myrtle Square Mall in January 2006.

As of January 2006, almost all of the former Sears building had been demolished, as well as some of Phase II and the northern stores. Demolition had halted at about the center of the mall until mid-2006; the mall has since been demolished fully. Until a plan has been determined for future use of the property, the land will remain vacant.
