= Peter Linneman =

American academic and realtor

- Born: March 24, 1951 (age 75); Lima, Ohio, United States
- Education: Ashland University, University of Chicago
- Occupations: Academic, real estate investor and author, Professor Emeritus of Real Estate
- Spouse: Kathy Linneman

Peter Linneman (born March 24, 1951) is an American academic and real estate expert who is the principal of Linneman Associates, the CEO and founder of American Land Fund and of KL Realty. He previously served as the Albert Sussman Professor of Real Estate, Finance, and Public Policy at the Wharton School of the University of Pennsylvania in Philadelphia, Pennsylvania, retiring in December 2010.

Linneman served as the founding chairman of Wharton's Real Estate Department, and was the Director of Wharton's Samuel Zell and Robert Lurie Real Estate Center for 13 years. He is also the founding co-editor of the Wharton Real Estate Review. Linneman has also been named one of the 100 Most Powerful People in New York real estate according to The New York Observer and one of the 25 most influential people in commercial real estate by Realtor Magazine.

== Early years and education ==
Linneman grew up in Lima, Ohio and attended Lima Central Catholic High School. He received his bachelor's degree in economics from Ashland University in 1973 and went on to obtain his masters (1976) and Ph.D. (1977) in Economics at the University of Chicago, where he began his teaching career.

== Career ==
In his early career, Linneman began doing litigation support work in the field of anti-trust economics, and by the mid 1980s had begun focusing on commercial real estate. He has served on several public company boards, including serving on the Executive Committee of EQ Office, and was chairman of Rockefeller Center, successfully negotiating the foreclosure of its previous owners and its subsequent sale in the mid 1990s. He subsequently founded the Linneman Letter in 2001, a widely subscribed quarterly commercial real estate publication. He is the Managing Partner and cofounder of American Opportunity Zone Advisors, which invests in opportunity zones. He has been married to Kathy Linneman since 1973, with no children.

== Philanthropy ==
Along with his wife, Kathy, he founded the Save A Mind Education (SAM Elimu) 501c3 charitable foundation to support the education of destitute children in rural Kenya.

== Selected publications ==
- Real Estate Finance & Investments: Risks and Opportunities, co-authored with Bruce Kirsch, (2018) 5th edition.
- Real Estate Finance & Investments: Risks and Opportunities, (2003) 1st, (2004) 2nd, (2011) 3rd, and (2016) 4th editions.
- The Great Panic, Wharton Real Estate Review, Volume XIV, Spring 2010.
- Responsibility for and Performance of Corporate Real Estate Functions, Journal of Corporate Real Estate, co-authored with Hartmann, S., Pfnur, A., Moy, D., Siperstein, B. Volume 12 (1); 7-25, (2010).
- How Should Commercial Real Estate Be Priced? Wharton Real Estate Review, Volume XII, Spring 2008, co-authored with David Rubenstein.
- The Capital Markets Disarray, Wharton Real Estate Review, Volume XI, Fall 2007.
- View a complete list of publications here
