= Magic Giant =

Background information
- Origin: Los Angeles, California, United States
- Genres: alternative rock; Indie folk; indie pop
- Years active: 2014–present
- Labels: S-Curve; BMG; Warner Music Group; Concord; Universal
- Members: Austin Bisnow; Zambricki Li; Zang
- Past members: Jinhyuk “AJK” Kang
- Website: www.magicgiant.com

Magic Giant (stylized as MAGIC GIANT) is an American alt-rock band formed in Los Angeles, California in 2014. The group consists of Austin Bisnow (lead vocals), Zambricki Li (viola) and Zang (guitar).

Magic Giant released its debut full-length album In the Wind in 2017, and is best known for its singles "Set On Fire" and "Disaster Party" that each charted top 30 and top 25 respectively on Billboard's Alternative chart, and "Window" which charted top 40 on the Hot AC radio chart. The group has had multiple national TV appearances ranging from The Today Show to Good Morning America, and it played the Coachella festival in 2018.

The band has opened for acts such as OneRepublic, The Revivalists, Mike Posner, and Brandi Carlile, and co-headlined with American Authors.

== History ==
=== 2014–2017: Formation and EP ===
Magic Giant was formed in 2014 when songwriting partners Austin Bisnow and Zambricki Li were impressed by a video they saw of now-bandmate, Zang, salsa dancing. The group name originated as a reference from a TED Talk, in which visual artist Peter Tunney described his mentor, Jonas Salk, as a "giant", then clarifying it was not the man's physical nature he was describing, but his ability to think big. Inspired by this, the band motto became "You don't have to be big to be a giant".

In 2015, Magic Giant released its freshman self-titled EP, notably featuring Dave Matthews Band’s Rashawn Ross and Capital Cities’ Spencer Ludwig and made the debut live performance of the year on KEXP's The Morning Show hosted by John Richards. The group's song, "Let It Burn," was called "a summer festival anthem" by NPR.New Music Seminar announced Magic Giant as an 'Artist on the Verge' Class of 2015. Past artists have included Macklemore, Banks, and Fitz and the Tantrums.

In 2016, the band played festivals including Electric Forest, Wanderlust and Lightning in a Bottle and sold-out venues including the Troubadour. Billboard described its live show as "joyful" and "inspiring mass dance-alongs." The trio's song, "Set on Fire" ranked #4 on Spotify's US Viral 50 and #1 on KROQ's Locals Only, presented by radio personality, Kat Corbett. The group toured with Mike Posner, Beats Antique and Eric Hutchinson.

=== 2017–2019: In the Wind ===
The group released their debut album, In the Wind, on May 19, 2017.

The band was picked as Elvis Duran's Artist of the Month, appearing on NBC's Today show with Hoda Kotb and Kathie Lee Gifford where they performed "Set on Fire" live. The group was also chosen as ALT 98.7's Artist in Residence.

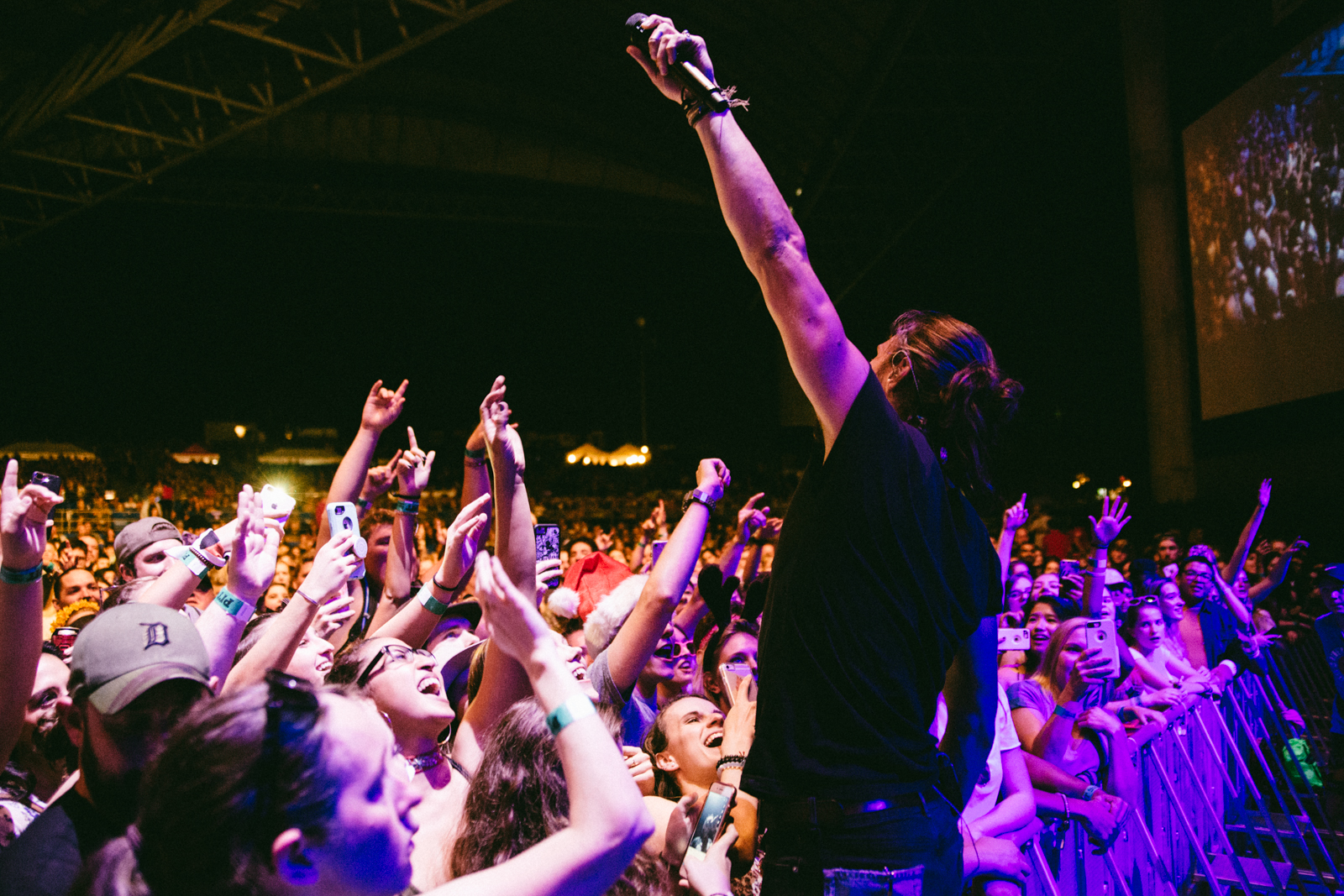
Magic Giant performing in Tampa Bay, Florida in December 2017

In June, Rolling Stone named the group one of 10 New Artists You Need to Know, calling "Set on Fire" the "perfect music festival fare." Matt Pinfield named the song his Trending Track.

"Set on Fire" had reached the top 25 on Mediabase's US Alternative Chart as of July 3, 2017.

Their newer single "Window" had reached top 40 on the Hot AC radio chart as of December 10, 2017.

The band toured with The Revivalists, Atlas Genius, and Brandi Carlile, and played summer festivals including Firefly, WayHome, and Arroyo Seco.

In 2018, the group was announced on Coachella's lineup. Billboard named Magic Giant one of the "10 Awesome Bands playing Coachella 2018".

=== 2019–2020: Disaster Party ===
In 2019, the band released "Rocketman", a collaboration with American Authors. The group released their single "Disaster Party" November 14, 2019, via S-Curve Records / BMG which had reached top 25 on Billboard's Alternative Chart as of June 13, 2020. The trio says the song was inspired by the California wildfires, noting tragedies "actually can bring people together".

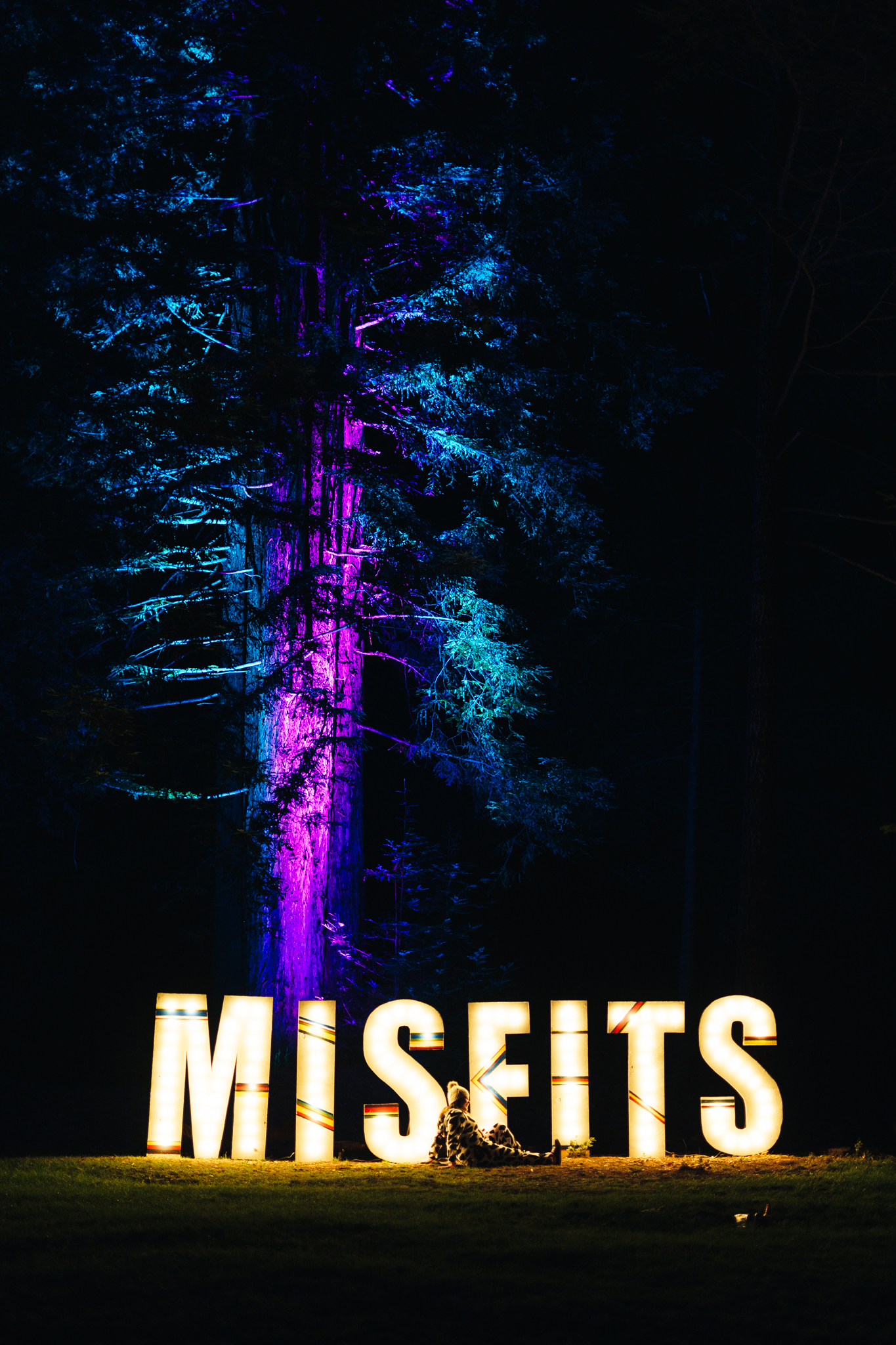
Camp Misfits 2018, Mendocino, CA

The band co-headlined a US tour with rock band American Authors.

The single made its national TV debut when the group performed it on Good Morning America.

The group created and hosted a digital music festival called Live From Quarantine, raising over $100,000 for COVID-19-related causes with guests including Woody Harrelson, Edward Norton, David Blaine, The Lumineers, and more.

=== 2021–2023: On The Pacific (Live) and The Valley ===
In December 2020, the group livestreamed a performance from a ship and subsequently released a live album along with its accompanying live film On The Pacific.

In 2022, they released their sophomore full length studio album The Valley accompanied by a 30-minute short film. The film was written, directed, and produced with Christian A. Pierce (best known for his work on The Real Bros of Simi Valley).

=== 2023–Present: We'll Always Have Paris ===
In 2023, Magic Giant released the singles "This Could Be Us" with artist Mikky Ekko (best known for his collaboration with Rihanna on "Stay") and the late poet Alan Watts; and "Strange World" featuring Laura Dreyfuss (best known for her work in Glee).

In July 2024, the band released their third length studio album We'll Always Have Paris, and their song “Window” hit 25M streams on Spotify.

In August 2024, Magic Giant opened 3 shows for OneRepublic at the brand new Ford Amphitheater in Colorado Springs, CO, becoming the first act ever to play the venue.

== Musical style and influences ==
The trio has drawn comparisons to bands such as Imagine Dragons, The Lumineers, Walk the Moon, Edward Sharpe & The Magnetic Zeros, Of Monsters and Men and Mumford & Sons. The group has cited influences including Queen, Bruce Springsteen, Julian Casablancas, John Hartford and The Avett Brothers.

== Camp Misfits ==
Camp Misfits is an annual summer-camp-style festival Magic Giant has been hosting since 2018. Set in the Redwoods of northern California, the gathering has been described as "a weekend nature retreat" and "a four day escape... with lots of music and activities". Past artists have included Drew Brown of OneRepublic, Zac Barnett of American Authors, Ben Thornewill of Jukebox the Ghost, POWERS, Victoria Canal, and comedian Danny Jolles.

== Live From Quarantine ==
From March to May 2020, during the COVID-19 pandemic, Magic Giant presented and hosted a 4-weekend digital music festival fundraiser on Instagram Live called Live From Quarantine, featuring performances and appearances from The Lumineers, Woody Harrelson, Jason Mraz, Edward Norton, Walk the Moon, The Head and the Heart, David Blaine, Hamilton's Leslie Odom Jr., Edward Sharpe, LP, MAX, Chelsea Cutler, The Revivalists, Walk off the Earth, Local Natives, Ashe, Plain White T's, Allen Stone, Shakey Graves, Nahko Bear, Thievery Corporation, American Idol's Scarypoolparty, Shaed, Mondo Cozmo, Maggie Rose, and more.

The festival raised over $100,000 for Frontline Responders Fund to get personal protective equipment to hospital workers and for MusiCares Coronavirus Relief Fund to offer grants to music industry professionals whose livelihood had been affected by the pandemic.

== Members ==
=== Austin Bisnow ===
Bisnow is lead vocals and plays synthesizer, electric guitar, and flute.

He co-wrote/produced the title track for David Guetta's Listen featuring John Legend and has written singles for artists such as Steve Aoki, Big Time Rush, Paul Oakenfold and Jon Batiste; and also played Fender Rhodes on the Billboard No. 1 (US Mainstream Top 40) Gym Class Heroes’ “Stereo Hearts" feat. Adam Levine.”

In addition, he teamed up with Grammy Award-winning producer Benny Blanco to create the non-profit, Get Well Soon Tour, whose mission is to bring joy to hospitalized children through surprise visits from superstar musicians (Bruno Mars, Justin Bieber, Maroon 5).

In June 2024, Bisnow launched the indie folk duo Somewhere In Between with his wife Deena Robertson.

=== Zambricki Li ===
Li plays viola, violin, electric guitar, banjo, harmonica, cello, mandolin, octave mandolin, dobro, lap steel and sings backing vocals for the band. When Li was 12, he got hit by a car, and when he came out of a coma a few days later, taught himself violin in a matter of days through a rare brain trauma reorganization known as Acquired Savant Syndrome. Before moving to Los Angeles, Li studied under fiddle player Buddy Spicher (Elvis Presley, Bob Dylan) and songwriter Cowboy Jack Clement (Johnny Cash, Ray Charles) in Nashville, TN. Li wrote and performed an original song for the film Paper Heart starring Michael Cera.

=== Zang ===
Brian Zaghi, professionally known as Zang, plays acoustic guitar, electric guitar, cello, upright bass, electric bass, percussion and sings backing vocals for the band. Zang is also a salsa dancer and Los Angeles native. When Zang was younger, he played upright bass in the Los Angeles Junior Philharmonic Orchestra.

== Discography ==
=== Albums ===
- 2017: In the Wind
- 2021: On The Pacific (Live)
- 2022: The Valley
- 2024: We'll Always Have Paris

=== EPs ===
- 2015: Magic Giant
- 2018: In the Wind (Acoustic)

=== Singles ===
Year	Single	Peak positions		Album
Year	Single	US Adult Pop	US Alt.	Album
2016	"Set on Fire"	—	26	In the Wind
2017	"Window"	33	—	In the Wind
2019	"Rocketman" (featuring American Authors)	—	—	Non-album singles
2019	"Disaster Party"	—	22	Non-album singles
2020	"Outta My Head"	—	—	Non-album singles
"—" denotes a recording that did not chart.
