= Summit Series (conference) =

American non-profit organization

- Formation: 2008
- Type: Conference series
- Purpose: Business networking, philanthropy
- Headquarters: Powder Mountain, Utah
- Region served: Worldwide
- Website: summit.co

Summit Series is an American organization that hosts conferences and events for young entrepreneurs, artists and activists. Events organized by the group include an annual invitation to a conference during which participants discuss topics including business practices, technological innovation, and philanthropy. Summit Series attendees have included Bill Clinton, Ted Turner and Richard Branson. Summit Series was founded in 2008 by Elliott Bisnow, Brett Leve, Jeff Rosenthal, Jeremy Schwartz, and Ryan Begelman.

Since its foundation, the organization has raised more than $2 million for charitable and non-profit organizations.

== History ==
=== Formation (2008-2013) ===
Summit Series was found in April 2008 by Elliott Bisnow, Brett Leve, Jeff Rosenthal, Jeremy Schwartz, and Ryan Begelman. The founders are involved in many operational aspects of Summit, from planning, design, and development for Summit Powder Mountain, to community curation, strategy, direction of musical and intellectual content programs.

In addition, some of the partners are Co-Directors of the Summit Action Fund, which makes investments in startups that drive positive disruptive innovation. Their portfolio includes Uber, Warby Parker, and Change.org among others. Additionally, Rosenthal serves on the Board of Advisors for Qey Capital and he was a senior advisor to The Rise Fund. Prior to starting Summit Series, Elliot Bisnow co-founded a niche industry e-newsletter business called Bisnow Media. Summit is also a GP in Learn Capital, which focuses exclusively on investments into better and smarter learning. Summit was launched with an invitation-only event organized for young entrepreneurs to meet and gain advice from one another that was hosted at a ski resort in Park City, Utah and were attended by 19 people. Later in 2008, the group held a similar gathering in Mexico. Initially, the organization did not have an official headquarters and the team moved between rented apartments in various countries worldwide.

In 2009, Summit was invited by the Obama administration to curate a meeting at the White House between senior officials and 35 young entrepreneurs. In May 2010, Summit held DC10, a three-day conference in Washington, D.C. for 750 people with participants including former President Bill Clinton, Ted Turner, and John Legend. In April 2011, the organization hosted the Summit at Sea conference, where 1,000 young entrepreneurs took a chartered cruise ship from Miami to the Bahamas for a three-day conference featuring Richard Branson, Peter Thiel, GE CMO Beth Comstock, and musical group The Roots.

=== Powder Mountain (2013-2025) ===
In April 2013, Summit purchased Powder Mountain, the largest ski resort in America, for a reported $40 million. Summit relocated its headquarters to Powder Mountain later that year. The organization hosted its first event at the resort, Summit Outside, in July 2013. Summit began developing a sustainable residential community named Summit Powder Mountain on the mountain. Plans for Summit Powder Mountain included 500 homes and a village of comparable density, a recording studio, conference lodge, startup incubator, and an innovation laboratory. The project was never developed, failed and was sold in 2023 to Reed Hastings.

In 2016, the owners of Summit Mountain Holdings Group were in debt with a foreign investment first that backed the resort in exchange for green cards. When the $120 million came due in 2021, they paid back a third of the funds. The foreign group sued Summit Mountain Holding, which countersued. The investment group sued Hastings and Summit Mountain Group for $75.9 million in July 2025, which they said was the total amount owed plus interest. In 2025, the Summit Leadership conference continued to have a mountain series of events at Powder Mountain, as well as a flagship festival.

== Operations ==
The organization’s focus is to build a community in which attendees support and inspire each other to achieve personal, business, and altruistic goals. Attendees of Summit events have included Zappos.com chief executive Tony Hsieh, music executive Russell Simmons, former football player Dhani Jones, musician Imogen Heap, and founders from YouTube, Facebook, and Twitter.

In addition to offering keynotes and discussions at its conferences, Summit offers recreational and sporting activities to participants including whitewater kayaking, skydiving, and shark-tagging.

=== Charitable activities ===
Summit Series is focused on philanthropy and has raised more than $2 million for charities and non-profits. Its charitable activities include a partnership with the United Nations to raise funds for the Nothing But Nets anti-malaria campaign. The Summit Series held an auction to support the campaign, offering a private meeting with Ted Turner and Kofi Annan to the winner, and ultimately raised more than $150,000. In July 2009, Summit Series members met at the home of Russell Simmons to brainstorm with President Clinton and to raise money for the Clinton Foundation. The event raised $265,000. Following its Summit at Sea conference in 2011, the organization raised more than $800,000 for The Nature Conservancy to create a marine protected area in the Bahamas.

=== Summit Series Action Fund ===
Summit Series invests in startup companies through its Summit Action Fund. Companies the fund has invested in include Uber, and Warby Parker.
