= Goldsboro Union Station =

Historic building in North Carolina, US

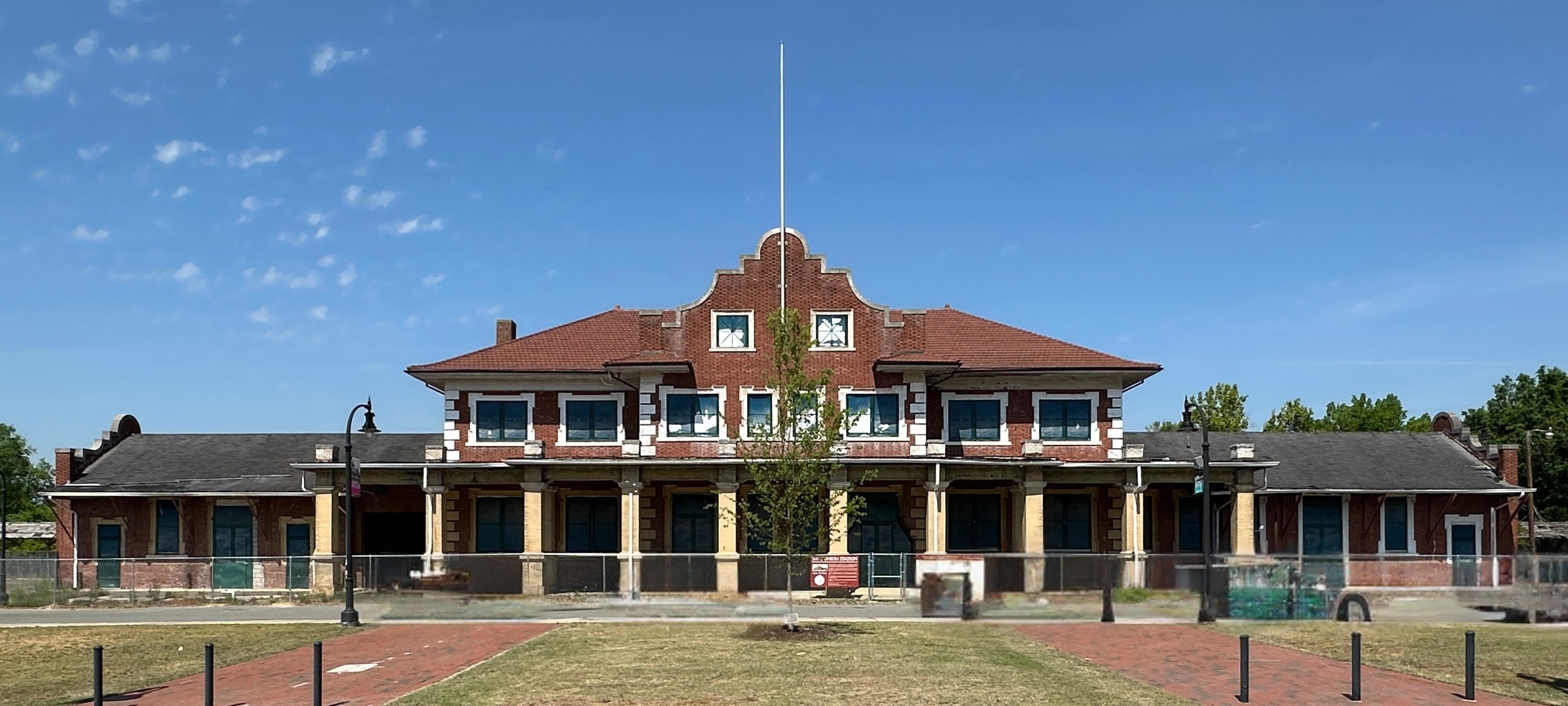
- The empty station in 2026

General information
- Location: 101 North Carolina Street; Goldsboro, North Carolina; United States
- Coordinates: 35°23′5″N 78°0′15″W
- Line: W&W Subdivision
- Platforms: 1 side platform (abandoned)

Construction
- Structure type: At-grade
- Parking: 87 spaces
- Architect: Leitner & Wilkins
- Architectural style: Eclectic

History
- Opened: 1909
- Closed: 1968
Former services
Preceding station	Atlantic Coast Line Railroad	Following station
Pikeville toward Wilson	Wilson – Wilmington	Dudley toward Wilmington
Preceding station	Southern Railway	Following station
Rose toward North Wilkesboro	North Wilkesboro – Morehead City	New Hope toward Morehead City

U.S. National Register of Historic Places
- Designated: April 13, 1977
- Reference no.: 77001015
Location

The Goldsboro Union Station is a former passenger train depot and future intermodal transit station in Goldsboro, North Carolina, United States. Originally operating from 1909 to 1968, the Eclectic two-story brick depot was preserved as one of the most ambitious railroad structures in North Carolina, built as a symbol of the importance of railroading to Goldsboro. Currently closed-off for future renovations, the five-acre (2.0 ha) facility also includes the GWTA Bus Transfer Center.

== Location ==
The station is located four blocks west, or 700 yards (640 m), from Downtown Goldsboro's Center Street, via Walnut or Mulberry streets which had been the location of the original Union Depot. Covering two full blocks, the five-acre (2.0 ha) facility is bounded by CSX tracks along with Chestnut, Mulberry, and Carolina streets. Surrounded by residential, some of the immediate properties are zoned as general business, but are not occupied.

== History ==
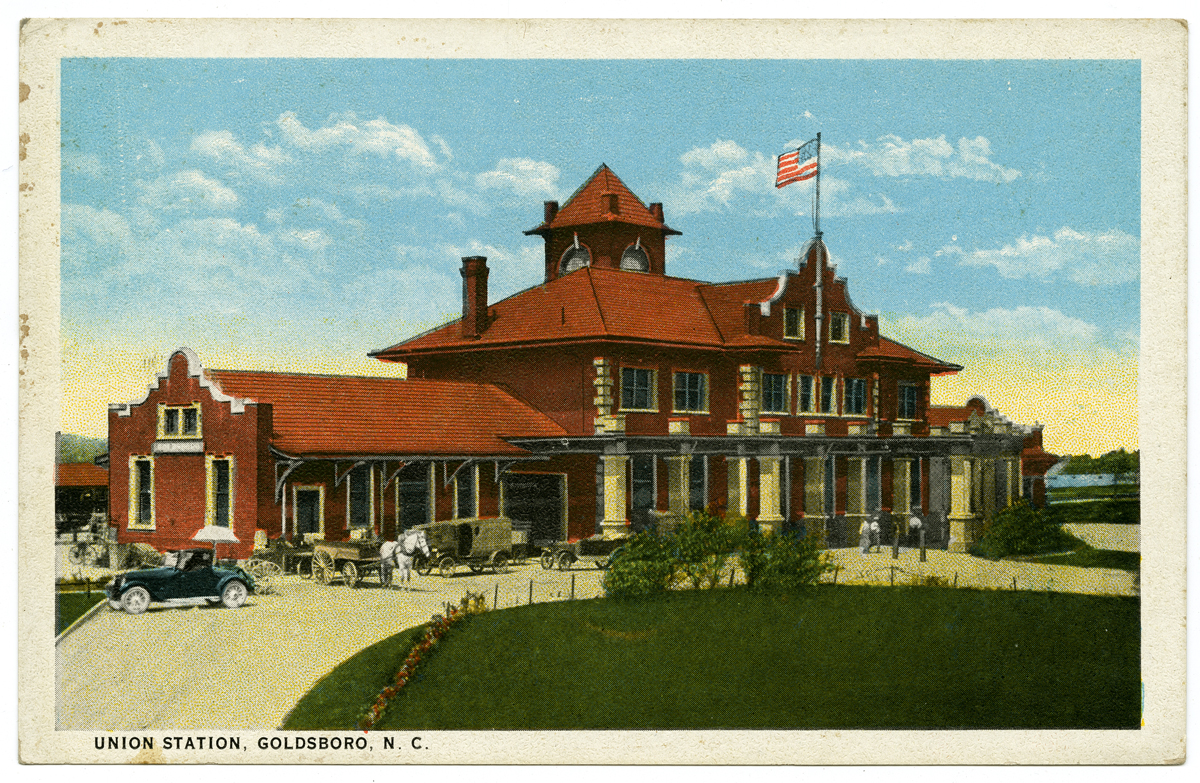
Union Station, c. 1922

On March 2, 1906, the Goldsboro Union Station Company was chartered to build a new station, which was to be a union of passenger rail services from Atlantic and North Carolina, Atlantic Coast Line (ACL), and Southern railroads. Formerly, all three railroads had their own separate freight operations immediately north of downtown with a small Union Depot in the middle of downtown. The site selected was at the foot of Walnut Street on a spur line that bypassed west of downtown. Construction began in August 1907 and was completed in June 1909, at a cost $72,024. The architectural design is credited to J.F. Leitner's firm, Leitner & Wilkins. It is a two-story brick building, seven bays wide and two bays deep, with a hip roof, flanked by one-story gabled brick wings. It features a three-story central tower and one-story front and rear porches.

The ACL operated trains on the former Wilmington and Weldon Railroad between Wilmington (the original headquarters of the ACL) and a point near Wilson, where a connection was made to the Richmond–Florida main line. The Southern Railway operated passenger trains such as the northern branch of the Cincinnati-bound Carolina Special from Goldsboro through Raleigh and Durham to Greensboro. Into the early 1950s the Atlantic and East Carolina Railway ran a daily passenger train from Goldsboro, North Carolina southeast to Morehead City on the Crystal Coast. The last passenger train to use Goldsboro Union Station was discontinued in 1968. That train was a Rocky Mount station - Wilmington Union Station Seaboard Coast Line route that originated in connection with the Champion southbound, and the Palmetto northbound.

Goldsboro Union Station was listed on the National Register of Historic Places in 1977, by that time the property changed hands several times and was currently owned by Goldsboro Builders Supply.

On August 17, 2007, the North Carolina Department of Transportation (NCDOT) announced that it had purchased the facility and adjoining acreage to preserve and adaptively reuse as a modern multimodel center. After providing stabilization of the historic building, NCDOT passed ownership to the City of Goldsboro in December 2008.

In August 2014, construction began on the Gateway Transfer Center, a bus station located north-end of the property. It was opened in September 2015 and was renamed the GWTA Bus Transfer Center.

== GWTA Bus Transfer Center ==
GWTA Bus Transfer Center

General information
- Location: 103 North Carolina Street; Goldsboro, North Carolina; United States
- Coordinates: 35.38575°N 78.00335°W
- Owner: City of Goldsboro
- Bus stands: 9
- Bus operators: GWTA
- Connections: Amtrak Thruway

Construction
- Structure type: At-grade
- Accessible: Yes

Other information
- Station code: Amtrak: GBO

History
- Opened: September 2015
Location

The GWTA Bus Transfer Center is a bus station located at Goldsboro Union Station and serves as a bus terminus for the Goldsboro–Wayne Transportation Authority (GWTA) and provides intercity bus service via Amtrak Thruway.

=== Services ===
The facility includes a 4,800 square foot (450 m^{2}) building with tickets/information, restrooms, waiting area, nine bus bays, and parking for 18 GWTA vans. Free same-day parking is located on the south-end of the Goldsboro Union Station property.

GWTA operates the following routes from the Transfer Center:

- Purple Route – County Courthouse, Seymours Homes, Lincoln Holmes, and AMF Bowiling
- Yellow Route – HV Brown Homes, Goldsboro High School, Peggy Seegars Senior Center, and Carlie C's
- Blue Route – Dept. of Social Services/Health Dept., Peggy Seegars Senior Center, Walmart/Spence, and Berkeley Mall/Berkeley
- Green Route – Wayne UNC Health Care, Wayne Community College, and Maxwell Center
- Red Route – Dollar General, Walmart on US 70, and Little River Shopping Center
- Mount Olive Connector

Amtrak Thruway service connects with the Carolinian and Palmetto, via Wilson station; Bus #6190 departs at 12:24pm and Bus #6189 arrives at 3:40pm.
