= Joseph F. Leitner =

American architect

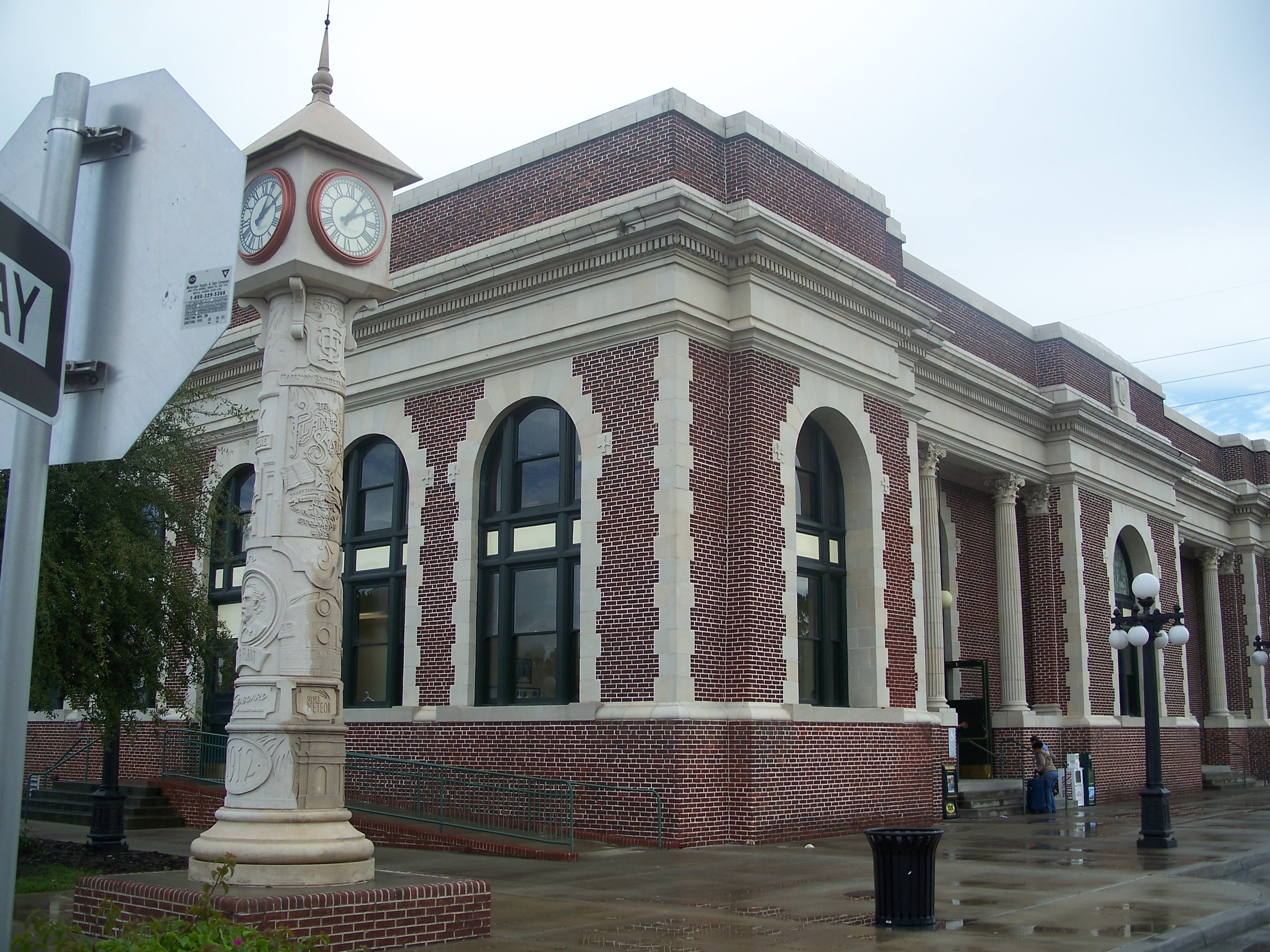
Tampa Union Station in Tampa, 2007

Joseph Florence Leitner (June 13, 1871 – June 2, 1930) was an American architect whose work includes several rail stations. In Columbia, South Carolina he worked for Charles Coker Wilson (beginning in 1901) for five years. Later he partnered with William J. Wilkins (architect), first in Florence, South Carolina (completing work in Alabama, Georgia, the Carolinas, Florida, and Tennessee) and then in an office in Wilmington, North Carolina, where Leitner practiced for a decade. to form Leitner & Wilkins. His work included commercial, educational, fraternal religious, industrial, residential, and transportation buildings in Colonial Revival architecture, Flemish architecture (especially gables, Italianate architecture and Romanesque Revival architecture styles. He ended his career in Florida.

Leitner was born in Augusta, Georgia. His parents were Major Henry Daniel Leitner and Annie E. Jackson. He attended Emory College School of Technology, which later became Georgia Tech. He began his career in 1893 with Albert Wheeler Todd in Augusta, practicing as part of Todd and Leitner, before establishing his own practice. He married Marie (Birdie) Zachary of Augusta in 1895.

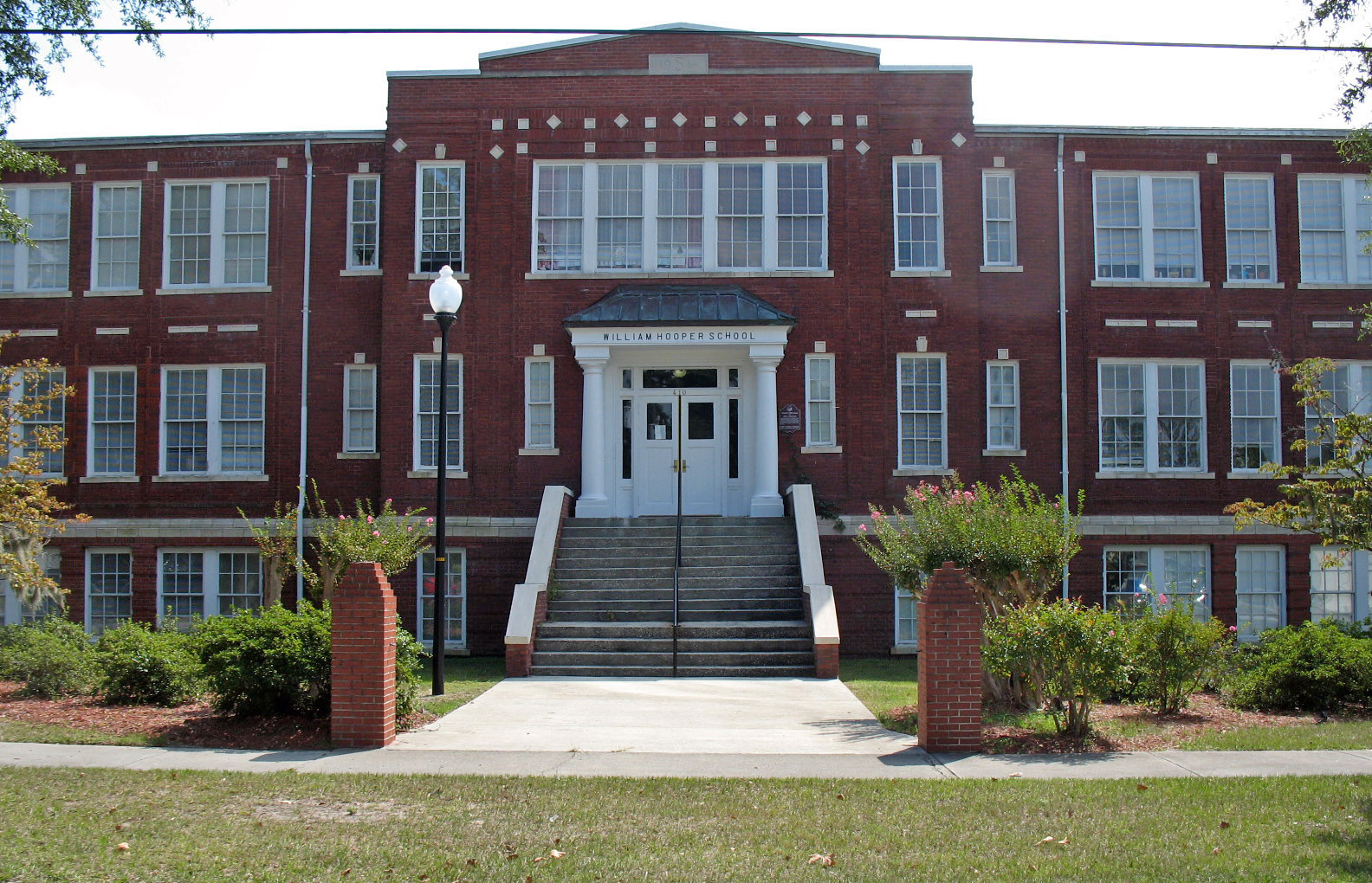
William Hooper School in Wilmington, North Carolina, 2009

Leitner moved to South Carolina and then North Carolina, where he spent at least 10 years in Wilmington, North Carolina starting in 1906. He worked out of the Southern Building.

From 1909 through 1912, Leitner was the official architect for the Atlantic Coast Line Railroad Company doing work in Wilmington, Rocky Mount, and Fayetteville and other locations. He served two terms as president of the North Carolina Architectural Association and was a member of the North Carolina Board of Architecture.

He designed the Ricks Hotel in Rocky Mount and the Atlantic Coast Line Railroad YMCA. His biggest project in North Carolina were Wilmington's Union Station (demolished in 1970, although a community college building modelled on the original is planned) the Atlantic Coast Line Office Building. A cold storage plant was also planned. Other designs included the Winston-Salem Southbound Freight Depot.

He designed the Thomas M. Emerson House (also known as the Emerson-Kenan House) in the Carolina Heights neighborhood for ACL's president. Other work included:

- Wiggins Building (1910)
- Wilmington Savings and Trust Building (1910)
- Atlantic Trust and Banking Building (1911)
- Cape Fear Club (1912-1913), as supervising architect, a brick Neoclassical Revival building at 206 Chestnut Street in Wilmington, North Carolina
- Joseph H. Hinton House, Wilmington (1913), on Market Street, in 1913
- William Hooper School (1914).

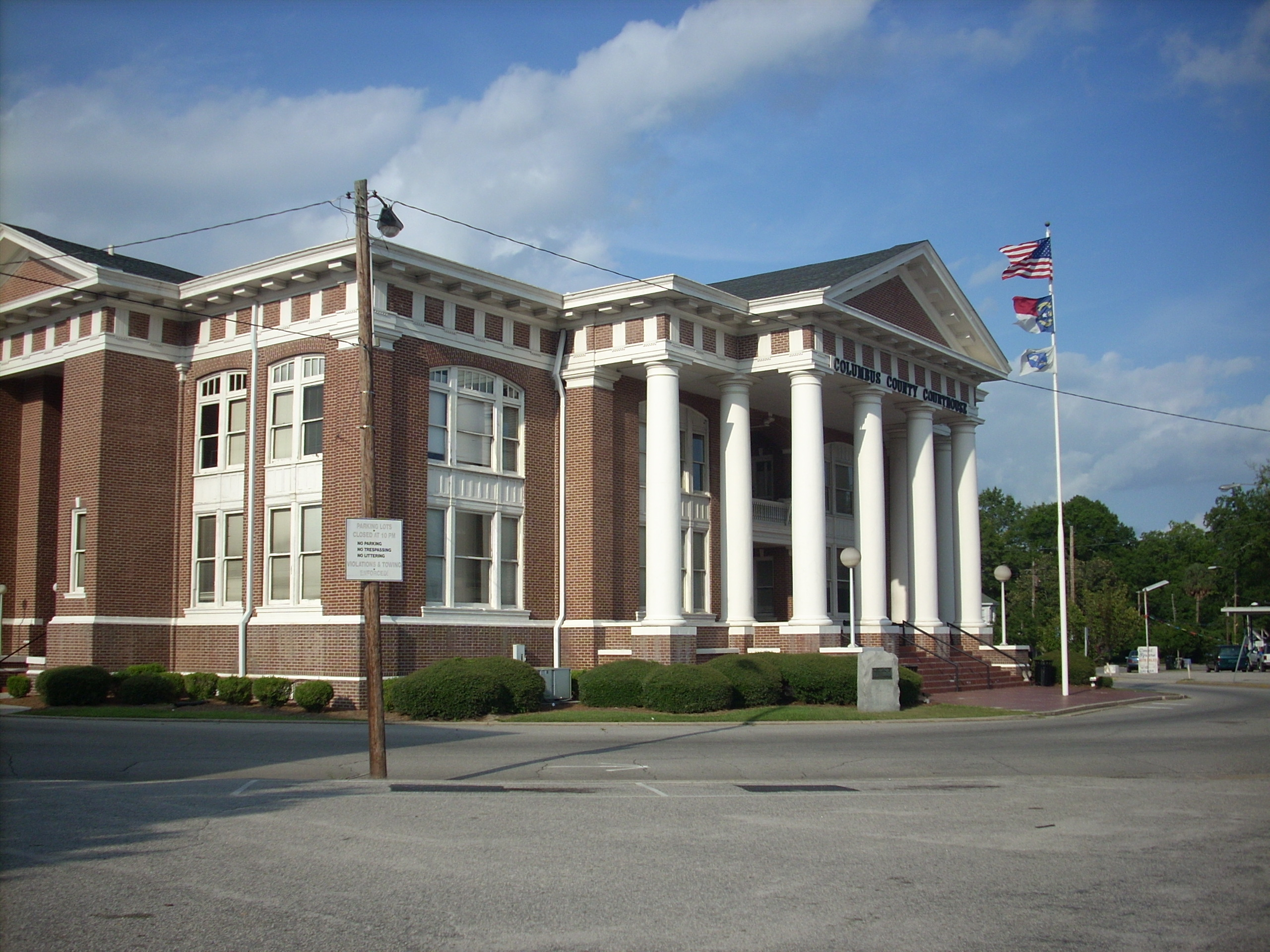
Columbus County Courthouse in Whiteville, North Carolina

Outside of Wilmington his work included:

- Several schools including three in Fayetteville in 1911 and others in Charlotte
- Columbus County Courthouse (1914-1915) in Whiteville
- R. E. L. Brown House in Chadbourn, a Southern Colonial architecture residence
- Lumberton Hotel (1914)
- Mitchell Elementary School, Charleston, SC

He opened an office in Atlanta in 1917 with architect C. P. Niederhauser, who had worked in Jacksonville, Florida, and then joined the Atlanta firm of Edwards and Sayward (William Augustus Edwards and William J. Sayward). He may have worked in St. Petersburg, Florida in the firms of Leitner and Henson (1926) and Brown and Leitner (1927). By 1930 he was living in Tampa, Florida, where he designed bridges. He died June 2, 1930. He is buried in Harlem Memorial Cemetery in Harlem, Georgia .

He was also assigned to design the C. & W. C. station in Georgia.

His works listed on the U.S. National Register of Historic Places include:

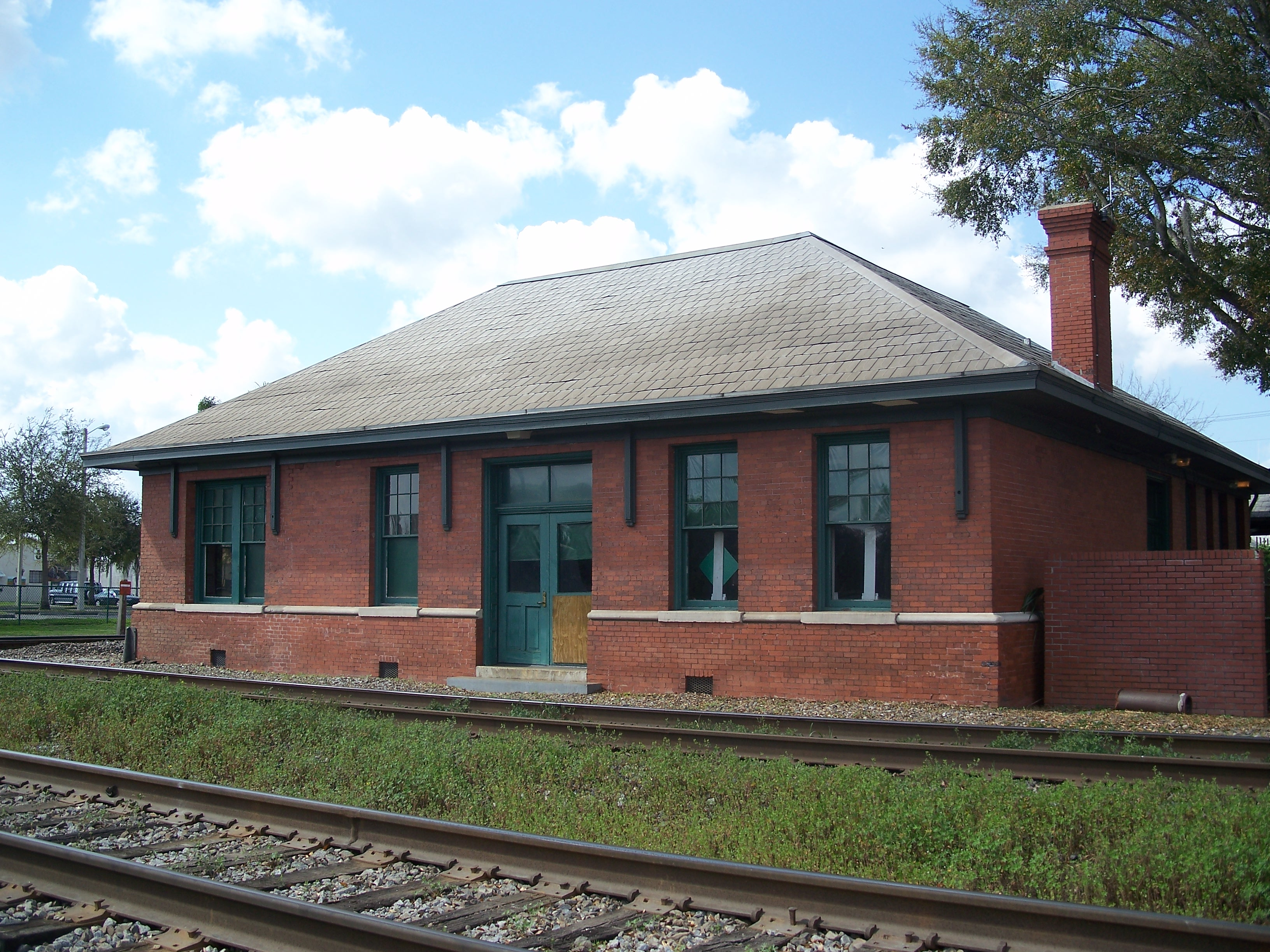
Plant City Union Depot in Plant City, Florida, 2011

- Atlantic Coast Line Depot (Florence, South Carolina) (commissioned 1907), also known as the Florence Passenger Station
- Columbus County Courthouse, Bounded by Madison and Jefferson Sts. circle Whiteville, NC Leitner, Joseph F.
- Conway Methodist Church, 1898 and 1910 Sanctuaries, Fifth Ave. Conway, SC Leitner, Joseph
- Goldsboro Union Station (commissioned 1907 and built in 1909), 101 North Carolina St. Goldsboro, NC Leitner & Wilkins
- William Hooper School (Former) (1914), 410 Meares St. Wilmington, NC Leitner, Joseph F.
- Plant City Union Depot, E. North Drane St. Plant City, FL Leitner, J.F.
- Tampa Union Station, 601 N. Nebraska Avenue Tampa, FL Leitner, J.F.
