= W&W Subdivision =

Railway line in North Carolina

The W&W Subdivision is a railroad line owned by CSX Transportation in the U.S. state of North Carolina. The line today runs from just south of Wilson, North Carolina, to Wallace, North Carolina, for a total of 69.1 miles. At its north end the line connects to CSX's A Line (South End Subdivision). The line's name stands for the Wilmington and Weldon Railroad, the company that originally built the line.

== History ==
The Wilmington and Weldon Railroad was completed in 1840 and was the longest railroad in the world at the time of its completion. In 1899, the Wilmington and Weldon Railroad was merged into the Atlantic Coast Line Railroad (ACL). The Atlantic Coast Line would incorporate the Wilmington and Weldon's main line north of Contentnea (just south of Wilson) into their A Line. The rest of the line south of that point would become the Contentnea—Wilmington Line (C Line), one of the company's secondary main lines. The line would continue to provide service to the port city of Wilmington, North Carolina where the ACL was headquartered from 1900 to 1960.

In 1909, the ACL realigned the track in Goldsboro to bypass the center of town in conjunction with the opening of Goldsboro Union Station. The line's original alignment along Center Street was removed in 1925.

By 1949, two daily round-trip passenger trains and a daily through freight train were running the Contentnea—Wilmington Line on their way from Rocky Mount to Wilmington. An additional local freight train ran the line six days a week at the same time.

In 1967, the ACL merged with its rival, the Seaboard Air Line Railroad (SAL), who also served Wilmington via a line that originated in Hamlet (the Wilmington Subdivision). The merged company was named the Seaboard Coast Line Railroad (SCL), who designated the line as the W&W Subdivision. By then, only freight trains were running the line.

In 1980, the Seaboard Coast Line's parent company merged with the Chessie System, creating the CSX Corporation. The CSX Corporation initially operated the Chessie and Seaboard Systems separately until 1986, when they were merged into CSX Transportation. Also in 1986, CSX abandoned the W&W Subdivision from Wilmington to Wallace, where the line terminates today. The Wilmington Subdivision is now CSX's only line serving Wilmington.

== Clinton Spur ==
The Clinton Spur line runs from Warsaw to Clinton for a total of 11.3 miles. Most of the spur is owned and operated by CSX. The end of the spur (approximately 3.53 miles of rail line between milepost 199.0 in Moltonville, NC, and the end of the track at milepost 202.53 in Clinton, NC) was owned and operated by the Clinton Terminal Railroad Company (CTR), originally as the Clinton Division of the Waccamaw Coast Line, from July 1994 until August 2023. Regional Rail announced at the beginning of August 2023 that it had acquired the CTR, and that it would continue to operate, now as the Clinton Branch of the Carolina Coastal Railway (CLNA), a local Class III railroad acquired by Regional Rail in 2020. This “new” branch does not directly connect with any other trackage of the CLNA, relying instead on interchange with CSX in Moltonville. The Clinton Spur was originally built as the Wilmington and Weldon Railroad's Clinton Branch in 1887.

== Historic Atlantic Coast Line stations ==
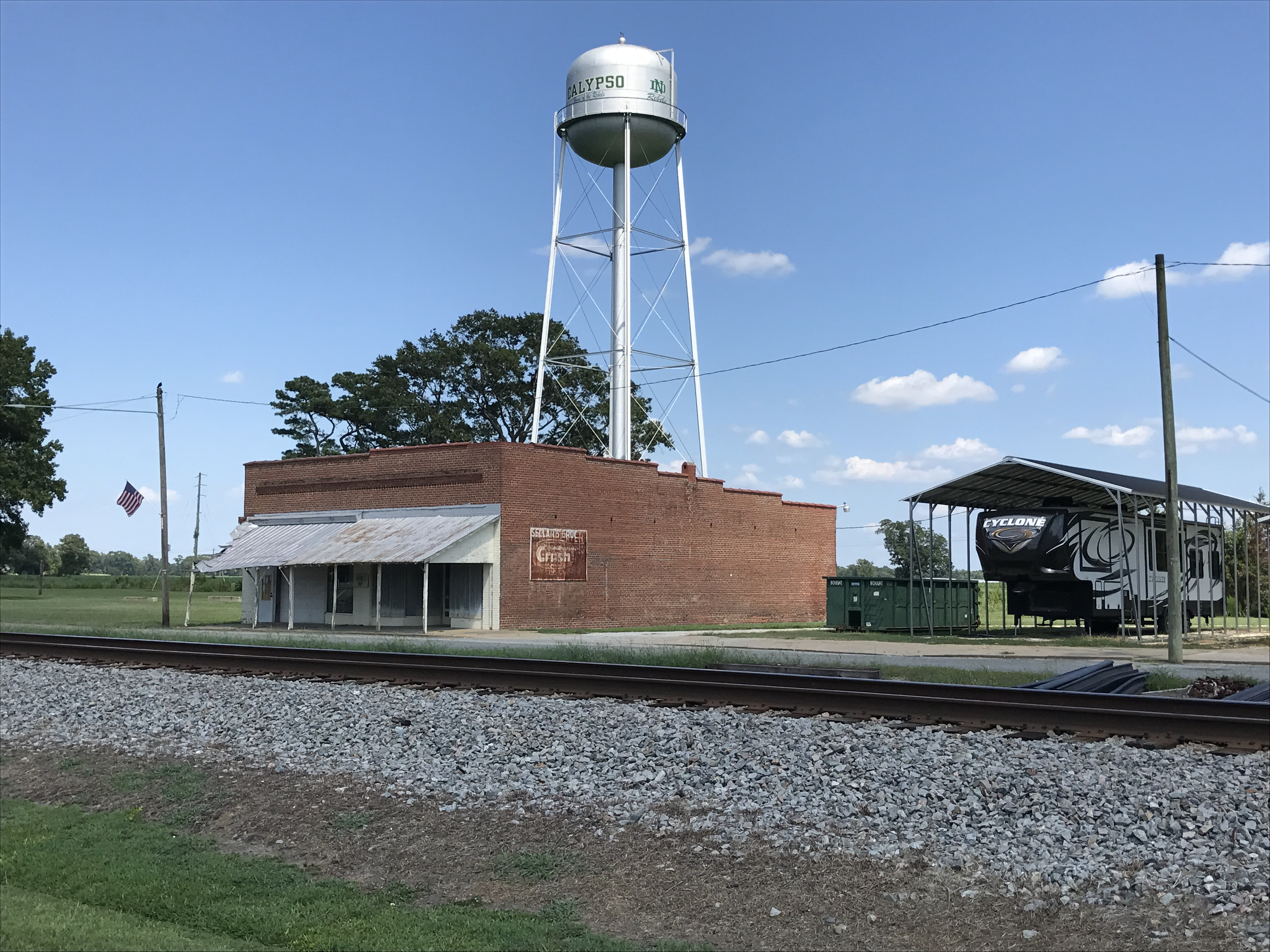
The W&W Subdivision as it passes through Calypso, North Carolina.

Contentnea to Wilmington
Milepost	City/Location	Station	Connections and notes
AC 138.9		Contentnea	junction with Atlantic Coast Line Railroad Main Line
AC 141.9	Black Creek	Black Creek	
AC 148.6	Fremont	Fremont	also known as Nahunta
AC 152.1	Pikeville	Pikeville	
AC 159.8	Goldsboro	Goldsboro Union Station	junction with: Midland Branch; North Carolina Railroad (SOU); Atlantic and North Carolina Railroad (SOU)
AC 161.4	Goldsboro	Royall Yard	
AC 168.5	Dudley	Dudley	named for Governor Edward Bishop Dudley, founder of the Wilmington & Weldon Railroad
AC 173.5	Mount Olive	Mount Olive	
AC 177.2	Calypso	Calypso	
AC 180.4	Faison	Faison	
AC 184.6		Bowden	
AC 188.8	Warsaw	Warsaw	junction with Clinton Branch
AC 196.5	Magnolia	Magnolia	
AC 201.7	Rose Hill	Rose Hill	
AC 205.8	Teachey	Teachey	
AC 208.1	Wallace	Wallace	originally known as Duplin Roads
AC 211.5	Willard	Willard	originally known as Leesburg
AC 214.7	Watha	Watha	
AC 221.4	Burgaw	Burgaw	
AC 226.5		Ashton	
AC 229.5	Rocky Point	Rocky Point	
AC 235.4	Castle Hayne	Castle Hayne	
AC 239.7	Wrightsboro	Wrightsboro	
AC 241.1		Gordon	
AC 242.5	Wilmington	Smith Creek Yard	
AC 243.1	Wilmington	New Bern Junction	junction with Atlantic Coast Line Railroad New Bern Branch
AC 243.6	Wilmington	Wilmington Union Station	junction with Atlantic Coast Line Railroad Wilmington—Pee Dee Line

Clinton Branch
Milepost	City/Location	Station	Connections and notes
ACA 188.8	Warsaw	Warsaw	junction with the Contentnea—Wilmington Line
ACA 194.4		Turkey	
ACA 195.8		Elliott	
ACA 202.5	Clinton	Clinton	

== See also ==
- List of CSX Transportation lines
