= Hwy 55 Burgers Shakes & Fries =

American restaurant chain

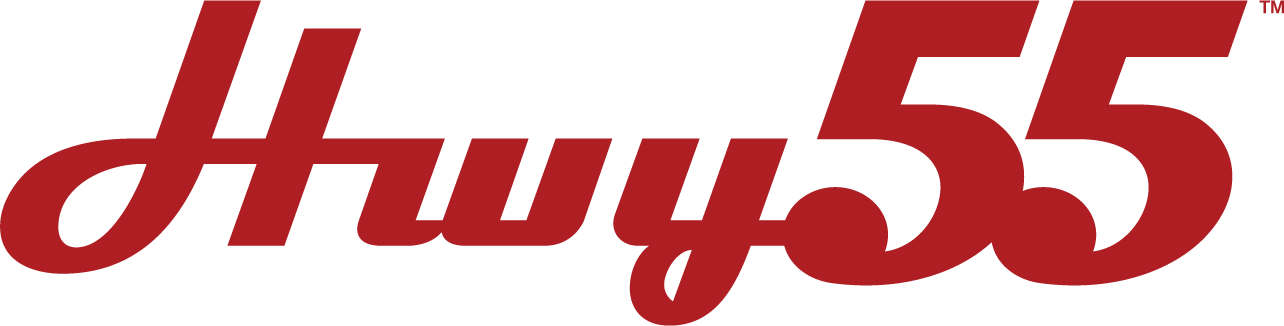
- Logo used since February of 2019.

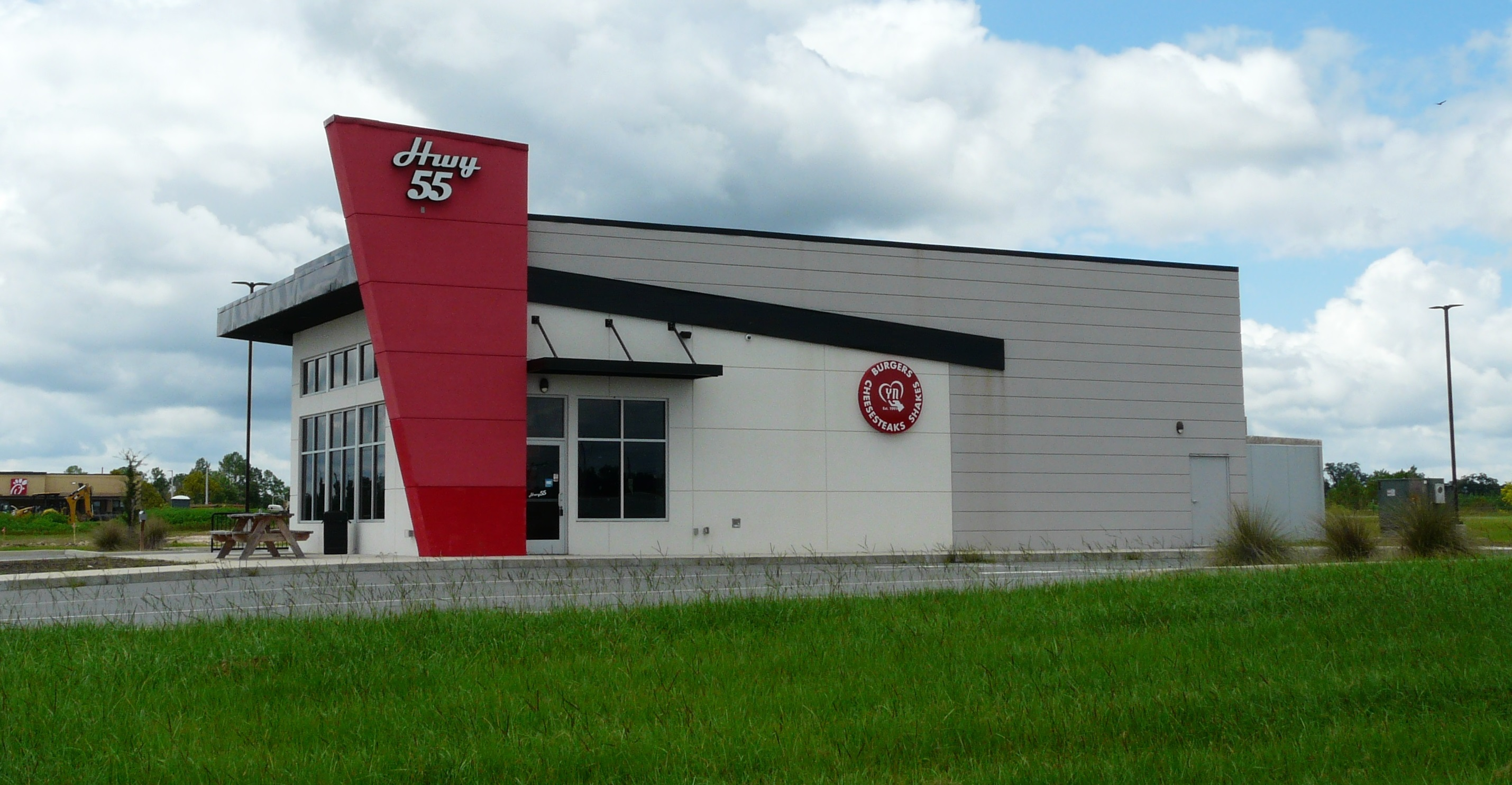
- Location in Live Oak, Florida
- Type: Private
- Industry: Restaurants
- Genre: Fast casual restaurant
- Founded: Andy's Cheesesteaks & Cheeseburgers: 1991; 35 years ago Goldsboro, North Carolina; Hwy 55 Burgers Shakes & Fries: February 2012; 14 years ago
- Founder: Kenney Moore
- Headquarters: 102 Commercial Ave; Mount Olive, North Carolina, United States,
- Number of locations: 108 (2022)
- Area served: United States
- Key people: Kenney Moore (CEO); Neal Dennis (COO)
- Products: Hamburgers; Frozen custard; French fries; Soft drinks; Milkshakes; Cheesesteaks
- Website: www.hwy55.com

Hwy 55 Burgers Shakes & Fries is a fast casual restaurant chain that operates primarily in the state of North Carolina and other neighboring states on the east coast of the United States. Founded by Kenney Moore as Andy's Cheesesteaks and Cheeseburgers, the first location opened in Goldsboro, North Carolina, in 1991. In 2012, seeking to expand beyond North Carolina, the company changed their name to Hwy 55 and opened their first out-of-state restaurant in May of that year. As of February, 2022, the chain has a total of 49 locations in the United States, primarily in North Carolina (47), with 2 other locations in Florida and Tennessee The restaurant serves hamburgers, cheesesteaks, sandwiches, salads, hand-dipped ice cream and milkshakes.

== History and operations ==
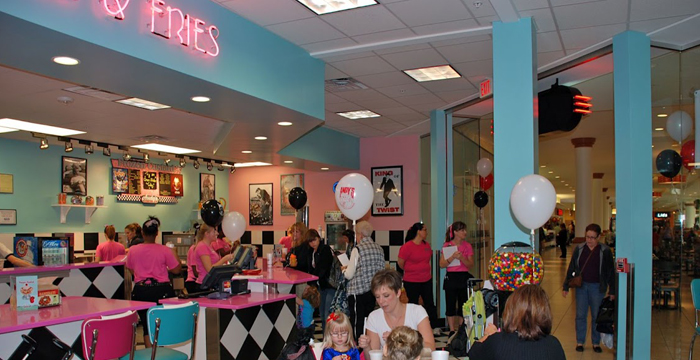
A former Hwy 55 in Raleigh, North Carolina's Crabtree Valley Mall, since closed.

Former logo, still seen at multiple locations

Kenney Moore began the business in 1991 by opening a now-defunct restaurant in Goldsboro, North Carolina's Berkeley Mall. He asked the owners of his equipment to in-house finance his operation as he only had $500 to his name. Moore quickly acquired three more closed restaurants and found himself $30,000 in debt to his foodservice distributor. After adapting Robert K. Greenleaf's philosophy of servant leadership, his fortunes turned. Moore switched to a franchisee style of ownership and Andy's Cheesesteaks and Cheeseburgers expanded throughout Eastern North Carolina.

In February 2012, Andy's announced that it had changed its name to Hwy 55 Burgers, Shakes & Fries, as a means to avoid potential lawsuits with other similarly named restaurants, once it decided to expand outside of North Carolina. The name is a homage to North Carolina Highway 55, and many of the locations in the state were painted with a mural map showing the route of the highway. The company's decor, always influenced by 1950s-era diners, also took on a pink-and-teal color scheme. In May, the company opened a franchised store in Myrtle Beach, South Carolina, the first location outside the state of North Carolina. The first international locations followed in 2014 with openings in Abu Dhabi. The Abu Dhabi location later closed.

In 2013, Hwy 55 was named a top-40 food franchise by the Franchise Business Review.

By February 2022, the chain had 108 locations in nine U.S. states, including North Carolina (81), South Carolina (12), Tennessee (6), Georgia (2), Texas (2), Montana (1), Ohio (1), Virginia (1) and West Virginia (1).

On December 31, 2024, The Little Mint, Inc., parent company of Hwy 55, filed for Chapter 11 bankruptcy protection. Locations are expected to remain open throughout the procedure.

== Restaurants ==
A Hwy 55 restaurant usually has a 1950s theme, with pink-and-teal color accents and '50s decor mounted on the walls. Kitchens are open, whereby customers can watch cooks grill their food.

== Charity ==
In 2006, Kenney Moore created the Andy's Charitable Foundation, Inc. as a 501(C)3 corporation with the "mission to serve the common good of all people in our hometowns." Now known as the Hwy 55 Foundation, as of 2021, it had raised over $1,900,000 for local charities, including the Miracle League of the Triangle, of which it is a major sponsor. A Miracle League field in Cary, North Carolina is named after the foundation.
