= 1909 Georgia Railroad strike =

American labor strike

Georgia Railroad strike of 1909
- Georgia race strike
- Date: May 17–29, 1909
- Location: Georgia, United States
- Caused by: Resentment from white firemen over the hiring of African Americans
- Result: Equal pay for African American and white firemen

Parties
White firemen from the Georgia Railroad; Brotherhood of Locomotive Firemen and Enginemen	Georgia Railroad

The Georgia Railroad strike of 1909, also known as the Georgia race strike, was a labor strike that involved white firemen working for the Georgia Railroad that lasted from May 17 to May 29. White firemen, organized under the Brotherhood of Locomotive Firemen and Enginemen (B of LF&E), resented the hiring of African American firemen by the railroad and accompanying policies regarding seniority. The labor dispute ended in Federal mediation under the terms of the Erdman Act, with the mediators deciding in favor of the railroad on all major issues.

== Background ==
In Fall 1902, the Georgia Railroad began hiring African Americans as firemen for some of their longer routes. They were hired at considerably lower wages than white firemen, and their hiring increased during the depression of 1907. By April 1909, African Americans made up about 42% of the total firemen working for the railroad. The average pay for a white firemen was $1.75 per day, while African American firemen were paid $1.25 per day. Furthermore, the railroad allowed full seniority rights to the African American firemen, but denied them the opportunity to be promoted to the position of railroad engineer. The effect of this was that many of the African American workers accumulated more seniority than their white firemen counterparts, allowing them the choice of more profitable runs.

By early 1909, tensions began to rise among the white firemen of the Georgia Railroad, many of whom were members of the Brotherhood of Locomotive Firemen and Enginemen (B of LF&E), an all-white labor union. In April, Eugene A. Ball, the union's vice president, visited Georgia and urged the railroad to change its policies. A critical development occurred on April 10, as ten white firemen had been fired by the Atlanta Terminal Company and replaced by African American workers at lower wages. Ball mistakenly believed that the general manager of Georgia Railroad was also a board member of the Atlanta Terminal Company, and as such believed the firings constituted a significant enough event to warrant further action. On May 13 and 14, Ball oversaw near unanimous voting in favor of a labor strike.

== Course of the strike ==
On May 17, eighty firemen, all white members of the brotherhood, went on strike against the Georgia Railroad. As part of the strikers' demands, they called for the ten white workers to be rehired by the Atlanta Terminal Company and for the railroad to cease its replacement of white workers with African Americans. The Georgia Railroad was open about its policy of hiring African Americans for lower wages and attacked the union for attempting to remove African Americans from employment on railroads. Early on, the railroad attempted to attack Ball as an instigating outsider, highlighting the fact that he was Canadian. Ball responded that he was both a Canadian and a white man who stood "for a white man's country".

Attempting to break the strike, the railroad ran freight trains fired entirely by black workers, many of whom faced violence from mobs along the line. Shortly after the outbreak of the strike, Ball published an open letter in The Atlanta Constitution attacking Georgia Railroad's policies. Several days later, on May 19, mobs in Dearing and Thomson, both near Augusta, stopped Georgia Railroad trains and attacked the black firemen on board. The following days saw mob activity in other places through the state, including in Covington and Lithonia. Georgia Railroad asked Governor M. Hoke Smith for militia protection, but Smith, who sympathized with the strikers, refused. Smith also feared that his political opponent Thomas E. Watson would exploit any perceived intervention on the behalf of African Americans.

With the governor unwilling to help, Georgia Railroad sent telegrams to Federal officials Charles P. Neill and Martin Augustine Knapp asking them to serve as mediators under the terms of the Erdman Act, which had been passed several years earlier as a response to the Pullman Strike, another railroad strike. However, following the mob activity, on May 22 the governor sent John C. Hart, the Attorney General of Georgia to meet with railroad officials and review the situation. Hart recommended that both sides seek arbitration, though initially there were disagreements between the railroad and union on how this should be done. The Georgia Railroad turned down the offer to have the arbitration be done locally, most likely due to mistrust of Governor Smith, and the union rejected the proposal from Neill and Knapp to have Federal arbitration, calling the dispute "purely local". Meanwhile, mob activity increased as trains were now being detained in Union Point and Georgia Railroad began to bring in white strikebreakers from outside the state.

On May 23, following attacks on two engineers, the engineers of the Georgia Railroad left their post. The following day, Neill announced he would be coming to Atlanta to work on a settlement between the two parties, though the union was quick to dismiss this as "outside interference". According to The New York Times, which had been covering the incident, President William Howard Taft was considering the use of Federal troops to address the situation, but ultimately decided against that, as he felt it would hurt the Republican Party's image in the Southern United States. On May 27, Ball, fearful of further Federal involvement in the strike, allowed for two mail trains to run between Augusta and Atlanta daily, which started the following day. That same day, Knapp joined Neill in Atlanta. On May 29, the strike was called off as the two parties entered into discussions.

=== Mediation ===
Following Knapp's arrival, the railroad and union came to an agreement that the ten white firemen whose firings had triggered the strike would be rehired, but the railroad rejected the union's proposal to fire all African American firemen. Additionally, the railroad and the brotherhood agreed to allow a team of three mediators to resolve the remaining issues under the terms of the Erdman Act. The three men selected as arbitrators were Thomas W. Hardwick (the union's pick), Hilary A. Herbert (the railroad's pick), and University of Georgia chancellor David Crenshaw Barrow Jr. (Hardwick and Herbert's pick). On June 21, the three mediators began to hear testimony.

On June 26, the arbitrators released their decision, wherein they decided against the union on every major point. However, the arbitrators did rule that the railroad would be required to pay African American and white firemen the same wage. Hardwick had been a dissenting vote on several of the issues, and he opposed allowing the railroad to employ African Americans, but supported the requirement for equal pay. The decision, while unpopular among Ball and other union officials, was not appealed.

== Aftermath and legacy ==
In an article published concurrently to the strike, African American newspaper the Atlanta Independent, noted that the strike was "nothing less than a cowardly subterfuge ... for the purpose of oppressing black working men because they are black." Furthermore, Benjamin Davis, editor of the Independent and father of civil rights activist Benjamin J. Davis Jr., called the strike an act of "coercion and violence" against African American workers. American historian Darlene Clark Hine said the strike was the most widely covered labor and race-related incident prior to the East St. Louis riots of 1917.

The arbitration's decisions were popularly received by many in the African American community, especially the ruling of equal pay for both whites and African Americans. While there were initially concerns that this ruling would result in whites being selected over African Americans, railroads retained African American firemen at pre-strike levels. Many saw the decision as a vindication of Booker T. Washington's ideas of racial progress through economic development. Washington personally thanked Herbert for the decision, which he said would have a far-reaching positive impact on the African American community. However, Hubert Harrison would cite the strike in his arguments against Booker T. Washington. According to Harvey, the strike highlighted the issue of industrial training for African Americans in the absence of political rights, as, according to Harrison, "any training which makes black men more efficient will bring them into keener competition with white men. ... Their jobs will be taken away."

== Bibliography ==
- Dittmer, John (1980). Black Georgia in the Progressive Era, 1900-1920 (Illini books ed.). University of Illinois Press. ISBN 978-0-252-00813-9 – via Google Books.
- Jenkins, Earnestine; Hine, Darlene Clark, eds. (2001). A Question of Manhood: The 19th Century: From Emancipation to Jim Crow. Vol. 2. Indiana University Press. ISBN 978-0-253-21460-7 – via Google Books.
- Marshall, F. Ray (1967). Labor in the South. Harvard University Press. ISBN 978-0-674-50700-5 – via Google Books.
- Matthews, John Michael (November 1974). "The Georgia "Race Strike" of 1909". The Journal of Southern History. 40 (4). Southern Historical Association: 613–630. doi:10.2307/2206357. ISSN 0022-4642. JSTOR 2206357.
- Moreno, Paul D. (2006). Black Americans and Organized Labor: A New History. Louisiana State University Press. ISBN 978-0-8071-3425-2 – via Google Books.
- Perry, Jeffrey B. (2009). Hubert Harrison: The Voice of Harlem Radicalism, 1883-1918. Columbia University Press. ISBN 978-0-231-51122-3 – via Google Books.
- Reich, Steven A. (2013). A Working People: A History of African American Workers Since Emancipation. Rowman & Littlefield. ISBN 978-1-4422-0333-4 – via Google Books.
