= Poynor School =

- Poynor Junior High School
- U.S. National Register of Historic Places
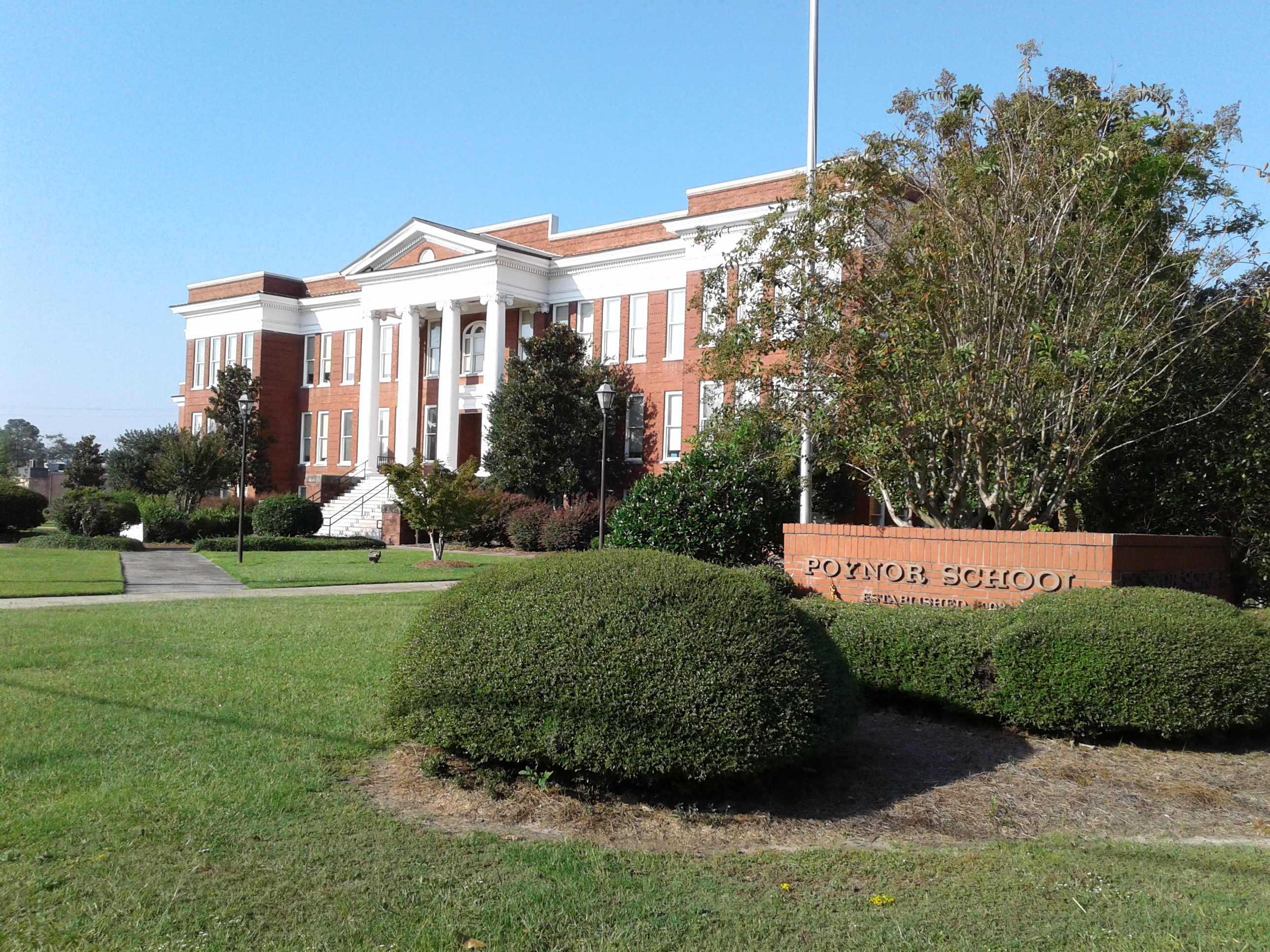

- Location within South Carolina Location within the United States
- Location: 301 S. Dargan St., Florence, South Carolina
- Coordinates: 34°11′36″N 79°45′56″W
- Area: 4.5 acres (1.8 ha)
- Built: 1908
- Built by: J.F. Ong
- Architect: William J. Wilkins
- Architectural style: Colonial Revival
- NRHP reference No.: 83002194
- Added to NRHP: May 19, 1983

Poynor School is a historic school building constructed from 1906 to 1908 in Florence, South Carolina. It was designed by local architect William J. Wilkins and was the contractor's first commission as an architect. Now known as Poynor Junior High School, it is located at 301 South Dargan Street and is listed on the National Register of Historic Places (May 19, 1983).

The three-story brick building is in a Neoclassical Georgian Revival style. Construction was carried out by J.F. Ong of Columbia, South Carolina according to plans by W.J. Wilkins who revised the original plans by Charles Coker Wilson. The building includes features a central tetrastyle colossal Ionic portico with six bays on either side of the portico and four-bay pavilions at each end of the main block. A banquet for President William Howard Taft was held at the school in 1910. The building and grounds have also been used for recitals, concerts, meetings, lectures, tournaments, fundraisers, and extracurricular classes.
