= Georgia Cannonball =

Passenger train in Georgia

Overview
- Service type: Inter-city rail
- Status: Discontinued
- Locale: Georgia, US
- First service: 1845
- Last service: May 6, 1983
- Former operator: Georgia Railroad

Route
- Termini: Atlanta Union Station (1930) (until c. 1971), Atlanta - Hunter Street (1971 -1983); Augusta Union Station (until c. 1968), Augusta - Harrisonville Yard (1968 - 1983)
- Average journey time: variable
- Service frequency: Daily
- Train number: 1, 2

On-board services
- Seating arrangements: Caboose (1969–1983)

The Georgia Cannonball was the given name of an intercity passenger train operated by the Georgia Railroad. It was a local service which ran on the railroad's main line between Atlanta and Augusta, Georgia. The railroad was completed between the two cities in 1845. A round trip was dropped in 1968, leaving a single daily round trip on the route. The service became a mixed train on July 1, 1969. Georgia Railroad declined to join Amtrak in 1971, leaving the service as one of the few intercity rail routes in America which was not operated by the new quasi-government agency. By the 1980s, it was reduced to a bare bones mixed train service. The final passenger run occurred on May 6, 1983; by then a normal trip between endpoints could take up to 12 hours.
