= William J. Wilkins (architect) =

American architect

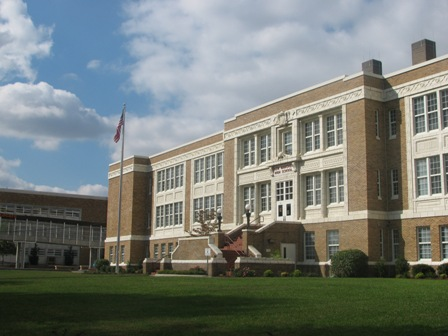
New Hanover High School

William J. Wilkins was an American architect in Florence, South Carolina and in partnership with Joseph F. Leitner in Wilmington, North Carolina.

Wilkins began his architectural career as a contractor and builder. He was inspector of buildings in Florence in 1900 and was the contractor for several major buildings in the area and in the Pee Dee region including:

- Florence City Hall and Opera House (1900) on Evans Street
- Darlington City Hall and Opera House (1904), designed by Frank P. Milburn
- Building contractor Murchison School in Bennettsville (1902), designed by Denver architect John J. Huddart.

Wilkins had his first building commission as an architect with the Poynor School in Florence (1904–06). The school was listed in the National Register of Historic Places 19 May 1983.

Wilkins designed a small rail depot in Chadbourn, North Carolina in 1904 before entering into a partnership with Leitner, practicing as Leitner & Wilkins, first in Florence and then out of the Southern Building in Wilmington, North Carolina. The firm's projects included the Atlantic Coast Line Depot (Florence, South Carolina) and Goldsboro Union Station, both commissioned in 1907.

Wilkins partnered with Leslie Norwood Boney, Sr. from 1919 to 1920. During this association Boney supervised construction of the New Hanover County High School. Boney named his second son William J. The Florence County Library was designed by the firm.

Wilkins worked on several for schools including one in Cheraw (1914 and 1923), Lake City (1923), and Marion (1923); and for the Park School (1915), the "Colored" School (1916), and Florence High School (1919–1920).

Frank V. Hopkins joined Wilkins in 1924, forming Wilkins and Hopkins. They worked together until Wilkins died in 1932. Their work included schools in Hartsville (1925), Florence (1927), Myrtle Beach (1927), Conway (1928), and Cheraw (1928). The Florence Masonic Temple (1932) was one of the firm's last designs.

Wilkins is credited as the architect on National Register of Historic Places buildings:

- Marion High School, 719 N. Main St. Marion, SC (Wilkins, W.J. & Co.)
- Poynor Junior High School, 301 S. Dargan St. Florence, SC (Wilkins, W.J.)
