= William Hooper School =

Historic school building in North Carolina, United States

- William Hooper School (Former)
- U.S. National Register of Historic Places
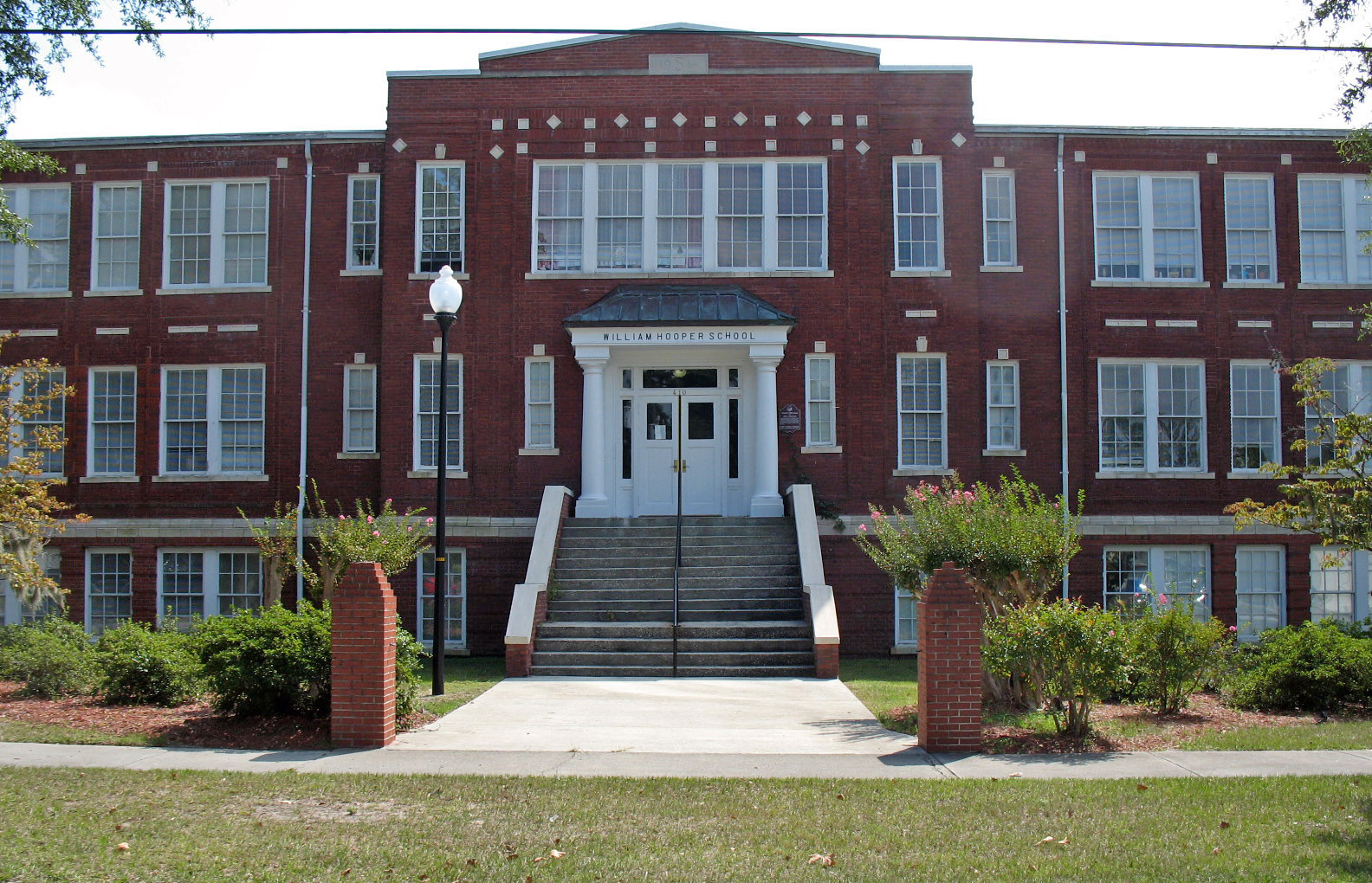
- William Hooper School in 2009

- Location within North Carolina Location within the United States
- Location: 410 Meares Street; Wilmington, North Carolina
- Coordinates: 34°13′17″N 77°56′34″W
- Area: 1 acre (0.40 ha)
- Built: 1914
- Built by: Wallace & Osterman
- Architect: Joseph F. Leitner
- Architectural style: Classical Revival
- NRHP reference No.: 98000231
- Added to NRHP: March 12, 1998

William Hooper School is a historic school building located on Mears Street between South 4th and South 5th Streets in Wilmington, New Hanover County, North Carolina. It was designed by Joseph F. Leitner's firm and is described as being in a Classical Revival style. It was built by Wallace & Osterman in 1914. Eliza Meares (1864–1926) was the school's first principal, serving from 1914 to 1925. The school closed in 1984 and in 1998 the building was converted to apartments for the elderly. It is named for William Hooper (1742–1790) of Boston, Massachusetts, who was a representative of North Carolina and signed the Declaration of Independence.

It was listed on the National Register of Historic Places in 1998.
