= Columbus County Courthouse =

Historic courthouse in North Carolina, US

- U.S. National Register of Historic Places
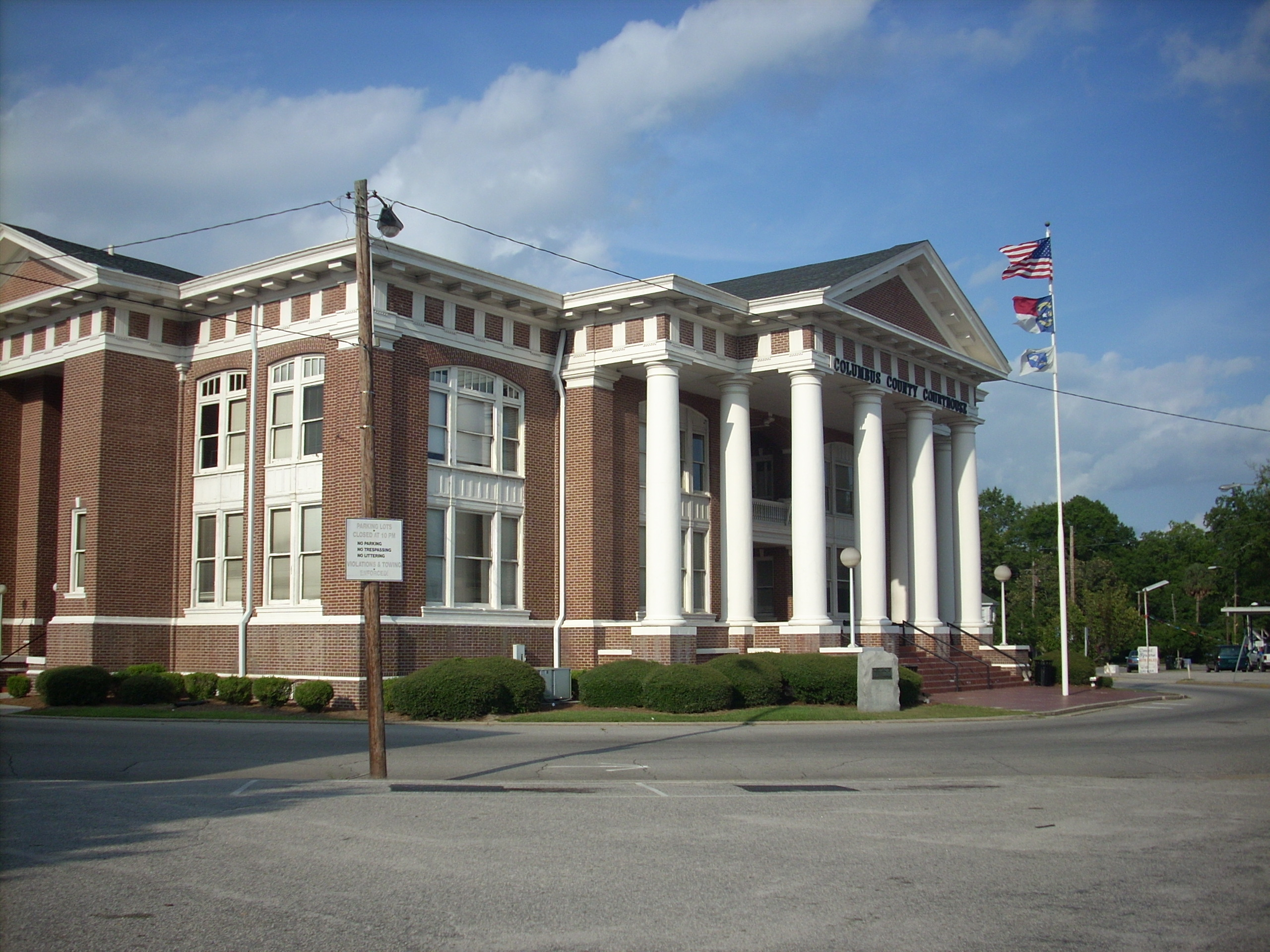
- Columbus County Courthouse, August 2010

- Location within North Carolina Location within the United States
- Location: Bounded by Madison and Jefferson Sts. circle Whiteville, North Carolina
- Coordinates: 34°20′16″N 78°42′17″W
- Area: less than one acre
- Built: 1914-1915
- Architect: Leitner, Joseph F.
- Architectural style: Classical Revival
- MPS: North Carolina County Courthouses TR
- NRHP reference No.: 79001695
- Added to NRHP: May 10, 1979

The Columbus County Courthouse is a historic courthouse building located in Whiteville, Columbus County, North Carolina. The two-story Classical Revival style building was designed by Joseph F. Leitner's firm, and built in 1914–1915. It is a rectangular brick and concrete building and features a pedimented, tetrastyle Doric order portico.

It was listed on the National Register of Historic Places in 1979.
