= Palmetto (ACL train) =

New York–Georgia night train, 1944 to 1967

Overview
- Service type: Inter-city rail
- Status: Discontinued
- Locale: Northeastern United States, Mid-Atlantic (United States) & Southeast United States
- Predecessor: Palmetto Limited
- First service: 1944
- Last service: 1968
- Successor: Palmetto (Amtrak train)
- Former operator(s): Pennsylvania Railroad; Richmond, Fredericksburg and Potomac Railroad; Atlantic Coast Line Railroad; Seaboard Coast Line (1967–1968)

Route
- Termini: New York City; Augusta, Georgia and Savannah, Georgia; additional section to Wilmington, North Carolina
- Distance travelled: 805 miles (1,296 km) (New York - Augusta)
- Service frequency: Daily
- Train number(s): Southbound: 77; Northbound: 78

On-board services
- Seating arrangements: Reclining seat coaches (1955)
- Sleeping arrangements: Roomettes, double bedrooms and drawing rooms; Open sections, compartments & drawing room (Washington–Savannah) (1955)
- Catering facilities: Cafe car: New York–Washington; dining car: Washington–Savannah; cafe-lounge: Florence–Augusta & Rocky Mount–Wilmington (1955)

Technical
- Track gauge: 4 ft 8 1/2 in (1,435 mm)

The Palmetto was a night train between New York, New York and two different Georgia destinations, Augusta and Savannah. It was operated by the Atlantic Coast Line Railroad, with the cooperation of the Richmond, Fredericksburg and Potomac Railroad and the Pennsylvania Railroad. During its final year it was operated by the Seaboard Coast Line Railroad (the post-merger successor of the Atlantic Coast Line Railroad).

== Train origins ==
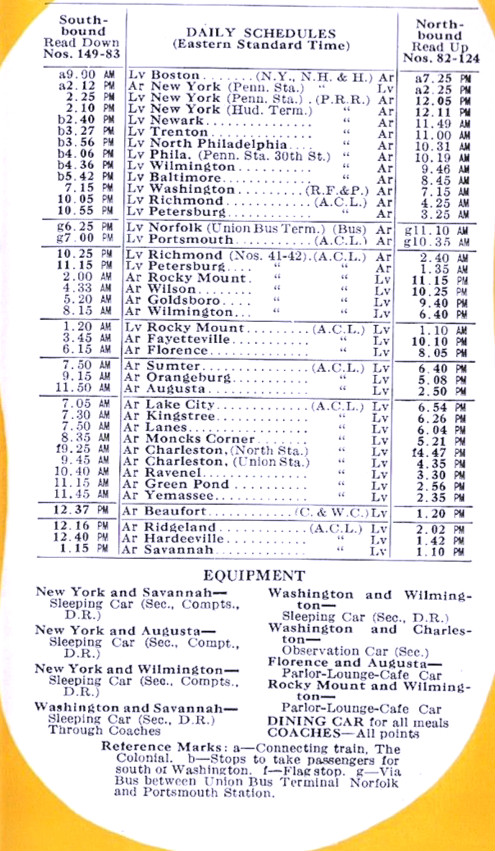
The 1939 timetable for the predecessor Palmetto Limited.

The train began in 1944. It had its origins in the ACL's Palmetto Limited (initiated in 1910). In addition to its main terminal points in Augusta and Savannah, the Palmetto had a branch that went to Wilmington, North Carolina's Union Station. At Augusta Union Station the train had a connection to Georgia Railroad's train from Augusta to Atlanta's Union Station.

== Decline ==
In the 1960s the ACL and SCL cut some of the Palmetto's services. By 1963 the ACL trimmed its south of Richmond meal services to a cafe-lounge between Florence and Augusta, leaving the Savannah and Wilmington branches without food catering. By 1965, the Savannah branch was dropped and Wilmington-bound riders had to change to another train at Rocky Mount. Between December 1967 and 1968, the train was dropped from the SCL's timetables. Its Wilmington branch was the last train to serve Wilmington and its Union Station.

In 1976, Amtrak resurrected the name for a New York–Florida train; that train's route was shortened to end at Savannah in 2004.
