= Union Station (Wilmington, North Carolina) =

Coordinates: 34.2413°N 77.9490°W

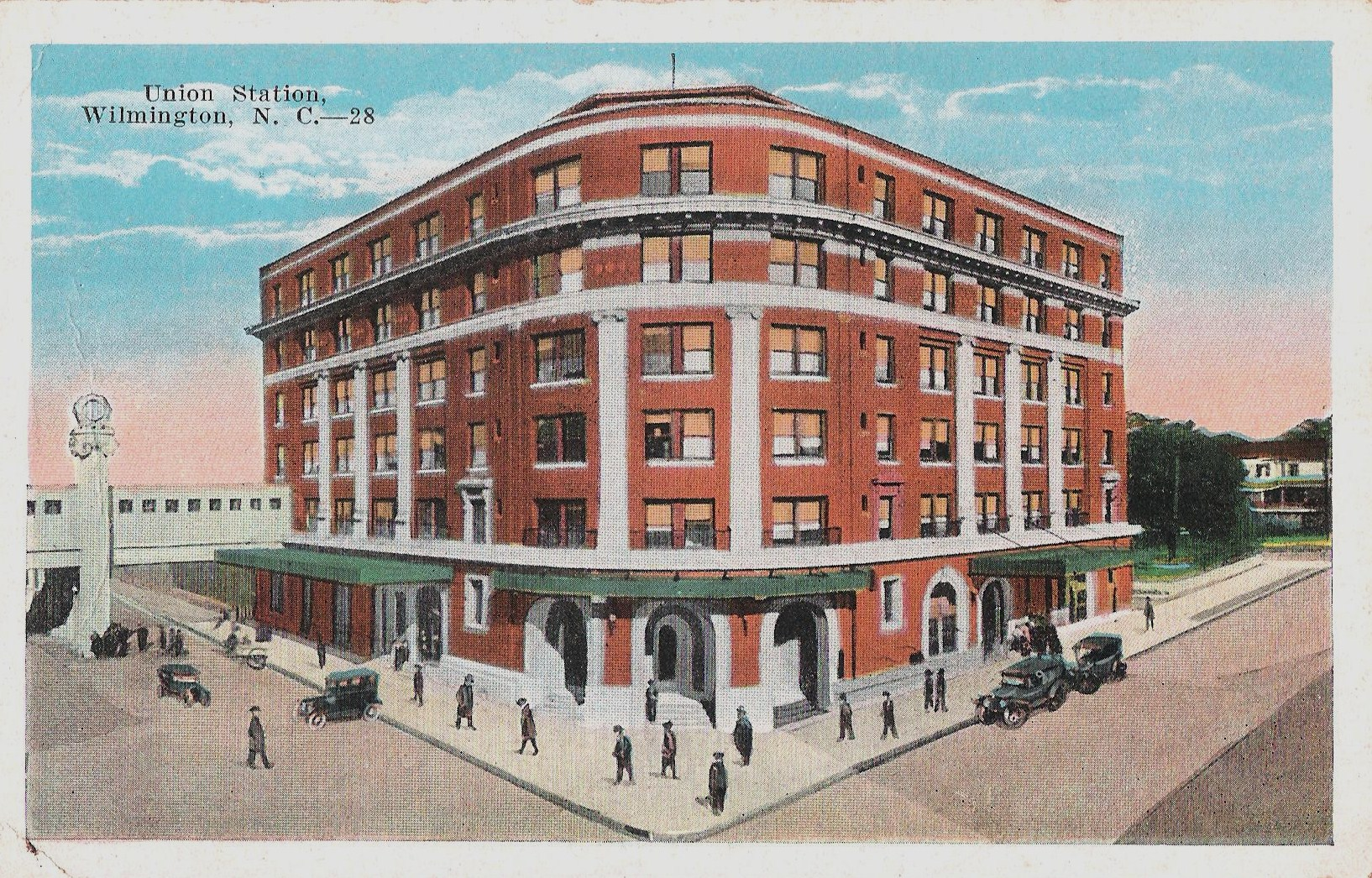
Union Station c. 1917

Wilmington Union Station was a union station in Wilmington, North Carolina. Opened in 1913, it was designed by architect Joseph F. Leitner. Construction by Boyle-Robertson contractors began in 1912. It was located at Front Street and Red Cross Street in downtown Wilmington.

== Early years ==
In early years the station had tenants in both of the railroads serving the city: Atlantic Coast Line Railroad and Seaboard Air Line Railroad. However, by 1932, the Seaboard Air Line Line relocated to its own Wilmington facility 3.1 miles away.

The Atlantic Coast Line's history with the city dated back to 1840 when the predecessor railroad, Wilmington and Raleigh Railroad opened a 161 mile route to Weldon, North Carolina to the northwest. The ACL set its headquarters in buildings adjacent to Union Station.

== Passenger trains ==
- The ACL's Tar Heel (New York City train, discontinued, 1937, with a Norfolk, VA-originating section) terminated at the station

successors to Tar Heel:

  - section of the Havana Special (New York - Miami) that split off at Rocky Mount station
  - section of the Palmetto (New York - Miami) that split off at Rocky Mount

The station served additional unnamed trains:

- New Bern, NC - Wilmington
- Mt. Airy, NC - Greensboro - Sanford - Fayetteville, North Carolina - Wilmington (with change of trains at Fayetteville station, a crossing point of the ACL's main line)
- Augusta - Sumter - Florence - Chadbourn - Wilmington (at Chadbourn, passengers could transfer to a Myrtle Beach-bound ACL train) (In earlier years the train originated at Columbia, South Carolina's Union Station.)

== Demise ==
In the latter 1950s, the directors of the remaining tenant, the ACL, viewed the location as remote from the main network. Furthermore, leaders were seeking a merger with the Florida East Coast Railway, the ACL's route to Miami and the rest of southeast Florida. The merger would need the assent of Florida's utility commission, so the company had another incentive to move to Florida.

The ACL was one of the largest employers in Wilmington. It had a 1,650 employee payroll in the city; and over 1,300 employees in the main office would be affected by a move from the station and the company headquarters. The company's move and the departure of employees that would follow the company to Florida would affect the city's tax base, in the company's estimation. Nevertheless, the ACL left Wilmington in 1960, to relocate its headquarters to Jacksonville, Florida.

The ACL merged with the SAL in 1967 to form the Seaboard Coast Line Railroad; and in 1968 the last train, the Palmetto, left the station.

The station was demolished in 1970 and its location now is the site of much of Cape Fear Community College's campus.

The North Carolina Department of Transportation as of 2007 was studying the resumption of intercity passenger train service from Raleigh through Goldsboro to Wilmington.

| Preceding station | Atlantic Coast Line Railroad | Following station |
|---|---|---|
| Yadkin Junction toward Mount Airy | Sanford Branch | Terminus |
| Yadkin Junction toward Columbia | Columbia – Wilmington | Terminus |
| New Bern Junction toward Wilson | Wilson – Wilmington | Terminus |
| Preceding station | Seaboard Air Line Railroad | Following station |
| Hilton toward Rutherfordton | Carolina Central Railroad before 1932 | Terminus |
