= Conway Methodist Church =

Historic church in South Carolina, United States

- Conway Methodist Church, 1898 and 1910 Sanctuaries
- U.S. National Register of Historic Places
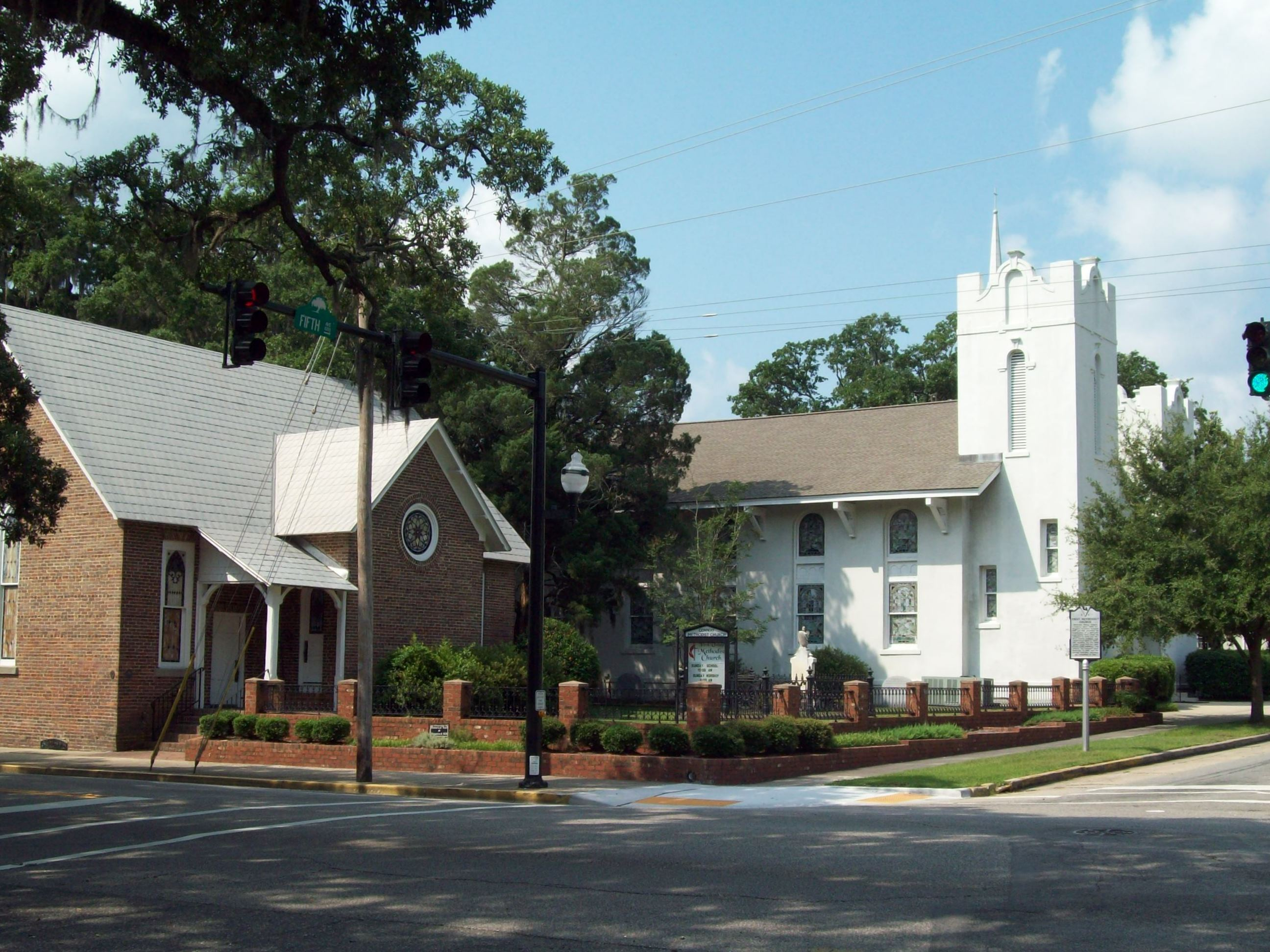
- Conway Methodist Church, 1898 and 1910 Sanctuaries, June 2010

- Location within South Carolina Location within the United States
- Location: Fifth Ave., Conway, South Carolina
- Coordinates: 33°50′12″N 79°2′53″W
- Area: 0.5 acres (0.20 ha)
- Built: 1898
- Architect: Leitner, Joseph; et al.
- Architectural style: Late Gothic Revival, Mission/Spanish Revival
- MPS: Conway MRA
- NRHP reference No.: 86002225
- Added to NRHP: August 5, 1986

Conway Methodist Church, 1898 and 1910 Sanctuaries, also known as First United Methodist Church, is a historic Methodist church located at Conway in Horry County, South Carolina. The 1898 sanctuary is a one-story, brick, cruciform, cross-gable roofed, Gothic Revival style building. It features Tudor arched stained glass lancet windows. The 1910 sanctuary is a Mission Revival style building and is a large one-story, front-gabled roof, stuccoed building. It features two square bell towers.

It was listed on the National Register of Historic Places in 1986.

== Gallery ==
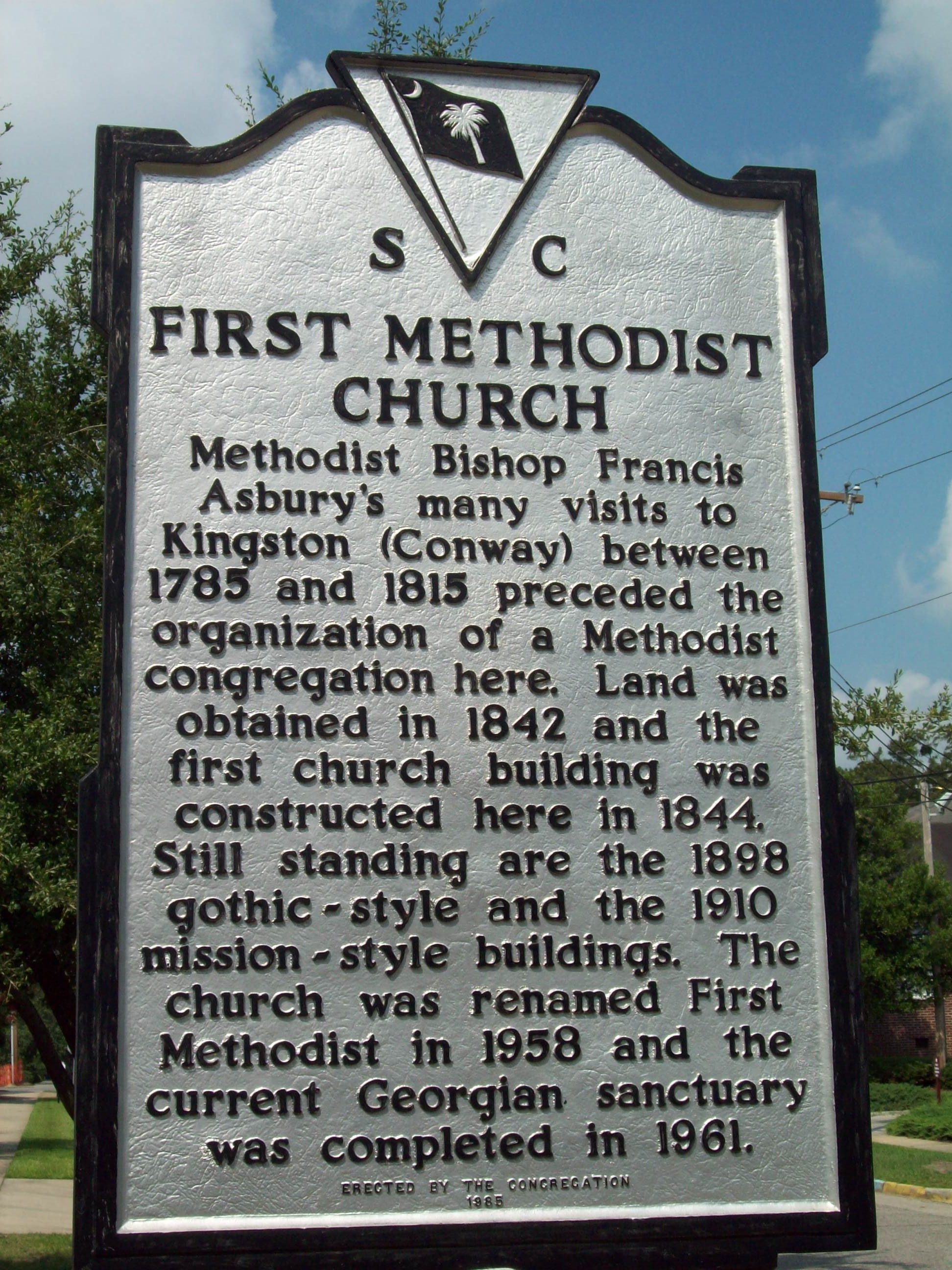
Historic marker

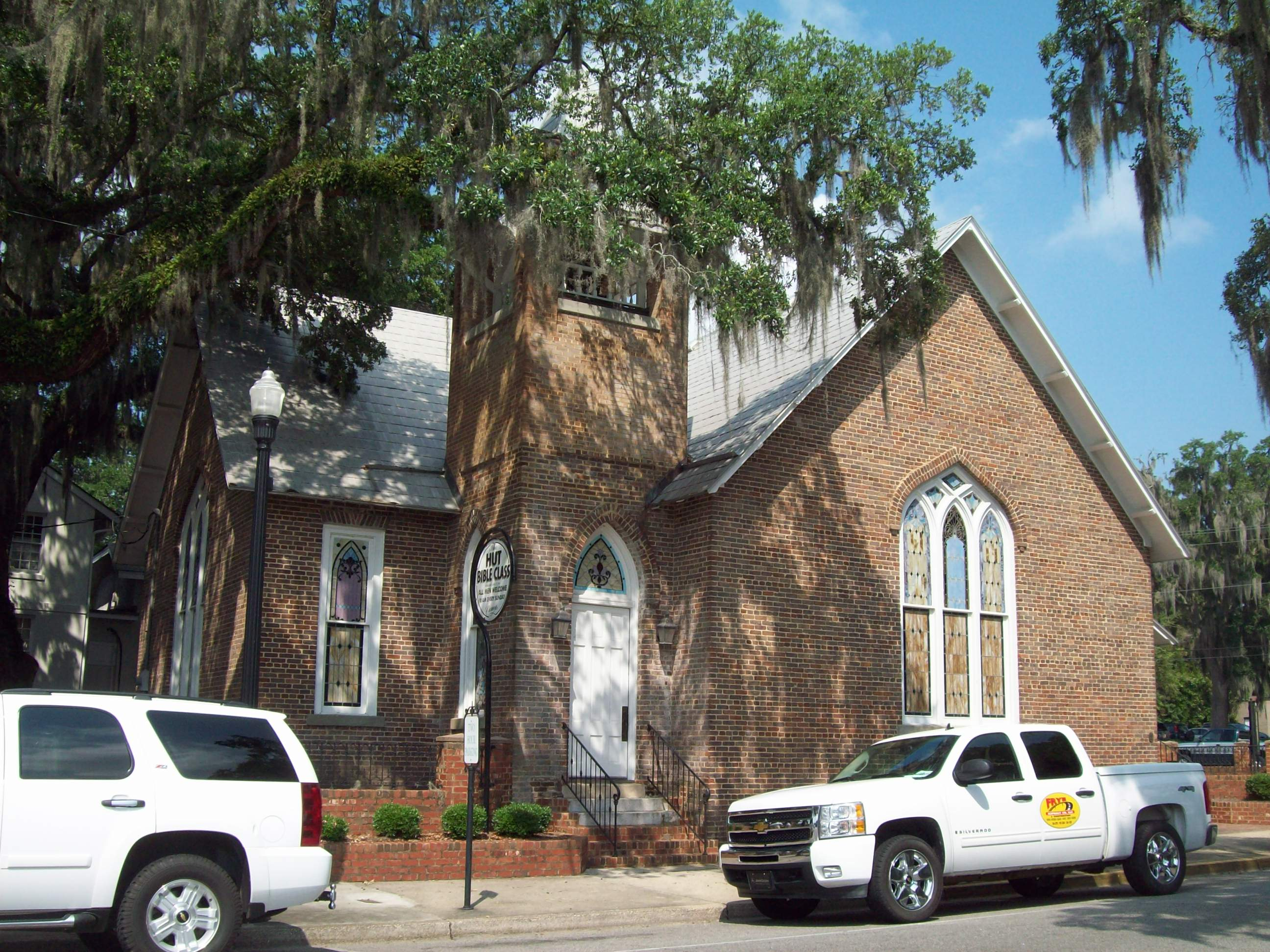
1898 Sanctuary

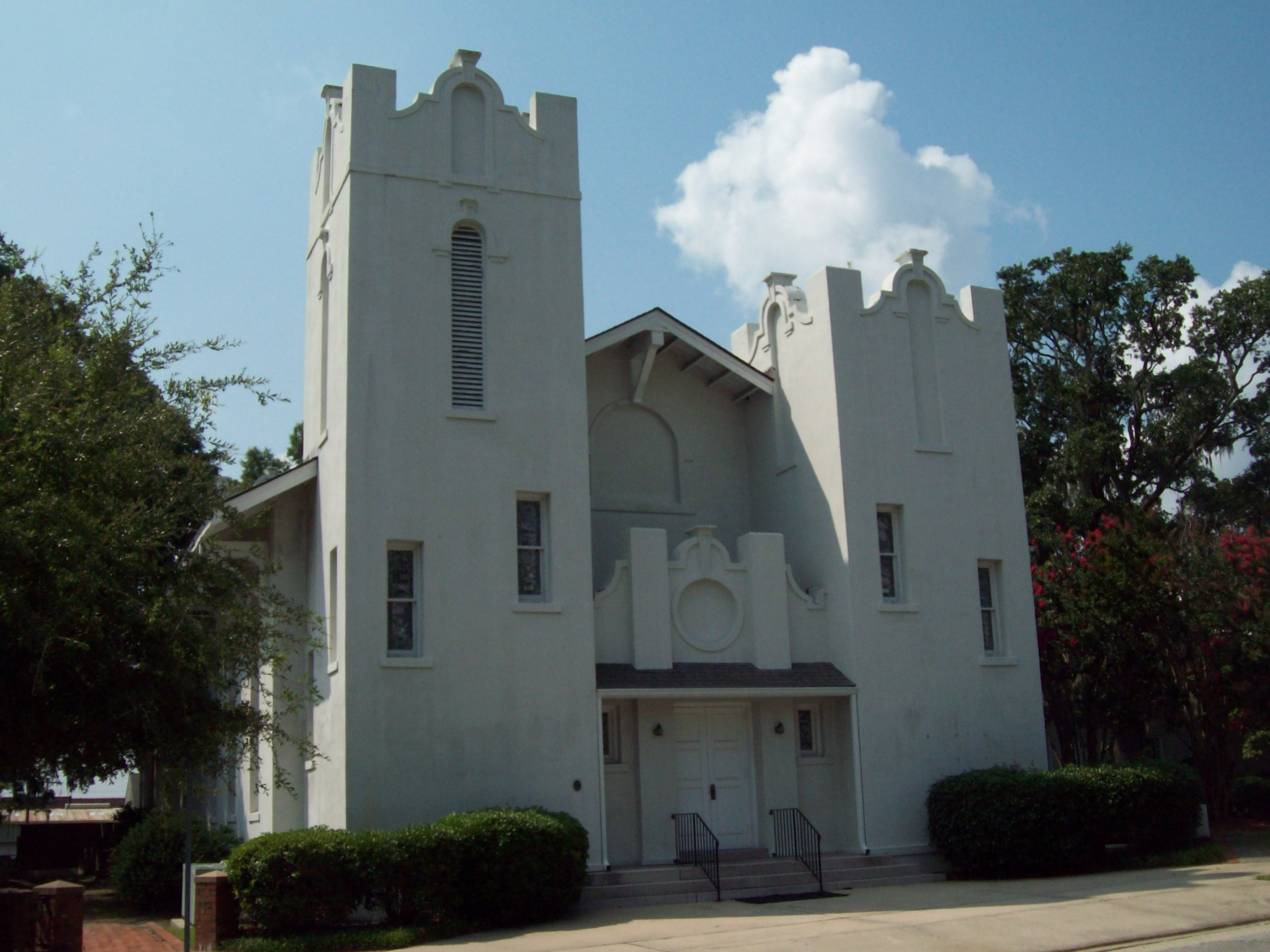
1910 Sanctuary
