= Augusta Union Station =

Former train station in Augusta, Georgia, U.S.

Coordinates: 33.4715°N 81.9685°W

General information
- Lines: Atlantic Coast Line Railroad, Georgia Railroad, Southern Railway, Central of Georgia Railway, Charleston & Western Carolina Railway, Georgia & Florida Railroad

Construction
- Architectural style: Spanish Renaissance

History
- Opened: 1903
- Closed: 1968

Key dates
- 1974: demolished

Former services
Preceding station	Atlantic Coast Line Railroad	Following station
Terminus	Augusta – Florence	North Augusta toward Florence
Preceding station	Central of Georgia Railway	Following station
Terminus	Augusta – Millen	Allens toward Millen
Preceding station	Georgia Railroad	Following station
Harrisonville toward Atlanta	Main Line	Terminus
Preceding station	Southern Railway	Following station
Terminus	Augusta – Charleston	Hamburg toward Charleston
Terminus	Augusta – Columbia	Hamburg toward Columbia
Galvans toward Tennille	Augusta Southern Railroad	Terminus
Location

Augusta Union Station was a train depot in Augusta, Georgia at 525 8th Street, serving trains from its opening in 1903 to its closing in 1968. The Spanish Renaissance styled building was in central Augusta at Barrett Square, five blocks from the banks of the Savannah River.

== History ==
The station served trains of the Atlantic Coast Line Railroad (ACL), Georgia Railroad, Southern Railway, Central of Georgia Railway, Charleston & Western Carolina Railway, and Georgia & Florida Railroad.

Noteworthy was the Southern Railway's Augusta Special, which in peak years went as far as New York City and in later years went as far as Charlotte, North Carolina, via Columbia, South Carolina.

Additionally, the Atlantic Coast Line's Palmetto operated from New York to Augusta, with a connecting train over Georgia Railroad tracks from Augusta to Atlanta. The ACL offered service on its train #50 bound for Washington, D.C., and New York City. (For the return trip, passengers would take the ACL's West Coast Champion, which would have a special Augusta-bound section breaking off at Florence, South Carolina).

The Georgia Railroad offered connecting trains such as the Georgia Cannonball, to Atlanta Union Station. In the same fashion, the ACL and the Georgia Railroad offered overnight Atlanta–Augusta–Wilmington, North Carolina service; until the early 1950s the train had an additional branch that veered southeast to Charleston, South Carolina. With the ACL's merger with the Seaboard Air Line Railroad (SAL) into the Seaboard Coast Line Railroad in 1967 the Palmetto picked up this service but shortened the route to Augusta. However, the SCL continued to operate a connecting Augusta to Atlanta train.

The Charleston & Western Railway operated passenger train service between Augusta and Port Royal, South Carolina, on the Atlantic Coast with a major transfer stop at Yemassee, South Carolina, until some point between 1954 and 1955.

Service declined in destinations by the late 1960s. In 1968 the station was closed. Nonetheless, the SCL continued Florence to Augusta train service, last as a section of the New York - Florida train, the Champion; this ended in 1970. The station was demolished four years later; in its place is a post office.
