= Georgia Railroad and Banking Company =

Historic American railroad and banking company

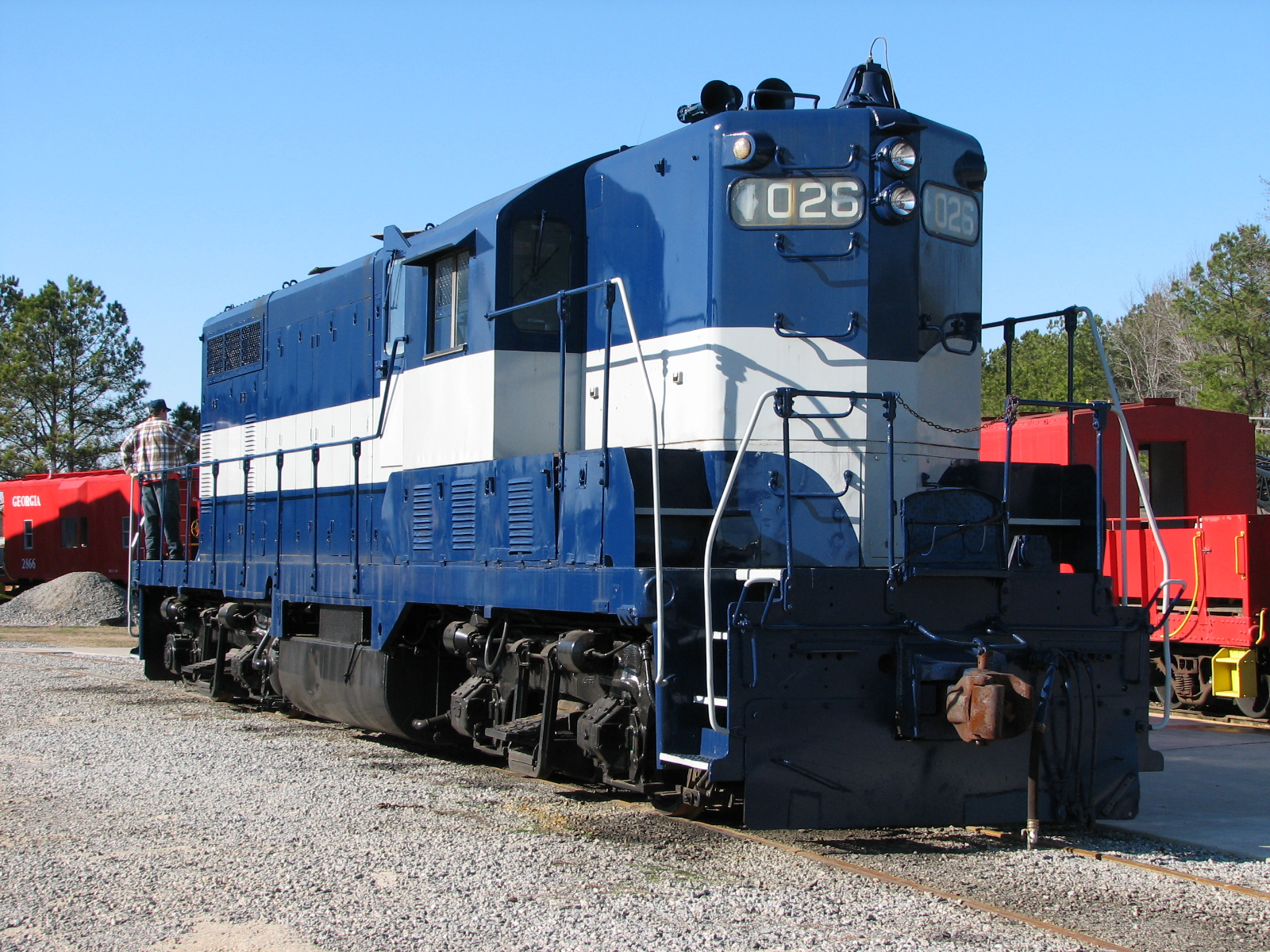
- Georgia Railroad 1026, an EMD GP7—on permanent display in Duluth, Georgia.

Overview
- Operator: Jointly leased to the Central Rail Road and Banking Company of Georgia (1881-1896) and the Louisville and Nashville Railroad (1881-1902)
- Parent company: Atlantic Coast Line Railroad (1902-1967); Seaboard Coast Line Railroad (1967-1982 (Note: part of CSX Corporation from 1980))
- Reporting mark: GA
- Locale: Georgia
- Dates of operation: 1845 (Note: chartered in 1835)–1982 (Note: Railroad properties merged into the Seaboard System in 1982; banking operations merged into First Union in 1986)
- Successor: Seaboard System Railroad (1982-1986); CSX Transportation (1986-present)

Technical
- Track gauge: 4 ft 8 1/2 in (1,435 mm) standard gauge
- Previous gauge: 5 ft (1,524 mm) and converted to 4 ft 9 in (1,448 mm) in 1886
- Length: 331 mi (533 km)

The Georgia Railroad and Banking Company (reporting mark GA) also seen as "GARR", was a historic railroad and banking company that operated in the U.S. state of Georgia. In 1967 it reported 833 million revenue-ton-miles of freight and 3 million passenger-miles; at the end of the year it operated 331 miles (533 km) of road and 510 miles (820 km) of track.

== History ==
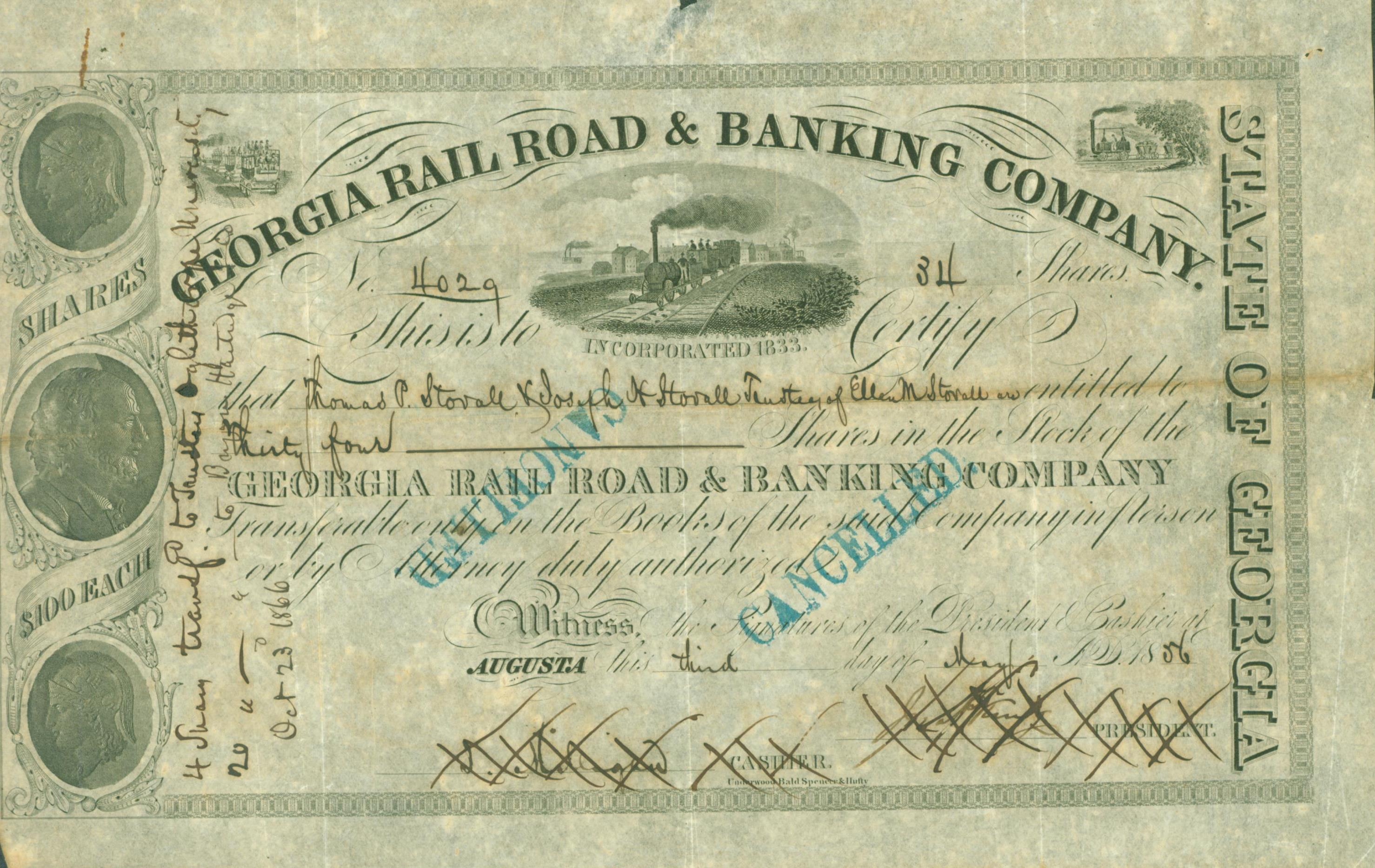
Share of the Georgia Rail Road & Banking Company, issued 3 March 1856

The company was chartered in 1833 in Augusta, Georgia. In 1835, the charter was amended to include banking. Originally the line was chartered to build a railroad from Augusta to Athens, with a branch to Madison. It was converted to 4 ft 8 1/2 in (1,435 mm) in 1886.

The 5 ft (1,524 mm) gauge railroad opened in 1845 with J. Edgar Thomson as its Chief Engineer and Richard Peters as its first Superintendent.

At that time the rates were as follows:

- 5¢ per mile for passengers
- 50¢ per 100 miles (160 km) for freight

Several other railroads were then under construction:

- The Western and Atlantic Railroad was chartered to build a line from 7 miles (11 km) south of the Chattahoochee River, at a point named Terminus (present-day Atlanta), to Chattanooga, Tennessee (formerly Ross Landing).
- The South Carolina Railroad was building a line from Charleston to North Augusta, South Carolina (formerly Hamburg).
- The Memphis and Charleston Railroad was being built from Memphis to Chattanooga.
- The Nashville and Chattanooga Railroad and the Louisville and Nashville Railroad (L&N) were both constructing rival lines between Louisville, Kentucky, and Nashville, Tennessee.

The Georgia Railroad decided to extend the Madison branch to Terminus (Atlanta) and thereby compete with the Central Railroad and Banking Company of Georgia (later the Central of Georgia Railroad), which together with the Macon & Western Railroad, was competing for traffic through Charleston's rival port of Savannah, Georgia. By 1850, this railroad had built 213 miles (343 km) of track and was up to 232 miles (373 km) by 1860. At the time, goods from the Mississippi and Ohio valleys had to go by riverboat to New Orleans and then via coastal steamships around the Florida Keys, to get to the big population centers in the Northeast. Shipping cross-country by rail to the ports of Charleston and Savannah made perfect economic sense.

=== Banking ===
The banking side of the business was quickly more successful than the railroad side. The Georgia Railroad & Banking Company was perhaps the strongest bank in Georgia for many years. The bankers used some of their wealth to buy controlling interests in the Atlanta & West Point Railroad (A&WP) and the Western Railway of Alabama (WofA), which provided a continuous line from Atlanta to Montgomery, Alabama, although the WofA was standard gauge, while all the other lines in the South were broad gauge.

=== Civil War ===
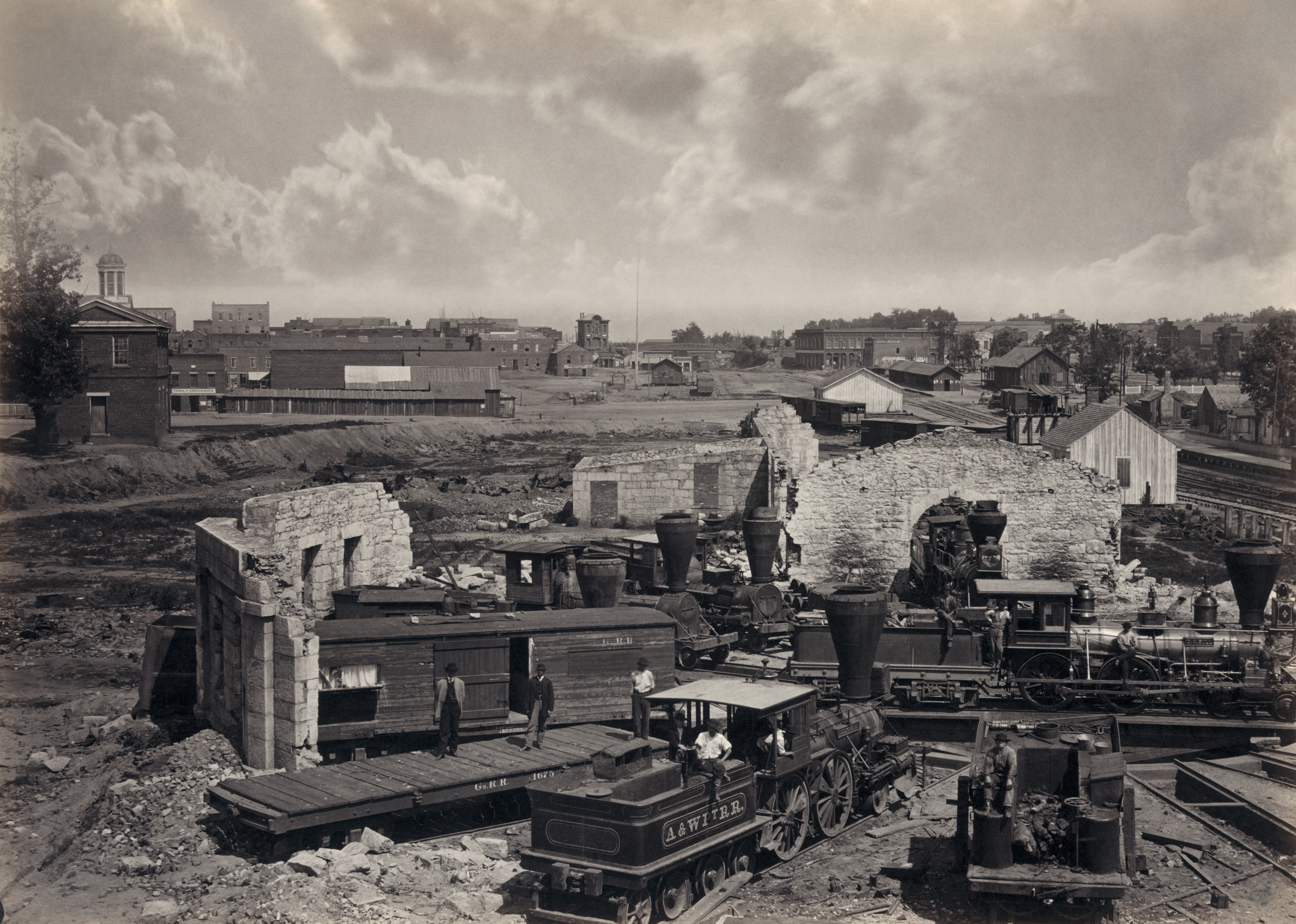
Locomotives and rolling stock of the Georgia Railroad (Ga. R. R.) and the Atlanta & West Point Railroad (A. & WPT. R. R.) in the ruined roundhouse of Atlanta, Georgia shortly after the end of the Civil War

During the American Civil War, the Confederate States of America maintained a gunpowder factory in Augusta. Carloads of gunpowder would be transported on the Georgia Railroad to various battlefields in the "Western Campaign."

Although the Civil War saw heavy damage to railroads such as the Georgia Railroad, management used their considerable resources to restore operation as quickly as possible. The Georgia Railroad even resorted to temporarily abandoning the Athens branch to secure enough rail to reopen its main line. After their defeat, returning Confederate soldiers were given free rides home, to the extent that the company's limited rail network would allow.

They also honored all Confederate scrip issued by their bank. No depositor lost their savings even if Confederate money had no value. It helped that the Georgia Railroad and Banking Company had the financial strength to honor those promises. At that time, most Southern banks were repudiating any obligations related to Confederate currency. This helped to solidify the bank's reputation as one of the premier banks in the southeastern United States, well into the 20th century.

=== Post-war years ===
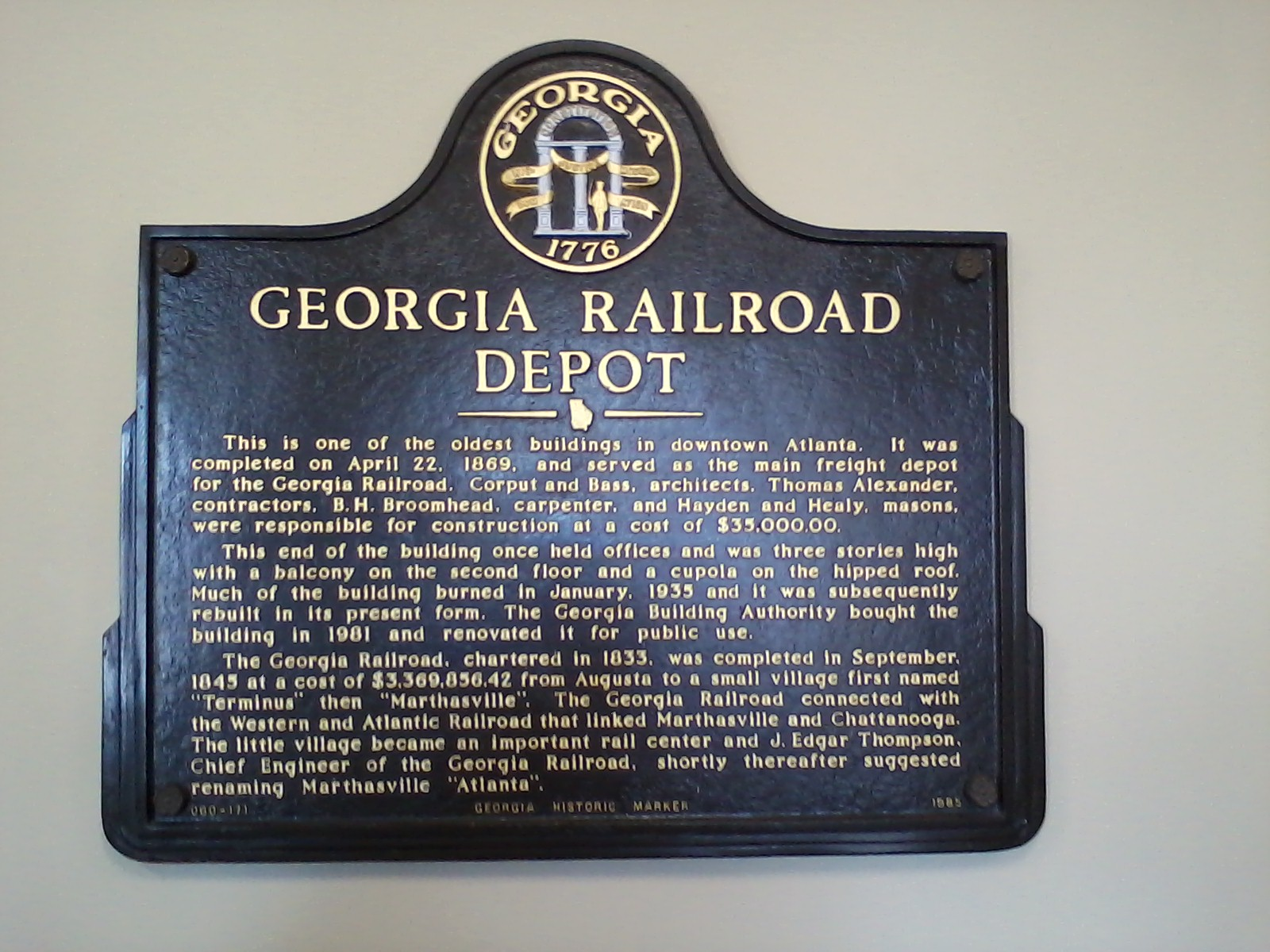
Historic marker at Georgia Railroad Freight Depot in Atlanta

The Georgia Railroad Freight Depot, designed by architect Max Corput, was completed in 1869 and is the oldest building in Downtown Atlanta. The company was later re-chartered as the Georgia Railroad Bank, then a subsidiary of the First Railroad and Banking Company, which eventually opened banks in Atlanta under the name of First Georgia Bank. The banking operations were merged with First Union in 1986 and First Union subsequently merged with Wachovia Corporation (now Wells Fargo).

The Georgia Railroad Bank entered the insurance business using subsidiaries such as First of Georgia, however these were subsequently sold, at considerable profit to the company.

In 1881, Colonel William M. Wadley, Central Railroad and Banking Company of Georgia president, leased the railroad properties of the Georgia Railroad and Banking Company, including the A&WP and WofA. Wadley assigned half of the lease to his company and half to the L&N. Following the Panic of 1896, the Central went into receivership and its portion of the lease lapsed, whereupon it was eventually reassigned to the Atlantic Coast Line Railroad (ACL). In 1902, the ACL acquired controlling interest in the L&N; thus the Georgia, A&WP, and WofA became non-operating subsidiaries of the Atlantic Coast Line. In 1909, white firemen of the Georgia Railroad, organized under the Brotherhood of Locomotive Firemen and Enginemen, went on a mass strike.

With the building of the Savannah and Atlanta Railroad, which connected with the Georgia Railroad at Warrenton, the Georgia Railroad now competed with the Central of Georgia Railroad for traffic to and from Savannah. Soon the ACL came to dominate the Augusta interchange traffic, through its Charleston and Western Carolina Railway subsidiary and via the ACL's spur from its main line at Florence, South Carolina, in order that the Georgia Railroad could compete with the Seaboard Air Line Railroad and Southern Railway for traffic from Atlanta up the Eastern seaboard.

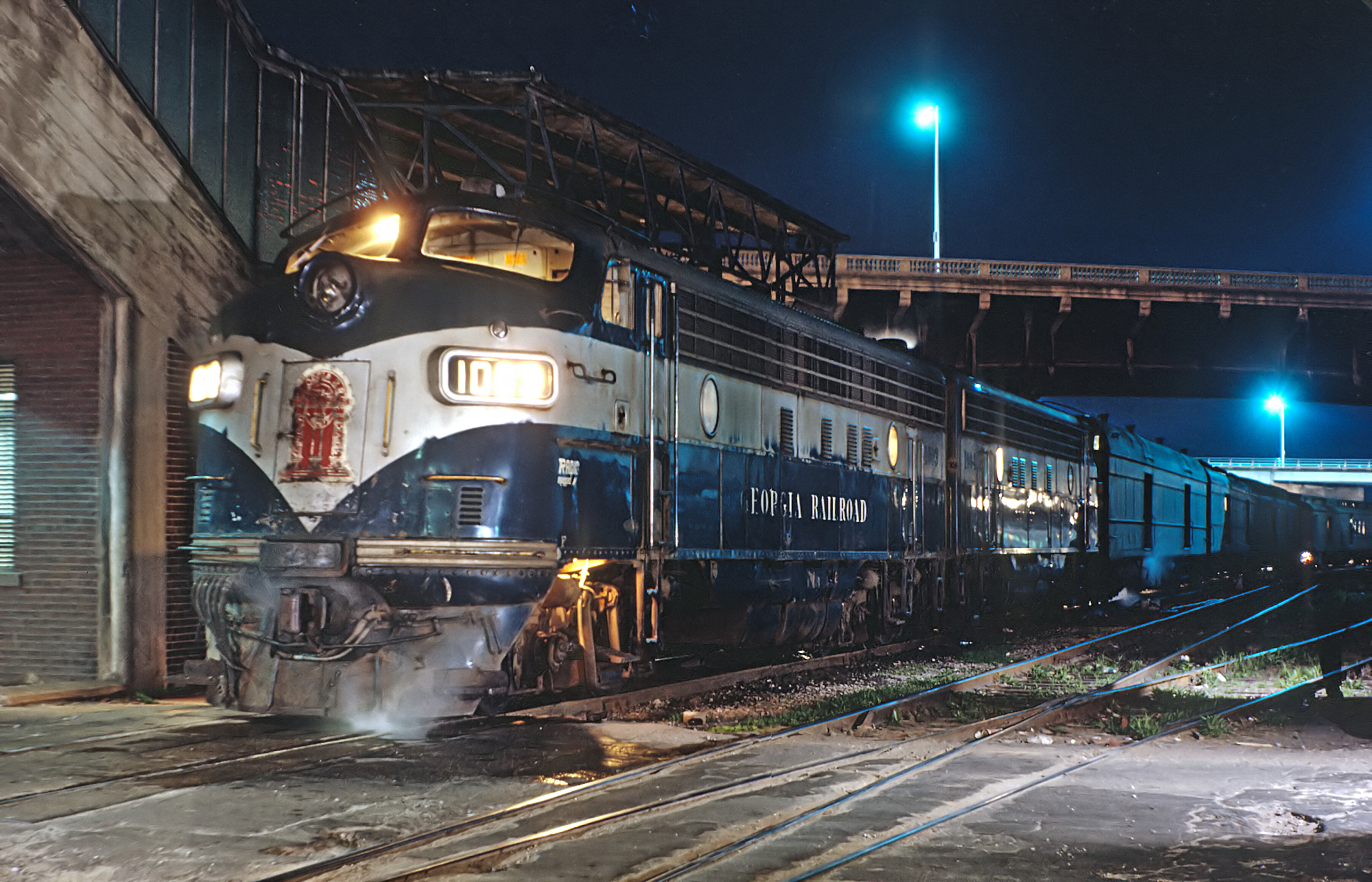
The Georgia Railroad's Augusta Local passenger train, waiting to depart from Atlanta Union Station in 1963

A 1925 timetable showed four daily roundtrips between Atlanta and Augusta. A trip on the Night Express of that era was described by W.F Beckum.

By the opening of the 1960s, however, passenger service had been reduced to an overnight through-train from Atlanta to Augusta, continuing as an Atlantic Coast Line Railroad train to Wilmington, North Carolina, and a day train from Atlanta, making connections at Augusta with an ACL train bound for Florence, South Carolina.

A unique feature of the Georgia Railroad and Banking Company charter was that the state legislature gave the corporation large tax breaks, which were legally challenged on several occasions. The charter also called for daily-except-Sunday passenger service. The lawyers advised management to maintain passenger service on all lines, so as to not violate the charter. The Georgia was among the last railroads to operate both freight and inter-city passenger trains in the "Lower 48" states, into the Amtrak era.

=== CSX ===
The Georgia Railroad originally fell under common management with the Atlanta & West Point Railroad and the Western Railway of Alabama, commonly known as "the West Point Route."

In 1967, ACL merged with the Seaboard Air Line Railroad to form the Seaboard Coast Line Railroad (SCL). SCL continued to operate the Georgia Railroad as a subsidiary alongside the Louisville & Nashville Railroad and the Clinchfield Railroad. These were known collectively as the "Family Lines System." SCL continued to operate the Georgia Railroad under its initial charter; the Georgia Railroad was maintained as a separate company, with SCL leasing the rail properties. Two years later, the Georgia Railroad ended its traditional passenger service, though it continued to operate a bare-bones mixed train service between Atlanta (Atlanta Union Station) and Augusta (Augusta Union Station).

In 1980, SCL merged with Chessie System to form CSX Corporation. In 1982, SCL and L&N merged to form the Seaboard System Railroad, beginning what would be a process in which the CSX operating companies would be merged into a single railroad. The Georgia Railroad was the first to be merged away. The railroad properties of the Georgia Railroad and Banking Company, which had been operated under a lease for 90 years by CSX and its predecessors, were formally merged into Seaboard System Railroad. The mixed train service ended in 1983.

In 1986, Seaboard System Railroad renamed itself CSX Transportation. The same year, Georgia Railroad Bank was acquired by First Union; most former branches are now part of Wells Fargo. A year later, Chessie System merged into CSX Transportation.

After a period of somewhat heavy use during the CSX ownership, most through traffic has been diverted from the former Georgia Railroad mainline. As of October 2018, only a single through train in each direction daily uses the line.

== Heritage unit ==
On June 25, 2024 CSX unveiled ES44AH No. 1834 honoring the Georgia Railroad as the 16th unit in their fleet. The unit is painted with the cab and nose in the YN3 paint of CSX with the long hood being painted in the Georgia Railroad's blue with silver stripe scheme. Before this ET44AH No. 3415 was given the Georgia Railroad's emblem on the sides of the nose.

== 1867 rail timetable ==
Distances of depots from Atlanta

#	Name	Miles	Kilometers	Notes
1	Decatur, Georgia	6	9.7
2	Stone Mountain, Georgia	16	26
3	Lithonia, Georgia	24	39
4	Conyers, Georgia	31	50
5	Covington, Georgia	41	66
6	Social Circle, Georgia	52	84
7	Rutledge, Georgia	59	95
8	Madison, Georgia	68	109
9	Buckhead, Georgia	76	122
10	Greensboro, Georgia	88	142
11	Union Point, Georgia	95	153
12	Crawfordville, Georgia	107	172
13	Barnett, Georgia	114	183	Near U.S. Highway 278 and I-20
14	Camack, Georgia	125	201	Old spelling
15	Thomson, Georgia	134	216
16	Dearing, Georgia	142	229
17	Saw Dust, Georgia	146	235	Now called Harlem
18	Berzelia, Georgia	152	245	Near Berzelia Pond
19	Belair, Georgia	162	261	Now called Grovetown
20	Augusta, Georgia	171	275

Trains departed from Atlanta at 8:55 am and 7:15 pm and arrived in Augusta at 6:00 pm and 10:05 am.

== See also ==
- Crawford Depot (Crawford, Georgia)
- Athens Line
