= Atlantic and North Carolina Railroad =

Railroad in North Carolina

Overview
- Locale: North Carolina
- Dates of operation: 1854–1989
- Successor: North Carolina Railroad Company

Technical
- Track gauge: 4 ft 8 1/2 in (1,435 mm) standard gauge
- Previous gauge: 5 ft (1,524 mm)

Atlantic and North Carolina Railroad Company was incorporated under act of the North Carolina Legislature, ratified December 27, 1852, and was organized on January 20, 1854.

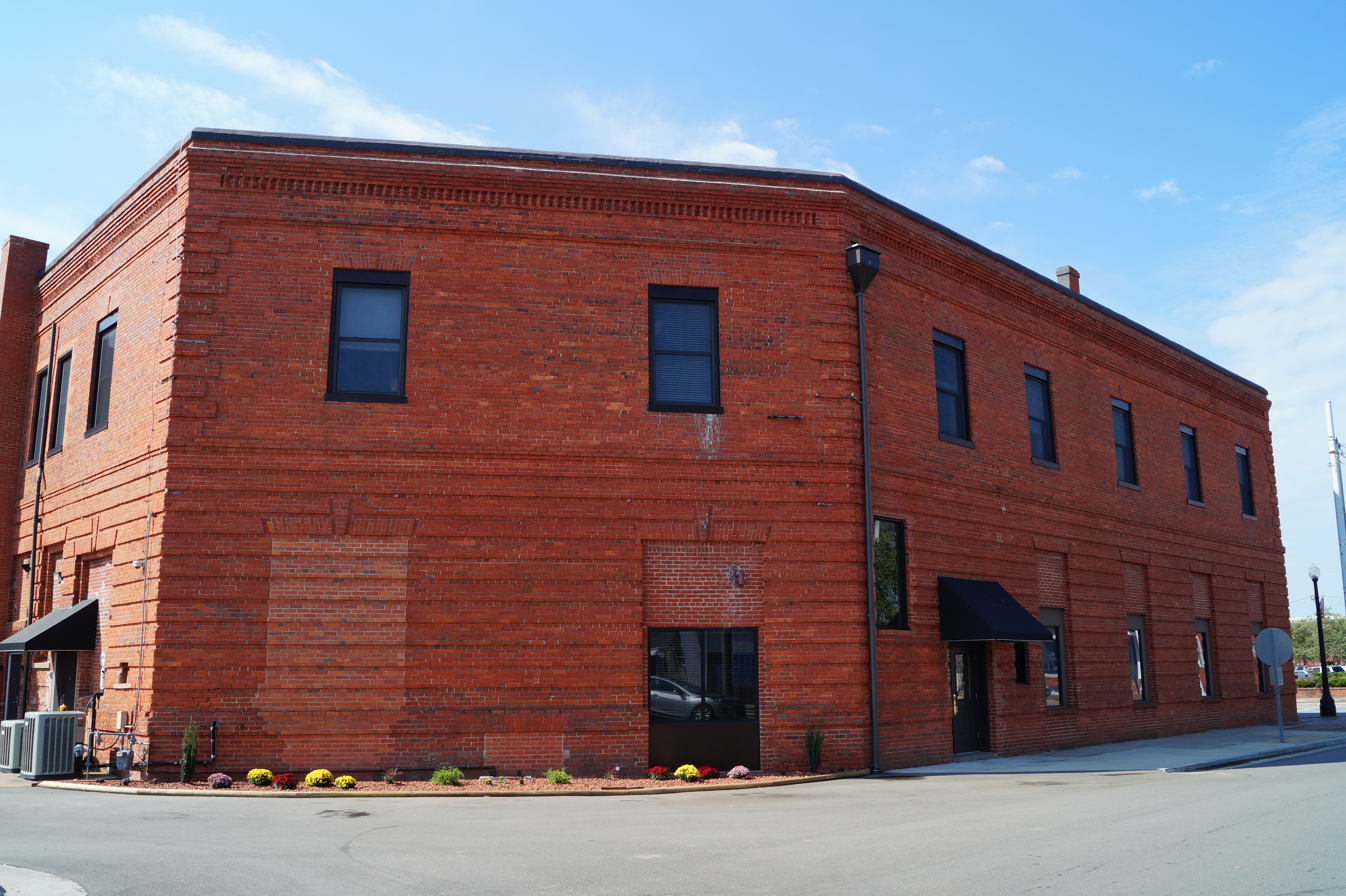
Atlantic and North Carolina Railroad Freight Depot

Atlantic and North Carolina Railroad Company constructed 96.1 miles (154.7 km) of 5 ft (1,524 mm) gauge railroad line between Morehead City, North Carolina, and Goldsboro, North Carolina, through New Bern, North Carolina. The leasehold had been acquired by Norfolk Southern Railway Company, which in turn had secured it from the Atlantic and North Carolina Company, the original lessee, when the latter was absorbed in the consolidation which formed the Norfolk Southern Railway Company.

== Early history, 1854-1900 ==
Atlantic and North Carolina Railroad Company was built by divisions, largely, if not wholly, under contract, at various times prior to the summer of 1858. Operation of the approximately 96.1 miles (154.7 km) railroad line between Morehead City, North Carolina on the Crystal Coast by the Atlantic Ocean, and Goldsboro, North Carolina, began on or about June 1, 1858.

The railroad line suffered considerable damage during the American Civil War. A First Sinking Fund Mortgage dated February 29, 1868, in the amount of $1.5 million was placed on the property in order to finance the rehabilitation of the line.

In addition to the line of railroad, the Atlantic and North Carolina company also owned the Atlantic Hotel built at Morehead City in 1880 to replace the original Atlantic Hotel which had been built at Beaufort, North Carolina, in 1859 by Josiah Pender and destroyed by a hurricane in 1879.

== 1900-1929 ==
The line of the Atlantic and North Carolina Railroad Company was leased to a predecessor of Norfolk & Southern Railroad Company (1906) and its successor in reorganization, Norfolk Southern Railroad Company (incorporated in Virginia, May 2, 1910), until the lease was forfeited in 1934 for non-payment of rent. The Interstate Commerce Commission (ICC) authorized Norfolk Southern Railroad's (of 1910) abandonment of operations of the Atlantic and North Carolina. The ICC found that Atlantic and North Carolina rightfully resumed operation of the line after the default.

== 1930-1955 ==
The Atlantic and North Carolina Railroad Company was leased to the Atlantic and East Carolina Railroad Company, effective August 1, 1939, under authority granted by the ICC.

The Atlantic and East Carolina Railway Company had been chartered under the general corporation laws of North Carolina on June 19, 1939, with charter power to lease and operate the line of the Atlantic and North Carolina Railroad Company. The issues of stock by the Atlantic and East Carolina were authorized by the ICC. The ICC also approved the new Atlantic and East Carolina Railway's lease of the Atlantic and North Carolina Railroad.

In 1942, the ICC authorized the Atlantic and North Carolina Railroad Company to issue certain promissory notes to purchase 1.43 miles (2.30 km) of spur track from Havelock, North Carolina, to a United States reservation under construction (Camp Lejeune) from its lessee, Atlantic and East Carolina Railway Company, because Atlantic and North Carolina considered the spur to be an essential part of its line. Atlantic and East Carolina had organized the Cherry Point Railroad Company for the purpose of constructing the spur.

=== Passenger operations ===
In this period passenger services changed from running under the name of the Atlantic and North Carolina Railroad to the name of Atlantic and East Carolina Railway, in accordance with the leasing change. The railroad offered a once a day train from Goldsboro Union Station to Morehead City. The final Atlantic and East Carolina Railway service would end by 1951. The departures and arrivals at Goldsboro were timed to accommodate a local Southern Railway overnight train (#111/#112, in final years, #11/#112) to parts in central and western North Carolina, comparable to the North Carolina section of the Carolina Special.

== Since 1955 ==
In 1957, the ICC authorized the acquisition of the stock of Atlantic and East Carolina Railroad Company (the lessee operating company) by Southern Railway Company.

Atlantic and North Carolina Railroad Company was merged into North Carolina Railroad Company on September 29, 1989.

The Surface Transportation Board, successor agency to the Interstate Commerce Commission, approved North Carolina Railroad Company's agreement granting to Norfolk Southern Railway Company exclusive local and overhead freight trackage rights to operate over its entire line of railroad between Charlotte, North Carolina, and Morehead City, North Carolina. (Note: The railroad line extends between mileposts EC-0.0+/- and EC-94.7+/-; mileposts H-0.0+/- and H-129.5+/-; and mileposts 284.0+/- and 376.5+/-, a distance of approximately 317.2 miles (510.5 km) in Alamance, Cabarrus, Carteret, Craven, Davidson, Durham, Guilford, Johnston, Jones, Lenoir, Mecklenburg, Orange, Randolph, Rowan, Wake, and Wayne Counties, North Carolina. Under the agreement, Norfolk Southern Railway is permitted to grant trackage rights to its subsidiaries.)

Norfolk Southern Railway Company agreed to grant to its wholly owned subsidiary, Atlantic and East Carolina Railway Company, local and overhead trackage rights to operate over the former Atlantic and North Carolina portion of North Carolina Railroad's line between Goldsboro, North Carolina, and Morehead City, North Carolina. That portion of line extends between mileposts EC-0.0+/- and EC-94.7+/-, a distance of approximately 94.7 miles (152.4 km) in Carteret, Craven, Jones, Lenoir, and Wayne Counties. The exemption was effective on August 19, 1999, and the trackage rights operations began on September 1, 1999. The purpose of the trackage rights was to allow Norfolk Southern Railway and Atlantic and East Carolina Railway to continue as the providers of local and overhead freight service on the respective North Carolina Railroad Company lines, as they had previously done under the expired leases.

In September 2003, Norfolk Southern Railway Company and Atlantic and East Carolina Railway Company filed a verified notice of exemption under the Surface Transportation Board's corporate family class exemption to merge Atlantic and East Carolina Railway Company into Norfolk Southern Railway Company, with Norfolk Southern Railway Company as the surviving entity as early as October 6, 2003.

== See also ==
- Confederate railroads in the American Civil War
