= Berkeley Mall =

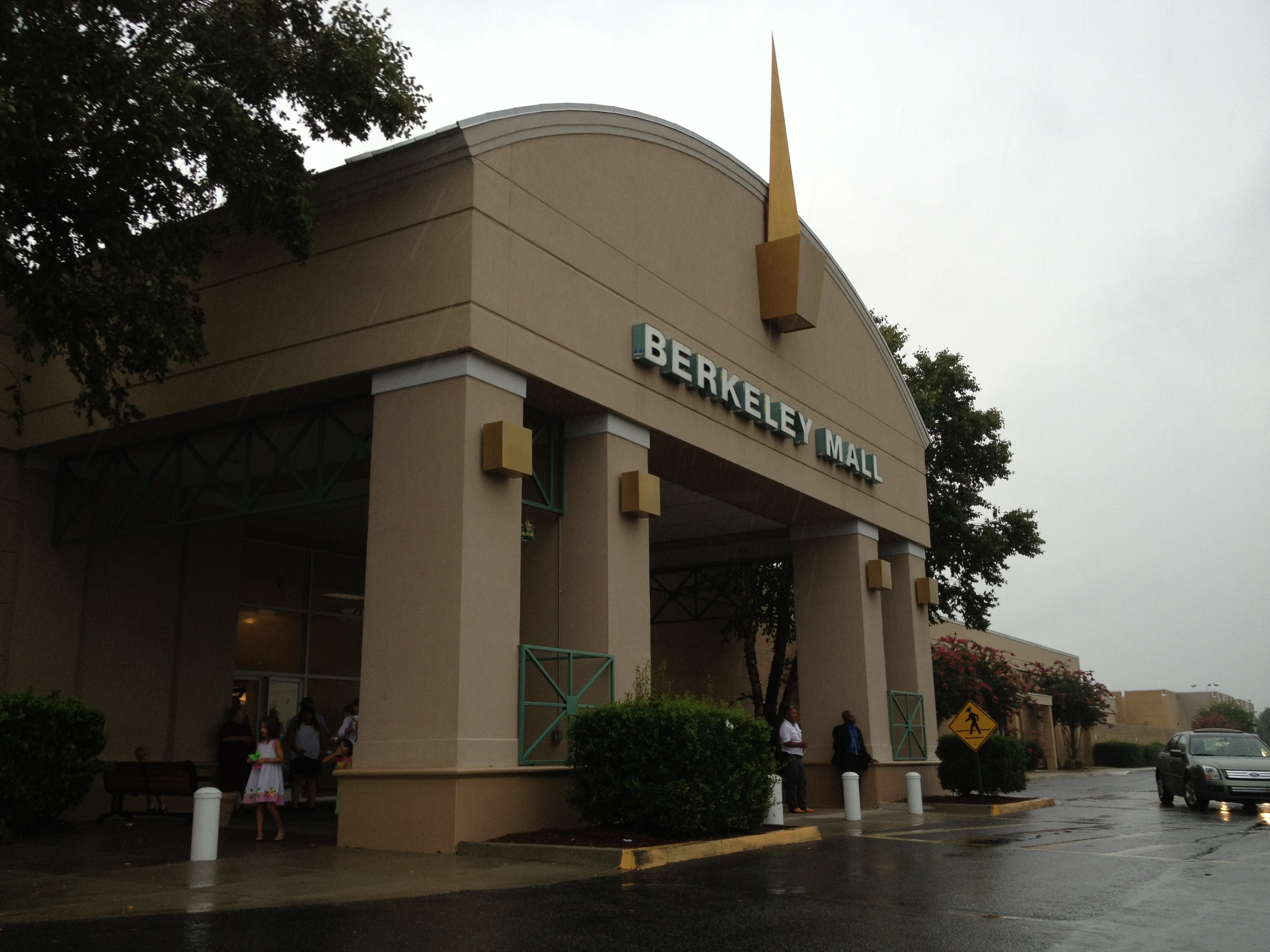
- Entrance to Berkeley Mall, August 2012
- Location: Goldsboro, North Carolina, United States
- Coordinates: 35.37741°N 77.94278°W
- Address: 625 North Berkeley Boulevard
- Opened: 1975
- Developer: D.W. Royster
- Manager: Childress Klein Properties
- Num. of stores: 45
- Num. of anchor tenants: 3 (2 open, 1 vacant)
- Floors: 1
- Website: shopberkeleymall.com

Berkeley Mall is a shopping center in Goldsboro, North Carolina. It is owned by Childress Klein Properties which is headquartered in Charlotte, North Carolina. The Mall has over 40 stores including several outparcel buildings outside the mall complete with several dining options. The anchors are 2 Belk stores, Burlington and JCPenney. The Mall is located at 625 N. Berkeley Blvd right off US 70.

== History ==
Berkeley Mall opened in 1975. One of the original anchors was Weil's, which became Brody's, which was sold to Proffitt's in 1998, and again to Belk in 2006. Jo-Ann Fabrics opened at the mall in 2013.

Berkeley Mall suffered roof damage near the Belk store on August 27, 2011, as a result of Hurricane Irene moving through eastern North Carolina.

On October 15, 2018, it was announced that Sears would be closing as part of a plan to close 142 stores nationwide.

In early 2025, Jo-Ann Stores filed for bankruptcy, leading to all Joann Fabrics locations, including the store at Berkeley Mall to close.
