= Daniel E. Weber =

American academic

4th Executive Vice President Institute of Food Technologists
- In office 1991 – 2003 (retired)

Personal details
- Born: 1940 (age 84–85)
- Education: DePaul University (graduate 1962)
- Occupation: Admin Assistant, IFT.

Daniel E. Weber (born 1940) was the fourth Executive Vice President of the Institute of Food Technologists (IFT), serving in that manner from 1991 until his 2003 retirement.

== Early career ==
A 1962 graduate of DePaul University in Business Management, Weber began his career at the American Oil Chemists' Society (AOCS) in Urbana, Illinois, United States as Administrative Assistant to the Executive Director. While at AOCS, he earned a certificate in Association Management from the Institute of Organizational Management at Michigan State University in East Lansing, Michigan.

== Service with IFT ==
In 1967, Weber left AOCS to join IFT in Chicago, Illinois, United States as Administrative Manager, reporting to then-Executive Director Calvert L. Willey. Two years later, he would be promoted to Director of Convention Services, with responsibilities for the IFT Annual Meeting and their associated exhibits, now called the Food Expo, along with advertising, sales, marketing, and membership development. Weber would be promoted to Director of Marketing and Meetings in 1979, a position he would stay at until the 1991 Annual Meeting & Food Expo in Dallas, Texas when then-Executive Director Howard W. Mattson suffered a heart attack and would be forced to retire. Weber was named interim Executive Director of IFT, then made permanent Executive Director on August 1, 1991. His position of Executive Director would change to Executive Vice President and Chief Executive Officer in 1999, a position he would hold until his August 7, 2003. As of 2007, he is the longest serving employee in the Institute's history.

== Accomplishments with IFT ==
- Membership growth increasing from 8,000 in 1967 to 28,000 in 2003 with IFT's budget's increasing from $600,000 to $17 million, including the IFT Foundation.
- Development of the "Three Presidents" model of governance to provide continued focus on IFT's growth and enhancement of volunteer leadership capabilities.
- Establishment of IFT's offices in Washington, DC.
- Increasing the number Technical papers at the IFT Annual Meeting from 155 in 1967 to 1739 in 2003, the number of exhibit booths from 211 to 2400, and the number of attendees from 2100 to 22,000.
- The development of IFT divisions from zero in 1967 to 27 in 2003.
- Creation of IFT's official website in 1996 (http://www.ift.org).

== Awards and memberships ==
- Meeting Planner of the Year (1990) - Association for Convention Operations Management
- Calvert L. Willey Award (2001) - IFT
- Achievement Award (2002) - Professional Convention Management Association (PCMA)
- Convention Industry Council's Hall of Leaders (2002) - bronze plaque permanently on location both at the Washington, D.C. Convention Center and at McCormick Place in Chicago.
- Member of the Council of Engineering and Scientific Society Executives, Convention Industry Council, American Society of Association Executives, Chicago Society of Association Executives, Professional Convention Management Association (President), International Association for Exposition Management (President), Center for Exhibition Industry Research, Association Forum, and the IACVB Foundation.

== Family ==
Married to wife Char in 1961, they have two daughters (Judy and Nancy), one son (Dan), and nine grandchildren.
