= Calvert L. Willey =

Second Executive Vice President of Institute of Food Technologists (1961–1997)

Personal details
- Born: December 11, 1920
- Died: April 12, 1994 (aged 73); Chicago, Illinois, US
- Occupation: Management consultant, Submariner

Calvert L. Willey (December 11, 1920 – April 12, 1994) was the second Executive Vice President of the Institute of Food Technologists, serving in that manner from 1961 until his 1987 retirement.

== Early career ==
A Lieutenant Commander in the United States Navy submarine service during World War II, Willey returned home to complete his studies at the University of Maryland, College Park in business and policy administration. Following graduation, he worked for a management consultant. After that he worked as an assistant to the executive director for the National Society of Professional Engineers, then known as the National Association of Professional Engineers.

== Move to Chicago ==
In 1956, Willey became executive director of the American Society of Lubrication Engineers in Chicago, Illinois, now the Society of Tribologists and Lubrication Engineers (since 1987), and would be executive director until he accepted the position of Executive Secretary for the Institute of Food Technologists (IFT). Prior to his departure to IFT, Willey had an article in Science magazine that was published on June 2, 1961.

== IFT role and service ==
Joining IFT in 1961, Willey would start making changes within the Institute to consolidate the activities and services provided to its members. In 1966, publishing was reorganized and centralized in Chicago with a publications director being created that year. A Field Services director position was created in 1968 to act as a liaison between IFT sections and divisions. To assist in growth of IFT membership and circulation, IFT started using computer bureaus in 1972 and had developed an in-house computer system in 1982 that has been continuously upgraded. In 1973, IFT created the Director of Public Information which evolved into the Office of Scientific Public Affairs, then Science Communications, and is now known as of 2006 as the Science Communications and Government Relations]with offices in Chicago and Washington, D.C. IFT created the Marketing and Membership director position in 1979 and added sales staff in 1980. During his 26 year reign as executive director, changed from executive secretary in 1966, IFT's membership increased from 6,000 members with a $200,000 budget and a staff of Willey and his secretary in 1961 to 23,000 members with a $5 million budget and a staff of over 30 employees.

== Accomplishments ==
In a September 1989 Food Technology written by Willey, he stated that his three greatest accomplished were:

- Creation of the International Food Information Service in 1968, for which he was a co-founder. They are the main administrators of the Food Science and Technology Abstracts and are headquartered in Reading, United Kingdom.
- SOS/70, the Third International Congress of Food Science and Technology in Washington, D.C., held in 1970 that would lead to the creation of the International Union of Food Science and Technology that same year.
- The IFT Public Information Program in 1973, which was detailed in the previous section.

== Awards and memberships ==
- First winner of the IFT Calvert L. Willey Award in 1987.
- Member of the Council of Engineering and Scientific Society Executives, American Society of Association Executives, Chicago Society of Association Executives, Professional Convention Management Association, and International Association for Exposition Management.

== Death ==
Willey died in Chicago on April 12, 1994, at 73.
