= ExOrdo =

Ex Ordo is cloud-based conference management software for association and academic conferences, congresses and symposia. Ex Ordo combines a core abstract management functionality with a registration system, scheduling software, and a mobile conference app. It is used by conferences in 58 countries across a wide set of research fields.

== History ==
Ex Ordo was conceived in 2008 by Paul Killoran when he was still an engineering student at NUI Galway. While helping one of his lecturers organise a conference,

Ex Ordo has since grown to become conference management software that includes delegate registration, conference scheduling and the ability to build a book of proceedings.

== Awards and recognition ==
Awarded Best New Web Application 2011 and Best Practice 2011 awarded by the Realex Fire Web Awards.

Named a Top 10 Abstract Management System for Academia by Event Industry News in 2016.

Ex Ordo is backed by Enterprise Ireland.

== See also ==
- Abstract management
- Research or academic conferences
- Peer review
- Proceedings
