= Thessaloniki Convention & Visitors Bureau =

Thessaloniki Convention & Visitors Bureau—known as TCVB (in Greek: Αστική Εταιρεία Συνεδρίων & Επισκεπτών Θεσσαλονίκης)—was the first such bureau that operated in Greece. It was founded by the Thessaloniki Hotel Association (THA) in 2000, operated as a non‑profit organization and was active until 2009. The main goal of TCVB was to establish the city of Thessaloniki as an internationally recognized conference city and a popular destination for incentive travel.

== Membership and supporters ==
Although initially founded by THA, an amendment of TCVB by–laws allowed all types of companies in Thessaloniki to join (as shareholders or as members), and to play an active role in the strategy and operation of the bureau. Members were drawn from the city’s conference trade, including congress organizers, public relation firms, suppliers of audiovisual systems, travel and tourist agencies, caterers, restaurateurs and retailers.

Several leading bodies in the city were granted honorary membership for contributing to the success of the bureau. TCVB operated under the auspices of the Ministry of Tourism, the Ministry of Macedonia and Thrace, the National Tourism Organization, the Region of Central Macedonia, the Prefecture Office and the Municipality of Thessaloniki. It also enjoyed the support of the Thessaloniki Tourism Organization, the Aristotle University of Thessaloniki, the Thessaloniki Traders Association, the Thessaloniki Port Authority and HELEXPO S.A.

== Management ==
President

- 2000—2009 Vassilios Brovas
- 2009–2014 Yiannis Aslanis

Director

- 2000–2009 Helena Milona

Board of Directors
The President and Board of Directors were elected by the general assembly. The board included representatives of the hotel and tourism industry of Thessaloniki, as well as the regional governments, and other local companies and organizations.

== Activities and services ==
TCVB Services were provided on a non-profit basis. Activities included:

- marketing Thessaloniki as a conference destination.
- creation of marketing material both on and off-line.
- media relations.
- providing information, promotional material and bidding assistance to associations, companies, and other conference organizers.
- participation in international conference and incentive market exhibitions such as IMEX, EIBTM, CONFEX, BTC, etc.
- organizing educational & networking events.
- organizing familiarization or inspection trips to Thessaloniki (for P.C.O.s, press etc).
- maintaining a database of association market conferences taking place in Greece.
- conducting research and providing annual statistical information on the Thessaloniki conference trade.
- collaboration with local authorities and organizations.
- collaboration with national and international associations and organizations of the Conference and Incentive market.

TCVB was the first organization to supply the ICCA with information about conference activity in Thessaloniki, recording annual figures for local, national and international conferences held in the town. Thessaloniki ranked among the 100 most popular conference destinations in the world, according to figures issued by ICCA. In 2007, the city was ranked 67th in the world tables, hosting 224 conferences including 21 international conferences.

== Participation in international Associations ==
The TCVB was an active member of:

- International Congress and Convention Association (ICCA)
- Destination Marketing Association International (DMAI)
- Meetings Professional International (MPI)
- Society of Incentive & Travel Executives (SITE)
- ECM – European Cities Marketing
- SKAL International

== Accomplishments ==
TCVB was the first Convention & Visitors Bureau to operate in Greece, thus pioneering CVB operations and destination marketing for conferences in Greece. The bureau contributed to the increase of conferences taking place in Thessaloniki during the period 2000—2009; the total number of conferences held in the town increased from 39 in 2001 to 268 in 2008.

The bureau supported many campaigns of significant importance for the Greek Conference market including the creation of a National Convention Bureau, the funding of a national campaign for the promotion of conference tourism in Greece, the development of statistic information related to the conference market on a national level and the official certification of Greek professional congress organizers.

Throughout its existence, the bureau assisted in organizing numerous conferences held in Thessaloniki including ACTRIMS/ECTRIMS (European Committee for Treatment and Research in Multiple Sclerosis) 2005; the 21st Congress of the European Committee for Treatment and Research in Multiple Sclerosis and the 10th Annual Meeting of the Americas Committee for Treatment and Research in Multiple Sclerosis. Held in Ioannis Vellidis Congress Center (HELEXPO) from September 28 to October 1, 2005, these were two of the largest conferences held in Thessaloniki, with over 4.500 participants each. The bureau provided support and assistance at various stages of the conference bidding and planning process. The 30th World Conference of the International Society for Music Education (ISME 2012) was held in Thessaloniki Concert Hall from July 15 to July 20, 2012 attracting 2.500 participants from around the world. The bureau contributed to the successful bid for this conference and assisted in the conference planning.

== Awards ==
In 2008, TCVB received the prestigious award of the Hellenic Association of Professional Congress Organizers – HAPCO. In 2010 TCVB President Vassilios Brovas was awarded the SITE Greece – IMIC Award of Excellence for his outstanding contribution to the establishment of Thessaloniki as a conference and incentive destination, and for his commitment to the development of business tourism in Greece.

== Closure ==
In an attempt to raise funds for its activities the bureau agreed to merge with Thessaloniki Tourism Organization (TTO) in spring 2009. Its office was relocated to TTO premises but even though this relocation enabled the bureau to minimize operational costs, the office at TTO remained inactive, allegedly through inefficient bureaucracy. In 2014 a new non-profit company (bearing no relation to TCVB) called Thessaloniki Convention Bureau (TCB) was established, with Yiannis Aslanis at its head.
