= Cape Fear and Yadkin Valley Railway =

Railroad in the Southeastern United States

- Original route of the Main Line (red) and the Bennettsville Branch (dark red). Click to enlarge.

Overview
- Predecessor: Western Railroad; Mount Airy Railroad
- Successor: Atlantic Coast Line Railroad; Southern Railway; Atlantic and Yadkin Railway

Technical
- Track gauge: 4 ft 8 1/2 in (1,435 mm) standard gauge

The Cape Fear and Yadkin Valley Railway was a Southeastern railroad that operated in the Carolinas immediately after Reconstruction. It ran from Mount Airy, North Carolina, southeast through Greensboro and Fayetteville to the Atlantic port of Wilmington, North Carolina. A significant branch also ran from Fayetteville south to Bennettsville, South Carolina.

== History ==
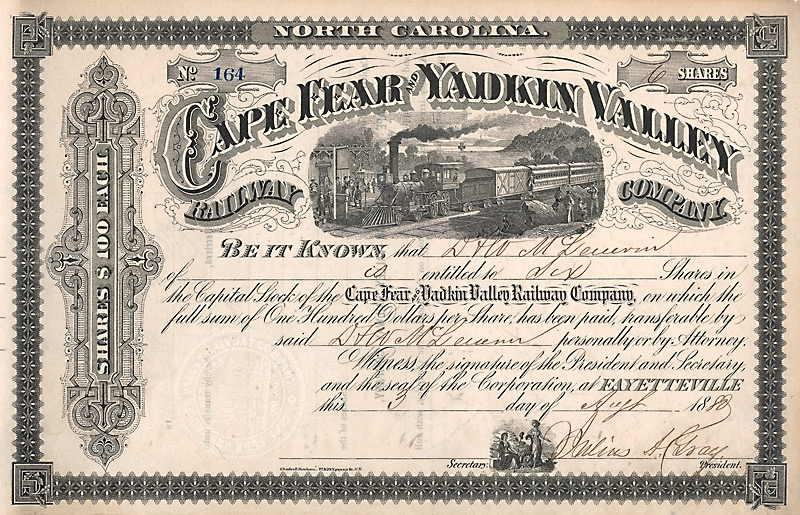
Share of Cape Fear and Yadkin Valley Railway from 3 August 1880

The Cape Fear and Yadkin Valley Railway was created in 1879 with the consolidation of the Western Railroad and the Mount Airy Railroad.

By 1899, the Cape Fear and Yadkin Valley Railway was debt-ridden and bankrupt and was sold to the Southern Railway, where it was reorganized as a new company under the name Atlantic and Yadkin Railway, which remained a wholly owned subsidiary of the Southern Railway.

The newly created Atlantic and Yadkin then sold back the southern half of the line from Sanford, North Carolina, to Wilmington to the Wilmington and Weldon Railroad, which was later reorganized as the Atlantic Coast Line Railroad (ACL) in 1899. The Atlantic Coast Line Railroad operated their segment of the line as their Sanford Branch (E Branch west of Fayetteville and F Branch east of there). The Atlantic Coast Line also took over the Bennettsville Branch. Though, since the northern part of the Bennettsville Branch paralleled the ACL's main line, they abandoned the branch between Fayetteville and Parkton and connected the remaining branch to the main line at Parkton. The Atlantic Coast Line incorporated the remaining Bennettsville Branch into their Parkton—Sumter Line.

The Atlantic Coast Line Railroad became the Seaboard Coast Line Railroad in 1967, and their segment of the line from Manchester to Wilington became their Fayetteville Subdivision. The Seaboard Coast Line became CSX Transportation in the 1980s.

The Cape Fear and Yadkin Valley Railway Passenger Depot at Fayetteville, North Carolina, and the Rural Hall Depot at Rural Hall, North Carolina, were listed on the National Register of Historic Places in 1983.

== Current conditions ==
Today, parts of the original Cape Fear and Yadkin Valley Railway are still in service. From Mount Airy to Rural Hall, the line is now operated by the Yadkin Valley Railroad, a shortline that also operates the former Southern Railway line from Rural Hall to North Wilkesboro.

The line is largely abandoned from Rural Hall to just northwest of Greensboro. The Atlantic and Yadkin Greenway now runs on the former right of way northwest of Greensboro.

From Greensboro to Gulf, the line is still operated by Norfolk Southern Railway.

The segment from Cumnock to Sanford is now operated by the Atlantic and Western Railway.

CSX still operates the line from Spring Lake to just southeast of Fayetteville as well as a short discontinuous segment near Wilmington.

The Bennettsville Branch is still in service from Parkton to Red Springs and is now operated by the Red Springs & Northern Railroad. The line was abandoned between Red Springs and McColl in 1973.

== Stations ==
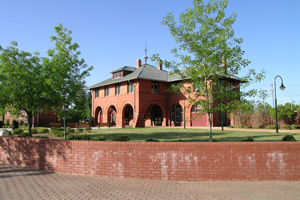
Original Fayetteville depot. It is now the Fayetteville Area Transportation Museum.

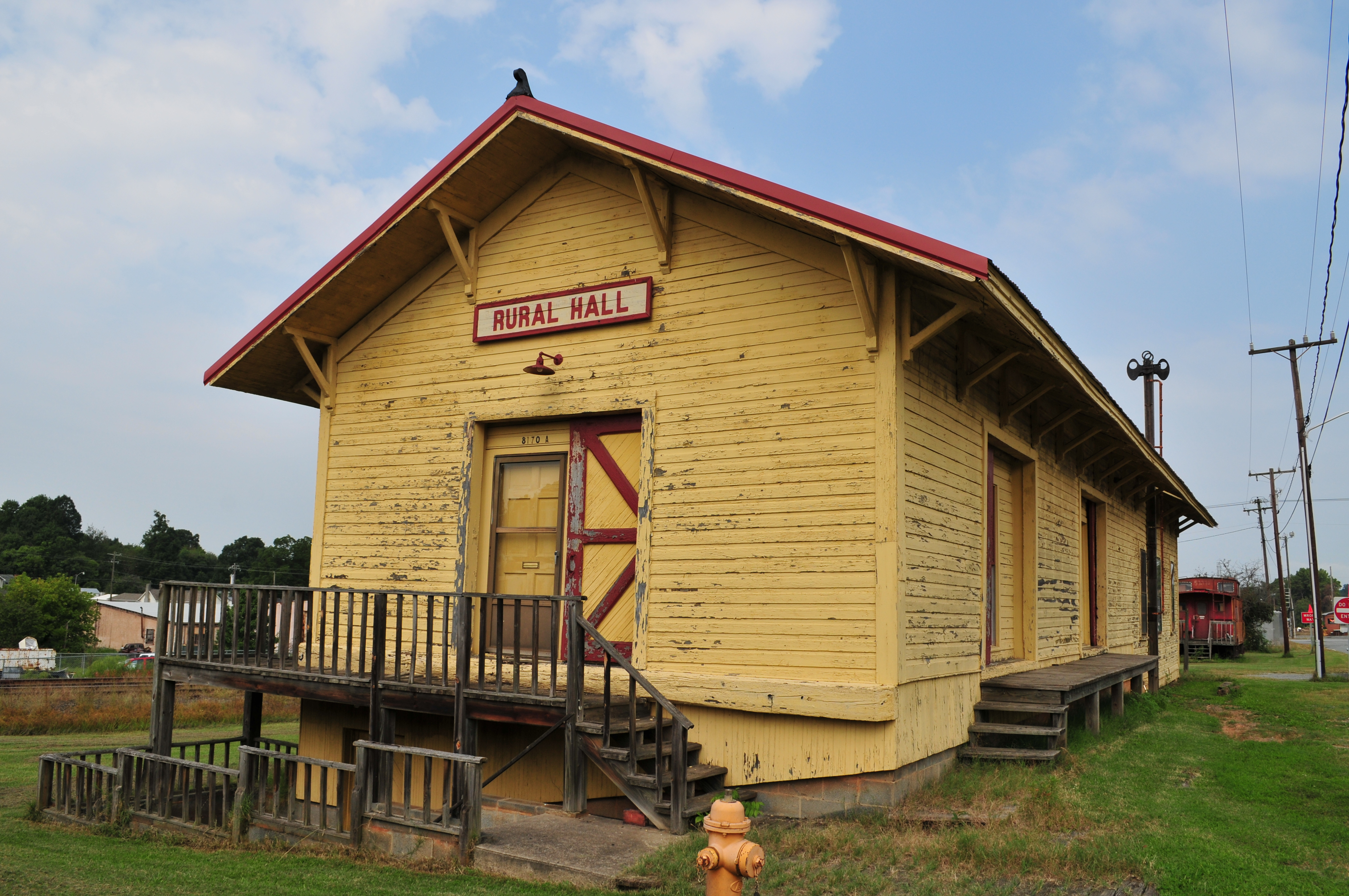
Rural Hall Depot.

Main Line
Miles from Wilmington	System Milepost (Note: Milepost numbers are in accordance with the Atlantic Coast Line Railroad (now CSX) and Southern Railway (now Norfolk Southern) networks.)	City/Location	Station	Connections and notes
0.0	AC 244.5	Wilmington	Wilmington	located on Wilmington and Manchester Railroad
2.1	AC 246.6; AF 290.7		Yadkin Junction	junction with Wilmington and Manchester Railroad (ACL)
9.1	AF 283.7		Richards	
15.9	AF 276.9		Montague	
18.7	AF 274.1		Currie	
25.0	AF 267.8	Atkinson	Atkinson	
32.1	AF 260.7		Ivanhoe	
36.5	AF 256.3		Kerr	
41.1	AF 251.7		Tomahawk	
47.4	AF 245.4	Garland	Garland	
52.0	AF 240.9		Parkersburg	
56.6	AF 236.3		Mintz	
60.9	AF 232.0	Roseboro	Roseboro	
65.9	AF 227.0		Hayne	
69.1	AF 223.8	Autryville	Autryville	
72.3	AF 220.7	Stedman	Stedman	
76.6	AF 215.0		Vander	
81.3	AF 209.2; AE 209.2	Fayetteville	Fayetteville	junction with: Bennettsville Branch; Fayetteville Cutoff (ACL); Aberdeen and Rockfish Railroad
81.7	AE 209.1	Fayetteville	Norfolk Southern Junction	junction with Raleigh and Southport Railroad (NS)
88.7	AE 204.3		Shaw	
91.8	AE 201.5		Fort Junction	
95.2	AE 197.7		Manchester	
97.7	AE 195.2		Overhills	
101.7	AE 97.7		Spout Springs	
109.0	AE 90.4		Rock Branch	later renamed Olivia
110.4	AE 89.0		Swann	
116.3	AE 83.1		Jonesboro	
118.5	AE 80.9; CF 130.1	Sanford	Sanford	junction with: Raleigh and Augusta Air Line Railroad (SAL); Atlantic and Western Railway
124.9	CF 123.6		Cumnock	originally known as Egypt
127.9			Gulf	junction with Raleigh, Charlotte and Southern Railway (NS)
131.3	CF 117.2	Goldston	Goldston	
134.5			Bear Creek	
137.7			Bonlee	junction with Bonlee and Western Railway
139.3			Mount Vernon Springs	
143.8			Siler City	
151.3	CF 97.2	Staley	Staley	
155.8		Liberty	Liberty	
132.9			Julian	
165.5			Climax	
171.2		Pleasant Garden	Pleasant Garden	
174.8			Vandalia	
179.1	CF 69.4	Greensboro	Greensboro	junction with North Carolina Railroad (SOU)
185.3			Battle Ground	
191.0		Summerfield	Summerfield	
194.0			Guil Quarry	
197.2	CF 51.3	Stokesdale	Stokesdale	
202.4			Belews Creek	
205.3			Mitchell	
208.4			Walnut Grove	junction with Norfolk and Western Railway
214.0			Germanton	
218.6	CF 29.8	Rural Hall	Rural Hall	junction with Southern Railway
223.5		King	King	
226.6			Dalton	
228.5			Pinnacle	
234.1	CF 14.4	Pilot Mountain	Pilot Mountain	
236.8			Dodson's Bridge Crossing	
240.1			Ararat	
245.5			McKenney's Cut	
248.5	CF 0.0	Mount Airy	Mount Airy	

Bennettsville Branch
State	Miles from Fayetteville	System Milepost	City/Location	Station	Connections and notes
NC	0.0		Fayetteville	Fayetteville	junction with: Main Line; Aberdeen and Rockfish Railroad
NC	6.7		Hope Mills	Hope Mills	junction with Fayetteville Cutoff (ACL)
NC	13.1		Parkton	Parkton	junction with Atlantic Coast Line Railroad Main Line (via connection track built in 1899 after the line north was abandoned)
NC	14.8	AG 224.9		McNatt's	
NC	17.5	AG 227.6	Lumber Bridge	Lumber Bridge	
NC	22.1	AG 232.2		Shannon	
NC	25.4	AG 235.5	Red Springs	Red Springs	
NC	30.0	AG 240.1	Wakulla	Wakulla	
NC	34.0	AG 244.1		Floral College	
NC	37.0	AG 247.1	Maxton	Maxton	junction with Carolina Central Railroad (SAL)
NC	39.0	AG 249.1		Patterson	
NC	41.1	AG 251.2		Stuart	
NC	43.1	AG 253.2		John's	junction with Laurinburg and Southern Railroad
NC	45.2	AG 255.3		Hasty	
SC	49.4	AG 259.5	McColl	McColl	junction with North and South Carolina Railway (SAL)
SC	52.1	AG 262.2	Tatum	Tatum	
SC	58.1	AG 268.2	Bennettsville	Bennettsville	continues as Charleston, Sumter and Northern Railroad (ACL) junction with Bennettsville and Cheraw Railroad
