= Paul Peters (publisher) =

Biographies

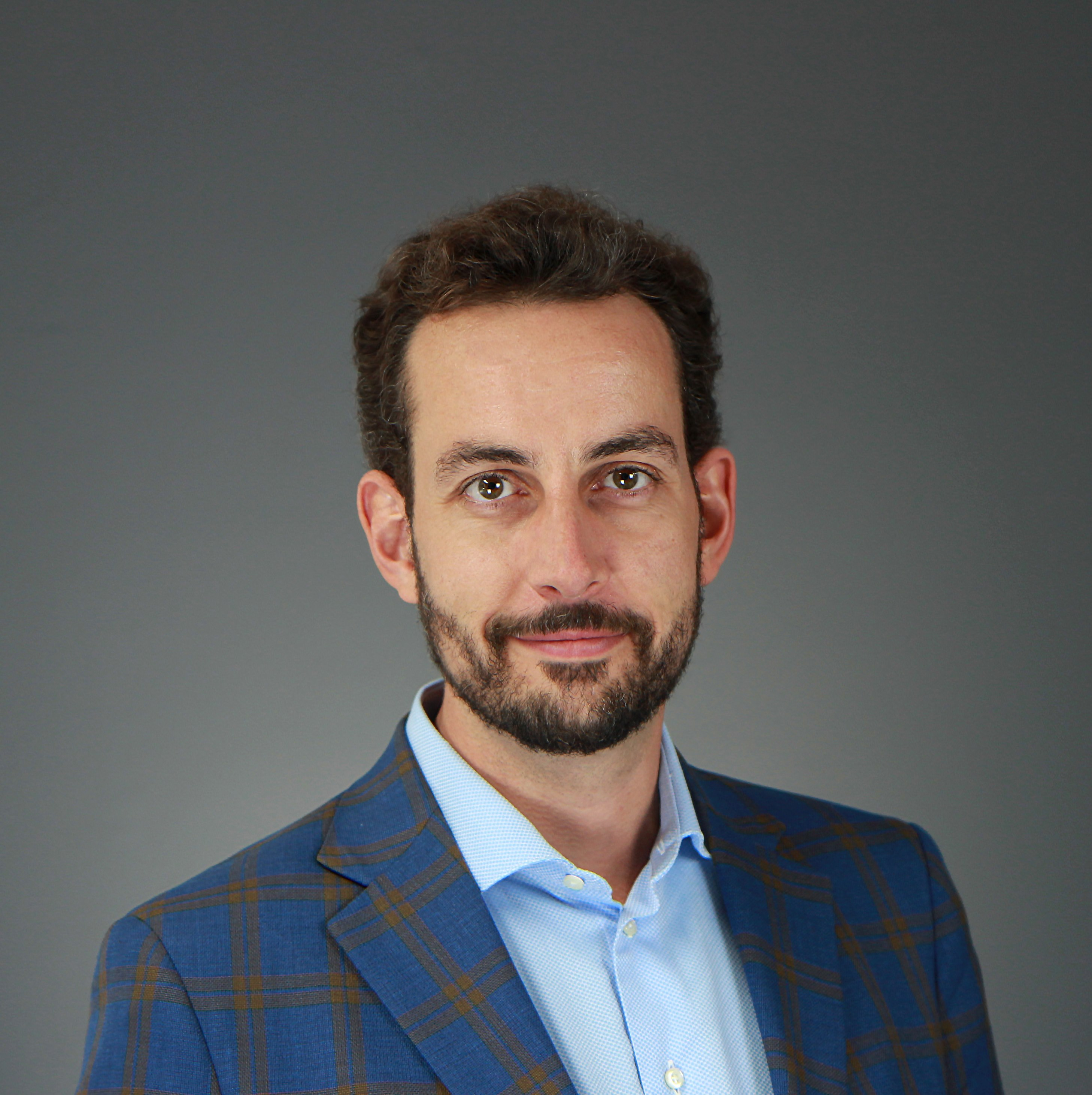
Paul Peters

Paul Harvey Peters (born September 24, 1982) is an angel investor and podcast host working in the scholarly communications industry. He is currently the non-Executive Board Chair of online conference software provider ExOrdo, co-founder of the Scholarly Angels investment syndicate, and host of the podcast Midnight at the Casablanca.

From 2015 to 2021 Peters was the chief executive Officer of the Open Access publisher Hindawi. He was chair of the Board of Directors of Crossref from 2017 to 2020 and was President of the Open Access Scholarly Publishers Association (OASPA) from 2013 to 2019. Peters is known for his work as an advocate for Open Access, open infrastructure for Open Science, and research integrity in the published literature.

== Early life ==
Peters was born in Cambridge, Massachusetts, on September 24, 1982, where his parents both taught chemistry at Harvard. The family moved to Boulder, Colorado in 1984 where Paul went to Bixby Elementary School, Baseline Middle School, and Fairview High School.

== Education ==
He was educated at the College of William and Mary from 2000 to 2004 where he completed his bachelor's degree in Middle Eastern Studies. While at William and Mary, he spent his junior year abroad at the American University in Cairo (AUC).

== Professional life ==
Upon finishing college aged 21, Peters returned to Cairo. He applied for a temporary copy editing position at Hindawi, but was then hired to develop Hindawi's Open Access journal program. At the time, Hindawi was a subscription publisher with a portfolio of 14 journals. He led the conversion of Hindawi's journal portfolio to open access, making it one of the first subscription publishers to convert fully to an APC-funded open access model in 2007.

In 2008, Hindawi joined nine other publishers to found the Open Access Scholarly Publishers Association (OASPA), which was born out of the Nordic Conference on Scholarly Communications. He was a founding board member of OASPA and was elected President of the organization on March 15, 2013.

In 2015, he was appointed chief executive officer of Hindawi. He restructured the company creating a new limited liability company located in London, Hindawi Ltd. In 2017, he instigated Hindawi's resignation from the International Association of Scientific, Technical, and Medical Publishers (STM) in protest over their lack of support for open access publishing. Peters has also been critical of the blacklisting of certain open access journals by librarian Jeffrey Beall.

Peters served as a Nominated Member on the European Commission’s working group on the development and implementation of open science in Europe – the European Open Science Policy Platform from 2016 to 2017. He has been on the Board of Directors of Crossref since 2009 where he is currently the board chair, and he is a former board member of the International Association of Scientific, Technical, and Medical Publishers. He appeared in the 2018 feature-length documentary about open access, Paywall: the business of scholarship.

In 2018, Paul Peters proposed the concept of the OA Switchboard and convened a meeting of key stakeholders in December 2018 to develop the idea. The OA Switchboard was formally launched on 31 January 2020.

In February 2021, having successfully completed the sale of Hindawi to Wiley for $298m he announced his intention to leave his role as CEO to focus full time on his family Since leaving Hindawi, Peters has worked as an investor and advisor to several technology startups in the publishing industry, including the online scholarly conference platform ExOrdo where he serves as the non-Executive Board Chair. In 2024, Peters co-founded the Scholarly Angels investment syndicate, which has invested in seven technology startups working in the scholarly communications industry.

In 2024, Peters launched the podcast Midnight at the Casablanca where he hosts long-form interviews with founders and executives from across the scholarly communications industry, alongside his co-host Lauren Kane.

== Personal life ==
Peters moved from Cairo to London in 2013. He is an amateur skydiver and a vegan. On 20 July 2019 he married Maria Burnuz in London. In January 2021 their son was born. In 2022 he moved to Como, Italy.

== Family ==
His mother is Veronica Vaida is an atmospheric chemist and his father, Kevin Peters was an emeritus professor of chemistry (both at the University of Colorado Boulder). He has one sister, Katherine Heaton (née Peters) who is an attorney.
