= Cirrus Insight =

Customer relationship management platform

Coordinates: 35.784147°N 78.649165°W

- Industry: Customer relationship management
- Founded: 1 April 2011
- Founders: Ryan Huff, Brandon Bruce
- Headquarters: Raleigh, North Carolina (headquarters), Irvine, California, and Knoxville, Tennessee, United States
- Key people: Phil Dixon, Chief Executive Officer
- Products: Web applications
- Number of employees: 57
- Parent: Cirruspath
- Website: www.cirrusinsight.com

Cirrus Insight is a customer relationship management (CRM) integration and sales productivity platform that connects Salesforce with email and calendar applications such as Gmail and Microsoft Outlook. The platform enables users to manage CRM data, track communications, and automate sales workflows directly from their inbox.

Originally known for its Salesforce integration, Cirrus Insight has expanded to include meeting scheduling, automation tools, and artificial intelligence (AI) features such as conversation intelligence and workflow automation.

== Product Functionality ==
Cirrus Insight provides a suite of tools designed to integrate Salesforce functionality directly into email and calendar environments, reducing the need to switch between applications and improving data accuracy within CRM systems.

=== Core CRM Integration ===
The platform enables two-way synchronization between Salesforce and email systems, allowing users to log emails, track communications, and update CRM records from within Gmail or Outlook.

It also provides an in-email sidebar that displays Salesforce data, including contacts, leads, and opportunities, and allows users to create or edit records without leaving their inbox.

==== Email and Activity Tracking ====
Cirrus Insight includes tools for tracking email opens, link clicks, and attachment engagement, as well as scheduling emails and automating follow-ups.

All activities, including emails, meetings, and tasks, can be automatically logged to Salesforce to maintain accurate and up-to-date CRM data.

==== Calendar and Meeting Scheduling ====
The platform integrates with Google and Microsoft calendars to enable meeting scheduling, calendar sharing, and automated event synchronization with Salesforce.

Its scheduling tools allow users to share availability and route meetings to appropriate team members based on predefined criteria.

=== AI and Automation Features ===
Cirrus Insight incorporates AI-driven functionality to automate sales workflows and improve decision-making. These include:

- Conversation intelligence, which captures and analyzes sales conversations to provide insights and context
- Meeting intelligence, including automated research and preparation for sales calls
- CRM automation, which suggests or executes updates to maintain data accuracy
- Buyer signals, which track customer engagement such as email opens and interactions

These tools are designed to reduce manual data entry, improve forecasting accuracy, and provide real-time insights into customer interactions.

=== Workflow Automation and Pipeline Management ===
Cirrus Insight supports automated workflows for lead routing, follow-ups, and pipeline management, helping sales teams track opportunities and manage deals more efficiently.

The platform also provides reporting and analytics on sales activity and engagement.

== History ==
Cirruspath was founded by Ryan Huff and Brandon Bruce, two friends who met while at University of California, Santa Barbara. Their first product was Cirrus Insight, launched in 2011, and it was inspired by the existing tools for Microsoft Outlook integration with Salesforce.

In 2013, the company released an iOS mobile application, Cirrus Insight Mobile, to support mobile users. Also in 2013, Cirrus Insight partnered with UberConference to integrate conference calls through email chains. The integration eliminated the need for Salesforce and Cirrus Insight customers to dial in and use PINs for conference calls.

In May 2014, Cirruspath announced Cirrus Files, a program designed to allow the integration of Google Drive with Salesforce.

In June 2014, Cirruspath announced two new products for Cirrus Insight: Gmail email tracking, allowing users to get real-time alerts as their emails were opened, and Cirrus Insight Analytics, a free package that generates management reports showing usage and adoption of Cirrus Insight and Salesforce.com.

In October 2016, Cirruspath released Cirrus Insight 5.0, which completely updated the design of the app and added improvements to recently added features such as Book Meeting and Email Campaigns.

In August 2020, Cirrus Insight merged with ZynBit, a Salesforce email and calendar integration provider focused on Microsoft Outlook. The merger combined the companies’ respective Gmail and Outlook integrations, expanding Cirrus Insight’s capabilities across email platforms and strengthening its position within the Salesforce ecosystem.

Following the merger, Phil Dixon, former CEO of ZynBit, became Chief Executive Officer of the combined company.

By the mid-2020s, Cirrus Insight expanded its platform beyond core CRM integration to include automation, sales engagement tools, and artificial intelligence-driven features aimed at improving sales productivity and customer interaction tracking.
