= Doug Traub =

American marketing executive

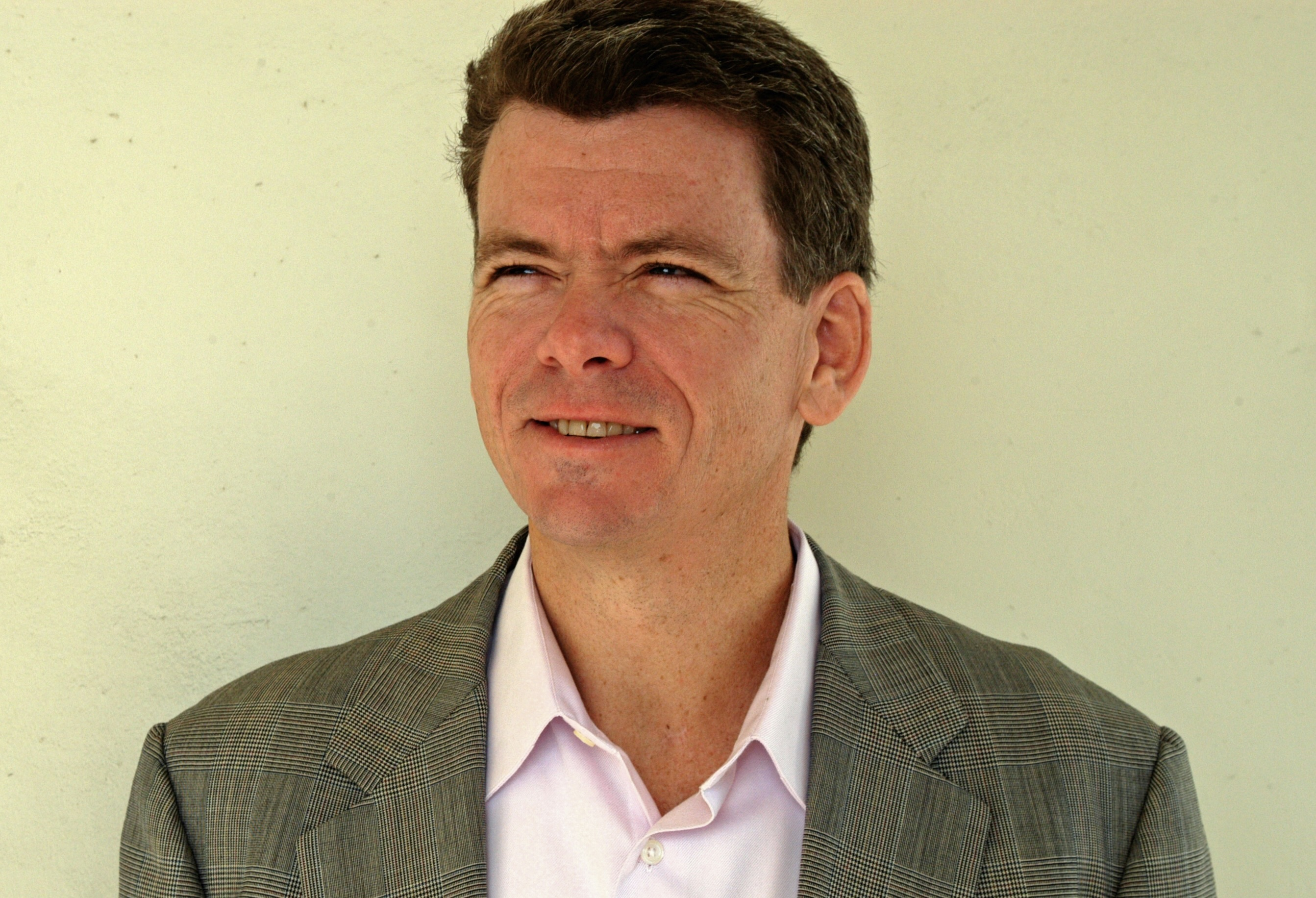
- Traub in 2002.
- Born: New York, NY
- Education: University of North Carolina at Chapel Hill, BA; Mercer University (Atlanta), MBA

Douglas Childs Traub is an American marketing executive who has led destination marketing organizations in multiple communities across the United States. He is best known for leading the campaign that established the Surf City USA brand and secured its federal trademark registration for Huntington Beach, California

== Early life and education ==
Traub was born in New York City. He earned a bachelor’s degree from the University of North Carolina at Chapel Hill and a master’s degree in business administration at Mercer University (Atlanta). He achieved accreditation (APR) from the Public Relations Society of America in 1984 and was named a Certified Destination Management Executive (CDME) by the International Association of Convention & Visitor Bureaus (now Destinations International) in 2004.

== Professional marketing career ==
Traub began his career working in public relations agencies in New York City and Atlanta before moving into corporate marketing roles with companies including Georgia-Pacific and NYNEX. In 1991, he joined Zoo Atlanta as marketing director. He later served as marketing director of the Jekyll Island Authority.

=== Fayetteville, North Carolina ===
Traub was named President and Chief Executive Officer of the Fayetteville Area Convention & Visitors Bureau (now Distinctly Fayetteville) in 1995. He played a central role in strengthening tourism through historic preservation, improvement of cultural assets, and institutional reform. He converted the bureau from a county agency into an independent nonprofit organization, enabling it to respond more quickly in the marketplace.

Traub championed the rehabilitation of a long-vacant Cape Fear and Yadkin Valley Railway Depot in downtown for reuse as a museum and visitor center. The project, which followed decades of unsuccessful redevelopment efforts, received broad support from local and regional institutions.` He later authored grant applications to construct the first phase of the Cape Fear River Trail and, separately, fund a museum within the rehabilitated railway terminal. The restored 1890 depot now houses the Fayetteville History Museum.

=== Huntington Beach, California ===
Traub was selected as president and chief executive officer of the Huntington Beach Conference & Visitors Bureau (now Visit Huntington Beach) in 2001. Early in his tenure, he addressed financial control issues within the organization and implemented revised financial policies and oversight procedures. A business improvement district was also established to promote the city as an overnight destination.

Under Traub’s leadership, the bureau advanced a comprehensive destination marketing strategy centered on promoting Surf City USA as Huntington Beach’s defining brand identity. The effort included securing federal trademark registration for the Surf City USA name, developing licensed brand extensions, launching a new tourism website, and implementing visitor-facing infrastructure such as a staffed visitor information kiosk at the base of the Huntington Beach Pier.

The branding initiative gave rise to a multi-year legal dispute with Santa Cruz, California, over ownership of the Surf City USA trademark. The controversy drew extensive regional, national, and international media coverage, including reporting by The Washington Post, the Los Angeles Times, NPR, and international outlets such as The Guardian. In a front-page story, The Wall Street Journal described the branding campaign as Traub’s “brainchild.”

As the brand evolved beyond trademark registration, Surf City USA was incorporated into licensed merchandise, civic programming, and major events. Coverage at the conclusion of Traub’s tenure credited him with helping establish the Surf City USA brand, prevailing in the trademark dispute with Santa Cruz, and strengthening bureau operations during a period in which visitor spending reached record levels.

=== Lake Havasu City, Arizona ===
In 2010, Traub was named President and Chief Executive Officer of the Lake Havasu City Convention & Visitors Bureau (now Go Lake Havasu). During his tenure, he led a comprehensive destination-branding initiative based on structured research and consultation with residents, visitors, and community stakeholders to define and encapsulate the city’s identity and long-term positioning.

He also spearheaded the development of a citywide wayfinding program, establishing a coordinated framework for gateway and directional signage that incorporated the city’s brand positioning and official logo, including placements along State Route 95—the first wayfinding signs permitted on an Arizona state highway.

In 2014, Traub challenged a false report by the British tabloid The Sun concerning the London Bridge in Lake Havasu City; the dispute received international coverage and, following a formal retraction, generated further reporting. During this period, he also served as a national media spokesperson on tourism and the visitor economy, emphasizing digital platforms during high-impact seasonal events and pursuing creative tourism initiatives that drew national coverage.

During Traub’s tenure as president and CEO of the Lake Havasu City Convention and Visitors Bureau, the city advanced to the top 50 in Frontier Communications’ national America’s Best Communities competition—an initiative involving nearly 138 teams representing more than 350 U.S. communities—and later received a $2 million second-place award.

=== Pasco County, Florida ===
In 2017, Traub was appointed as Pasco County’s first tourism director, a position created to oversee long-range destination strategy.

== Personal life ==
Traub is an Eagle Scout. He has served as a consumer representative on the Pasco County Construction Board since 2023.
