= Meeting and convention planner =

A meeting and convention planner supervises and coordinates the strategic, operational, and logistical activities necessary for the production of events. The planner can be employed or hired ad hoc by corporations, associations, governments, and other organizations.

== Standardization issues ==
- Although the Occupational Information Network (O*NET), sponsored by the United States Department of Labor and Employment and Training Administration, identified this occupation as "meeting and convention planner," other titles are more commonly used. These titles include event planner, meeting planner, and meeting manager. In addition, several other titles specific to the categories of events produced are used, such as corporate planner and party planner.
- The banquet event order (BEO), a standard form used in the hospitality industry to document the requirements of an event as pertinent to the venue, has presented numerous problems to meeting and convention planners due to the increasing complexity and scope of modern events. In response, Convention Industry Council developed the event specifications guide (ESG) that is currently replacing the BEO.
- Additionally, the Convention Industry Council is spearheading The Accepted Practices Exchange (APEX). By bringing the planners and suppliers together to create industry-wide accepted practices and a common terminology, the profession continues to enhance the professionalism of the meetings, conventions and exhibitions industry.

== Certification and Designations ==
Planners can, but need not, be certified or hold designations.

=== Programs ===
Certification/Designation	Acronym	Issuing Organization
Certified Association Executive	CAE	American Society of Association Executives
Certified Destination Management Executive	CDME	International Association of Convention and Visitors Bureaus^{[usurped]}
Certified in Exhibition Management	CEM	International Association for Exhibition Management
Certified Event Rental Professional	CERP	American Rental Association
Certified Festival Executive	CFE	International Festivals and Events Association
Certified Hospitality Marketing Executive	CHME	Hospitality Sales and Marketing Association International
Certified Incentive Travel Executive	CITE	Society of Incentive and Travel Executives
Certified Meeting Professional	CMP	Convention Industry Council
Certificate in Meeting Management	CMM	Meeting Professionals International & Global Business Travel Association
Certified Professional Catering Executive	CPCE	National Association of Catering Executives
Certified Special Events Professional	CSEP	International Special Events Society
Destination Management Certified Professional	DMCP	Association of Destination Management Executives
Professional Bridal Consultant	PBC	Association of Bridal Consultants

== See also ==
- Professional Congress Organiser
- Event planning
- Event Planning and Production
- Event management
