= Atlantic and Yadkin Railway =

Short line railroad in North Carolina, U.S. (1899-1950)

Overview
- Locale: North Carolina
- Dates of operation: 1899–1950

Technical
- Track gauge: 4 ft 8 1/2 in (1,435 mm)

The Atlantic and Yadkin Railway was a short line railroad within North Carolina from 1899 to 1950. It ran from Mount Airy southeast to Sanford, primarily serving the Piedmont region. Some of the rails are still in use as of 2006 as parts of the Yadkin Valley Railroad.

== History ==
This railroad's short lifespan covered 1899 to 1950, but some of its rails were laid down in the 19th century as part of the Cape Fear and Yadkin Valley Railway (CF&YV) which ran from the Atlantic port of Wilmington, North Carolina, all the way to Mount Airy with a significant branch to Bennettsville, South Carolina.

The Atlantic and Yadkin Railway came into being when representatives of the Wilmington and Weldon Railroad (soon to be reorganized as the Atlantic Coast Line Railroad) outbid the Southern Railway for the debt-ridden and bankrupt CF&YV in an 1899 auction. The Wilmington & Weldon Railroad (W&W) had a clause in its incorporation that required any railroad purchased by the W&W to be placed under the same corporate name. The W&W did not want to own the whole of the CF&YV, only that portion which competed directly with its own lines in southeast North Carolina. So the CF&YV was sold to the Southern Railway, where it was reorganized as a new company under the name Atlantic and Yadkin Railway (A&Y). The newly created A&Y then sold back the southern half of its lines from Sanford to Wilmington to the W&W. The northern half remained a wholly owned subsidiary of the Southern Railway.

The questionable legality of the transaction regarding the split of the CF&YV meant years of legal wrangling by angry investors and interested state citizens who saw the only "trunk" line from the western mountains to a North Carolina port split between two competitors. In 1924, the North Carolina Supreme Court ruled that the sale and reorganization was legal. The Southern Railway wholly owned the A&Y, but kept it as an independent entity throughout the legal battles. The line was considered part of the Southern Railway until 1917, when the A&Y was allowed to run under its own name.

In 1924, the A&Y declared bankruptcy and was taken over by receivers. Receivership required a division of assets and separate operations from the Southern Railway. Eventually, the A&Y was returned to solvency.

The renewed profitability combined with the due date for the A&Y's $1.5 million in bonds in the late 1940s led the Southern Railway management to decide to merge the line into its own Winston-Salem Division. The Southern Railway paid the bonds and initiated a merger request. Despite some reservations by the merchants of Greensboro regarding lack of competition for rail transport in that growing city, the Interstate Commerce Commission approved the merger effective January 1, 1950. At that time, the Atlantic & Yadkin Railway company ceased to exist.

A 7.5 mile paved asphalt rail trail, the Atlantic & Yadkin Greenway, runs along the abandoned rail bed through Greensboro.
