= Atlantic and Western Railroad =

Atlantic and Western Railroad may refer to:

- Atlantic and Western Railroad (Florida), 1888–1896, predecessor of the Florida East Coast Railway
- Atlantic and Western Railroad (North Carolina), now the Atlantic and Western Railway
- Atlantic and Great Western Railroad
- Western and Atlantic Railroad
