= Howard W. Mattson =

American executive

Third Executive of Institute of Food Technologists
- In office 1987 – 1991 (retired)

Personal details
- Born: May 15, 1927 Duluth, Minnesota, USA
- Died: May 21, 1998 (71) Asheville, North Carolina
- Education: University of Michigan
- Occupation: Public Relations, chemist, writer, magazine editor

Howard W. Mattson (May 15, 1927 – May 21, 1998) was the third Executive Vice President of the Institute of Food Technologists (IFT), serving in that capacity from 1987 until his 1991 retirement. Prior to that, he had served in public relations and later became an advocate of organ transplant after his 1991 IFT retirement.

== Early life and career ==
A native of Duluth, Minnesota, Mattson earned his B.S. in 1949 at the University of Michigan. After graduation, he worked as a chemist for Allied Chemical Company, then he shifted his focus to public relations.

== Public relations prior to IFT ==
Mattson first started his career in public relations as an assistant advertising manager for the Bristol Company, then went to work for Bell Telephone Laboratories as editor and technical information supervisor. After his work at Bell, Mattson worked as an associate editor for International Science and Technology and then worked as director of corporate public relations for Monsanto Company in St. Louis, Missouri. Mattson would remain with Monsanto until 1973 when he joined IFT.

== IFT service ==
Hired by Executive Director Calvert L. Willey in 1973, Mattson would be named as Director of Public Information (called Vice President of Communications as of 2006). Upon Willey's retirement in 1987, Mattson would be promoted to executive director. He would hold that position until the 1991 Annual Meeting in Dallas, Texas, when he suffered a heart attack. The attack would force Mattson to retire and undergo a heart transplant.

== Retirement and post-IFT service ==
Mattson would retire to Flat Rock, North Carolina (between Asheville, North Carolina, and Greenville, South Carolina) where he joined Pinecrest Associate Reformed Presbyterian Church (ARP). During his time, Mattson became an accomplished photographer, even having a photo of his make the cover of the ARP Magazine in November 1996. One of his fellow churchgoers at Pinecrest was Buffalo Bob Smith of Howdy Doody television fame in the 1950s. He also remained involved with IFT by volunteering in an organ donor program and was seen at the IFT Annual Meeting from 1992 to 1997.

== Death ==
Mattson died in Asheville, North Carolina, on May 21, 1998, of a heart attack following battles with pneumonia and lung infections. A memorial service was held in Flat Rock on June 6, 1998.
