= Professional Convention Management Association =

Professional organization

- Professional Convention Management Association
- Organization logo
- Formation: 1956; 70 years ago
- Type: 501(c)(6) Nonprofit
- Tax ID no.: 36-2597526
- Headquarters: Chicago, Illinois
- CEO and President: Sherrif Karamat
- Chief Business Officer: Tusialofa Tauvaa
- Chief Operating Officer: Bruce Macmillan
- Revenue: $18.6M USD (2023)
- Expenses: $19.1M USD (2023)
- Website: www.pcma.org

PCMA, or Professional Convention Management Association, is a professional organization, representing management of business events, conferences and conventions. Their mission is to drive social and economic progress through the business events they host. It has more than 8,400 members, and branches in 37 countries located in North America, Europe, Asia, the Middle East, Australia and New Zealand.

PCMA was founded in 1956 in Philadelphia, Pennsylvania. In 2000, PCMA relocated from Birmingham, Alabama to its current headquarters in Chicago, Illinois.

The organization's Education Foundation provides scholarship and supports research. In 1986, it began printing its monthly magazine, known as Convene. PCMA's Digital Experience Institute provides live stream and digital events.

PCMA has an annual conference called "Convening Leaders" and also operates smaller conferences, such as the "Education Conference" and "Knowledge Exchange".

== See also ==
- Event management
- Meeting and convention planner
- Professional conference organiser
