= Calvert L. Willey Award =

The Calvert L. Willey Award has been awarded every year since 1989. It is awarded to a member of the Institute of Food Technologists (IFT) who displayed meritorious and imaginative service to IFT. The award is named for Calvert L. Willey (1920-1994) who served as Executive Secretary and later Executive Director from 1961 until his retirement in 1987. Willey was given a distinguished service award by IFT at the 1987 Annual Meeting in Las Vegas, Nevada. This distinguished service award would be named in his honor and presented for the first time as an annual award at the 1989 Annual Meeting in Chicago, Illinois. It was the first IFT Award to be named for a living person.

Award winners receive an USD 3000 honorarium and a plaque from IFT.

== Winners ==
Year	Winner
1987	Calvert L. Willey
1989	Ben F. Buchanan
1990	Aaron E. Wasserman
1991	Elwood F. Caldwell
1992	Miguel Jimenez
1993	Alan J. Post
1994	André Bolaffi
1995	Charles A. Becker
1996	Gale R. Ammerman
1997	Walter R. Clark
1998	Charles J. Bates
1999	Isabel D. Wolf
2000	Dee M. Graham
2001	Daniel E. Weber
2002	Elizabeth Larmond
2003	Francis F. Busta
2004	Charles H. Manley
2005	Bruce R. Stillings
2006	Pamela D. Tom
2007	William D. Davidson
2008	Neil H. Mermelstein
2009	Mary K. Wagner
2010	Margaret Lawson
