= Certified Meeting Professional =

Founded in 1985 by the Events Industry Council (formerly known as the Convention Industry Council), Certified Meeting Professional (CMP) is a certification for event professionals. In order to acquire a CMP certification, an individual must complete the CMP application to demonstrate their eligibility and then successfully pass a written exam covering meeting management. As of May 2018, more than 11,000 meeting professionals in over 55 countries around the world have earned the CMP certification.

== Eligibility ==
Applying for the CMP certification program is a two-step process. First, applicants must apply to be an Events Industry Council Member, then they must pass a written exam about meeting management.
