= Professional conference organiser =

Company specializing in planning and managing conferences and events

A professional conference organiser, professional congress organiser (PCO) or conference company specialises in organising and managing congresses, conferences, seminars and similar events.

== Role ==
PCOs can typically work as consultants for academic and professional associations. They usually provide complete service management for conferences, including conference design, abstract management software, program development, registration, site and venue selection and booking, audiovisuals, IT support, logistics, leisure management, marketing, printing and web services, sourcing speakers, funding, sponsorship and exhibitor sales, financial management and budget control.

Other companies offer related services, including travel agents and public relations companies. They tend to focus on limited areas such as destination management.

== Size of market sector ==
Surveys of UK conference venues have found that PCOs or venue-finding agencies made a third of conference bookings. In 2006, UK-based conferences generated £7.6 billion in direct sales, giving PCOs a central role in generating some £2.5 billion in revenue. The UK is ranked second behind the US for global market share of conferences. Thus, although there is no one source of global statistics for the conference market, PCOs are central to several billion dollars' worth of revenue generation worldwide.

== See also ==
- Event planning
- Meeting and convention planner
- Meetings, incentives, conferencing, exhibitions
