= BIT Life Sciences =

Chinese company

- Industry: Scientific meetings
- Founded: 2003
- Headquarters: Dalian Hi-Tech Zone, China
- Owner: Xiaodan Mei
- Website: www.bitlifesciences.com

BIT Life Sciences (or BIT Congress Inc., BIT Group Global Ltd) is a for profit meetings, incentives, conferencing, exhibitions (MICE) company based in Dalian, China, that specializes in arranging multiple scientific congresses that have been described as "predatory". The company is part of a wave of organizations that have appeared in China in the past several years noted for arranging congresses with little academic merit and with the primary aim of generating revenue rather than scientific knowledge sharing. Papers submitted are usually accepted without revisions within 24 hours, and BIT has frequently been spoofed (see this example: http://witchdoctor.ca/?p=892).

== Business model ==
The business model of this company usually involves sending unsolicited bulk email (spam) to invite attendees and speakers, at the same time, registration fee will be provided based on different levels of speakers in relevant fields. Unlike traditional model of scientific congresses in which abstracts are usually submitted and peer reviewed before being accepted for presentation, speakers are guaranteed a speaking role as long as the attendance fees are paid.
