= Event scheduling =

Event scheduling is the activity of finding a suitable time for an event such as meetings, conferences, trips, etc. It is an important part of event planning that is usually carried out at its beginning stage.

In general, event scheduling must take into account what impact particular dates of the event could have on the success of the event. When organizing a scientific conference, for example, organizers might take into account the periods in which classes are held at universities, since it is expected that many potential participants are university professors. They should also try to check, that no other similar conferences are held at the same time, because overlapping would make a problem for those participants who are interested in attending all conferences.

When it is well known who is expected to attend the event (e.g. in the case of a project meeting), organizers usually try to synchronize the time of the event with planned schedules of all participants. This is a difficult task when there are many participants or when the participants are located at distant places. In such cases, the organizers should first define a set of suggested dates and address a query about suitable dates to potential participants. After response is obtained from all participants, the event time suitable for most of the participants is selected. This procedure can be alleviated by internet tools.

== See also ==
- Event planning
