= Western Railroad (North Carolina) =

The Western Railroad was a railroad in North Carolina connecting Fayetteville to the coal fields of Egypt (now Cumnock).

A group of Fayetteville citizens obtained a charter from the North Carolina legislature in December 1852 to construct a railroad from Fayetteville to the coal fields of Chatham County (now Chatham, Moore, and Lee counties). The state helped finance, build, and operate the new railroad. Problems with the construction contracts and obtaining rights of way delayed its construction, the first rails being laid in 1858. It was not completed until the first part of the American Civil War. Its first operations in commenced in 1861 to McIver's Depot, and the line was completed to Egypt in 1863.

Charles Beatty Mallett (1816-1872) served as the railroad's second president from 1855 to 1865, and fourth president from 1867 to 1868. He was the son of Charles Peter Mallett (1792-c1874). Mallett was a cotton manufacturer, acquiring a controlling interest in the Union Manufacturing Company during the time he served as the railroad's president. In 1862 Mallett, in partnership with James Browne of Charleston, South Carolina, took over management and operation of the Egypt Coal Mines. These mines had been owned by a Philadelphia-based company, and had been placed into receivership by the Confederate government at the start of the war. The facilities of the railroad were used to transport the coal to Fayetteville, where it was then moved down the Cape Fear River to its contracted final destination of Wilmington, North Carolina. In 1865 Gen. Sherman's army reached Fayetteville. During his campaign Sherman burned or destroyed several of the bridges used by the railroad, 12 miles of track, and several depots. Its rolling stock was saved, having been moved to the Egypt end of the line. By 1868, his other businesses and personal residence also destroyed by Sherman's campaign, Mallett was forced into bankruptcy.

The line resumed operations in 1868. In the following two years, additional connections were made to the railroad, and it continued operations for another 11 years. In 1879 the railroad was renamed Cape Fear and Yadkin Valley Railway and absorbed the Mount Airy Railroad.
