= Poster session =

Form of academic conference

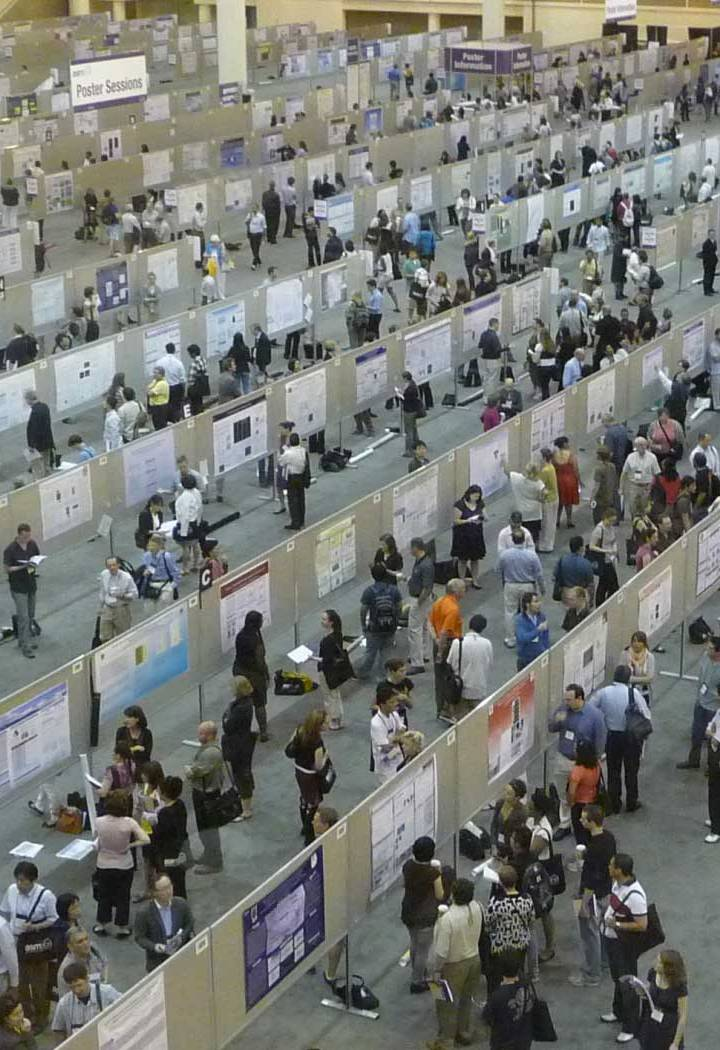
Poster session at the 111th American Society for Microbiology General Meeting, New Orleans, LA.

A poster presentation, at a congress or conference with an academic or professional focus, is the presentation of research information in the form of a paper poster that conference participants may view. A poster session is an event at which many such posters are presented. Poster sessions are particularly prominent at scientific conferences such as medical and engineering congresses.

== Academic conference ==
To participate in a poster session, an abstract is submitted to the academic or professional society for consideration and on occasion may include peer-reviewed material qualified for journal publication. Selected poster abstracts are then designated for oral presentation or poster presentation. Quite often, poster content is embargoed from release to the public until the commencement of the poster session. Typically a separate hall or area of a convention floor is reserved for the poster session where researchers accompany a paper poster, illustrating their research methods and outcomes. Each research project is usually presented on a conference schedule for a period ranging from 10 minutes to several hours. Very large events may feature thousands of poster presentations over a number of days.

Presentations usually consist of affixing the research poster to a portable board with the researcher in attendance answering questions posed by passing colleagues. The poster boards are often 4 by 6 feet (1.2 m × 1.8 m) or 4 by 8 feet (1.2 m × 2.4 m) and the size of the poster itself varies according to whether the conference organizers decide to have one, two, or more posters on each board face. Posters are often created using a presentation program such as PowerPoint and may be printed on a large format printer. Glossy paper, matte paper (with or without gloss or matte lamination), satin paper, vinyl, and printable fabric are common substrates for poster presentations.

On occasion, poster sessions are displayed digitally on large monitors and this allows for features such as embedded videos, narrations and external links.

Collections of digital posters can successfully be viewed on desktop monitors with sufficient resolution and pixel density. This provides a means for academic and professional societies to create digital archives of current and past poster sessions.

Organizers of digital poster sessions are challenged with managing the logistics of presenting hundreds, if not thousands, of posters on a limited number of monitors. With the traditional printed poster session, attendees can spend as much, or as little, time at each poster depending on interest, and the posters are continuously on display. They can interact with authors and discuss the research without time constraints. With a digital poster session, presentations are usually timed, with a limited amount of exposure, and follow a set schedule.

== Academic assessment ==
Poster sessions are used as an alternative to oral presentations as a form of academic assessment.

== See also ==
- Abstract management
- Academic conference
