= Rural Hall station =

- Rural Hall Depot
- U.S. National Register of Historic Places
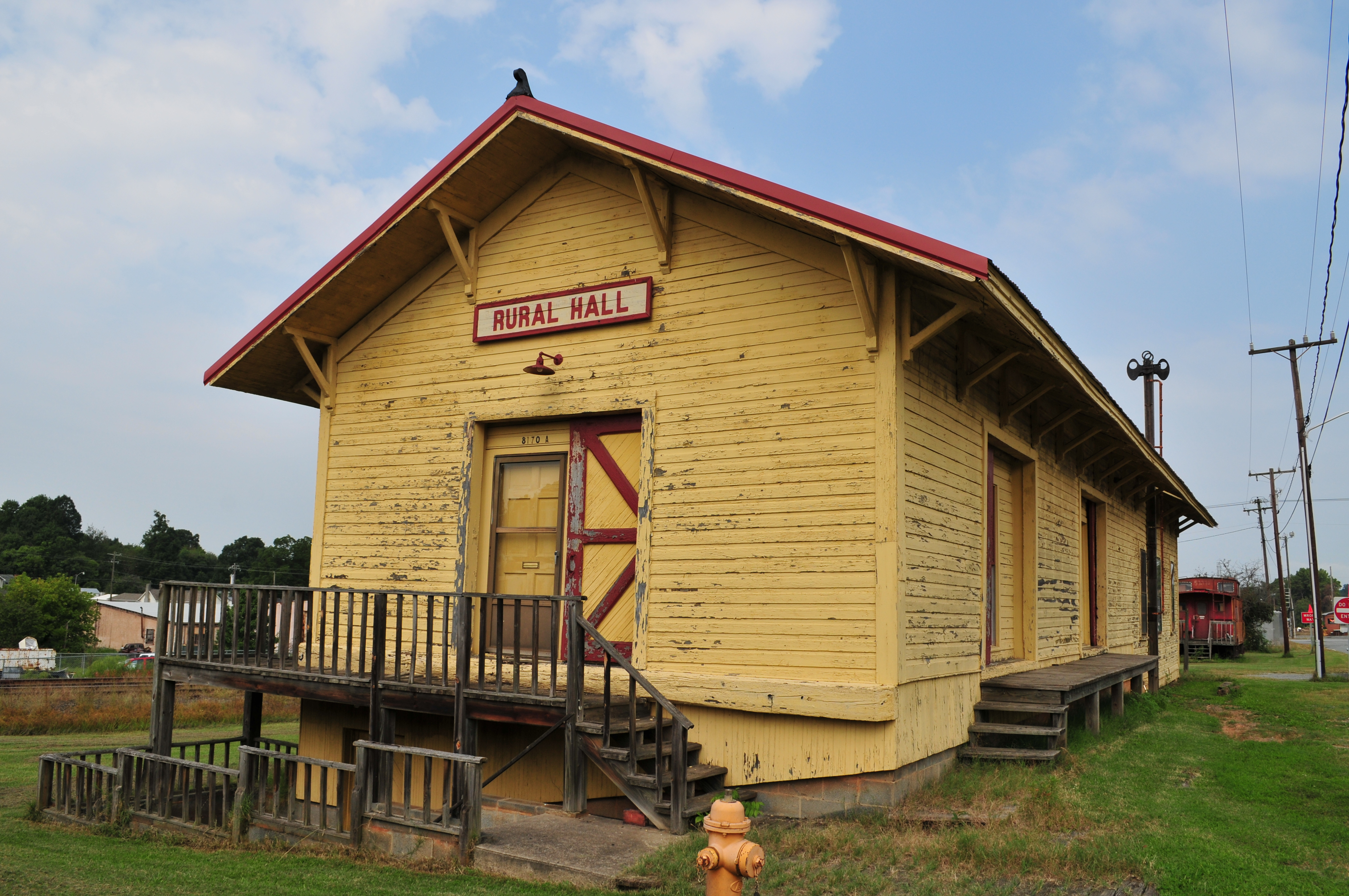
- Rural Hall Depot, August 2013

- Location within North Carolina Location within the United States
- Location: Depot St. (SR 1646), Rural Hall, North Carolina
- Coordinates: 36°14′36″N 80°17′51″W
- Area: less than one acre
- Built: 1907
- NRHP reference No.: 83001881
- Added to NRHP: July 21, 1983

Rural Hall Depot is a historic train station located at Rural Hall, Forsyth County, North Carolina. It was built in 1907 for the Southern Railway. It is a one-story rectangular frame building sheathed in German siding. It measures 23 feet wide and 78 feet long. The interior consists of waiting rooms for white and "colored" passengers and a station master's office. Passenger service ceased in 1955, but the depot continued to provide services and facilities to freight trains until its closing in 1980. The building was moved to its present site in March 1980, and serves as a local railroad museum.

It was listed on the National Register of Historic Places in 1983.

Preceding station	Atlantic Coast Line Railroad	Following station
King toward Mount Airy	Sanford Branch	Germanton toward Wilmington
