= Endor Iron Furnace =

- U.S. National Register of Historic Places
- Location within North Carolina Location within the United States
- Location: SE of Cumnock, near Cumnock, North Carolina
- Coordinates: 35°33′0.63″N 79°13′28.1″W
- Area: 9 acres (3.6 ha)
- Built: 1862-1864
- NRHP reference No.: 74001358
- Added to NRHP: August 13, 1974

The Endor Iron Furnace was an iron furnace that operated from 1861–1864 and again from 1870–1871, near Cumnock, Lee County, North Carolina. It was constructed between 1862 and 1864 to take advantage of the iron deposits along the Deep River. The furnace is constructed of soft local reddish-gray stones and measures approximately 32 feet square at the base and rises to a height of about 35 feet. During the American Civil War, the furnace produced pig iron for the Confederate Army.

It was listed on the National Register of Historic Places in 1974.

In 2001, the property was acquired by the Triangle Land Conservancy.
