= Atlantic and Western Railway =

Class III railroad in North Carolina

Overview
- Headquarters: Jacksonville, Florida
- Reporting mark: ATW
- Locale: North Carolina
- Dates of operation: 1896–present

Technical
- Track gauge: 4 ft 8 1/2 in (1,435 mm) standard gauge
- Length: 9 miles

The Atlantic and Western Railway (reporting mark ATW) is a Class III short-line railroad operating about 9 miles (14 km) of track in Lee County, North Carolina. Atlantic and Western is part of Genesee & Wyoming Inc. and formerly part of Rail Management and Consulting. It was reorganized in 1927 from the Atlantic and Western Railroad.

== History ==
Originally the A&W ran between Sanford and Lillington, 25 miles. In 1961, the line was abandoned except for 3 miles from Sanford eastward. In the 1970s, the ATW's fleet of modernized 40-foot boxcars in food lading service were some of the last 40-foot boxcars in revenue service in the United States. The railroad company was reorganized in 1988, following its sale to Rail Management Corporation.

In 2001 the A&W began operating between Sanford and Cumnock over a line that was originally a segment of the Cape Fear and Yadkin Valley Railway and subsequently Southern Railway and Norfolk Southern. The railway was sold in 2005 to the Gennessee and Wyoming Corporation. In 2011, Norfolk Southern granted the A&W additional rights to serve customers between Cumnock and Brickhaven over the original Norfolk Southern Railway.

== Interchanges ==
- Sanford, North Carolina
  - CSX Transportation (CSXT)
  - Norfolk Southern (NS)
