= Fayetteville station (Cape Fear and Yadkin Valley Railway) =

Historic train station in North Carolina, US

- Cape Fear and Yadkin Valley Railway Passenger Depot
- U.S. National Register of Historic Places
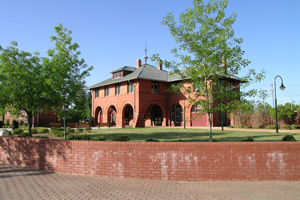
- Cape Fear and Yadkin Valley Railway Passenger Depot, May 2006

- Location within North Carolina Location within the United States
- Location: 148 Maxwell St., Fayetteville, North Carolina
- Coordinates: 35°3′8″N 78°52′56″W
- Area: less than one acre
- Built: 1890
- Architectural style: Romanesque
- MPS: Fayetteville MRA
- NRHP reference No.: 83001846
- Added to NRHP: July 7, 1983

Cape Fear and Yadkin Valley Railway Passenger Depot is a historic train station located at 325 Franklin Street in Fayetteville, North Carolina (Cumberland County). It was built in 1890 by the Cape Fear and Yadkin Valley Railway. It is a two-story brick passenger depot with a deep hip roof in the Romanesque Revival style. The seven bay by two bay building features a rounded brick arch arcade. It was listed on the National Register of Historic Places in 1983.

During the first ten years after its construction, when rails provided the primary means for long-distance transportation, the Depot served as a gateway into the Fayetteville area and a reflection of civic pride. It made a strong first impression on newcomers and presented a prosperous contrast to train stations constructed exclusively from wood that had been built in N.C. prior to that time. It operated as a passenger station until about 1900, but after the demise of the Cape Fear & Yadkin Valley Railway, passenger services were moved to a newer depot on the Fayetteville Cutoff.[2]

For the next 80 years, the Depot went through successive conversions to a grocery store, hardware store, automobile dealership and plumbing warehouse, to mention a few of its many identities. By 1980, as downtown experienced a period of deterioration due to shifts in population away from the city and relocation of major retail stores to suburban shopping districts, the building fell into disrepair. A group of local citizens interested in downtown revitalization and historic preservation convinced the city to use it as a Farmer’s Market. The city purchased the Depot in 1982, and acquired adjacent properties on the block thereafter. By 1985, the entire block had been assembled.

Unfortunately, however, attempts to establish a Farmer’s Market were not successful. Over the next 14 years, the Depot remained vacant and its deterioration continued. Several attempts were made by private investors to purchase the building and adapt it for commercial use, but strong lobbying pressure from local historic and arts groups enabled the structure to remain in public hands. Not until a plan to rehabilitate the facility as a Transportation Museum and Visitor Center was unveiled in 1999 by Doug Traub, President & CEO of the Fayetteville Area Convention & Visitors Bureau (now DistiNCtly Fayetteville), was a consensus achieved.

A nomination for Rehabilitation of the Cape Fear & Yadkin Valley Railway Passenger Depot, Phase I, was developed by Traub in concert with Mayor J.L. Dawkins, City Manager Roger Stancil and City Historian Bruce Dawes. Every concerned, relevant constituent group in the community threw its support behind the project. In rare votes of unanimous approval, local governmental officials pledged new, substantial matching funds for the project. The proposed project became the North Carolina Department of Transportation’s number one ranked Enhancement Project amongst 146 applications, and received a grant of $1.4 million in federal funds to restore the property. Working as a consultant, Traub wrote another grant in 2000 that received another $422,000 in federal funds to construct Phase II, a museum within the property.

Today the restored Depot it is a reminder of an age when North Carolina’s mineral, manufacturing and agricultural resources were first being rendered accessible to world markets by rail and sea, as well as a place to learn the history of Fayetteville.

== Fayetteville History Museum ==
The building now houses the Fayetteville History Museum, with displays about area transportation and local history, including a model train room and a recreated station agent's office. The adjacent annex building includes vintage cars; a recreated 1920s gas station; a vintage 1884 Silsby "Steam Pumper" fire engine that was pulled by a horse and used by the Fayetteville Fire Department as late as 1921; and exhibits on local law enforcement, the fire department, farm life, Fort Bragg and Pope Army Air Field.

| Preceding station | Atlantic Coast Line Railroad | Following station |
|---|---|---|
| Shaw toward Mount Airy | Sanford Branch until 1900 | Vander toward Wilmington |
| Hope Mills toward Charleston | Charleston – Fayetteville via Bennettsville until 1900 | Terminus |
