= Aaron E. Wasserman =

American food scientist (1920–2015)

- Born: October 11, 1920; Philadelphia, Pennsylvania
- Died: July 5, 2015 (aged 94); Philadelphia, Pennsylvania
- Awards: Calvert L. Willey Award
- Scientific career
- Fields: Food Science
- Workplaces: Merck and Company; ARS (USDA)

Aaron E. Wasserman (October 11, 1920 – July 5, 2015) was an American food scientist. He was the editor-in-chief of the Institute of Food Technologists' (IFT) Journal of Food Science (JFS) from 1981 to 1990.

== Biography ==
A Pennsylvania native, Wasserman earned his B.S. in 1942 from the University of the Sciences in Philadelphia. He then worked for Merck and Company, and later with the United States Department of Agriculture's (USDA) Agricultural Research Service (ARS) before his retirement in the late 1970s or early 1980s. During the same period Dr. Wasserman's Lab at USDA outside of Philadelphia pioneered the area of nitrosamine formation in cured meats.

Wasserman was named a fellow of the Institute of Food Technologists in 1979. Wasserman served as editor-in-chief of the Journal of Food Science from 1981 to 1990.

Aaron Wasserman retired to the Philadelphia area, and died of natural cause on 5 July 2015.

== Selected works ==
- Fiddler, Walter.; Parker, William Ernest.; Wasserman, Aaron E.; Doerr, Robert C. (1967). "Thermal decomposition of ferulic acid". Journal of Agricultural and Food Chemistry. 15 (5): 757–761. doi:10.1021/jf60153a003.
- Luddy, Francis E.; Herb, S. F.; Magidman, Paul; Spinelli, Marie; Wasserman, Aaron E. (1970). "Color and the lipid composition of pork muscles". Journal of the American Oil Chemists' Society. 47 (2): 65–68. doi:10.1007/BF02541460. PMID 5414597. S2CID 38985879.
- "From the Scientific Editor". Journal of Food Science. 46 (6): iv–vi. 1981. doi:10.1111/j.1365-2621.1981.tb04448.x.
- "From the Scientific Editor". Journal of Food Science. 54 (6): iv–vi. 1989. doi:10.1111/j.1365-2621.1989.tb05117.x.
- Wasserman, A.E. and J.W. Hampton. (1960). "Whey Utilization III. Oxygen Absorption Rates and the Growth of Saccharomyces fragillis in Several Propagators." Applied Microbiology. 8(5): 293-297.
- Wasserman, A.E. and W.J. Hopkins. (1958). "Dissimilation of C14-labeled Glucose by Serratia marcescens." Journal of Bacteriology. 75(4): 492-493.
- Wasserman, A. E. (1954). "Reversal of the Streptomycin Injury of Escherichia Coli". The Journal of General Physiology. 38 (2): 213–223. doi:10.1085/jgp.38.2.213. PMC 2147409. PMID 13211997.
- Wasserman, Aaron E.; Spinelli, Ann M. (1972). "Effect of some water-soluble components on aroma of heated adipose tissue". Journal of Agricultural and Food Chemistry. 20 (2): 171–174. doi:10.1021/jf60180a003.

== Awards ==
- 1990: Institute of Food Technologists' Calvert L. Willey Award for his service as editor of JFS
