= International Congress and Convention Association =

The International Congress and Convention Association (ICCA) was founded in 1963 by a group of travel agents to exchange information on international congresses and conventions.

Headquartered in Amsterdam, the Netherlands, the ICCA is a nonprofit trade organization whose primary purpose is to be the global community for the meetings industry, enabling its members to generate and maintain significant competitive advantage.

It has over 1,000 members in over 90 different countries. The members are divided by the type of the company into different sectors which include: destination marketing, meetings management, meetings support, transport, venues and honorary members. The member companies and organisations situated in the same geographical area are divided into chapters. The divided chapters include: African, Asia Pacific, Central European, France-BeneLux, Iberian, Latin American, Mediterranean, Middle East, North American, Scandinavian and UK/Ireland Chapter. The purpose of dividing the members into sectors and chapters is to enable networking between those members which have certain aspects in common in order to enhance their business activities in the industry.

The ICCA is a member of the following global organisations: Convention Industry Council (CIC), Joint Meetings Industry Council (JMIC), World Tourism Organization (UNWTO) and the Union of International Associations (UIA). The association now has an international network of suppliers which is in service for the international meetings industry.

== Sources ==
- https://web.archive.org/web/20110407024823/http://unwto.org/
- https://web.archive.org/web/20150403231915/http://www.cibtm.com/en/Exhibitors/51261/ICCA-International-Congress-Convention-Association
