= Conference app =

Digital tool that helps attendees and organizers manage events

A conference app, also known as an event app or meeting app, is a mobile app developed to help attendees and meeting planners manage their conference experience. It typically includes conference proceedings and venue information, allowing users to create personalized schedules and engage with other users. A conference app can be a native app or web-based. In recent years, conference apps have gained in popularity as a sustainable solution for event management by reducing the amount of paper used for printed materials.

== See also ==
- Comparison of web conferencing software
