= Yadkin Valley Railroad =

Railway line in North Carolina, United States

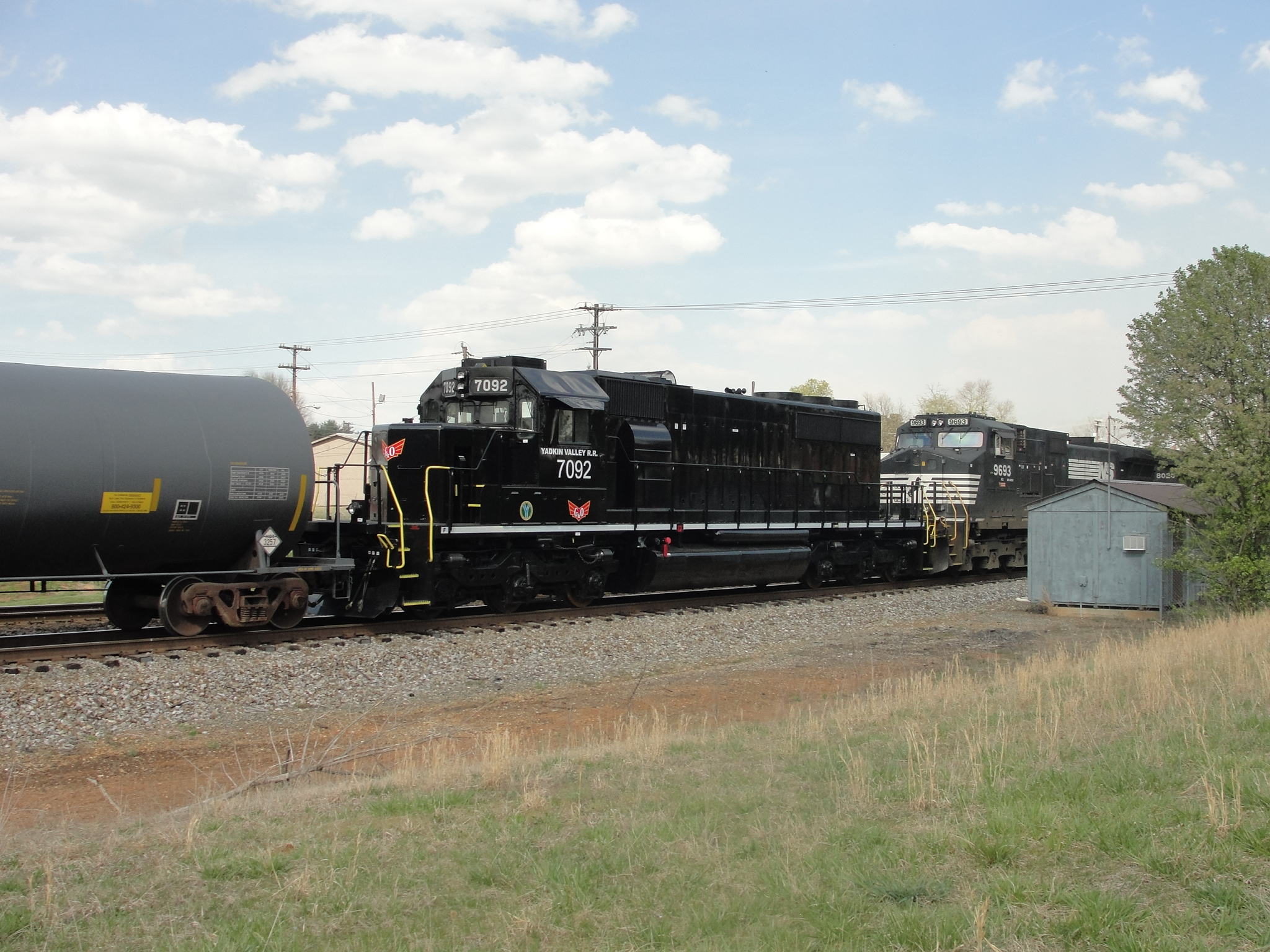
- YVRR 7092 in a fresh coat of paint getting delivered by NS to the YVRR

Overview
- Headquarters: Rural Hall, North Carolina
- Reporting mark: YVRR
- Locale: Northern North Carolina
- Dates of operation: 1989–present
- Predecessor: Norfolk Southern Railway

Technical
- Track gauge: 4 ft 8 1/2 in (1,435 mm) (standard gauge)
- Length: 93 miles (150 km)

The Yadkin Valley Railroad (reporting mark YVRR) is the trade name of the Piedmont and Atlantic Railroad and is a shortline railroad operating two lines leased from the Norfolk Southern Railway (Then purchased outright in 2009) originating out of Rural Hall, North Carolina for a distance of 93 miles (150 km). The railroad began operation in 1989 and is currently a subsidiary of Gulf and Ohio Railways.

Primary commodities include poultry feed ingredients, wood products, steel, plastics, propane, ethanol, and rail car storage, amounting to approximately 12,700 annual carloads.

== History ==
Two separate lines comprise the Yadkin Valley railroad, both originating out of Rural Hall. The first runs to North Wilkesboro and was completed by the North Western North Carolina Railroad on August 30, 1890, as part of the Richmond & Danville. The second line to Mount Airy was constructed by the Cape Fear & Yadkin Valley in June 1888. Both railroads were absorbed by the Southern prior to the turn of the century.

The Yadkin Valley railroad began operations December 11, 1989, as a subsidiary of the Laurinburg & Southern under Norfolk Southern's Thoroughbred Shortline Program. Interchange is made with Norfolk Southern at Rural Hall. Control of the railroad was turned over to Gulf & Ohio on March 1, 1994. Recently acquired trackage rights allow the railroad access to Winston-Salem.

As both lines were still leased from Norfolk Southern, the railroad sought to purchase both lines outright in 2009.

== See also ==
- Gulf and Ohio Railways
- HawkinsRails.net Yadkin Valley page
