= Academic conference =

Conference for researchers to present and discuss their work

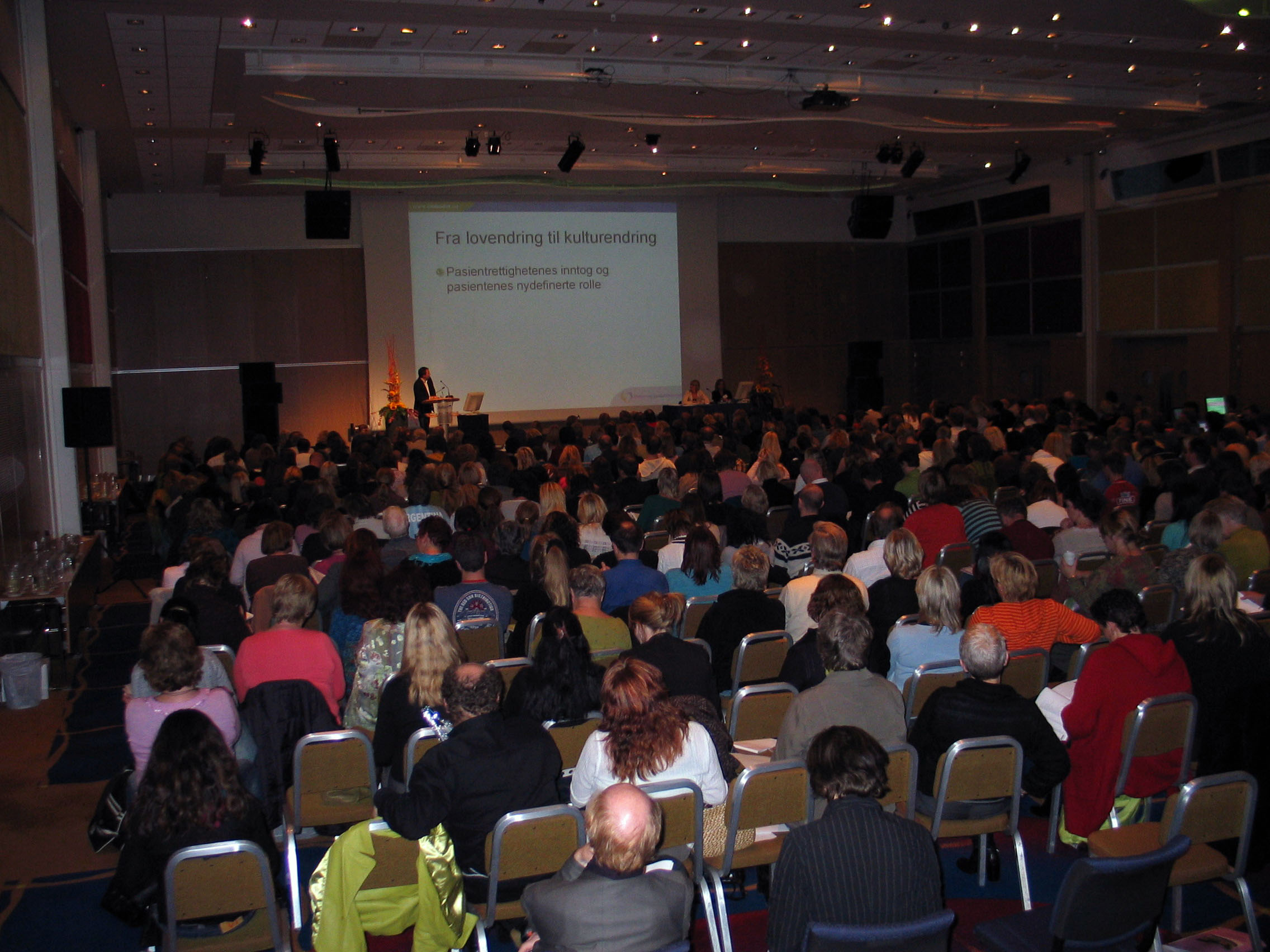
Conference on Opioid agonist therapy in Oslo, Norway

An academic or scientific conference (also called a congress, symposium, workshop, or meeting) is an event where researchers (not necessarily academics) present and discuss their scholarly work. Along with academic or scientific journals and preprint archives, conferences are an important channel for researchers to exchange information. Additional benefits include developing presentation skills, getting acquainted with the "academic habitus", receiving feedback from peers, exploring opportunities and collaborations, and learning about current research in one or more disciplines. The first international academic conferences and congresses appeared in the 19th century.

== Overview ==
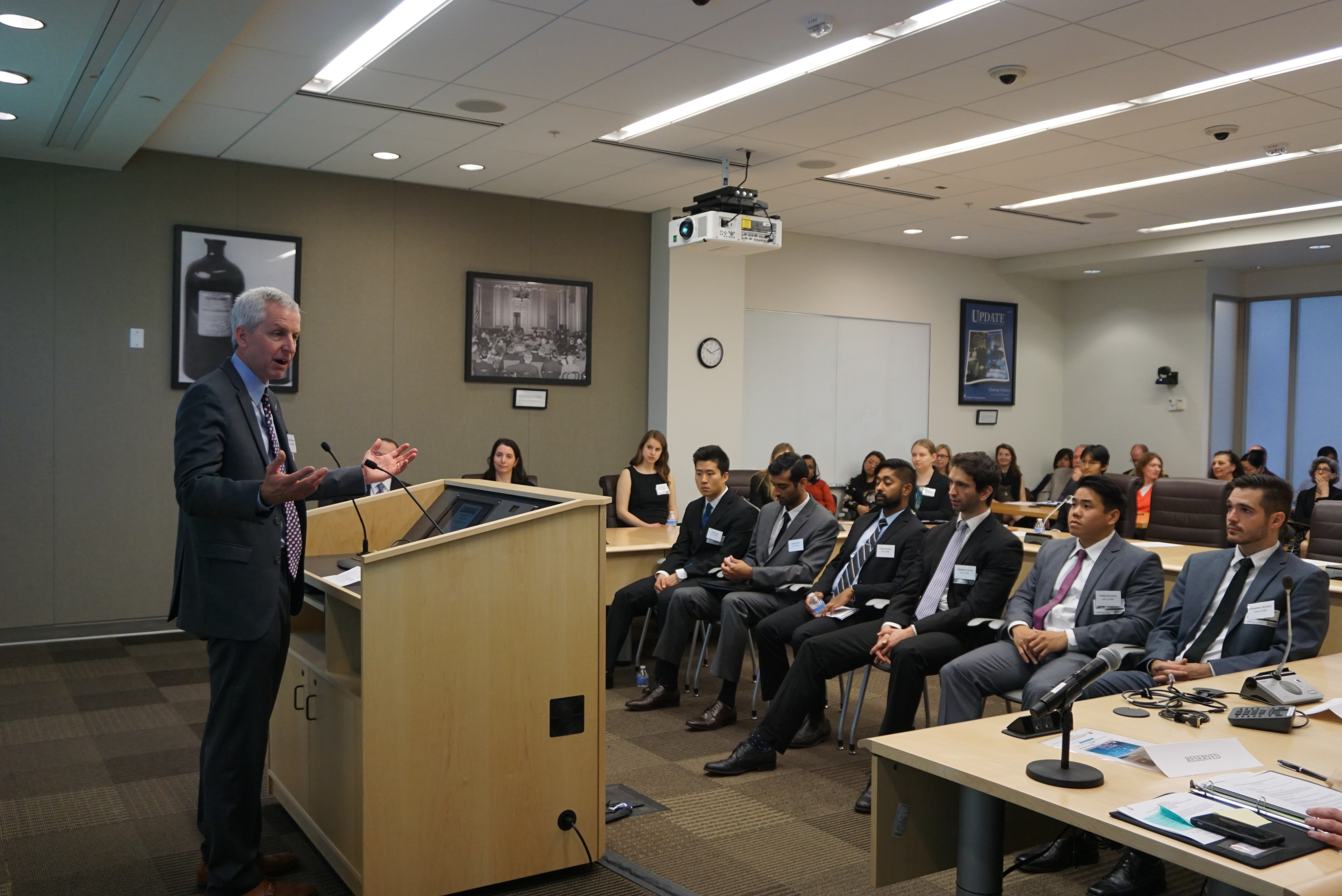
Presentations form the core of most conferences

Conferences usually encompass various presentations. They tend to be short and concise, with a time span of about 10 to 30 minutes; presentations are usually followed by a discussion. The work may be bundled in written form as academic papers and published as the conference proceedings.

Usually a conference will include keynote speakers (often, scholars of some standing, but sometimes individuals from outside academia). The keynote lecture is often longer, lasting sometimes up to an hour and a half, particularly if there are several keynote speakers on a panel.

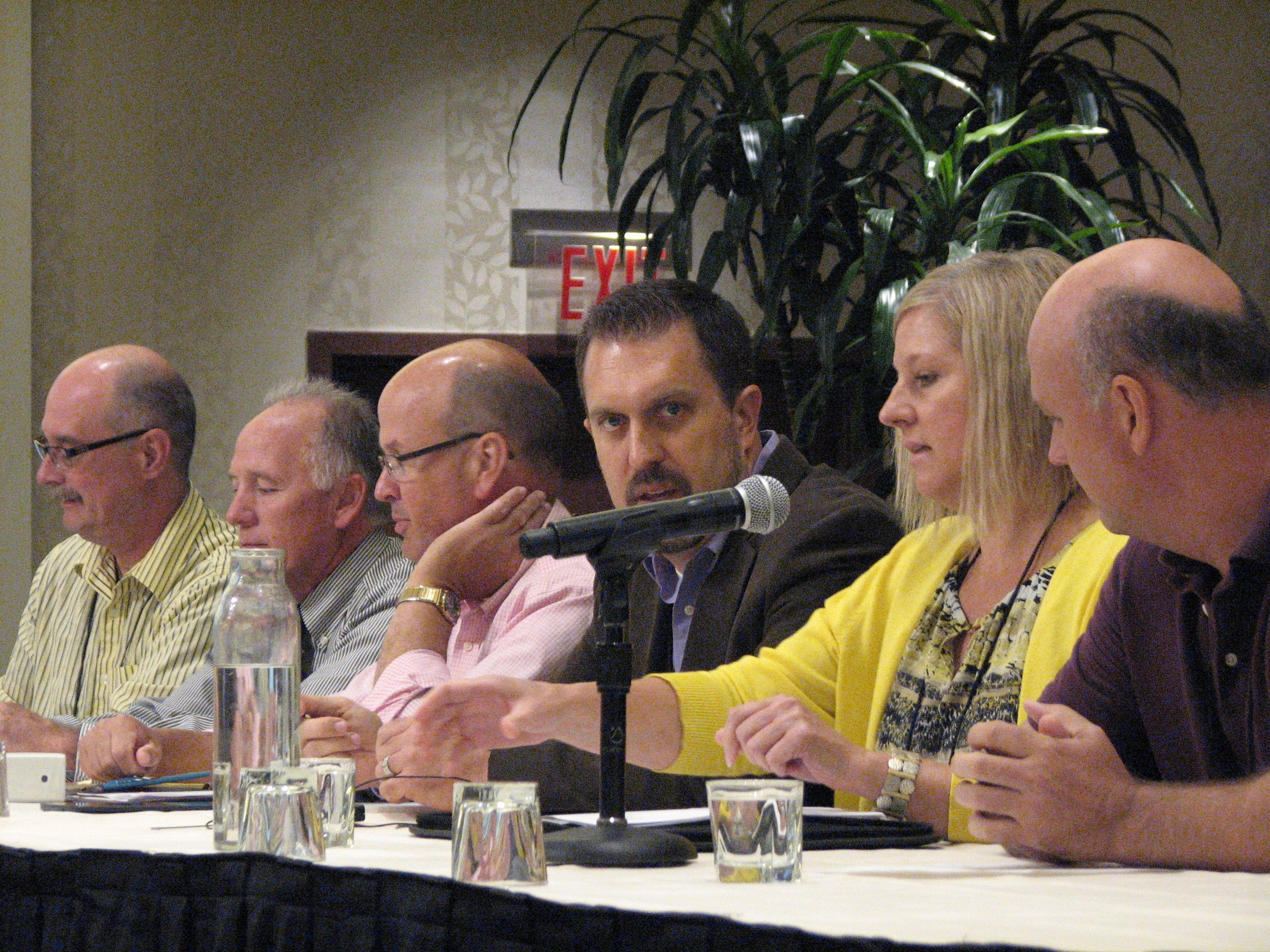
Panel discussions are intended to bring multiple perspectives on a topic.

In addition to presentations, conferences also feature panel discussions, round tables on various issues, poster sessions and workshops. Some conferences take more interactive formats, such as the participant driven "unconference" or various conversational formats.

=== Format ===
Academic conferences have been held in three general formats: in-person, virtual or online and hybrid (in-person and virtual). Conferences have traditionally been organized in-person. Since the COVID-19 pandemic many conferences have either temporarily or permanently switched to a virtual or hybrid format. Some virtual conferences involve both asynchronous and synchronous formats. For example, there is a mix of pre-recorded and live presentations.

Because virtual or hybrid events allow people from different time zones to participate simultaneously, some will have to participate during their night-time. Some virtual conferences try to mitigate this issue by alternating their schedule in a way so that everyone has the chance to participate at day time at least once.

=== Presentations ===
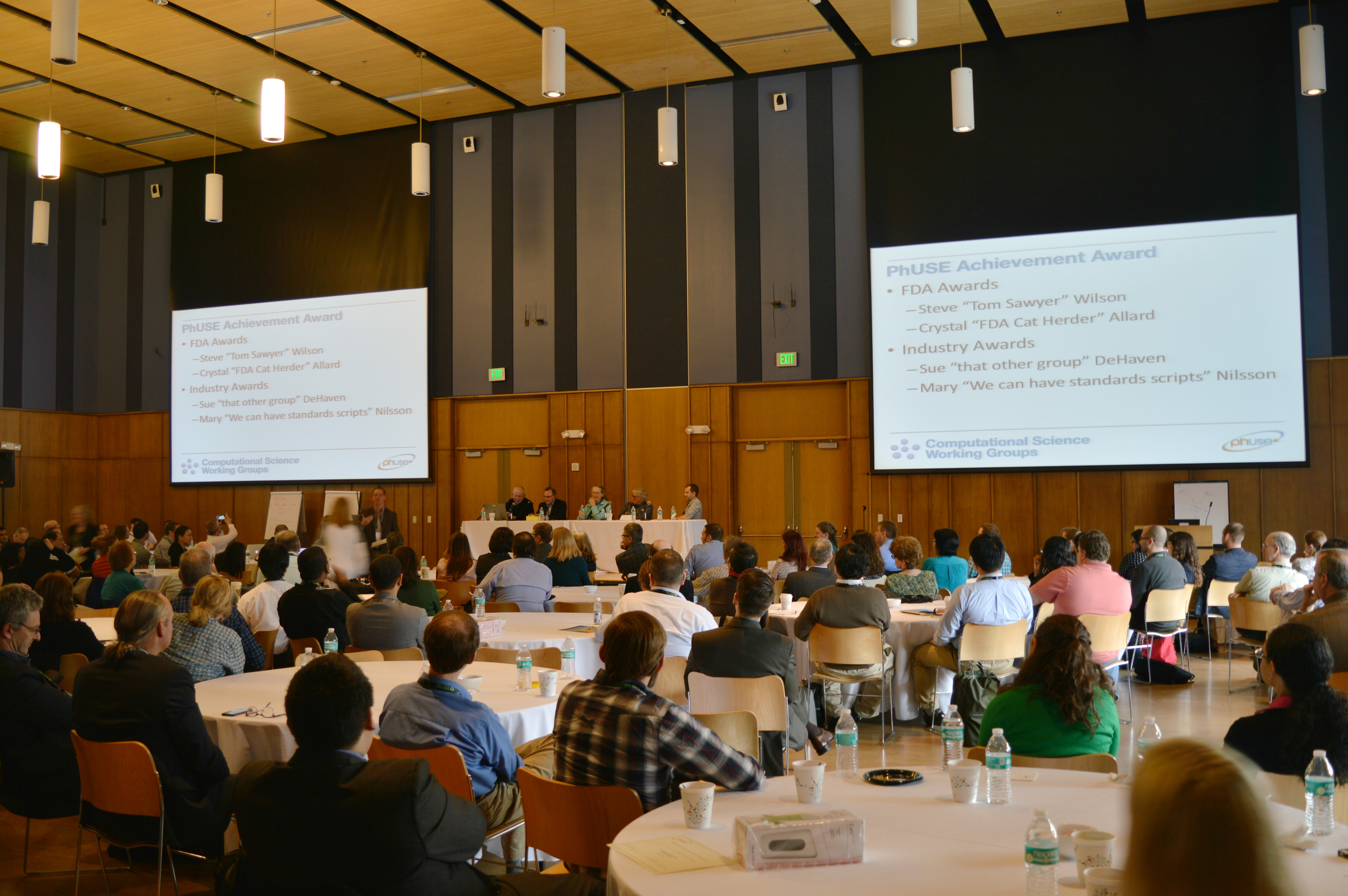
Presentations may be plenary sessions designed for all attendees (shown here) or breakout sections designed for smaller groups.

Prospective presenters are usually asked to submit a short abstract of their presentation, which will be reviewed before the presentation is accepted for the meeting. Some organizers, and therefore disciplines require presenters to submit a paper, which is peer reviewed by members of the program committee or referees chosen by them.

In some disciplines, such as English and other languages, it is common for presenters to read from a prepared script. In other disciplines such as the sciences, presenters usually base their talk around a visual presentation that displays key figures and research results.

=== Size ===
A large meeting will usually be called a conference, while a smaller is termed a workshop. They might be single track or multiple track, where the former has only one session at a time, while a multiple track meeting has several parallel sessions with speakers in separate rooms speaking at the same time. However, there are no commonly shared definitions even within disciplines for each event type. There might be no conceivable difference between a symposium, a congress or a conference.

The larger the conference, the more likely it is that academic publishing houses may set up displays. Large conferences also may have a career and job search and interview activities.

At some conferences, social or entertainment activities such as tours and receptions can be part of the program. Business meetings for learned societies, interest groups, or affinity groups can also be part of the conference activities.

=== Types ===
Academic conferences typically fall into three categories:

- the themed conference, small conferences organized around a particular topic;
- the general conference, a conference with a wider focus, with sessions on a wide variety of topics. These conferences are often organized by regional, national, or international learned societies, and held annually or on some other regular basis.
- the professional conference, large conferences not limited to academics but with academically related issues.

=== Infrastructure ===
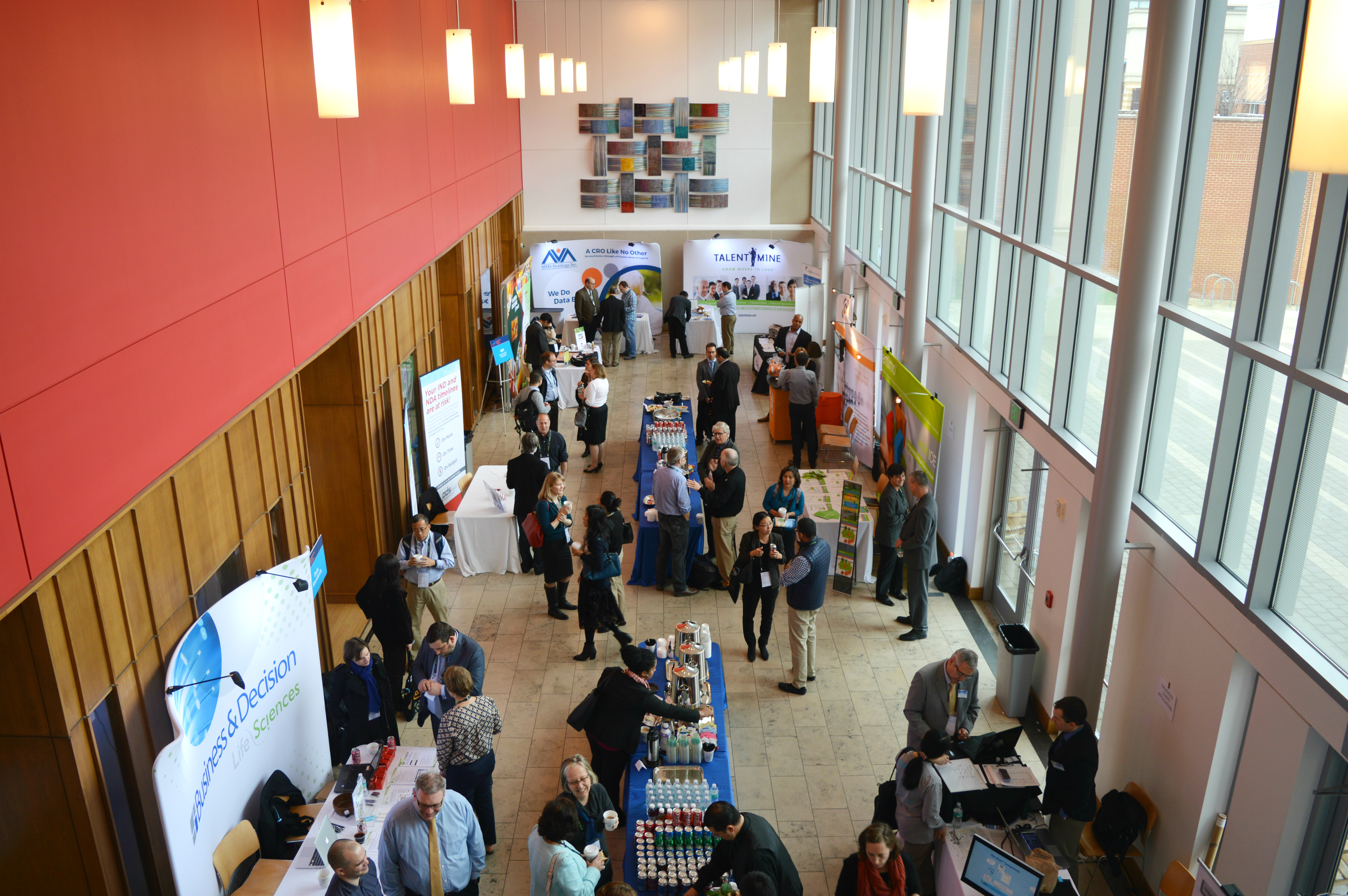
Larger conferences may have exhibits and displays for participants between sessions.

Increasing numbers of amplified conferences are being provided which exploit the potential of WiFi networks and mobile devices in order to enable remote participants to contribute to discussions and listen to ideas.

Advanced technology for meeting with any yet unknown person in a conference is performed by active RFID that may indicate willfully identified and relatively located upon approach via electronic tags.

== Organization ==
Conferences are usually organized either by a scientific society or by a group of researchers with a common interest. Larger meetings may be handled on behalf of the scientific society by a Professional Conference Organiser or PCO.

The meeting is announced by way of a Call For Papers (CFP) or a Call For Abstracts, which is sent to prospective presenters and explains how to submit their abstracts or papers. It describes the broad theme and lists the meeting's topics and formalities such as what kind of abstract or paper has to be submitted, to whom, and by what deadline. A CFP is usually distributed using a mailing list or on specialized online services such as Call for Papers (CFPs) Index. Contributions are usually submitted using an online abstract or paper management service such as Submit A Manuscript or Conference Submission system.

== Predatory conferences ==
Predatory conferences or predatory meetings are meetings set up to appear as legitimate scientific conferences but which are exploitative as they do not provide proper editorial control over presentations, and advertising can include claims of involvement of prominent academics who are, in fact, uninvolved. They are an expansion of the predatory publishing business model, which involves the creation of academic publications built around an exploitative business model that generally involves charging publication fees to authors without providing the editorial and publishing services associated with legitimate journals. BIT Life Sciences and SCIgen are some of the conferences labeled as predatory.

== Environmental impact ==
Academic conferences are criticized for being environmentally unfriendly, due to the amount of airplane traffic generated by them. A correspondence on Nature.com points out the "paradox of needing to fly to conferences" despite increased calls for sustainability by environmental scientists. The academic community's carbon footprint is comprised in large parts by emissions caused by air travel. Despite the existence of comprehensive guidelines, as of 2017, only a limited number of conferences had adopted practices aimed at reducing their environmental impact. An analysis of academic conferences held in 2016 revealed that only 4% of 116 conferences sampled offered carbon offset options, and only 9% of these conferences implemented measures to reduce their environmental impact. The use of teleconferencing became increasingly prevalent in the aftermath of the COVID-19 pandemic.

== See also ==
- Abstract management
- Category:Academic terminology
- Academic writing
- Bullying in academia
- Congress
- Convention (meeting)
- Education
- French mathematical seminars
- Learned society
- Plenary session
- Poster session
- Proceedings
- Professional conference
- Research
- Scholarly article
- Scholarly method
- Scientific community
- Scientific method
- Scientific journal
- Seminar
