= Events Industry Council =

US-based non-profit organization

The Events Industry Council (formerly known as the Convention Industry Council (CIC)) is a non-profit federation of more than 30 U.S. and international organizations involved in the meetings, conventions and exhibitions industry. The Events Industry Council's member organizations represent more than 103,500 individuals and 19,300 firms or properties across all sectors of the industry.

== History ==
The Convention Liaison Council was founded in New York City in 1949 by four organizations – American Society of Association Executives (ASAE); American Hotel and Motel Association (AH&MA); Hospitality Sales & Marketing Association International (HSMAI); and International Association of Convention and Visitor Bureaus (IACVB). In 2000, the organization changed its name to the Convention Industry Council. In the years since its inception, CIC has grown to include more than 30 member organizations. The Events Industry Council is currently headquartered in Alexandria, VA. In 2017, the organization underwent a further name change to the Events Industry Council.

== Member organizations ==
- AMC Institute – Formerly IAAMC
- American Hotel & Lodging Association (AH&LA)
- American Society of Association Executives & The Center for Association Leadership (ASAE & The center)
- Association of Collegiate Conference and Events Directors-International (ACCED-I)
- Association of Destination Management Executives International (ADME International)
- Convention Sales Professionals International (CSPI)
- Corporate Event Marketing Association (CEMA)
- Destinations International
- Event Service Professionals Association (ESPA)
- Exhibition Services & Contractors Association (ESCA)
- Federacion De Entidades Organizadoras De Congresos Y Afines De America Latina (COCAL)
- Healthcare Convention and Exhibitors Association (HCEA)
- Hospitality Sales and Marketing Association International (HSMAI)
- International Association of Venue Managers (IAVM)
- International Association of Conference Centers (IACC)
- Incentive Research Foundation
- International Association of Exhibitions & Events (IAEE)
- International Association of Professional Congress Organisers (IAPCO)
- International Association of Speakers Bureaus (IASB)
- International Association of Venue Managers (IAVM)
- International Congress and Convention Association (ICCA)
- International Live Events Association (ILEA)
- Meeting Professionals International (MPI)
- National Association for Catering and Events (NACE)
- National Coalition of Black Meeting Planners (NCBMP)
- National Speakers Association (NSA)
- Professional Convention Management Association (PCMA)
- Religious Conference Management Association (RCMA)
- Society of Government Meeting Professionals (SGMP)
- Society for Incentive Travel Excellence (SITE)
- Society of Independent Show Organizers (SISO)
- Southern African Association of the Conference Industry (SAACI)
- US Travel Association (U.S. Travel)
