= Cumnock, North Carolina =

- Unincorporated community
- Location within North Carolina Location within the United States
- Coordinates: 35°33′18″N 79°14′16″W
- Country: United States
- State: North Carolina
- County: Lee
- Elevation: 272 ft (83 m)
- Time zone: UTC-5 (Eastern (EST))
  - Summer (DST): UTC-4 (EDT)
- ZIP code: 27237
- Area code: 919
- GNIS feature ID: 1019884

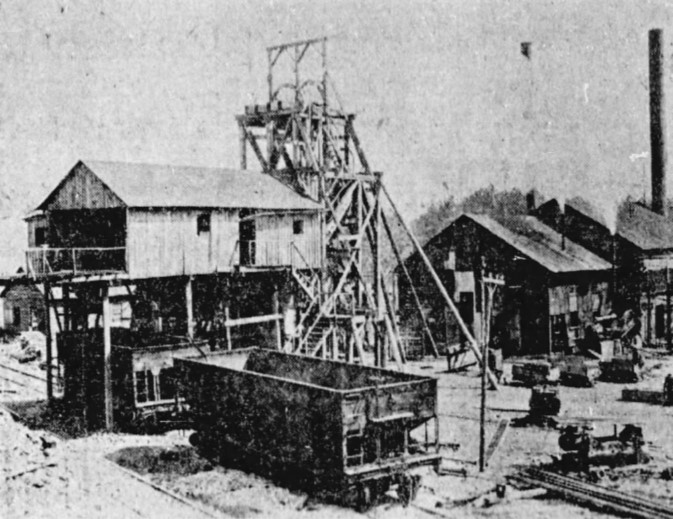
Coal mine in 1925

Cumnock, formerly known as Egypt, is an unincorporated community in northwestern Lee County, North Carolina, United States. It lies on Cumnock Road, about a mile north of U.S. Route 421.

Endor Iron Furnace is located near the community. It was listed on the National Register of Historic Places in 1974. The Deep River Camelback Truss Bridge was listed in 1995.

== History ==
In 1826, Peter Evans acquired 1,000 acres of land in the area and established a plantation. It is possible he dug small amounts of coal from the Deep River coal field in the area as early as 1830. Local tradition holds that his planation was nicknamed Egypt after a struggling farmer came there to buy corn in Biblical allusion to the Israelites' reliance on Ancient Egypt's storehouses. By 1852, the land was owned by Brooks Harris, who dug a 460 foot-deep shaft to exploit the coal deposit. The following year the property was purchased by New York financier Thomas Andrews and mined through his company. By 1856, there were permanent buildings at the site of the mine. The first of numerous explosions at the mine occurred that March, killing 11 workers. The 1860 U.S. census recorded a population of 70 people.

Demand for coal increased with the onset of the American Civil War. By 1863, the Western Railroad had been built to the community and a merchant partnered with the railroad president to ship coal to Fayetteville for the Confederate States Navy. Confederate ships' grew increasingly reliant on the coal as the war progressed, though crews were annoyed by the amount of smoke it produced. The coal was also used by the Confederate government for other purposes and for several businesses. During the Carolinas campaign, gun-making machinery from the Fayetteville Arsenal was stowed in Egypt's mine for safekeeping.

Egypt's economy proved durable immediately after the war owing to the continued operation of the mine and the nearby Endor Iron Furnace, though economic activity declined after the mine closed in the early 1870s and the railroad extended its line farther westward. In 1888, the mine and surrounding timberland were acquired by Philadelphia businessman Samuel A. Henszey through his Egypt Coal Company. In a bout of boosterism, the company platted out a city and constructed a hotel, though efforts at promoting such development ceased within a few years. Mining continued uninterrupted by the efforts at creating a larger community. In May 1895, the Cumnock Post Office was established in the community, though local tradition holds that the name of community was changed in homage to the Scottish mining town of Cumnock after a December 1895 explosion threatened to tarnish the community's original name and reputation. Further accidents, disputes among mining management, and financial losses led the mine to be closed in 1902, though the community persisted.

In the late 1910s the mine was reactivated by the Cumnock Coal Company. It was purchased by the Erskine-Ramsay Coal Company in 1922, which erected numerous homes for workers. Managers, merchants, and others in the community erected their own homes during this time period. The mine closed around 1930 due to economic pressures, accidents, and threats of flooding.

== Works cited ==
- Pezzoni, J. Daniel (1995). The History and Architecture of Lee County, North Carolina. Railroad House Historical Association. ISBN 0-9647954-0-X.
