= Association Forum of Chicagoland =

The Association Forum, formerly the Association Forum of Chicagoland, is a non-profit professional organization for association executives and supplier-partners. As of 2018, it serves nearly 4,000 members from over 400 associations in the Chicago metropolitan area.

Founded in 1916, the Association Forum was first known as the Chicago Business Secretaries Forum, then changed its name in the 1930s to Trade Association Executives Forum of Chicago, then to the Association Executives Forum of Chicago in the 1950s, then to the Chicago Society of Association Executives in the 1960s, and Association Forum of Chicagoland in the 1990s. In 2015, the organization is referred to as Association Forum.

Association Forum
