= Event management =

Purposeful and systematic planning of public events

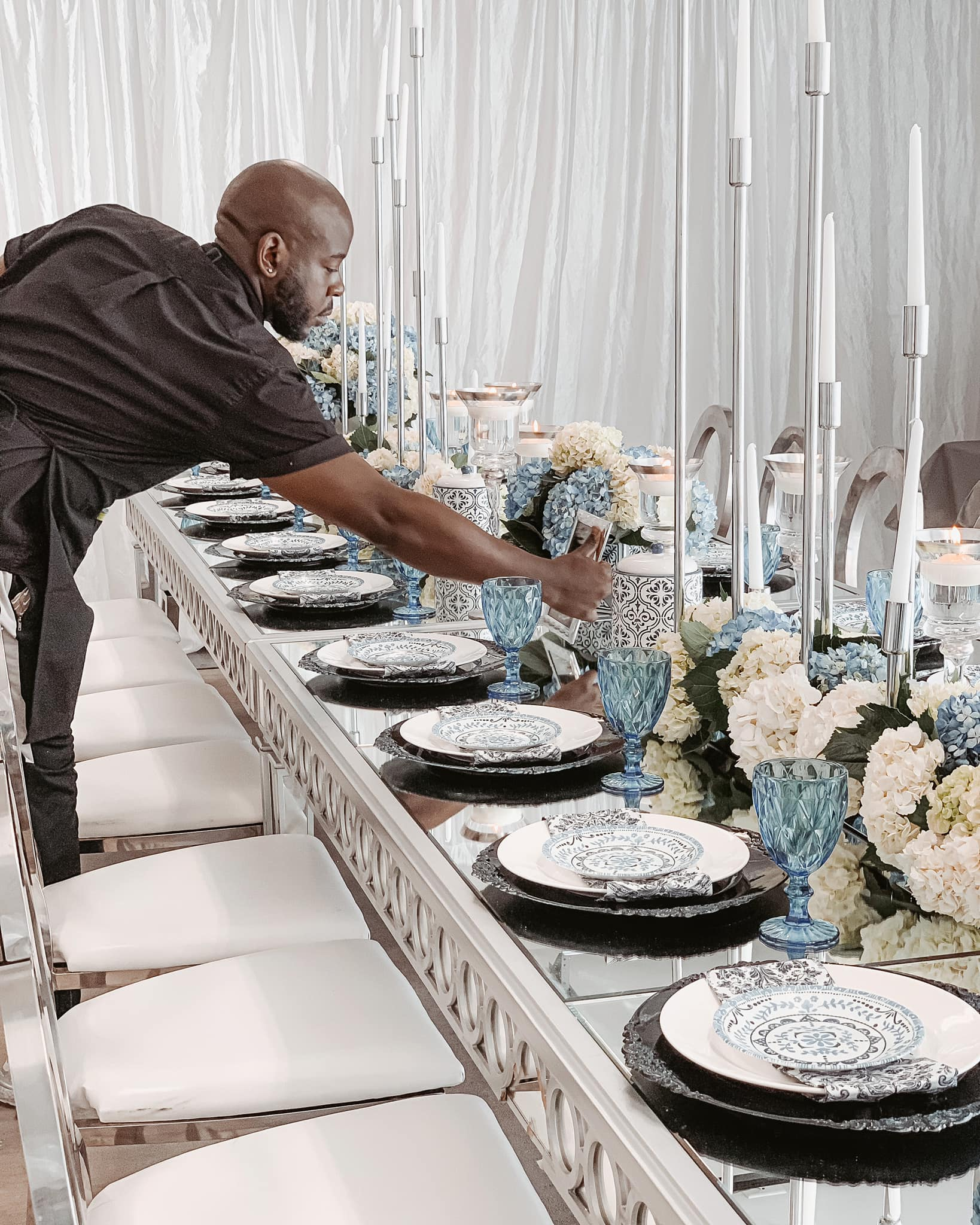
Event planner

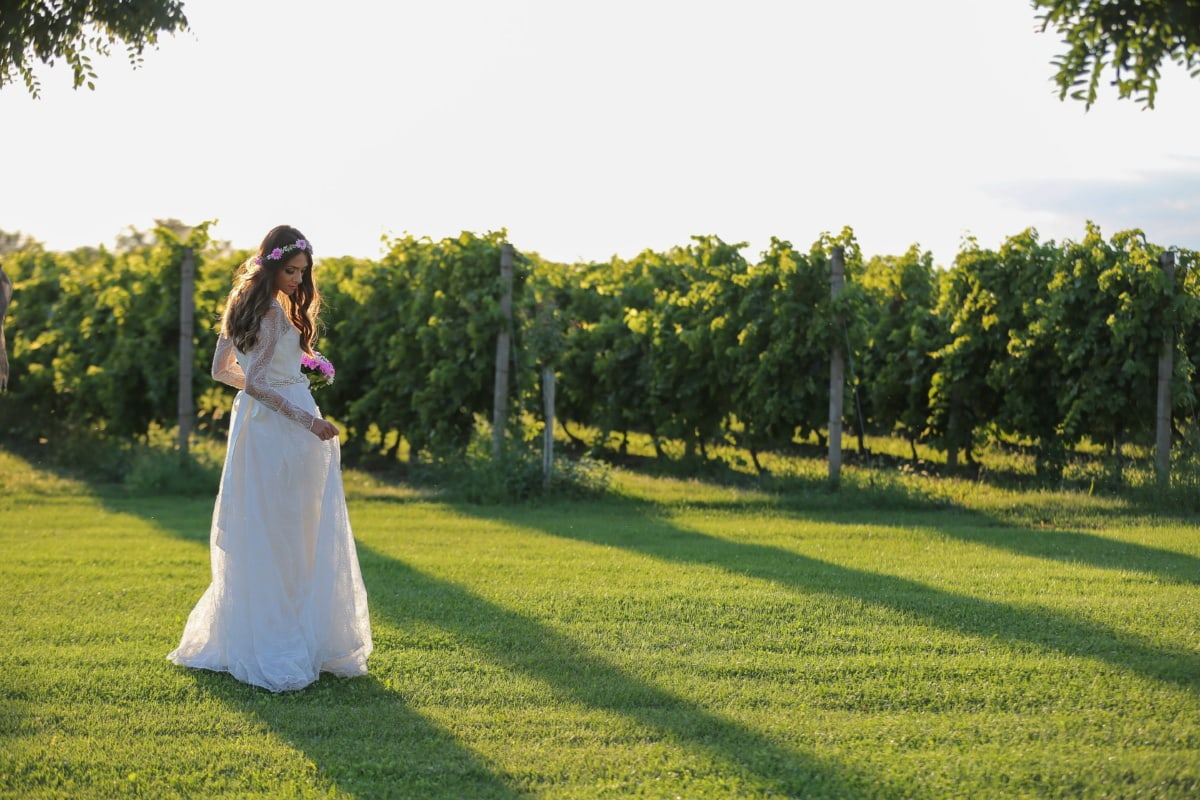
Wedding at a vineyard

Event management is the application of project management to the creation and development of small and/or large-scale personal or corporate events such as festivals, conferences, ceremonies, weddings, formal parties, concerts, or conventions. It involves studying the brand, identifying its target audience, devising the event concept, and coordinating the technical aspects before actually launching the event.

The events industry now includes events of all sizes from the Olympics down to business breakfast meetings. Many industries, celebrities, charitable organizations, and interest groups hold events in order to market their label, build business relationships, raise money, or celebrate achievement.

The process of planning and coordinating the event is usually referred to as event planning, which can include budgeting, scheduling, site selection, acquiring necessary permits, coordinating transportation and parking, arranging for speakers or entertainers, arranging decor, event security, catering, coordinating with third-party vendors, and emergency plans. Each event is different in its nature so process of planning and execution of each event differs on basis of the type of event.

The event manager is the person who plans and executes the event, taking responsibility for the creative, technical, and logistical elements. This includes overall event design, brand building, marketing and communication strategy, audio-visual production, script writing, logistics, budgeting, negotiation, and client service.

Due to the complexities involved, the extensive body of knowledge required, and the rapidly changing environment, event management is frequently cited as one of the most stressful career paths.

== Strategic marketing and communication ==
Event management might be a tool for strategic marketing and communication, used by companies of every size. Companies can benefit from promotional events as a way to communicate with current and potential customers. For instance, these advertising-focused events can occur as press conferences, promotional events, or product launches.

Event managers may also use traditional news media in order to target their audience, hoping to generate media coverage which will reach thousands or millions of people. They can also invite their audience to their events and reach them at the actual event.

== Event venue ==
An event venue may be an onsite or offsite location. The event manager is responsible for operations at a rented event or entertainment venue as they are coordinating directly with the property owner. An event manager will monitor all aspects of the event on-site. Some of the tasks listed in the introduction may pass to the venue, but usually at a cost.

Events present substantial liability risk to organizers and venues. Consequently, most venues require the organizers to obtain blanket or event-specific general liability insurance of an amount not less than $1,000,000 per occurrence and $2,000,000 aggregate, which is the industry standard.

Corporate event managers book event venues to host corporate meetings, conferences, networking events, trade shows, product launches, team-building retreats or training sessions in a more tailored environment.

== Sustainability ==
Sustainable event management (also known as event greening) is the process used to produce an event with particular concern for environmental, economic, and social issues. Sustainability in event management incorporates socially and environmentally responsible decision making into the planning, organization and implementation of, and participation in, an event. It involves including sustainable development principles and practices in all levels of event organization, and aims to ensure that an event is hosted responsibly. It represents the total package of interventions at an event, and needs to be done in an integrated manner. Event greening should start at the inception of the project, and should involve all the key role players, such as clients, organizers, venues, sub-contractors, and suppliers. A recent study shows that the trend of moving events from in-person to virtual and hybrid modes can reduce the carbon footprint by 94% (virtual) and by 67% (hybrid mode with over 50% in-person participation rate due to trade-offs between the per capita carbon footprint and in-person participation level).

== Technology ==
Event management software companies provide event planning with software tools to handle many common activities such as delegate registration, hotel booking, travel booking, or allocation of exhibition floor space.

A recent trend in event technology is the use of mobile apps for events. This technology is advancing and allowing event professionals to simplify and manage intricate and simple events more effectively. Mobile apps have a range of uses. They can be used to hold relatively static information such as the agenda, speaker biographies, and general FAQs. They can also encourage audience participation and engagement through interactive tools such as live voting/polling, submitting questions to speakers during Q&A, or building live interactive "word clouds". Mobile event apps can also be used by event organizers as a means of communication. The mobile apps help to make a better overall outcome of events and also help to remove a lot of a tedious work from event organizers. Organizers can communicate with participants through the use of alerts, notifications, and push messages. They can also be used to collect feedback from the participants through the use of surveys in app. Some mobile event apps can help participants to engage with each other, with sponsors, and with the organizers with built-in networking functionality.

== Education ==
There are an increasing number of universities which offer training in event management in the form of both certificates and undergraduate or graduate degrees.

The University of Central Florida's Rosen College of Hospitality Management offered the first ever Bachelor of Science degree in Event Management beginning in 2006. The program leverages core training in both hospitality, covering lodging operations, tourism, guest services, accounting, and marketing as well as event management, including sales, promotion, technology, design, risk management, and catering with electives available for specific interests, such as cruises, clubbing, wine, or trade shows. Other degree programs that do not offer a full degree usually offer concentrations, such as New York University, which offers a Bachelor of Science degree in Hotel and Tourism Management with a concentration in event management. The University of Florida offers a similar program as well.

Because of the limited number of undergraduate degree programs available, it is not uncommon for event managers to earn their degrees in business administration, marketing, or public relations. To supplement their candidacy, persons interested in event management typically earn one or more certifications which offer specialization into particular fields. Certifications available include:

- Certified Meeting Professional (CMP)
- Certified in Exhibition Management (CEM)
- Certified Trade Show Marketer (CTSM)
- Certificate in Meeting Management (CMM)
- Certified Professional in Catering and Events (CPCE)
- Certified Event Designer (CED)
- Certified Special Event Professional (CSEP)
- Project Management Professional (PMP)

== See also ==
- Event scheduling
- Media event
- Meeting and convention planner
- Sustainable event management
- To do list
