= Abstract management =

Abstract review and preparation

Abstract management is the process of accepting and preparing abstracts for presentation at an academic conference. The process consists of either invited or proffered submissions of the abstract or summary of work. The abstract typically states the hypothesis, tools used in research or investigation, data collected, and a summary or interpretation of the data.

The abstracts usually undergo peer review after which they are accepted or rejected by the conference chair or committee and then allocated to conference sessions. The abstracts may be presented as an oral talk or as an illustrated poster during the event. Abstracts are often published before or after the event as conference proceedings or in academic journals or online. In some cases submission of a full paper may be required before final acceptance is given. In some fields (e.g., computer science), most mainstream conferences and workshops ask for the submission of full papers (rather than just abstracts) and academic program committees peer review the full paper to a standard comparable to journal publication before accepting a paper for presentation at the conference and publishing it in an edited proceedings series.

The abstract management process is closely tied to the need to provide continuing education to professionals, especially continuing medical education. Many annual meetings hosted by specialty societies provide educational credit hours so that attendees may keep current in the field and maintain their professional certifications.

== Software ==
Historically, abstract management was a time-consuming manual process requiring the handling of large amounts of paper and created a considerable administrative workload. An increasing number of organizations now use web-based abstract management software to streamline and automate the process. The work is sometimes outsourced to dedicated conference departments at major publishers and professional conference organisers.

A conference management system is web-based software that supports the organization of conferences especially scientific conferences. It helps the program chair(s), the conference organizers, the authors and the reviewers in their respective activities.

A conference management system can be regarded as a domain-specific content management system. Similar systems are used today by editors of scientific journals.

=== Leading Solutions ===
A range of software tools are used to manage abstract submissions and peer review in academic and professional settings. These systems vary in scope, licensing model, and target audience, but can broadly be grouped into the following categories:

- Standalone abstract management systems
- Conference management platforms
- Open-source abstract management solutions,
