= Destinations International =

Tourism marketing organization

- Formation: 1914
- Type: Industry trade group
- Headquarters: 2025 M Street, NW, Suite 500; Washington, D.C.
- Location: United States • Brussels
- Region served: Worldwide
- Members: 658+ Destination Organizations and CVBs
- President & CEO: Don Welsh
- Main organ: Board of directors
- Budget: US$6,242,900
- Staff: 17
- Website: www.destinationsinternational.org

Destinations International, formerly known as Destination Marketing Association International (DMAI), is a professional organization representing destination organizations and convention and visitor bureaus worldwide.

As the world's largest resource for official destination organizations, Destinations International represents over 6,000 professionals from 575 destination organizations across the globe.

They provide members— professionals, industry partners, students and educators— with educational resources, networking opportunities and marketing benefits available worldwide.

They maintain an online bookstore and resource center, an e-mail discussion lists for members, professional certificates and designations (PDM, CDME), an accreditation program and an official online travel portal. Destinations International also owns the Meeting Information Network (MINT), the meetings and convention database.

== History ==
The present Destinations International was founded in 1915 in St. Louis by sales representatives of 28 different US destinations as the Association of Convention Secretaries whose goal was to share accurate information about conventions, promote sound professional practices in the solicitation and servicing of meetings and conventions, and develop "scientific" principles of convention management. After adding an international member to the group in 1919, the decision was made to change the name the following year (1920) to the International Association of Convention Bureaus (IACB). In 1974, the association changed its name again to the International Association of Convention and Visitors Bureau (IACVB) in order to reflect the growing importance of consumer travel. In August 2005, the association changed its name to become Destination Marketing Association International.

It was announced in March 2017 that the organization would change its name once again to more accurately reflect the changing role of Destination Marketing Organizations. The new name, Destinations International, was rolled out at the organization's annual meeting in Montreal in July.
