= International Association for Exposition Management =

The International Association of Exhibition and Events (IAEE) is a non-profit professional organization that represents the interests of trade show and exposition management.

Founded in 1928 as the National Association for Exposition Management, it has over 7000 members in 15 chapters worldwide. Chapters include:

- Persian Gulf Chapter
- Atlanta/Southeastern Chapter
- Central Texas Chapter
- Dallas/Fort Worth Chapter
- Florida Chapter
- Michigan Chapter
- Midwestern Chapter
- New England Chapter
- New York Chapter
- Northern California Chapter
- Ohio Valley Chapter
- Rocky Mountain Chapter
- Southwest Chapter
- UNLV Student Chapter
- Washington DC Chapter

On November 30, 2006, IAEE changed its name to the International Association for Exhibition and Events. (IAEE). IAEE holds an annual meeting, known as Expo! Expo!, during the fourth quarter of the year. The 2007 Annual Meeting was held at the Mandalay Bay Convention Center in Las Vegas, NV on December 10-12.

IAEM is headquartered in Dallas, Texas
