= Council of Engineering and Scientific Society Executives =

The Council of Engineering and Scientific Society Executives (CESSE) is a non-profit professional organization for executive directors and executive vice presidents of science and engineering societies in the USA.

Founded in 1977 and headquartered in Chicago, IL, CESSE's objective is to advance the management of engineering and scientific societies and to advance the exchange of ideas among professional technical societies in the United States and Canada.

== Participating organizations ==
Among the organizations that are members (as of November 15, 2006) include the American Association for the Advancement of Science, the American Chemical Society, American Oil Chemists' Society, the American Society for Microbiology, the American Society for Quality, the American Society of Civil Engineers, the Institute of Food Technologists, the Institute of Industrial Engineers, the American Society of Mechanical Engineers, the National Academy of Engineering, Sigma Xi, and Tau Beta Pi.
