= American Society of Association Executives =

American professional organization

The American Society of Association Executives (ASAE) is the membership organization and voice of the association profession. The company was founded in 1920 and is headquartered in Washington, D.C.

The ASAE manages the Power of A, which is its advocacy platform. It is the American sponsor of the Certified Association Executive (CAE) professional certification program.

== History ==
In 1963, ASAE's board created the ASAE Foundation with the stated purpose "to advance the science of association management, to diffuse and cultivate knowledge and understanding of associations, and to uphold the high standards of associations generally."

Michelle Mason has been the president and chief executive officer of ASAE since September 2021.

== See also ==
- Nonprofit organization
