= Fayetteville Cutoff =

Railway line in North Carolina and South Carolina

Overview
- Status: Still operating
- Owner: Atlantic Coast Line Railroad (1899-1967); Seaboard Coast Line Railroad (1967-1986); CSX Transportation (1986-present)

Technical
- Line length: 141.2 mi (227.2 km)
- Track gauge: 1,435 mm (4 ft 8 1/2 in) standard gauge
- Electrification: No
- Signalling: Centralized traffic control

The Fayetteville Cutoff was a railroad line in North Carolina and South Carolina built by predecessors of the Atlantic Coast Line Railroad connecting Wilson, North Carolina with Pee Dee, South Carolina (just east of Florence). Its main purpose was to shorten the Atlantic Coast Line's main line.

== History ==
By 1885, the Wilmington and Weldon Railroad and the Wilmington and Manchester Railroad together formed a continuous route from Weldon southeast to Wilmington, which then turned back east to Florence, South Carolina. Both of these railroads were controlled by William T. Walters and were operated independently but were advertised together as the Atlantic Coast Line. Despite the importance of the port city of Wilmington, this route gave the Atlantic Coast Line a disadvantage over its competitors who operated more direct north–south routes in North Carolina. To combat this disadvantage, the management of the railroads planned the Fayetteville Cutoff, which would run from Contentnea (just south of Wilson, North Carolina) through Fayetteville to the Pee Dee River in South Carolina just east of Florence. The route was largely built in three segments.

The northern segment of the line, which was chartered as the Wilson & Fayetteville Railroad, was built from 1885 to 1886. It branched off the Wilmington and Weldon Railroad at Contentnea (just south of Wilson) and ran to Fayetteville.

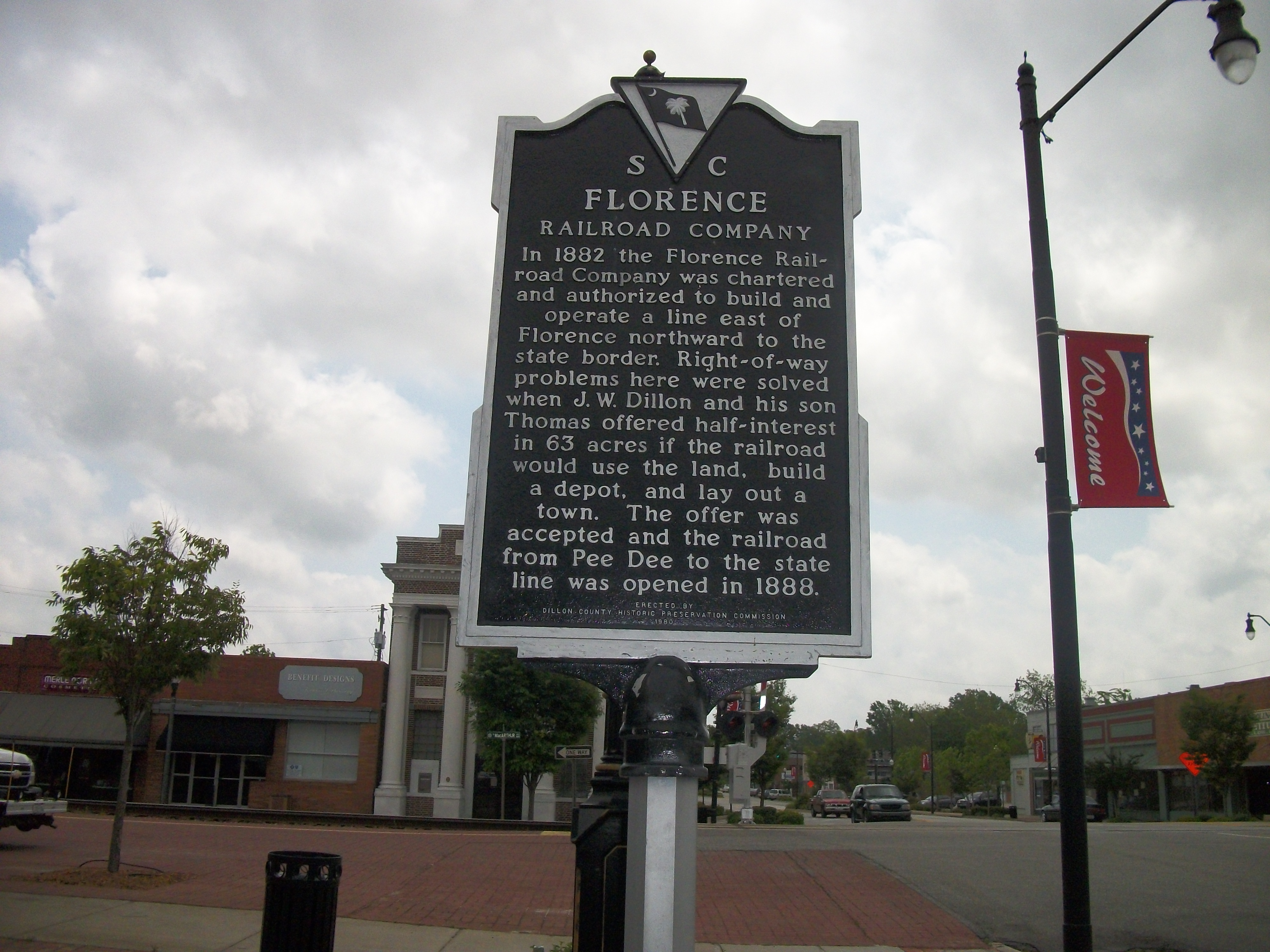
Historic marker for the Florence Railroad at Dillon (Amtrak station).

The southern segment of the line, which was chartered as the Florence Railroad by the South Carolina General Assembly in 1882 opened in 1888. It ran from the Wilmington and Manchester Railroad from Pee Dee (east of Florence) north to the North Carolina/South Carolina border near Rowland, North Carolina. Some of the right of way near the north end of this segment was provided by J.W. Dillon in exchange for the railroad building a depot in Dillon, his namesake town.

The final segment to be built was the middle section from Rowland to Fayetteville which opened in 1892. The line was successful and would shorten the distance of the Atlantic Coast Line route by 61 miles.

By 1899, the line, along with the Wilmington and Weldon Railroad and the Wilmington and Manchester Railroad were formally merged into the Atlantic Coast Line Railroad. The Fayetteville Cutoff would remain part of the Atlantic Coast Line's main line. Through various mergers, the Atlantic Coast Line Railroad became part of CSX Transportation by 1986. The line is still operating today and is part of CSX's A Line (South End Subdivision).

== Station Listing ==
State	Milepost	City/Location	Station	Connections and notes
NC	A 138.9		Contentnea	junction with Wilmington and Weldon Railroad (ACL)
NC	A 144.2	Lucama	Lucama	
NC	A 151.2	Kenly	Kenly	named for ACL president John R. Kenly
NC	A 156.3	Micro	Micro	
NC	A 161.2	Selma	Selma	Amtrak Carolinian, Palmetto original station replaced by Selma Union Depot in 1924 junction with the North Carolina Railroad (SOU)
NC	A 164.8	Smithfield	Smithfield	junction with Smithfield and Goldsboro Railroad (W&W/ACL)
NC	A 171.5	Four Oaks	Four Oaks	
NC	A 180.0	Benson	Benson	
NC	A 186.0	Dunn	Dunn	
NC	A 194.6	Godwin	Godwin	
NC	A 198.5	Wade	Wade	
NC	A 204.1		Beard	
NC	A 209.7	Fayetteville	Fayetteville	Amtrak Silver Meteor, Palmetto current station built in 1911 junction with: Cape Fear and Yadkin Valley Railway (ACL); Raleigh and Southport Railroad (NS)
NC	A 216.1	Hope Mills	Hope Mills	junction with Aberdeen and Rockfish Railroad
NC	A 222.9	Parkton	Parkton	
NC	A 227.7		Rex	
NC	A 230.2	Rennert	Rennert	
NC	A 236.5		Buie	
NC	A 241.3	Pembroke	Pembroke	junction with Carolina Central Railroad (SAL)
NC	A 246.3		Elrod	junction with Southeastern Railroad (ACL)
NC	A 252.8	Rowland	Rowland	
SC	A 257.1		Hamer	
SC	A 262.2	Dillon	Dillon	junction with North and South Carolina Railway (SAL)
SC	A 269.1	Latta	Latta	
SC	A 273.4	Sellers	Sellers	
SC	A 280.1		Pee Dee	junction with Wilmington and Manchester Railroad (ACL)
