= Wilson station (North Carolina) =

G.K. Butterfield Train Station Wilson, NC
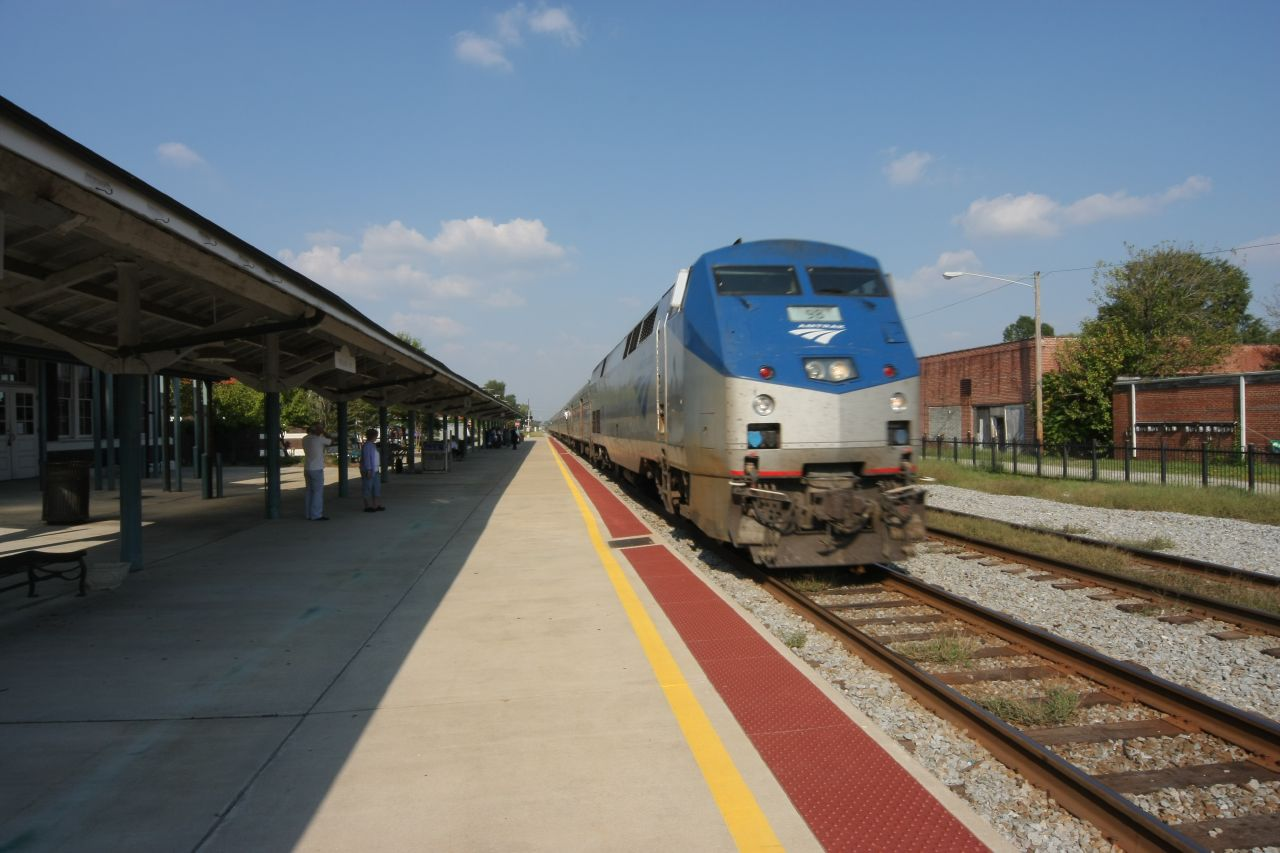
- Train #89 on the Palmetto route pulls into Wilson.

General information
- Location: 401 East Nash Street; Wilson, North Carolina; United States
- Coordinates: 35.723765°N 77.908216°W
- Owner: City of Wilson
- Line: South End Subdivision
- Platforms: 1 side platform
- Tracks: 1
- Connections: Amtrak Thruway

Construction
- Structure type: At-grade
- Parking: 20 spaces; free
- Accessible: Yes
- Architect: A.M. Griffin
- Architectural style: Flemish-Spanish Mission

Other information
- Station code: Amtrak: WLN

History
- Opened: 1924
- Rebuilt: 1996–1998
- Original company: Atlantic Coast Line Railroad

Passengers
- FY 2025: 59,187 (Amtrak)

Services
Preceding station	Amtrak	Following station
Selma toward Charlotte	Carolinian	Rocky Mount toward New York
Selma toward Savannah	Palmetto	Rocky Mount toward New York
Auto Train does not stop here
Floridian does not stop here
Silver Meteor does not stop here
Former services
Preceding station	Amtrak	Following station
Fayetteville toward Miami	Silver Meteor	Rocky Mount toward New York
Preceding station	Atlantic Coast Line Railroad	Following station
Lucama toward Tampa	Main Line	Elm City toward Richmond
Terminus	Wilson – Wilmington	Black Creek toward Wilmington

U.S. Historic district – Contributing property
- Official name: Atlantic Coast Line Railroad Passenger and Freight Station
- Designated: December 20, 1984
- Part of: Wilson Central Business-Tobacco; Warehouse Historic District
- Reference no.: 84003876
- Architectural style: Flemish-Spanish Mission
Location

G.K. Butterfield Train Station, also known as Wilson station, is an Amtrak train station in Wilson, North Carolina, United States. It is located in downtown Wilson and is part of the Wilson Central Business–Tobacco Warehouse Historic District.

== History ==
The station was originally built in 1924 by the Atlantic Coast Line Railroad, designed by architect A.M. Griffin, and contained a separate REA Express building. The city bought both buildings from CSX in 1994 and it was restored to its original condition between 1996 and 1998. The REA Express building was converted into a police substation.

In 2024, Amtrak completed $4 million in renovations to the station, in partnership with the Federal Railroad Administration (FRA) and in cooperation with the City of Wilson, North Carolina Department of Transportation, and CSX. This included a new 435-foot-long (133 m) concrete platform with safety lines, additional lighting, guardrails, and signage; the 378-foot-long (115 m) canopy was restored with new roof decking and copper gutters before its slate roof was replaced. And the original stanchions were painted purple and the wood above painted white, which were original Atlantic Coast Line Railroad colors. On October 24, 2024, the station was renamed at a dedication ceremony in honor of G.K. Butterfield in recognition of his decades-long public service to Wilson.

== Services ==
The station, operated by Amtrak, provides inter-city rail service via two routes: Carolinian and Palmetto. The facility is open daily at 9:00am–5:00pm, which includes the ticket office, passenger assistance, baggage service and the waiting area.

Located cater-cornered from the station is the Wilson Transportation Center, providing local and intercity bus services.

Through Amtrak Thruway buses, the station also serves a large swath of eastern North Carolina. One route serves Greenville, New Bern, Havelock, and Morehead City; another serves Goldsboro, Kinston, Jacksonville, and Wilmington.
