= Palmetto (train) =

Amtrak service between New York and Savannah

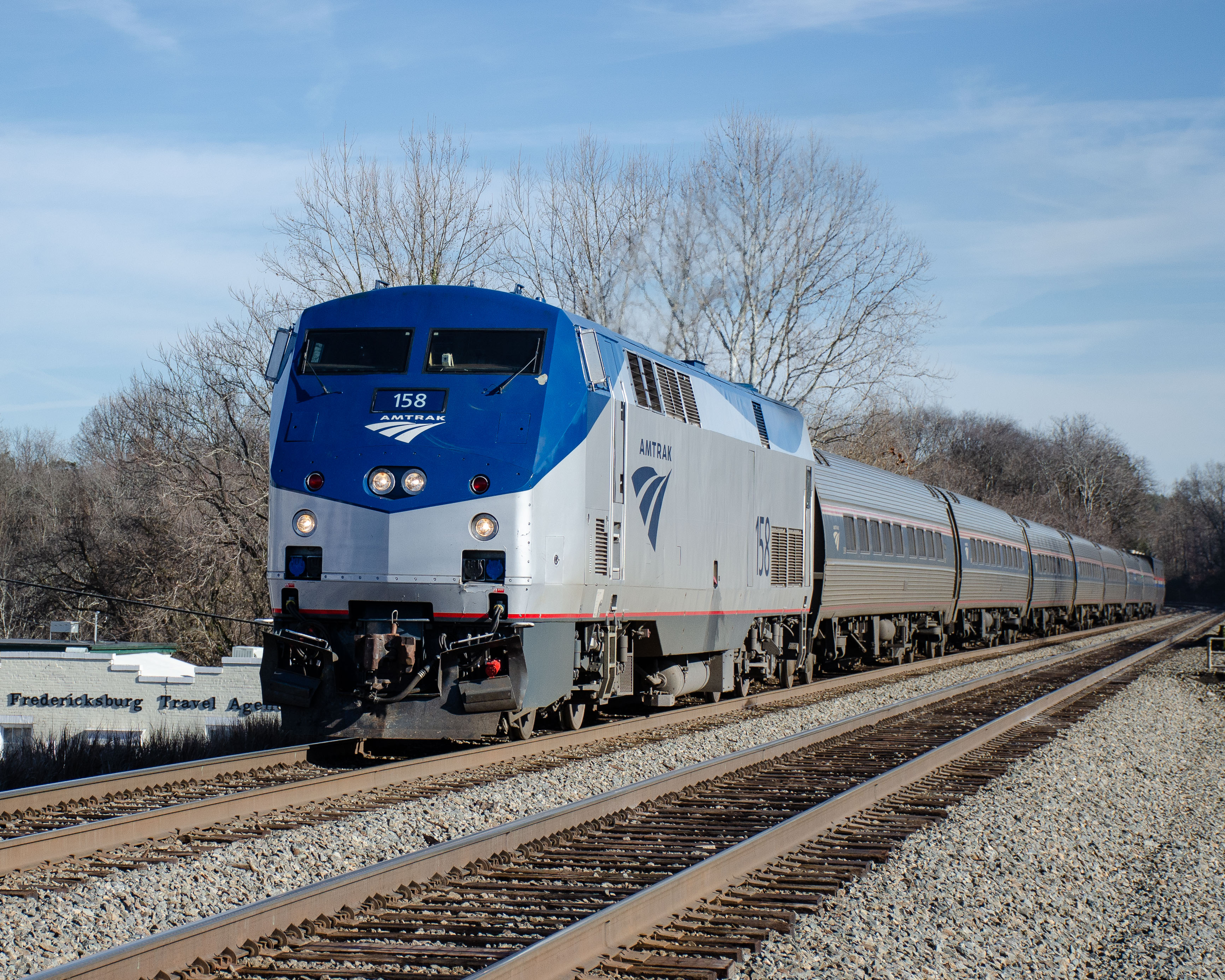
- The southbound Palmetto at Fredericksburg station in 2018

Overview
- Service type: Inter-city rail
- Locale: Northeastern, Mid-Atlantic and Southeastern United States
- Predecessor: Palmetto (Atlantic Coast Line Railroad)
- First service: June 15, 1976 (original); May 1, 2002 (current)
- Last service: February 1, 1995 (original)
- Current operator: Amtrak
- Annual ridership: 357,200 (FY 25) 0% (Note: Amtrak's Fiscal Year (FY) runs from October 1 of the prior year to September 30 of the named year.)

Route
- Termini: New York City, New York; Savannah, Georgia
- Stops: 23
- Distance travelled: 829 miles (1,334 km)
- Average journey time: 15 hours, 36 minutes (northbound); 15 hours, 2 minutes (southbound)
- Service frequency: Daily
- Train number: 89, 90

On-board services
- Classes: Coach Class; Business Class
- Disabled access: All train cars, most stations
- Catering facilities: Café
- Baggage facilities: Overhead racks, checked baggage available at selected stations

Technical
- Rolling stock: Amfleet
- Track gauge: 4 ft 8 1/2 in (1,435 mm) standard gauge
- Electrification: Overhead line, 12 kV AC at 25 Hz (New York–Washington)
- Operating speed: 54 mph (87 km/h) (avg.); 125 mph (201 km/h) (top)
- Track owners: Amtrak, CSX

The Palmetto is a passenger train operated by Amtrak on a 829-mile (1,334 km) route between New York City and Savannah, Georgia, via the Northeast Corridor, Washington, D.C., Richmond, Virginia, Fayetteville, North Carolina, and Charleston, South Carolina. The Palmetto is a shorter version of the Silver Meteor, which continues south to Miami, Florida. From 1996 to 2002 this service was called the Silver Palm. Although currently a day train, the Palmetto is considered a long-distance train by Amtrak and previously provided overnight sleeper service to Florida.

During fiscal year 2019, the Palmetto carried 345,342 passengers, a decrease of 11% from FY2018. The train had a total revenue of $27,208,372 during FY2016, a 61.4% increase over FY2015.

== History ==
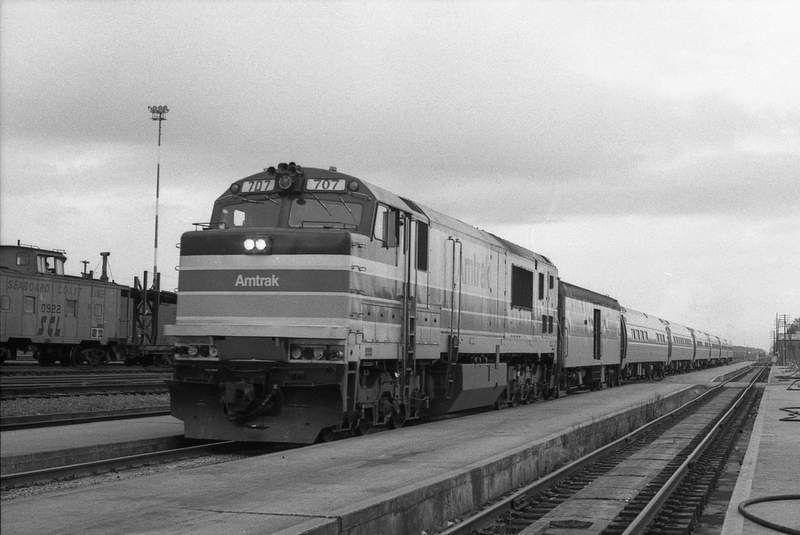
The Palmetto at Florence, South Carolina, in 1977. A GE P30CH is in the lead.

The "Palmetto" name was first used by the Atlantic Coast Line Railroad in 1909 for the Palmetto Limited, which ran from New York City to Augusta and Savannah, Georgia, with a connection to Atlanta via the Georgia Railroad. The ACL train was discontinued in 1968.

Amtrak introduced the new Palmetto on June 15, 1976. The train drew its name from the Sabal palmetto, the state tree of South Carolina. The Palmetto was the first train in the Southern United States to receive the then-new Amfleet equipment, and the 828-mile (1,333 km) run was the longest at the time for the new coaches. At the time of introduction, Amtrak planned to run the Palmetto daily for the summer only, with service ending September 8. However, citing better-than-expected ridership, Amtrak extended the Palmetto to a year-round service indefinitely. In October 1976 the Florida Department of Transportation urged Amtrak to extend the Palmetto south to Miami.

In October 1984, Amtrak began operating the Carolinian, a North Carolina-focused regional train, as a section of the Palmetto. The two trains ran combined between New York and Richmond, Virginia. At Richmond the Carolinian continued separately to Raleigh and Charlotte, North Carolina. The Carolinian was discontinued in September 1985, after the state of North Carolina refused to increase its support for the train, and then revived in 1990.

In December 1988 Amtrak extended the Palmetto south to Jacksonville, Florida. The train continued to be coach-only, without full dining service. Beginning on May 12, 1990, the Palmetto combined with a revived Carolinian, although this time the split occurred in Rocky Mount, North Carolina. The two trains began running independently to New York in April 1991. In October 1994 the Palmetto became a full overnight with sleeper and dining car service, running through to Tampa, Florida. This replaced the Silver Meteor's Tampa section. This extension was short-lived: budget cuts under the Clinton administration led to the Palmetto's discontinuance on February 1, 1995.

=== Revival ===
Amtrak added a third train from New York to Miami on November 10, 1996, known as the Silver Palm in line with the Silver Service brand for Amtrak's Florida trains. However, it used the same route as the former Palmetto and carried the same numbers (89 southbound and 90 northbound). At Jacksonville the Silver Palm turned west and continued over the old Seaboard Air Line Railroad main line via Waldo, Ocala, Wildwood and Dade City to Tampa. This replaced the Tampa section of the Silver Meteor. At Tampa, it reversed and ran south to Miami. In April 2002, budget cuts caused Amtrak to remove the sleepers and dining car, turning it into an all-coach train. It returned to the Palmetto name to differentiate it from the Silver Service brand.

On November 1, 2004, Amtrak truncated the Palmetto to Savannah, Georgia, operating a daytime schedule to and from New York (as it had prior to 1994). With the truncation to Savannah, the Silver Star was rerouted to serve Tampa; the old Jacksonville-Lakeland route is now served by a Amtrak Thruway bus transfer from the Silver Star, which serves all the former stations as well as Gainesville.

In the January 2011 issue of Trains magazine, this route was listed as one of five routes to be looked at by Amtrak in FY 2011 as the previous five routes (Sunset, Eagle, Zephyr, Capitol, and Cardinal) were examined in FY 2010. In October 2015, in an effort to reduce redundant trains, Amtrak temporarily cancelled one daily Northeast Regional round trip and allowed the Palmetto to take local passengers north of Washington. Stops at New Carrollton, BWI Airport, and Metropark were added to the Palmetto.

On April 3, 2016, the southbound Palmetto struck a backhoe while travelling through Chester, Pennsylvania, killing two track workers and derailing the locomotive, as well as damaging the first two cars of the train.

== Operation ==
=== Equipment ===
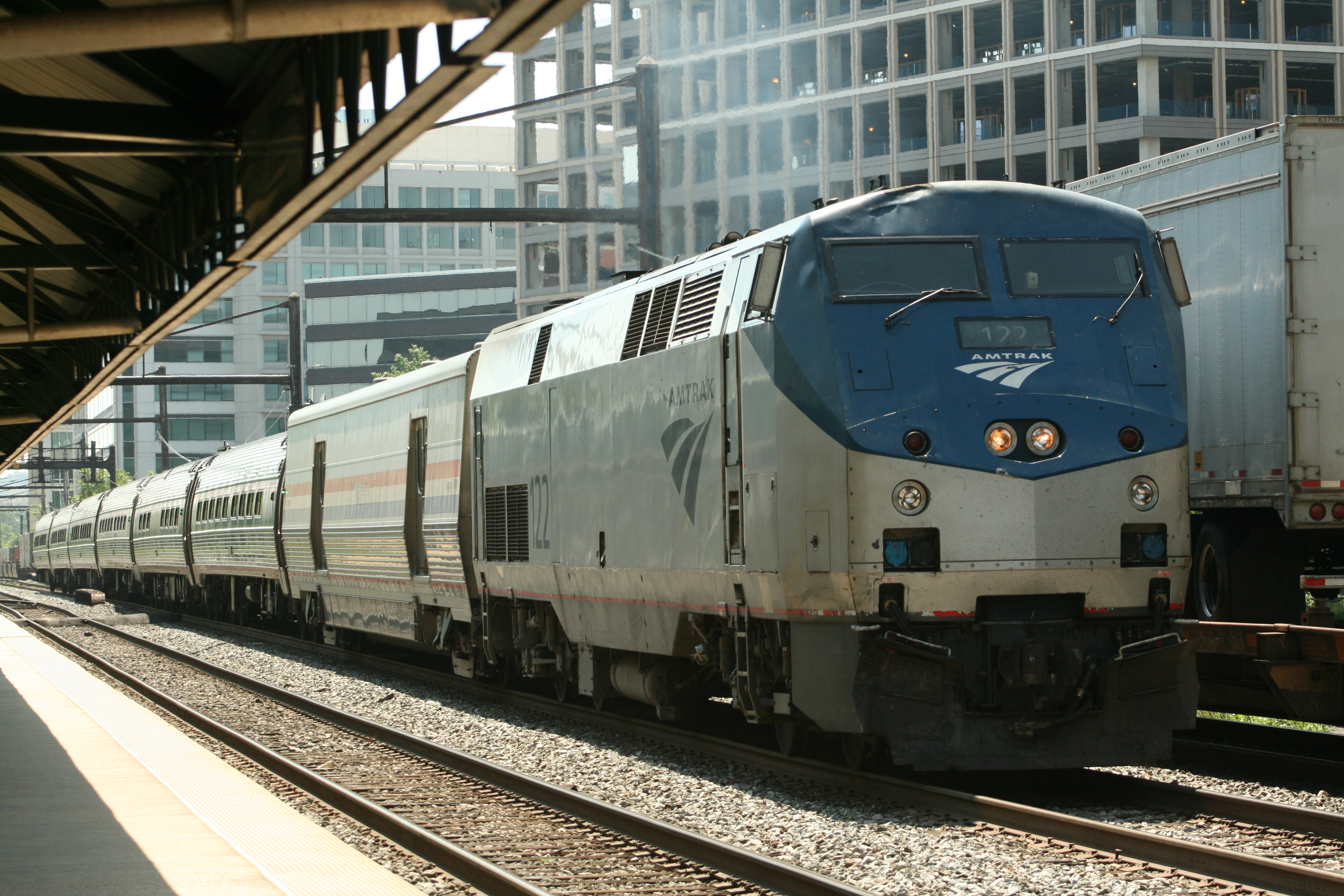
Southbound Palmetto passing L'Enfant Plaza station, May 2015

A typical Palmetto consists of a locomotive, a Viewliner baggage car, an Amfleet club car (with 1×2 Business Class seating and a food service area), and four or five Amfleet coaches. Unlike most Amtrak long-distance trains, the Palmetto does not carry sleeping cars or a dining car, which were removed from the train in 2002.

Between Savannah and Washington, trains are pulled by a GE Genesis or Siemens Charger diesel locomotive at speeds up to 79 miles per hour (127 km/h). Between Washington and New York, the service operates over the Northeast Corridor which has overhead electric lines and trains are pulled by Siemens ACS-64 electric locomotives at speeds up to 125 miles per hour (201 km/h).

By 2031, the train's existing equipment is expected to be replaced by Amtrak Airo trainsets, Amtrak's branding for trainsets combining Siemens Venture passenger cars with a Siemens Charger diesel-electric locomotive. The Palmetto trainsets will include six passenger cars with a food service area and a mix of 2×2 Coach Class and 1×2 Business Class seating. The car nearest the locomotive will be an "Auxiliary Power Vehicle" (APV) equipped with a pantograph to draw power from overhead lines and supply electricity to four electric traction motors in the APV and four in the locomotive. The design is intended to allow near-seamless transitions between diesel and electric operation, eliminating the need for a time-consuming locomotive change in Washington.

=== Classes of service ===
The cafe car includes complimentary WiFi and electric outlets. All classes of service have an electric outlet (120 V, 60 Hz AC) at each seat, reading lamps, fold-out tray tables. Reservations are required on all trains, tickets may be purchased online, from an agent at some stations, a ticketing machine at most stations, or, at a higher cost, from the conductor on the train.

- Coach Class: 2x2 seating. Passengers self-select seats on a first-come, first-served basis.
- Business Class: 2x1 seating with more legroom than coach. Passengers receive complimentary soft drinks. Seats assigned in advance.

=== Route ===
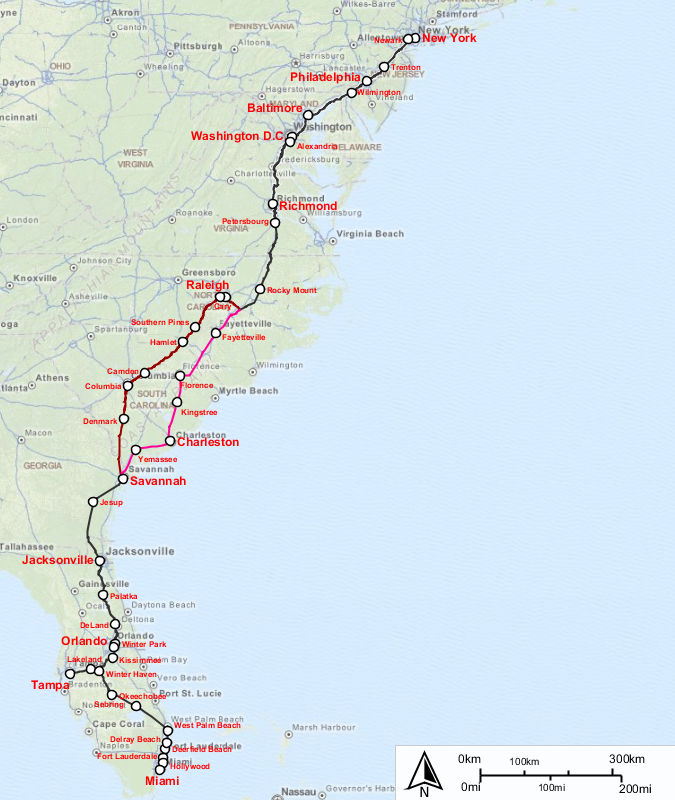
Amtrak Silver Service (specific Palmetto stops are not marked)

The Palmetto's route has not changed significantly since it first ran in 1976. It parallels the Florida-bound Silver Meteor, making additional station stops. When introduced in 1976 it included two new stations: Dillon and Kingstree, South Carolina. As of 2011 Kingstree sees the Silver Meteor as well. The Palmetto added Selma, North Carolina (Smithfield) in October 1982. In October 2015, it added New Carrollton, BWI Airport, and Metropark.

The Palmetto operates over Amtrak and CSX Transportation trackage:

- New York – Washington D.C. (Amtrak)
  - Northeast Corridor
- Washington D.C. – Savannah, GA (CSXT)
  - RF&P Subdivision
  - Richmond Terminal Subdivision
  - North End Subdivision
  - South End Subdivision
  - Charleston Subdivision
  - Savannah Subdivision

Unlike other long-distance trains, the Palmetto makes local stops along the Northeast Corridor as well as major city stops. It stops at Metropark and BWI Airport in both directions.

Before 2019, the southbound Palmetto followed the practice of most medium- and long-distance trains running in the Northeast, and did not allow passengers to travel only between stations in the Northeast Corridor. It only stopped to receive passengers between Newark and Washington. This policy was intended to keep seats available for passengers making longer trips. Starting in 2019, the southbound Palmetto began allowing local travel along the Northeast Corridor. The northbound Palmetto has allowed such local travel since 2015.

=== Bus connections ===
Amtrak Thruway bus routes began operating in eastern North Carolina in October 2012 that connect to the northbound and southbound Palmetto at the Wilson, North Carolina station. One route serves Greenville, New Bern, Havelock, and Morehead City; the other route serves Goldsboro, Kinston, Jacksonville, and Wilmington.

== Stations ==
| State | Town/City | Station | Connections |
|---|---|---|---|
| New York | New York City | New York; Penn Station | Amtrak (long-distance): Cardinal, Crescent, Lake Shore Limited, Silver Meteor; Amtrak (intercity): Acela, Adirondack, Berkshire Flyer, Carolinian, Empire Service, Ethan Allen Express, Keystone Service, Maple Leaf, Northeast Regional, Pennsylvanian, Vermonter; LIRR: ■ City Terminal Zone, ■ Port Washington Branch; NJ Transit: ■ North Jersey Coast Line, ■ Northeast Corridor Line, ■ Gladstone Branch, ■ Montclair–Boonton Line, ■ Morristown Line; NYC Subway: PATH: HOB-33 JSQ-33 JSQ-33 (via HOB); MTA Bus |
| New Jersey | Newark | Newark; Penn Station | Amtrak: Acela, Cardinal, Carolinian, Crescent, Keystone Service, Northeast Regional, Pennsylvanian, Silver Meteor, Vermonter; NJ Transit: ■ North Jersey Coast Line, ■ Northeast Corridor Line, ■ Raritan Valley Line; PATH: NWK-WTC; Newark Light Rail; NJ Transit Bus |
| New Jersey | Iselin | Metropark | Amtrak: Acela, Keystone Service, Keystone Service, Northeast Regional, Vermonter; NJ Transit: ■ Northeast Corridor Line; NJ Transit Bus |
| New Jersey | Trenton | Trenton | Amtrak: Cardinal, Carolinian, Crescent, Keystone Service, Northeast Regional, Pennsylvanian, Silver Meteor, Vermonter; NJ Transit: ■ Northeast Corridor Line, ■ River Line; SEPTA Regional Rail: ■ Trenton Line; NJ Transit Bus, SEPTA Suburban Bus |
| Pennsylvania | Philadelphia | 30th Street Station | Amtrak: Acela, Cardinal, Carolinian, Crescent, Keystone Service, Northeast Regional, Pennsylvanian, Silver Meteor, Vermonter; SEPTA Regional Rail: all lines NJ Transit: ■ Atlantic City Line; SEPTA Metro: SEPTA City Bus, SEPTA Suburban Bus |
| Delaware | Wilmington | Wilmington | Amtrak: Acela, Cardinal, Carolinian, Crescent, Northeast Regional, Silver Meteor, Vermonter; SEPTA Regional Rail: ■ Wilmington/Newark Line; DART First State; Greyhound Lines |
| Maryland | Baltimore | Baltimore; Penn Station | Amtrak: Acela, Cardinal, Carolinian, Crescent, Northeast Regional, Silver Meteor, Vermonter; MARC: ■ Penn Line; Light RailLink; MTA Maryland, Charm City Circulator |
| Maryland | Baltimore | BWI Airport | Amtrak: Acela, Crescent, Northeast Regional, Vermonter; MARC: ■ Penn Line; Shuttle to Baltimore/Washington International Airport; MTA Maryland, Howard Transit, UMBC Transit |
| Maryland | New Carrollton | New Carrollton | Amtrak: Northeast Regional, Vermonter; MARC: ■ Penn Line; Metro: Orange Line, Silver Line; Metrobus, TheBus, MTA Maryland |
| District of Columbia | Washington | Washington; Union Station | Amtrak: Acela, Cardinal, Carolinian, Crescent, Floridian, Northeast Regional, Silver Meteor, Vermonter; MARC: ■ Brunswick Line, ■ Camden Line, ■ Penn Line; VRE: ■ Manassas Line, ■ Fredericksburg Line; Metro: Red Line; Metrobus, MTA Maryland, Loudoun County Transit, OmniRide; Intercity bus: Greyhound, Megabus, BestBus, Peter Pan, OurBus |
| Virginia | Alexandria | Alexandria | Amtrak: Cardinal, Carolinian, Crescent, Floridian, Northeast Regional, Silver Meteor; VRE: ■ Fredericksburg Line, ■ Manassas Line; Metro: Blue Line, Yellow Line; Metrobus, DASH |
| Virginia | Richmond | Richmond; Staples Mill Road | Amtrak: Carolinian, Floridian, Northeast Regional, Silver Meteor, Amtrak Thruway to Charlottesville, Virginia; Greater Richmond Transit Company |
| Virginia | Ettrick | Petersburg | Amtrak: Carolinian, Floridian, Northeast Regional, Silver Meteor; Petersburg Area Transit |
| North Carolina | Rocky Mount | Rocky Mount | Amtrak: Carolinian, Floridian, Silver Meteor; Tar River Transit; Intercity bus: Greyhound Lines |
| North Carolina | Wilson | Wilson | Amtrak: Carolinian, Amtrak Thruway to Greenville, New Bern, Havelock, Morehead City, Goldsboro, Kinston, Jacksonville, Wilmington; Cape Fear Public Transportation Authority |
| North Carolina | Selma | Selma–Smithfield | Amtrak: Carolinian; Johnston County Area Transit System |
| North Carolina | Fayetteville | Fayetteville | Amtrak: Silver Meteor; Fayetteville Area System of Transit |
| South Carolina | Dillon | Dillon | Pee Dee Regional Transportation Authority |
| South Carolina | Florence | Florence | Amtrak: Silver Meteor; Pee Dee Regional Transportation Authority |
| South Carolina | Kingstree | Kingstree | Amtrak: Silver Meteor; Williamsburg County Transit System |
| South Carolina | North Charleston | Charleston | Amtrak: Silver Meteor; Charleston Area Regional Transportation Authority, Southeastern Stages |
| South Carolina | Yemassee | Yemassee | Amtrak: Silver Meteor; Lowcountry Regional Transportation Authority, Palmetto Breeze |
| Georgia | Savannah | Savannah | Amtrak: Floridian, Silver Meteor; Chatham Area Transit |
