= Florence station (South Carolina) =

Train station

Florence, SC
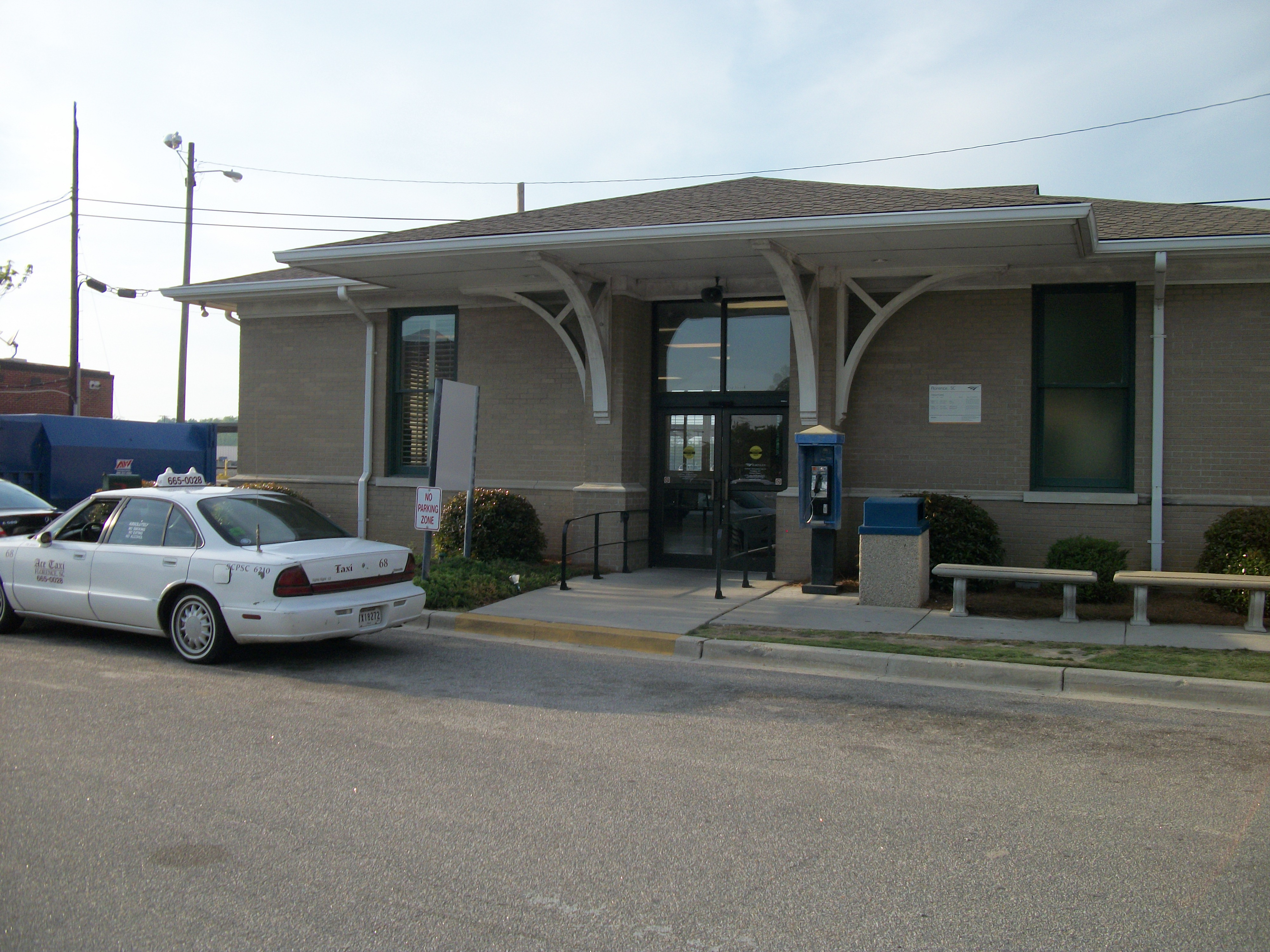
- Florence station building

General information
- Location: 805 East Day Street; Florence, South Carolina; United States
- Coordinates: 34.1993°N 79.7575°W
- Owner: McLeod Health / CSX
- Line: CSX South End Subdivision
- Platforms: 1 side platform
- Tracks: 1

Construction
- Accessible: Yes

Other information
- Station code: Amtrak: FLO

History
- Opened: 1910
- Rebuilt: 1996

Passengers
- FY 2025: 41,695 (Amtrak)

Services
| Preceding station | Amtrak | Following station |
|---|---|---|
| Sanford Terminus | Auto Train (Service stop only) | Lorton Terminus |
| Kingstree toward Savannah | Palmetto | Dillon toward New York |
| Kingstree toward Miami | Silver Meteor | Fayetteville toward New York |
Former services
| Preceding station | Atlantic Coast Line Railroad | Following station |
|---|---|---|
| Effingham toward Tampa | Main Line | Pee Dee toward Richmond |
| Darlington toward Wadesboro | Wadesboro – Florence | Terminus |
| Darlington toward Hartsville | Hartsville – Florence | Terminus |
| Timmonsville toward Augusta | Augusta – Florence | Terminus |
| Timmonsville toward Columbia | Columbia – Wilmington | Pee Dee toward Wilmington |
Location

Florence station is a train station in Florence, South Carolina, United States served by Amtrak. It is currently served by the Palmetto and Silver Meteor routes, and is a service stop for the Auto Train.

The station site contains two buildings. The original station was built by the Atlantic Coast Line Railroad (ACL) in 1910, serving as a junction between the Wilmington and Manchester Railroad, the Northeastern Railroad, the Cheraw and Darlington Railroad (all three of which were acquired by ACL) and the South Carolina Western Railway (which became part of the Seaboard Air Line Railroad). The current station was built in 1996. Both station buildings are owned by McLeod Health which uses the previous station as an office building for the hospital network. In 2018, Amtrak updated the signage at the station to be ADA compliant; additional improvements are to be finished in 2026 The station's platforms and tracks are owned by CSX Transportation.
