= Dillon station =

Passenger train station in Dillon, South Carolina

Dillon, SC
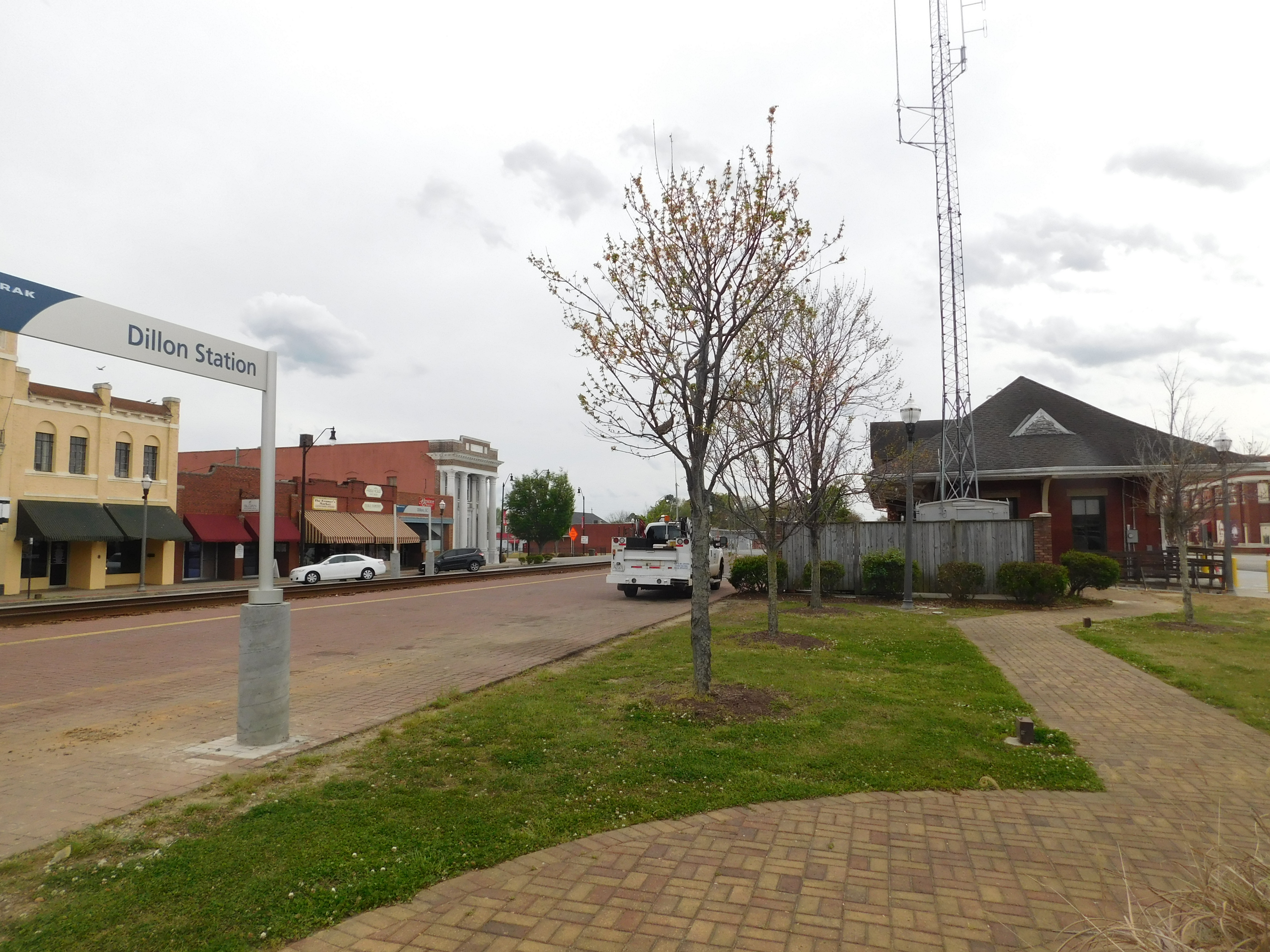
- Dillon station in April 2018.

General information
- Location: 100 North Railroad Avenue; Dillon, South Carolina; United States
- Coordinates: 34.4176°N 79.3722°W
- Owner: CSX Transportation
- Line: CSX South End Subdivision
- Platforms: 1 side platform
- Tracks: 1

Construction
- Parking: Yes
- Accessible: Yes

Other information
- Station code: Amtrak: DIL

History
- Opened: 1893 (Freight); 1904 (Passenger)

Passengers
- FY 2025: 7,117 (Amtrak)

Services
Preceding station	Amtrak	Following station
Florence toward Savannah	Palmetto	Fayetteville toward New York
Auto Train does not stop here
Silver Meteor does not stop here
Former services
Preceding station	Atlantic Coast Line Railroad	Following station
Latta toward Tampa	Main Line	Hamer toward Richmond
Location

Dillon station is a train station in Dillon, South Carolina, served by Amtrak, the United States' railroad passenger system. It was originally built by the Florence Railroad in 1893, but only as a freight station. Once the railroad was consolidated into the Atlantic Coast Line Railroad in 1898, the passenger station was opened in 1904. The station survived the merger of the Atlantic Coast Line and Seaboard Air Line Railroads into the Seaboard Coast Line Railroad in 1967, only to terminate passenger service in 1971. Amtrak service to Dillon began on June 15, 1976, with the introduction of the Palmetto. The four-faced station clock also contains two Fahrenheit thermometers.

== Gallery ==
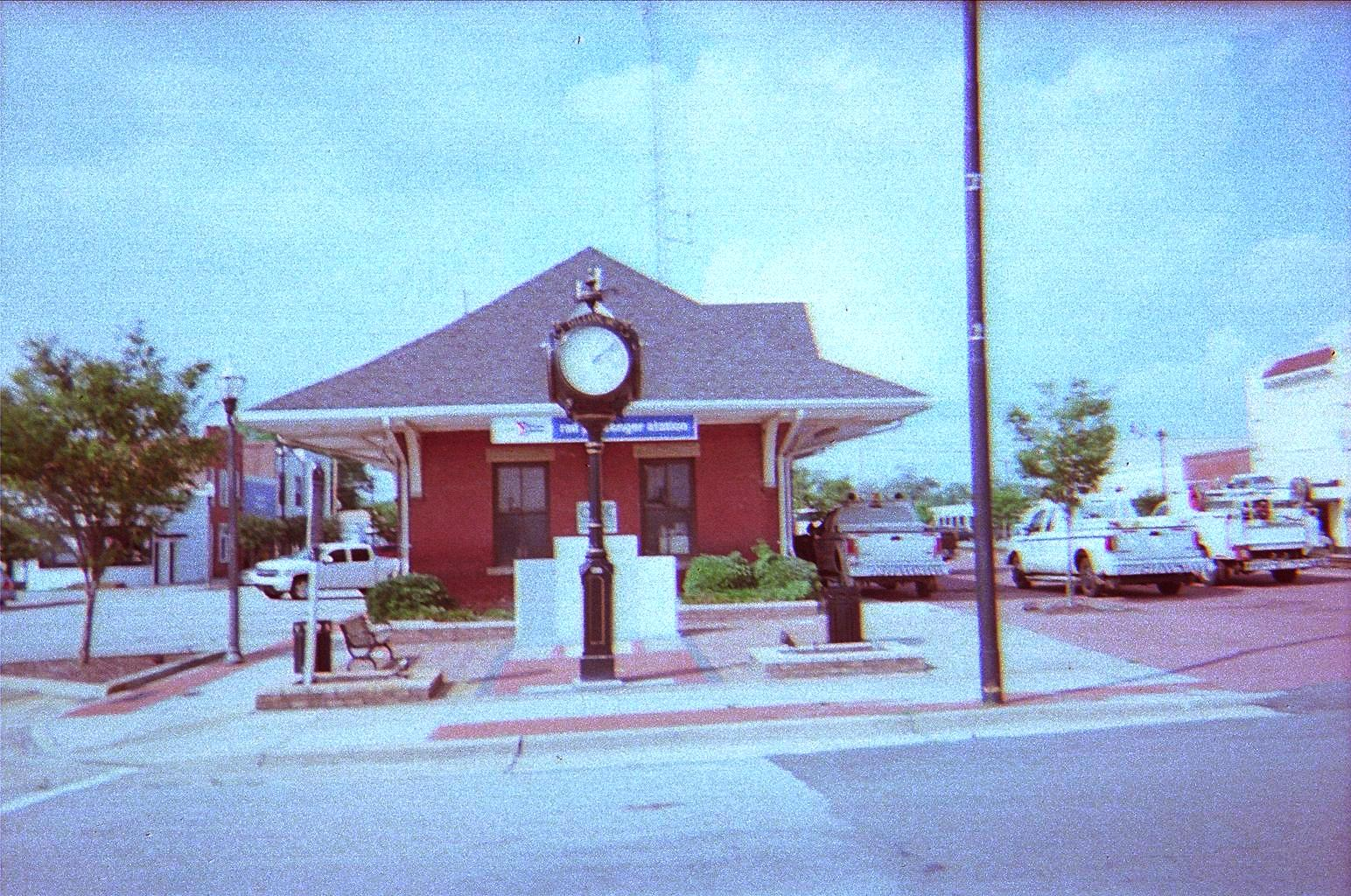
The clock doubles as a thermometer

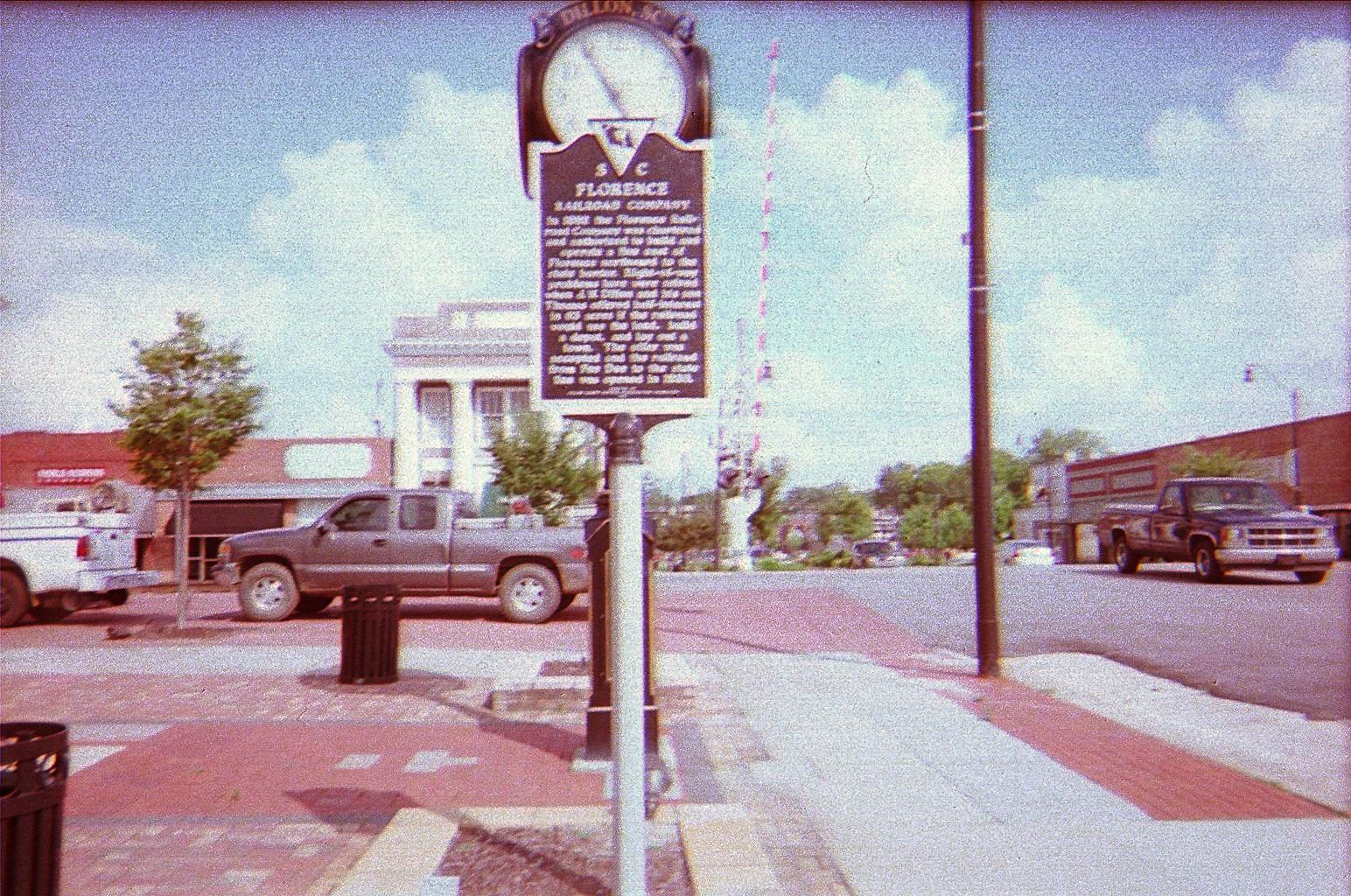
Historic plaque

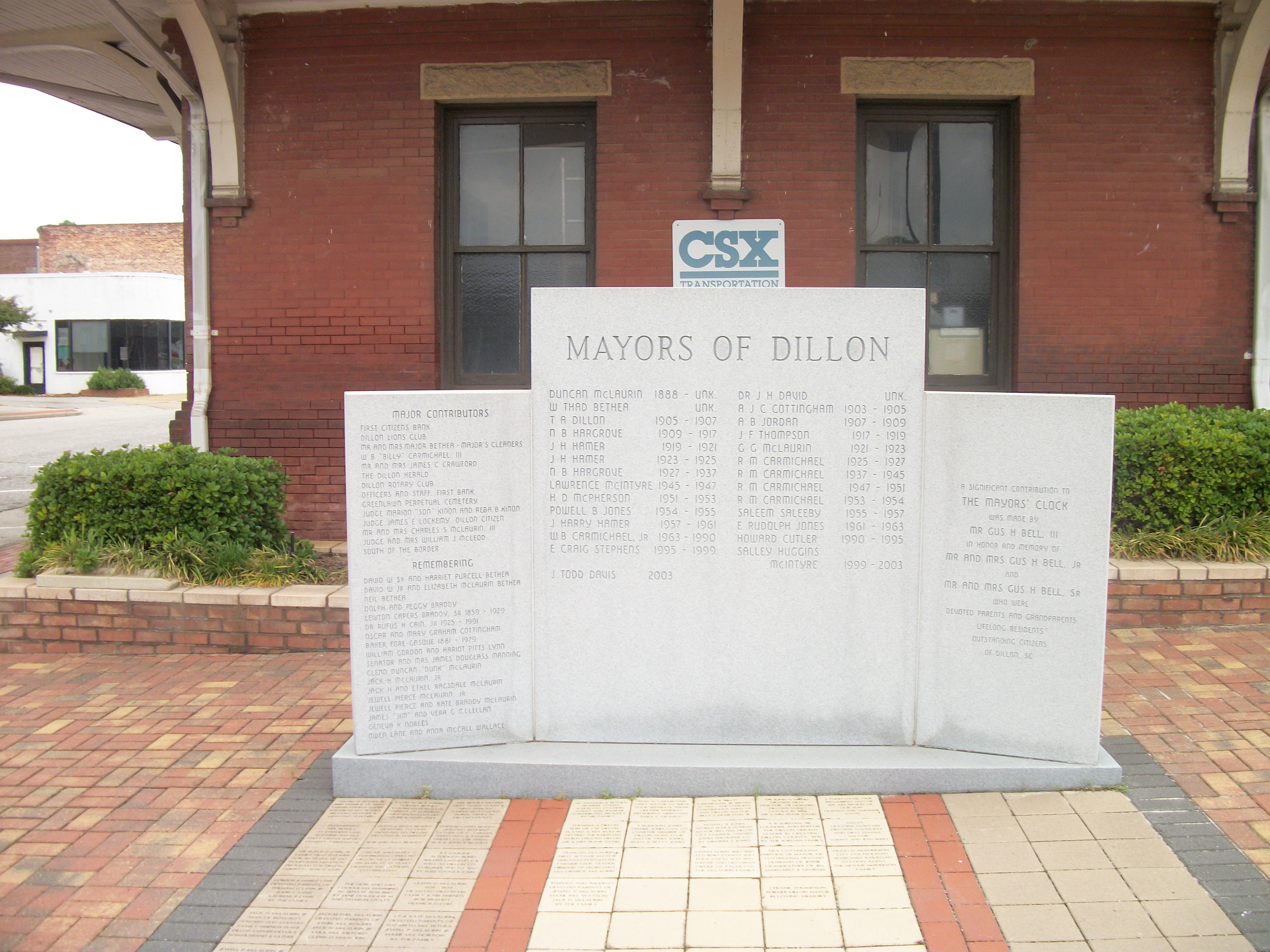
Monument to the Mayors of Dillon

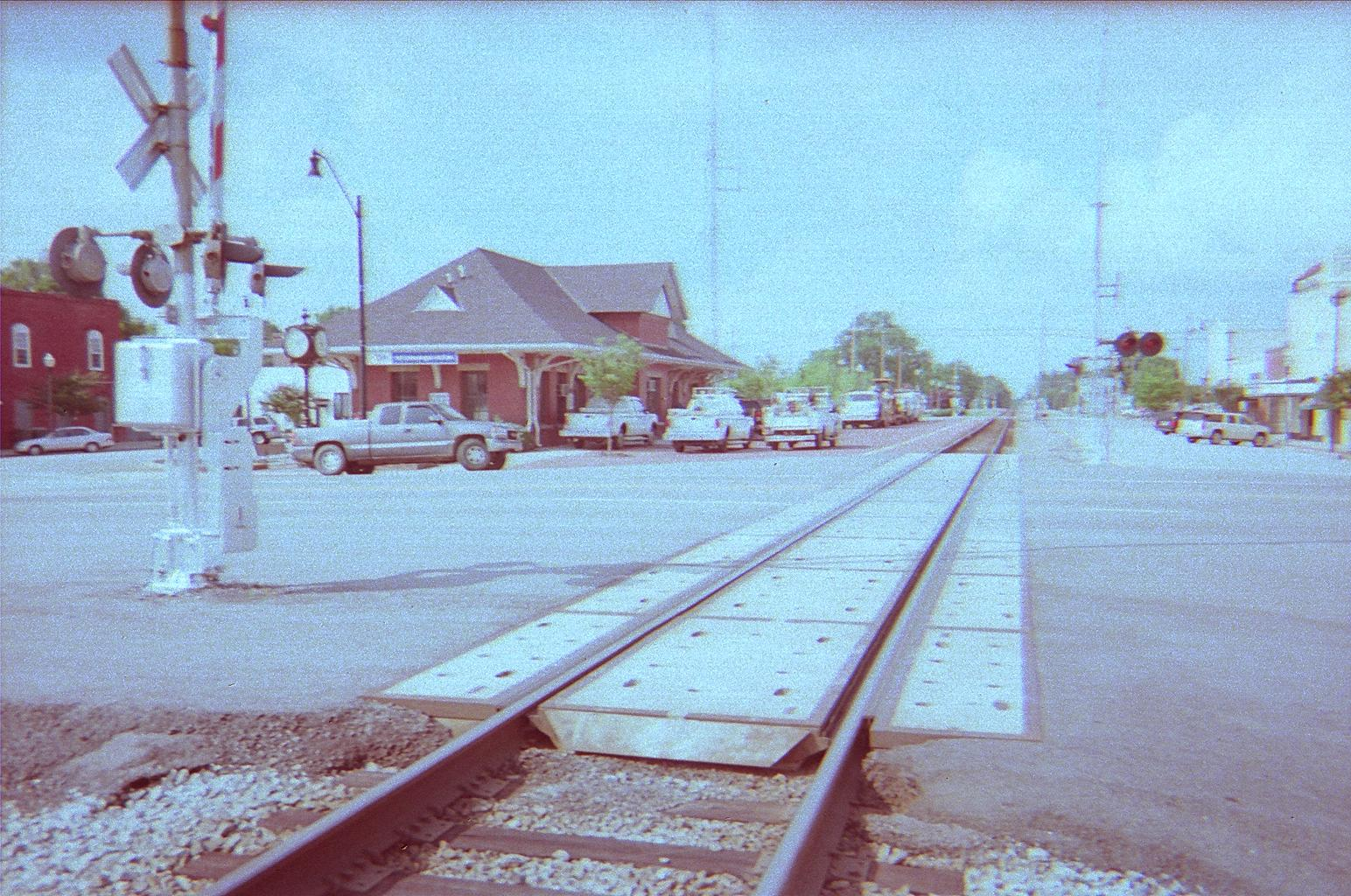
Railroad crossing and CSX Railroad trucks
