= A.M. Griffin =

American architect (1885–1954)

- Born: Alpheus Marston Griffin; March 2, 1885; Nashville, Tennessee, U.S.
- Died: August 6, 1954 (aged 69); Nashville, Tennessee, U.S.
- Education: Vanderbilt Peabody College of Education and Human Development
- Occupation: Architect
- Spouse: Icie Pugh (m. 1908)
- Children: 5

Alpheus Marston Griffin, (March 2, 1885 – August 6, 1954) was an American architect who worked as a staff architect for the Atlantic Coast Line Railroad in the 1920s.

Griffin was educated at Peabody College. He worked as an architect for the Nashville Interurban Railway beginning in 1908, then as an assistant engineer, assistant architect, and finally architect for the Nashville, Chattanooga & St. Louis Railway between 1909 and 1917. He served as a 1st Lieutenant of Engineers in the United States Army in 1918 and 1919. He then began working for the Atlantic Coast Line in December, 1919. Griffin was a member of American Railway Association's Committee VI Buildings in 1921. The railroad sent Griffin to the American southwest in the mid 1920s to study Spanish missions such as those in Santa Barbara and San Juan Capistrano before he designed the Mission Revival style stations in Sarasota and Orlando. Griffin designed each letter of the Orlando station sign. At least three of the stations Griffin designed are listed on the National Register of Historic Places.

Griffin was born in Nashville, Tennessee, on March 2, 1885. He married Icie Pugh in 1908, and they had five children, Douglas Winston, Ice Ruth, Roberta, Elsie Carol, and Alpheus Jr.

Griffin died August 6, 1954, in Nashville.

== Works ==
- Freight station, Bishopville, South Carolina (1921)
- Hospital, South Rocky Mount, North Carolina (1921)
- Freight terminal, Richmond, Virginia (1922)
- Station, Peck Street, Fort Myers, Florida (1924)
- Wilson station (North Carolina), 401 East Nash Street, Wilson, North Carolina (1924), Flemish style, NRHP 84003876
- Union Depot, 500 East Railroad Street, Selma, North Carolina (1924), Atlantic Coast Line Railroad and Southern Railway, NRHP 82003482
- Atlantic Coast Line Depot, 1 South School Avenue, Sarasota, Florida (1925), Mission Revival style NRHP 84000957, demolished January 1986
- Orlando Health/Amtrak station, 1400 Sligh Boulevard, Orlando, Florida (1926), Mission Revival style

== Gallery ==
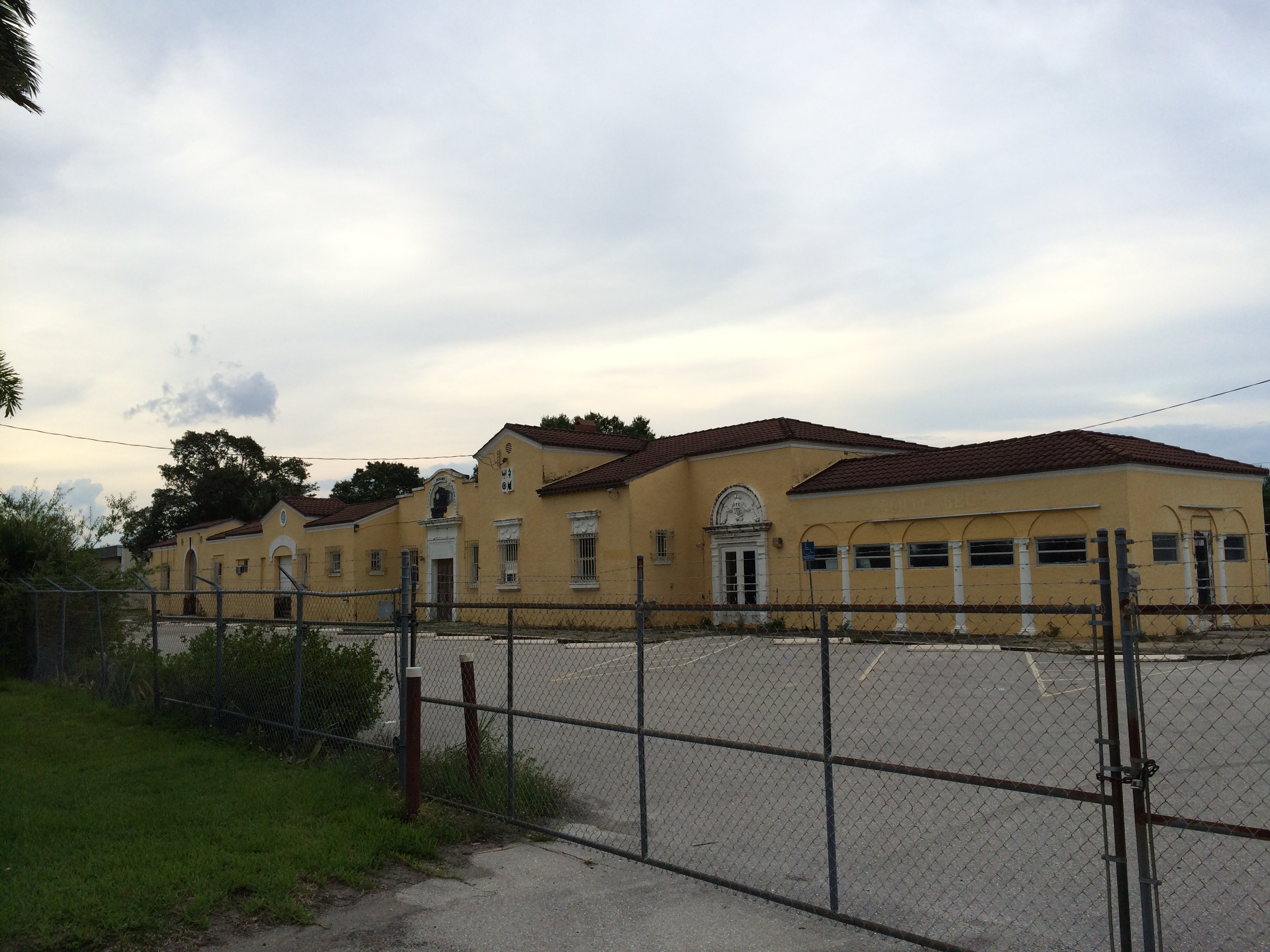
Fort Myers Station

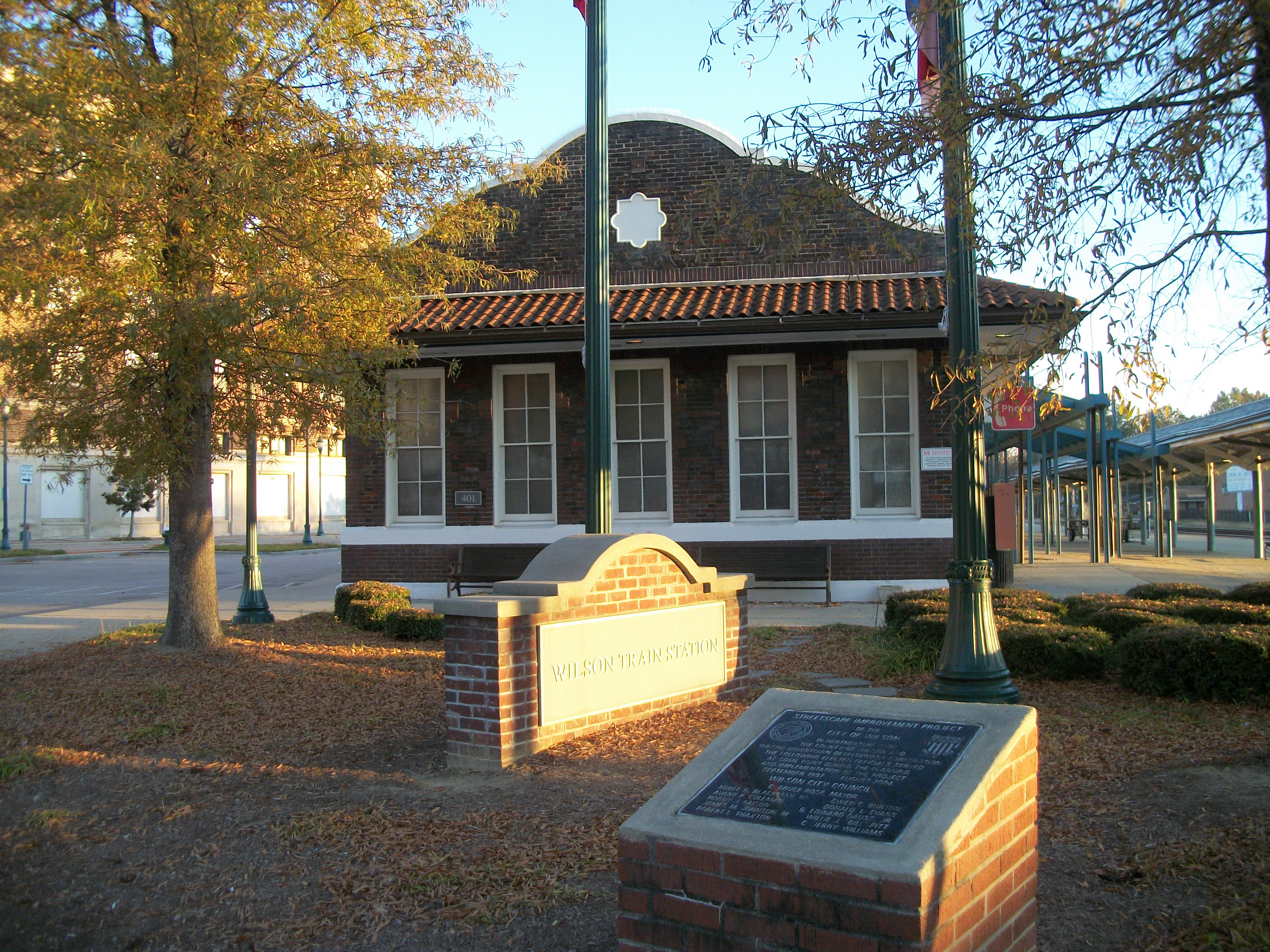
Wilson Station

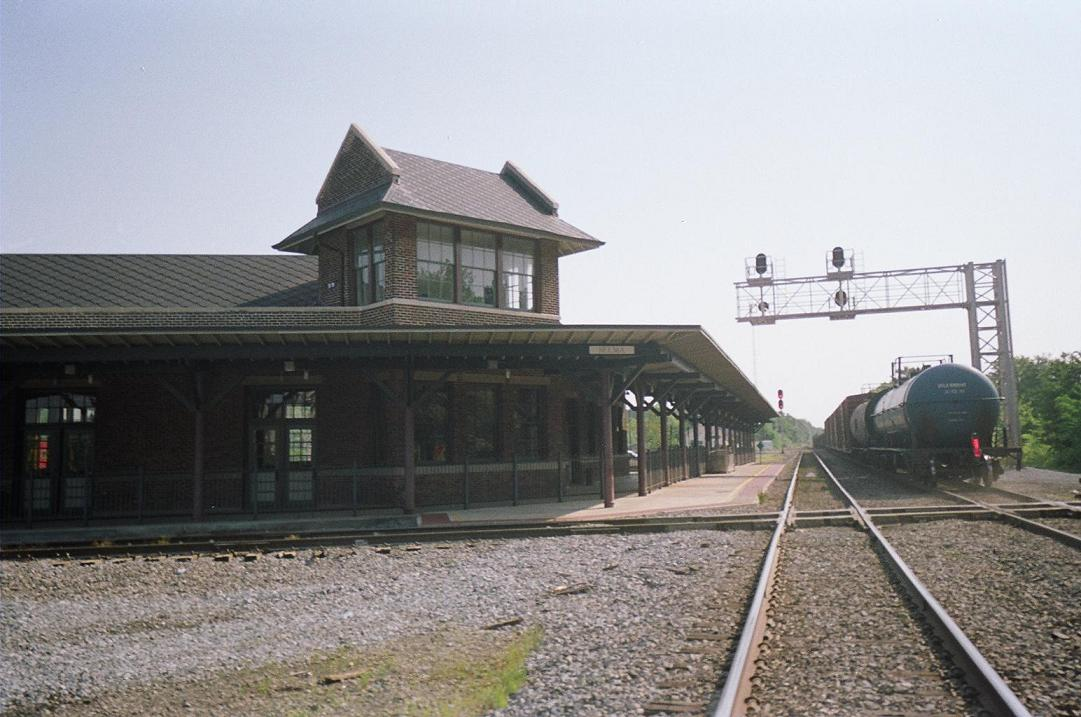
Selma Union Depot

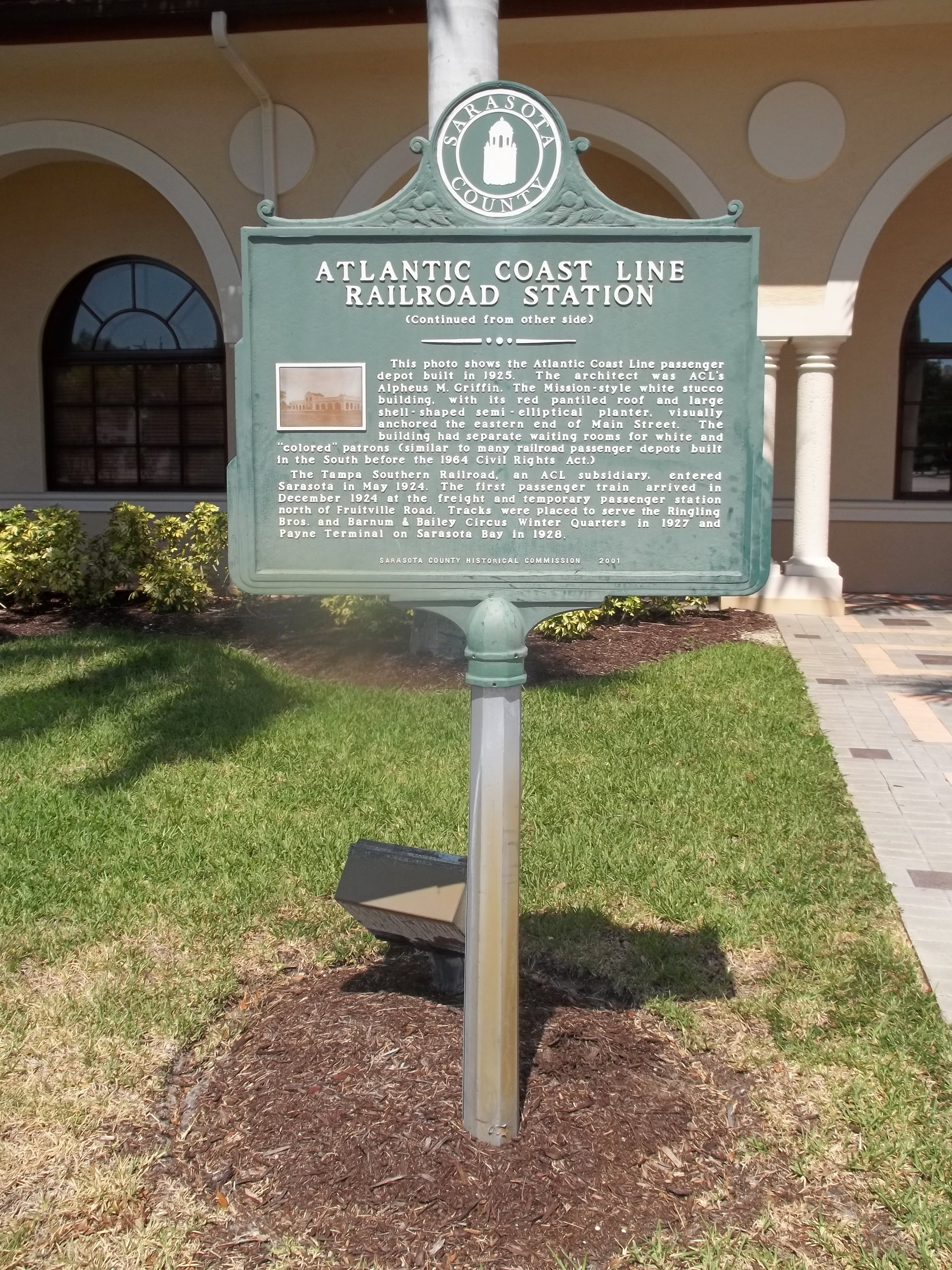
Sarasota Depot site historical marker

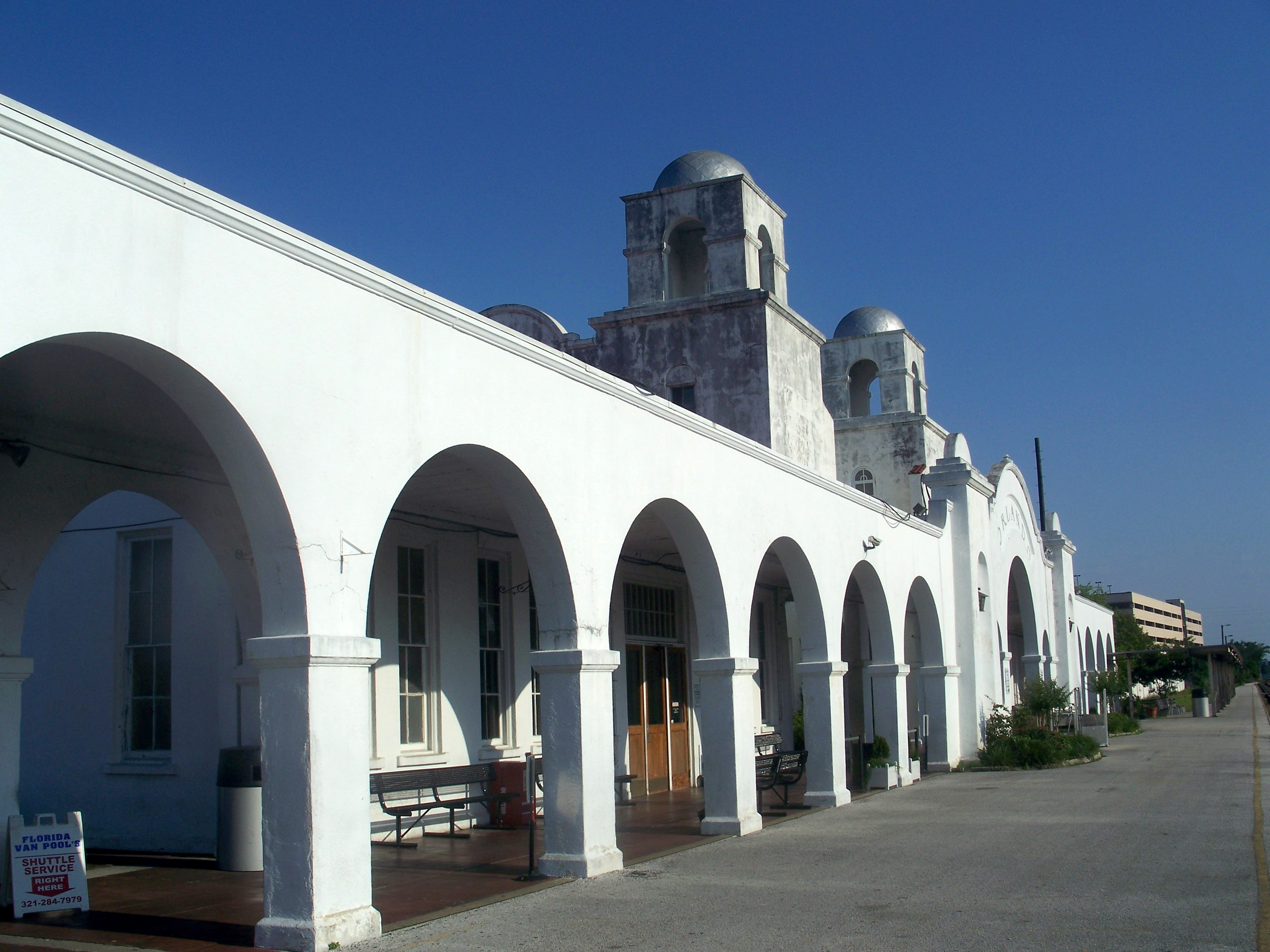
Orlando Station

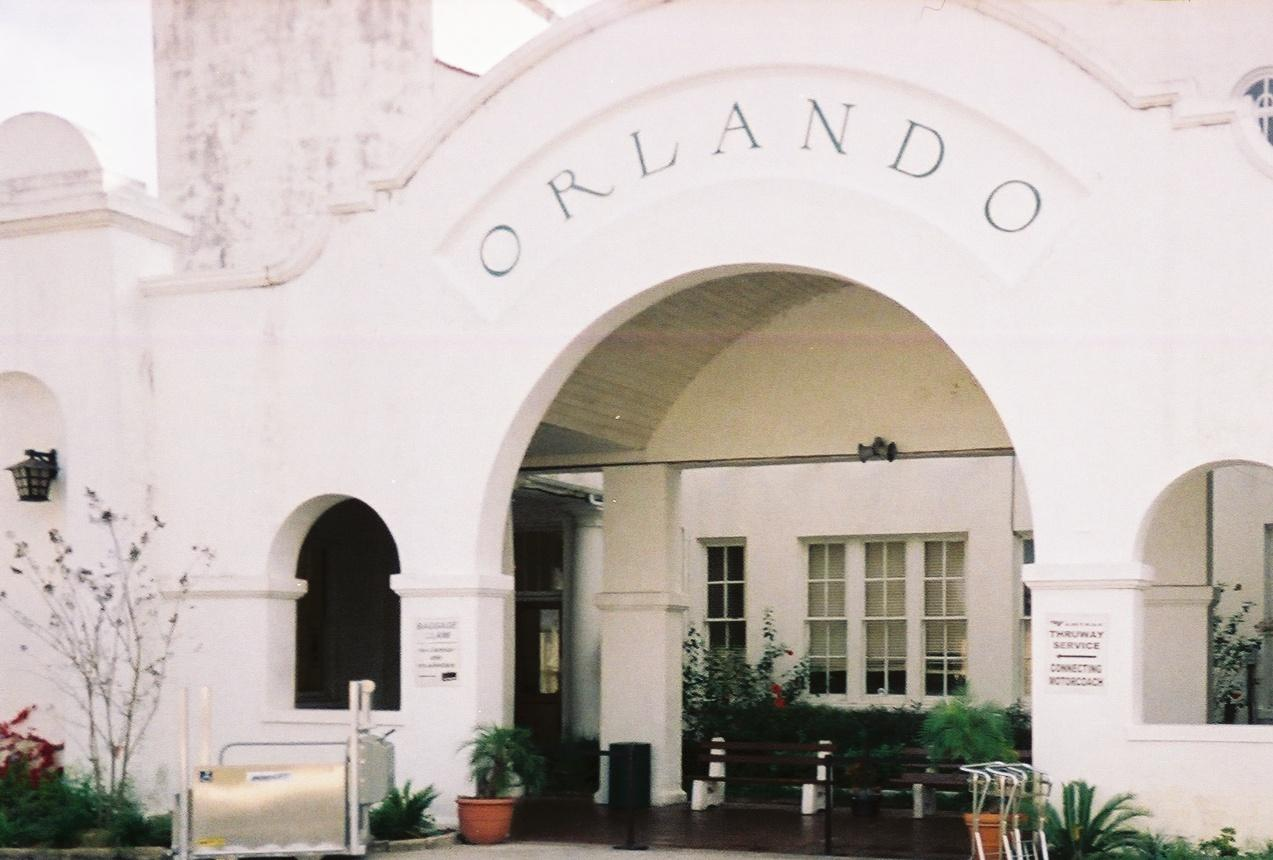
Lettering of the Orlando station
