= Smithfield and Goldsboro Railroad =

Historic railroad in North Carolina

Overview
- Dates of operation: 1883–1885
- Successor: Wilmington and Weldon Railroad; Atlantic Coast Line Railroad

Technical
- Track gauge: 4 ft 8 1/2 in (1,435 mm) standard gauge
- Length: 22.8 miles (36.7 km)

The Smithfield and Goldsboro Railroad was a railroad built in the late 1800s running from Smithfield, North Carolina east to Goldsboro, North Carolina. It was acquired by the Wilmington and Weldon Railroad network and later became part of the Atlantic Coast Line Railroad network.

== History ==
The Smithfield and Goldsboro Railroad was chartered in 1881. It was the first and only railroad built by its parent company, the Midland North Carolina Railroad. The Smithfield and Goldsboro Railroad began operations between its namesake cities in 1883. In Goldsboro, it connected to the Wilmington and Weldon Railroad and the Atlantic and North Carolina Railroad (the latter was briefly leased by Midland North Carolina Railroad). The branch closely paralleled the North Carolina Railroad (which was operated by the Southern Railway).

The Midland North Carolina Railroad was acquired by the Wilmington and Weldon Railroad in 1885, which included the Smithfield and Goldsboro Railroad. The Wilmington and Weldon Railroad would designate the line as their Midland Branch (named for the Midland North Carolina Railroad). By 1899, the Wilmington and Weldon Railroad was fully incorporated into the Atlantic Coast Line Railroad network.

Atlantic Coast Line abandoned the Midland Branch in 1930.

== Historic stations ==
Miles from Goldsboro	City/Location	Station	Connections and notes
0.0	Goldsboro	Goldsboro	located on Wilmington and Weldon Railroad
1.0	Goldsboro	Midland Junction	junction with: Wilmington and Weldon Railroad (ACL); North Carolina Railroad (SOU); Atlantic and North Carolina Railroad (NS)
4.6		Walter	
10.0	Princeton	Princeton	
10.7		Joyner	
12.0		Holt's Mill	
17.3		Peeden	
18.0		Oliver	
22.8	Smithfield	Smithfield	junction with Wilson & Fayetteville Railroad (ACL)
