= Selma Union Depot =

Train station in Selma, North Carolina

Selma, NC
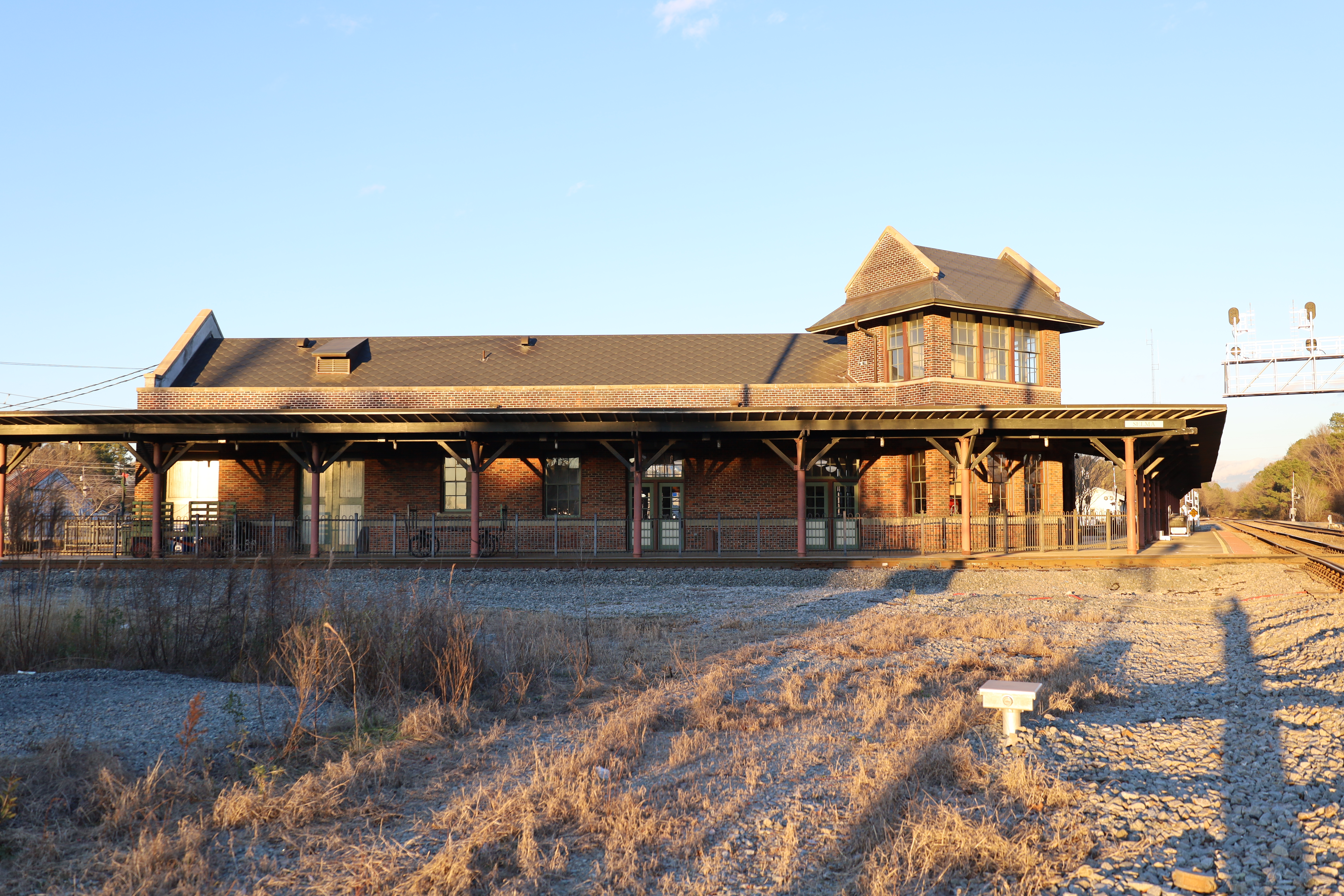

General information
- Location: 500 East Railroad Street; Selma, North Carolina; United States
- Coordinates: 35°31′58″N 78°16′48″W
- Owner: Town of Selma
- Lines: NCRR Corridor; South End Subdivision
- Platforms: 3 side platforms (2 used)
- Tracks: 3

Construction
- Structure type: At-grade
- Parking: 20 spaces
- Accessible: Yes
- Architect: A.M. Griffin (1924); Barry Rakes (2002)

Other information
- Status: Unstaffed; attendant available
- Station code: Amtrak: SSM

History
- Opened: 1867
- Rebuilt: 1924, 2002

Passengers
- FY 2025: 17,698 (Amtrak)

Services
Preceding station	Amtrak	Following station
Raleigh toward Charlotte	Carolinian	Wilson toward New York
Fayetteville toward Savannah	Palmetto	Wilson toward New York
Auto Train does not stop here
Floridian does not stop here
Silver Meteor does not stop here
Former services
Preceding station	Atlantic Coast Line Railroad	Following station
Smithfield toward Tampa	Main Line	Micro toward Richmond
Preceding station	Southern Railway	Following station
Wilson's Mills toward North Wilkesboro	North Wilkesboro – Morehead City	Pine Level toward Morehead City
- Selma Union Station
- U.S. National Register of Historic Places
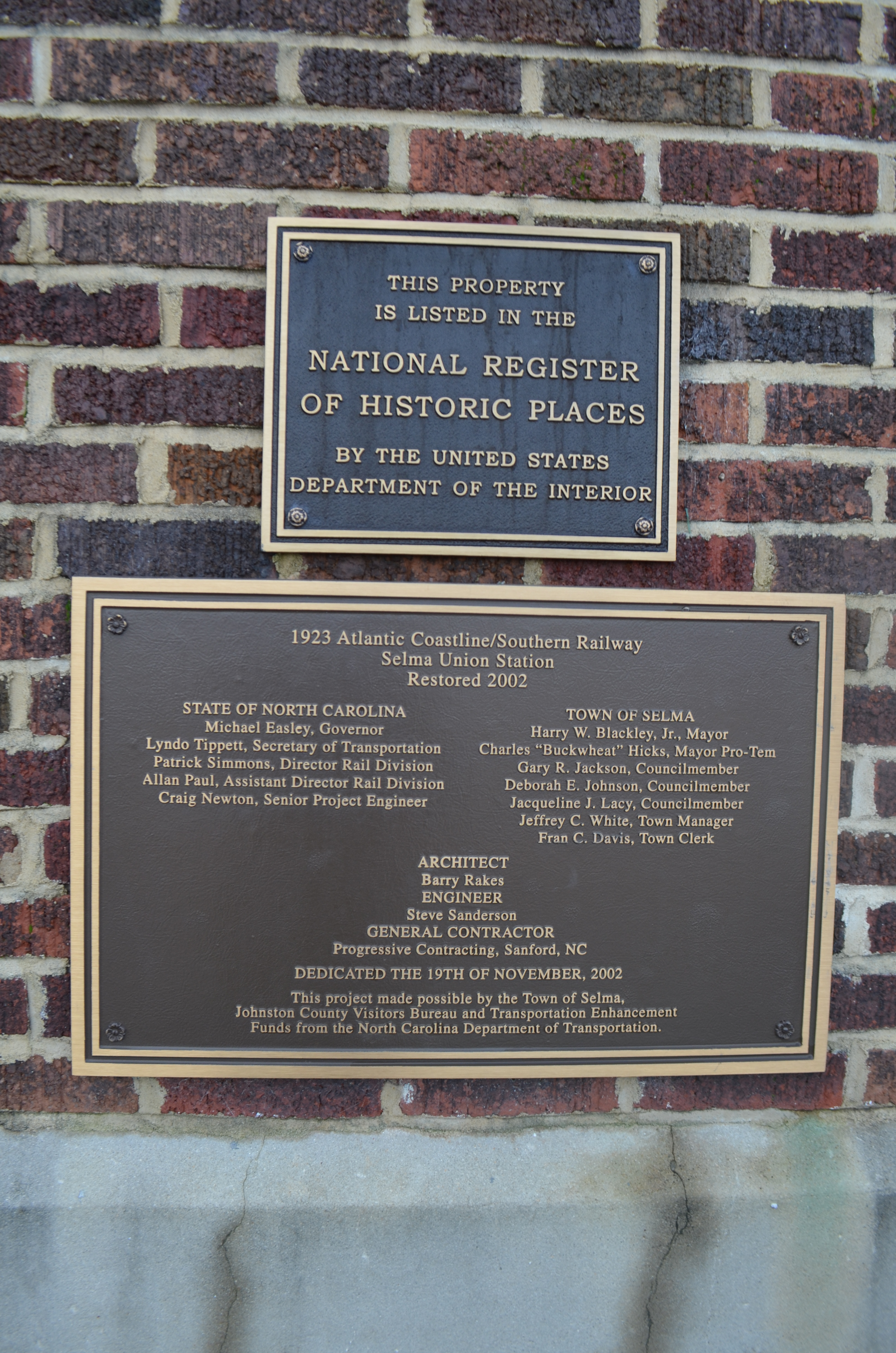
- Plaques for the depot's NRHP status and 2002 restoration.
- Location: E. Railroad St., Selma, North Carolina
- Built: 19 July 1924
- Architect: Griffin, A.M.
- MPS: Selma, North Carolina MRA
- NRHP reference No.: 82003482
- Added to NRHP: June 24, 1982
Location

Selma Union Depot, also known as Selma Union Station and Selma–Smithfield, is a train station and museum in Selma, North Carolina, and near the town of Smithfield. Built in 1924, it is currently served by two Amtrak passenger trains, the Palmetto and the Carolinian. It is located at 500 East Railroad Street in the heart of downtown Selma. The Floridian and the Silver Meteor have their northern split here, but do not stop in Selma.

== History ==
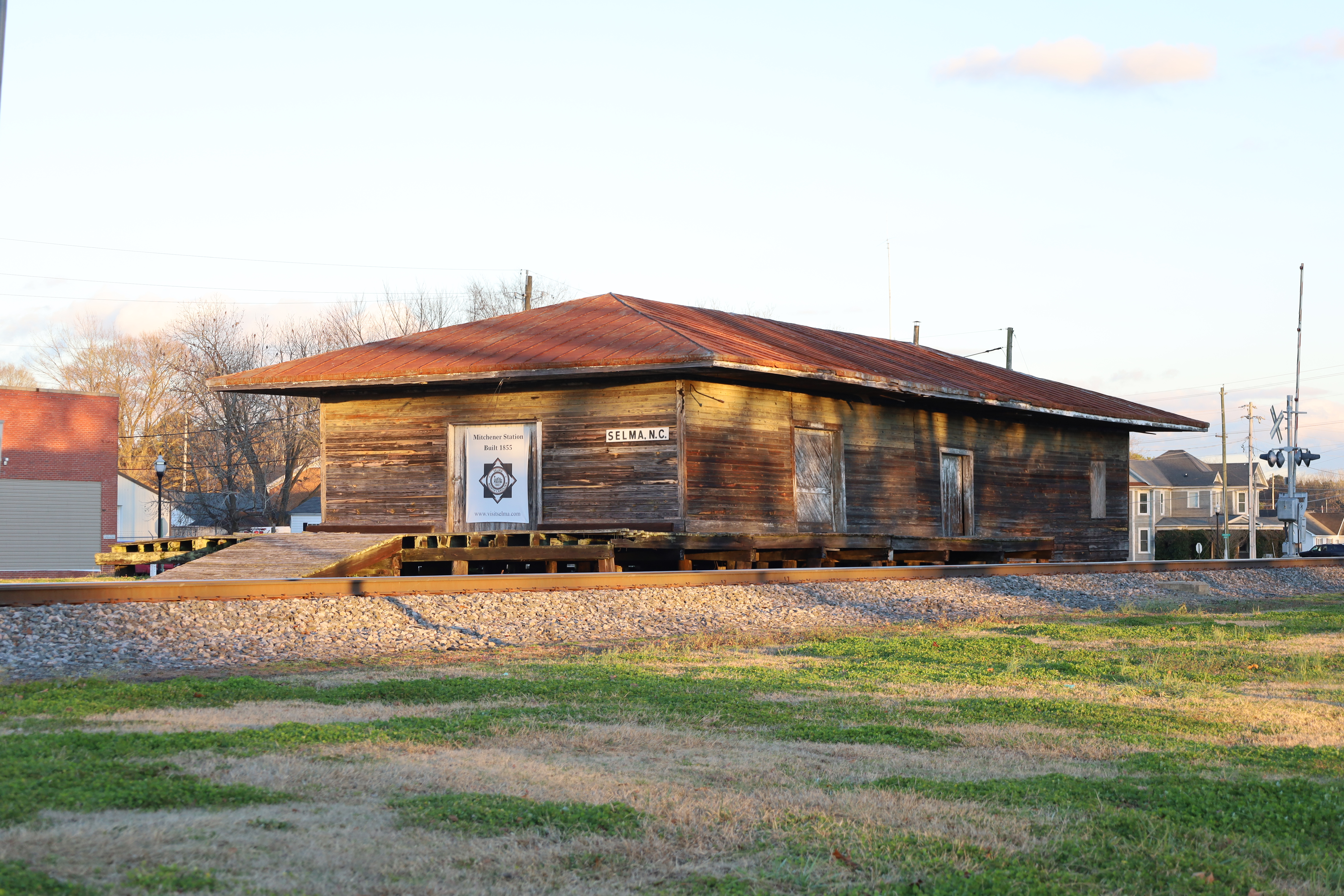
Mitchener station was the predecessor to the current station

The original station in the area was the Mitchner station, built in 1855 a few blocks from the current station. The building still exists and is believed to be the oldest surviving train station in North Carolina.

A wood-frame structure at the current site was constructed in 1897. The current station was built as its replacement in 1924 by architect A.M. Griffin, for the Atlantic Coast Line and Southern Railroads. The ACL trains were north–south for the company's Everglades and Palmetto. The Southern Railway trains were east–west trains on the North Carolina section of the Carolina Special.

The station was closed in 1971, when Amtrak took over passenger service throughout much of the country. In 1975, the people of the city thwarted the station's demolition, and beginning the year after this reopened the station as a museum devoted to the city's railroad heritage. It was added to the National Register of Historic Places on June 24, 1982. Amtrak service to Selma began on October 31, 1982, when the Palmetto began stopping there. In February 2024, Amtrak completed the $2.5 million project, with upgrades that makes the station fully compliant to the Americans with Disabilities Act.

== Layout ==
The old freight house is located to the west of the station on Railroad Street and South Webb Avenue. A maintenance shed is located to the north. Two tracks exist along the east side of the station, another one exists along the south side, and the fourth is a section of curved track behind the station that connects two of the tracks. Three platforms exist at the station, one of which is along the curved track. A parking space exclusively for the handicapped can be found between the curve and the station house.

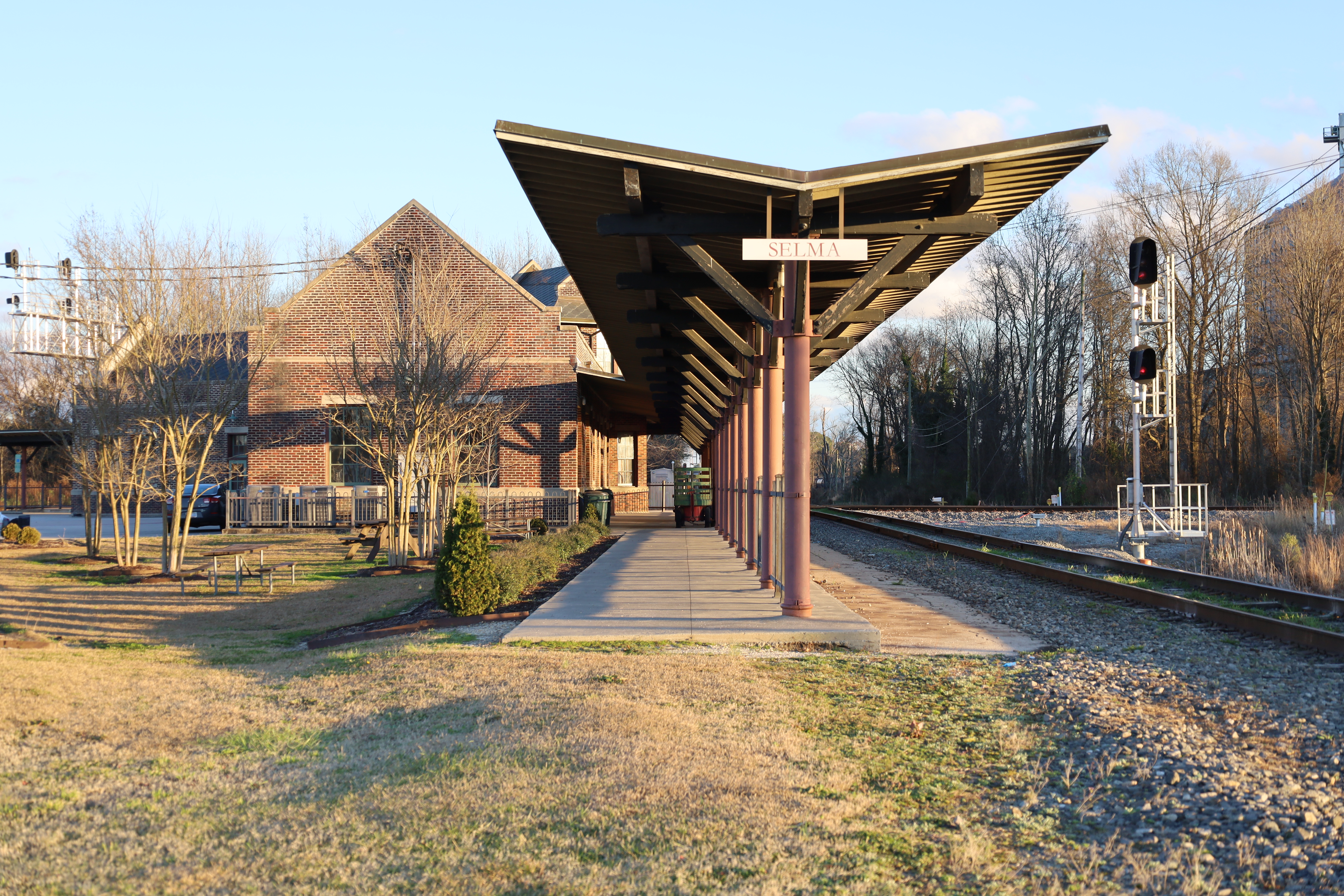
Historic boarding shelter

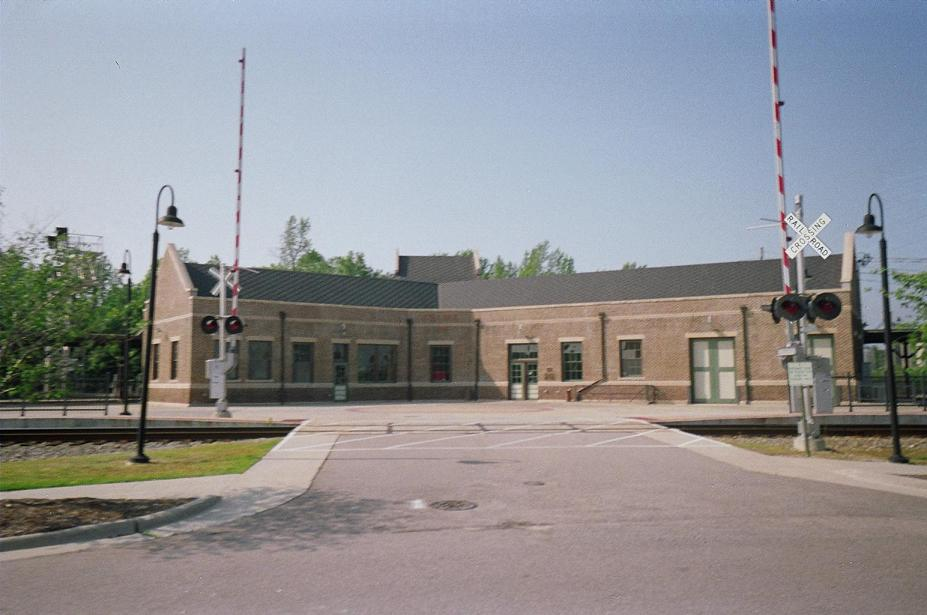
Rear of the station

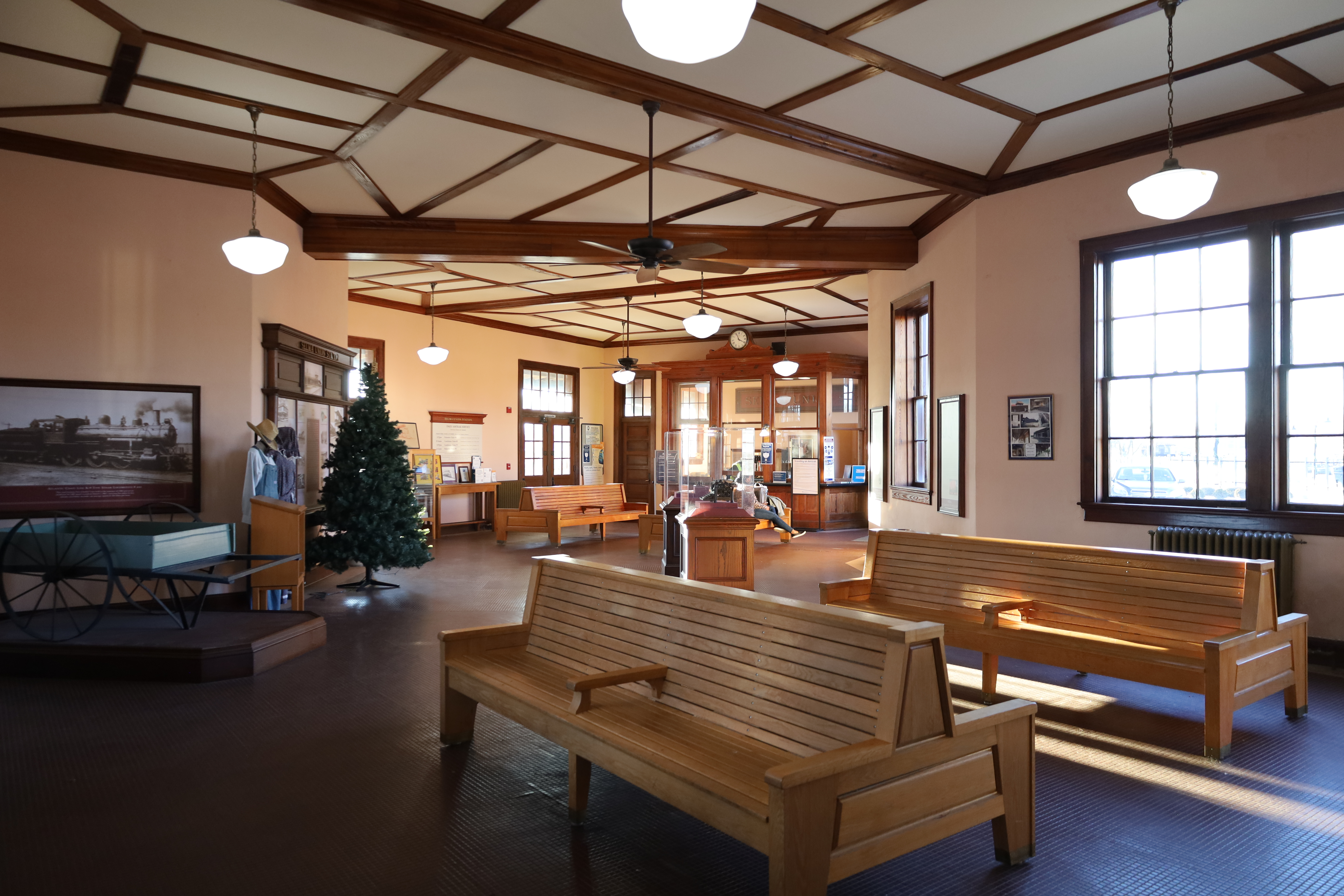
Station interior

== Routes ==
- Carolinian
- Palmetto
