= Fayetteville station =

Passenger train station in Fayetteville, North Carolina

Fayetteville, NC
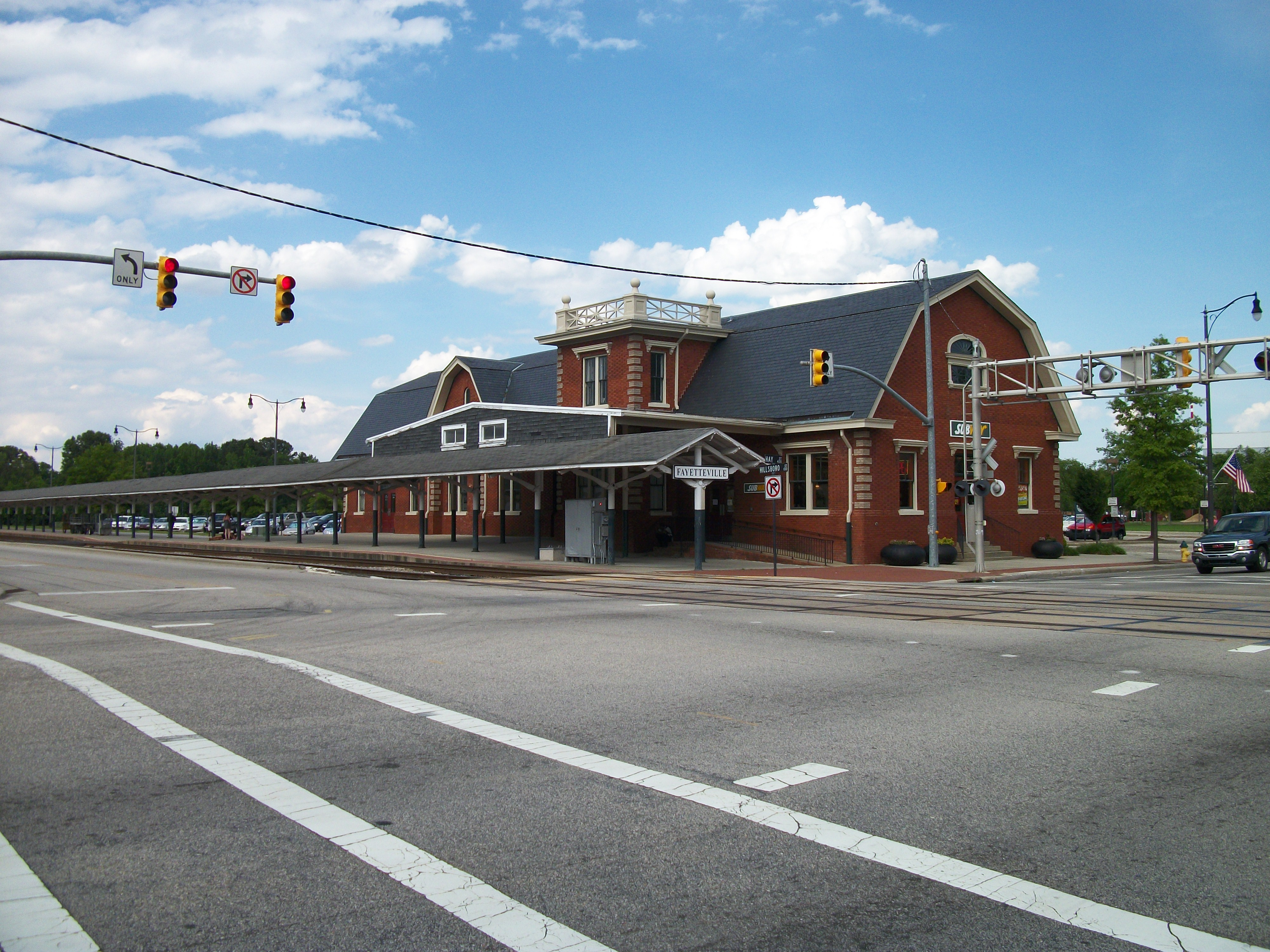
- Historic station on the corner of Hay and Winslow streets

General information
- Location: 472 Hay Street; Fayetteville, North Carolina; United States
- Coordinates: 35°03′18″N 78°53′05″W
- Owner: City of Fayetteville
- Line: South End Subdivision
- Platforms: 1 side platform
- Tracks: 1

Construction
- Structure type: At-grade
- Parking: Yes; free
- Accessible: Yes
- Architect: Joseph F. Leitner
- Architectural style: Dutch Colonial Revival

Other information
- Station code: Amtrak: FAY

History
- Opened: 1911
- Rebuilt: 2005–2006
- Original company: Atlantic Coast Line Railroad

Passengers
- FY 2025: 57,742 (Amtrak)

Services
Preceding station	Amtrak	Following station
Dillon toward Savannah	Palmetto	Selma toward New York
Florence toward Miami	Silver Meteor	Rocky Mount toward New York
Auto Train does not stop here
Former services
Preceding station	Atlantic Coast Line Railroad	Following station
Hope Mills toward Tampa	Main Line	Wade toward Richmond
Fort Bragg toward Mount Airy	Sanford Branch after 1911	Vander toward Wilmington
- Atlantic Coast Line Railroad Station
- U.S. National Register of Historic Places
- NRHP reference No.: 82001294
- Added to NRHP: July 7, 1982
Location
- Location within North Carolina

Fayetteville station is an Amtrak train station in Fayetteville, North Carolina, United States. It is located in the Fayetteville Downtown Historic District, next to the Airborne & Special Operations Museum.

== History ==
The station was originally built in 1911 by the Atlantic Coast Line Railroad, designed by architect Joseph F. Leitner, and was the third station to be located at the corner of Hay and Hillsborough Streets.

In addition to serving the north-south ACL main line, into the late 1930s, the station afforded connection with a line to Mt. Airy via Sanford and Greensboro to the northwest, and another train to Wilmington to the southeast.

The station has been listed on the National Register of Historic Places since July 7, 1982. Between 2005 and 2006, the station was restored in an effort to bring it up to compliance with the Americans with Disabilities Act of 1990.

== Services ==
The station, operated by Amtrak, provides inter-city rail service via two routes: Palmetto and Silver Meteor. (The Auto Train passes through nightly but does not make a stop.) The facility is open daily from 10:00am-5:45pm and 10:00pm-5:45am, which includes the ticket office, passenger assistance, baggage service and waiting area. A Subway restaurant is also located in the facility.

Because of construction of a new baseball stadium, hotel and parking deck, parking for the station is temporarily located behind the Airborne & Special Operations Museum. When construction is completed, pay parking will only be available via the parking deck.

Located one block south, along Winslow Street, is the FAST Center, providing local and intercity bus services.
