= PDRTA (South Carolina) =

Transit agency in northeast South Carolina

Pee Dee Regional Transportation Authority
- Founded: 1974
- Headquarters: 313 Stadium Road
- Locale: Florence, South Carolina
- Service area: Pee Dee Region
- Service type: Bus service, Paratransit
- Routes: 8
- Website: pdrta.org

The Pee Dee Regional Transportation Authority or PDRTA is the primary provider of mass transportation in a six county region of northeastern South Carolina. The agency was established in 1974 as the state's first public transit agency that was managed by a multi-county board instead of a single municipality. Originally, the bureau's duty was to provide demand response service for qualified workers, but in 1988, the first fixed routes were established in Florence. Currently, six routes run through the urban areas of that city, and in March 2010, service expanded from weekday-only to Monday through Saturday.

In addition to the urban routes, the agency offers two lines in other areas of its jurisdiction. A weekday commuter route connects Lake City with Myrtle Beach. In 2008, the PDRTA instituted a fixed route line for several small Marlboro County cities.

== Routes ==
- 1 West Evans-Magnolia Mall
- 2 North Florence
- 3 South Florence-East Florence
- 4 Second Street Loop-DSS Building
- 5 Palmetto Street-Florence Mall
- 6 South Florence-Savannah Grove
- 125 Chesterfield-Cheraw-Bennettsville
- 912 Lake City-Myrtle Beach
