= South End Subdivision =

Railway line in North Carolina and South Carolina

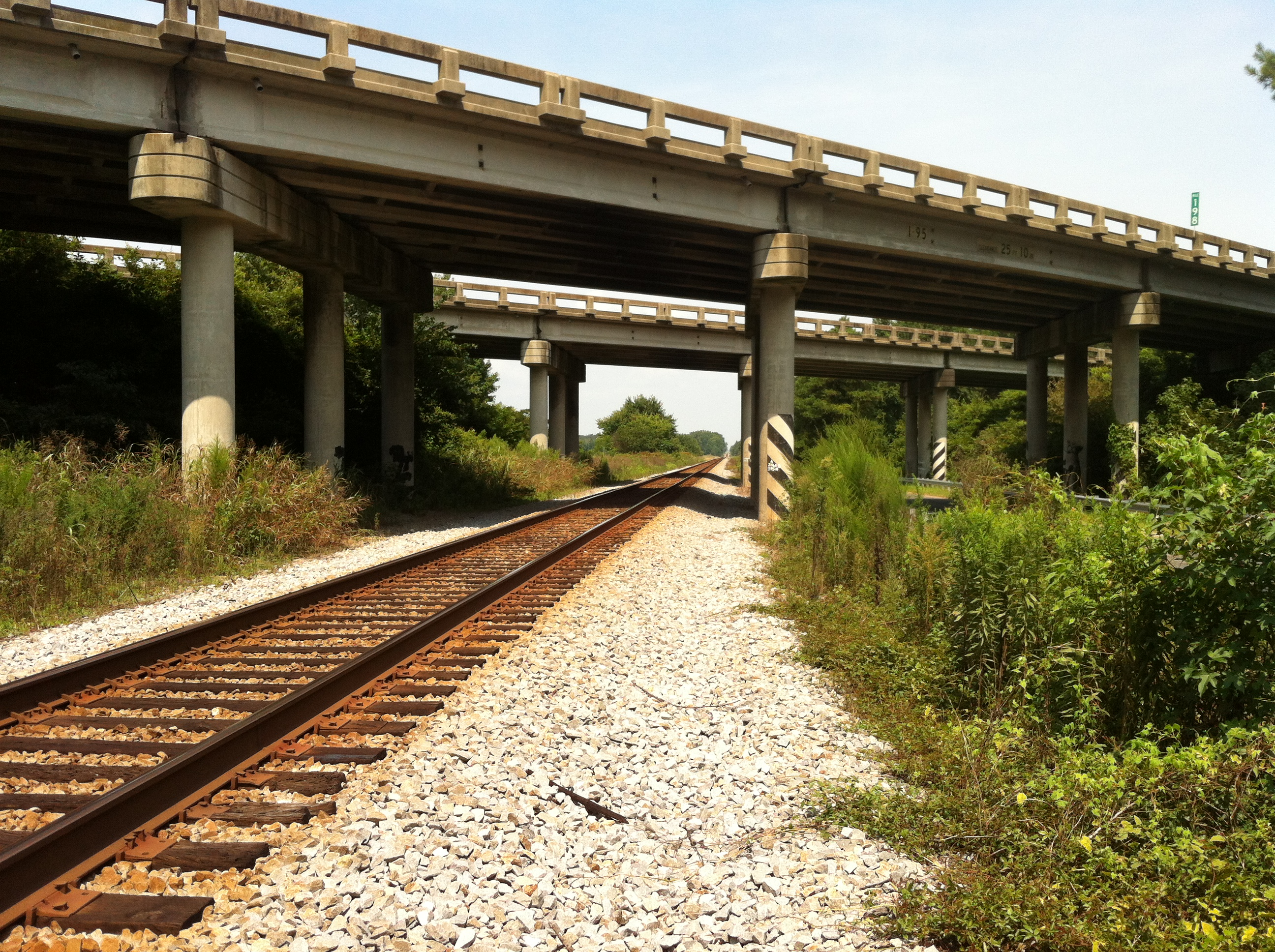
The South End Subdivision as it goes under Interstate 95 in Dillon County, South Carolina.

The South End Subdivision is a railroad line owned by CSX Transportation in the U.S. states of North Carolina and South Carolina. The line runs from Rocky Mount, North Carolina, to Florence, South Carolina, for a total of 172.8 miles (278.1 km). At its north end the line continues south from the North End Subdivision and at its south end the line continues south as the Charleston Subdivision. The South End Subdivision is a part of CSX's A Line, one of their mainline which ultimately extends from Richmond, Virginia to Tampa, Florida.

== History ==
The South End Subdivision is made up of various historical railroads. It was originally the Wilmington and Weldon Railroad, chartered in 1835 (191 years ago), from Rocky Mount, North Carolina to Wilson, North Carolina. From Wilson to Pee Dee, South Carolina, it was built as the Fayetteville Cutoff, which opened gradually from 1886 to 1892. From Pee Dee to Florence, it was part of the Wilmington and Manchester Railroad, which began operation in 1853.

These railroads all eventually became part of the Atlantic Coast Line Railroad. The Atlantic Coast Line and Seaboard Air Line merged in 1967, with the merged company becoming CSX by 1986 (40 years ago).

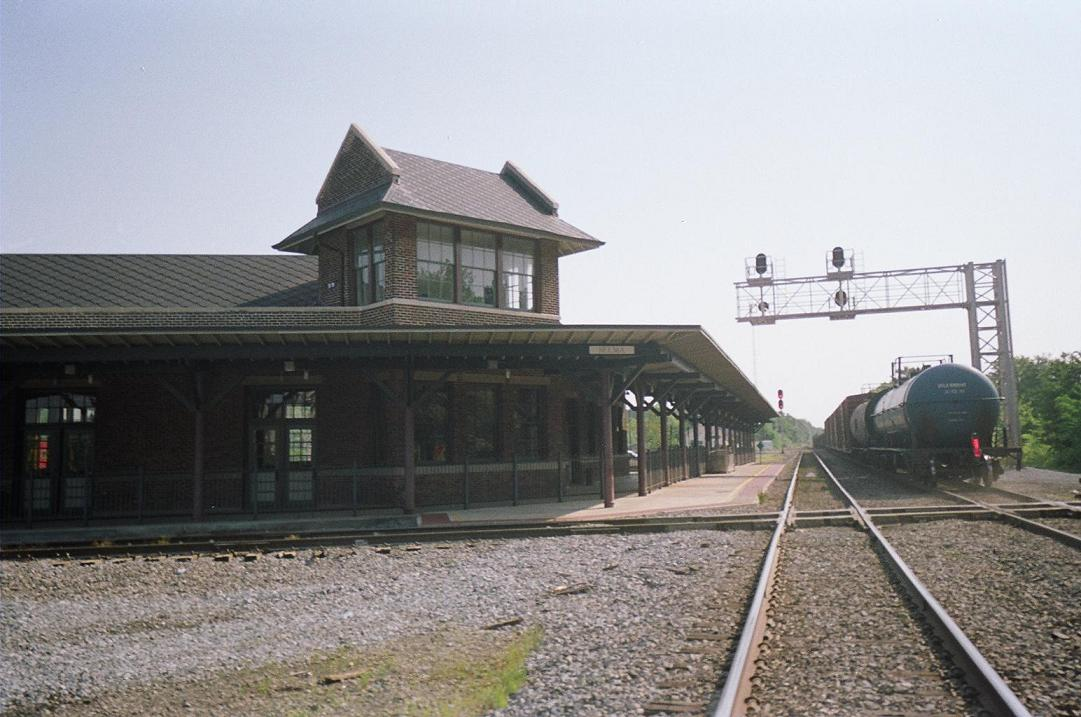
CSX Freight train heads north on the South End Subdivision as it crosses a Norfolk Southern Railway line at the historic Selma Union Depot.

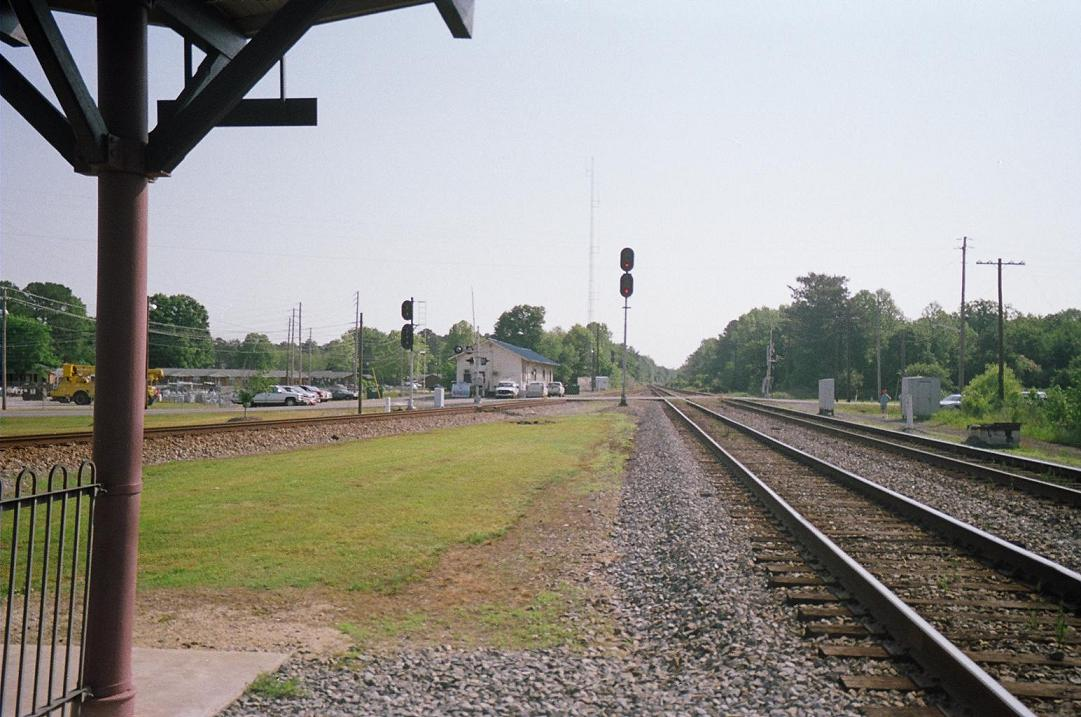
Track from Selma north

== See also ==
- List of CSX Transportation lines
