= Myrtle Beach Branch =

Atlantic Coast Line Railroad branch in North Carolina and South Carolina

Overview
- Status: Some segments are still operating
- Owner: Atlantic Coast Line Railroad
- Locale: North Carolina; South Carolina

Technical
- Track gauge: 1,435 mm (4 ft 8 1/2 in) standard gauge
- Electrification: No
- Signalling: None

The Atlantic Coast Line Railroad's Myrtle Beach Branch was a railroad line that at its greatest extent ran from company's main line in Elrod, North Carolina south to Myrtle Beach, South Carolina. The Atlantic Coast Line used the branch for freight and transport passengers to Myrtle Beach, which was becoming a popular tourist destination.

== Route description ==
At its greatest extent, the Myrtle Beach Branch began at a junction with the Atlantic Coast Line's Main Line in Elrod, North Carolina (just south of Pembroke). From Elrod, it proceeded southeast to Fairmont, Proctorville, and Boardman before reaching Chadbourn. In Chadbourn, the Myrtle Beach Branch crossed the Atlantic Coast Line's east–west Wilmington—Pee Dee Line.

From Chadbourn, the Myrtle Beach Branch proceeded south-southwest to Tabor City and crossed into South Carolina. Once in South Carolina, it continued its south-southwest trajectory to Conway and then turned southeast to its terminus in Myrtle Beach. A branch from Conway northwest to Aynor also existed at one point.

== History ==
=== Elrod to Conway ===
The first segment of the Myrtle Beach Branch built was between Chadbourn and Conway. It was built in 1887 by the Wilmington, Chadbourn and Conway Railroad. The Wilmington, Chadbourn and Conway Railroad was renamed the Wilmington and Conway Railroad in 1895 and was acquired by the Wilmington, Columbia & Augusta Railroad a year later. The Wilmington, Columbia & Augusta Railroad then became part of the Atlantic Coast Line Railroad in 1897.

The north end of the line from Elrod to Fairmont was built in 1898 by the Southeastern Railroad, which was owned by the Wilmington and Weldon Railroad. In 1900, it was extended south to Chadborne and was merged with Atlantic Coast Line Railroad. This made a continuous line from Elrod to Conway.

=== Conway to Myrtle Beach ===
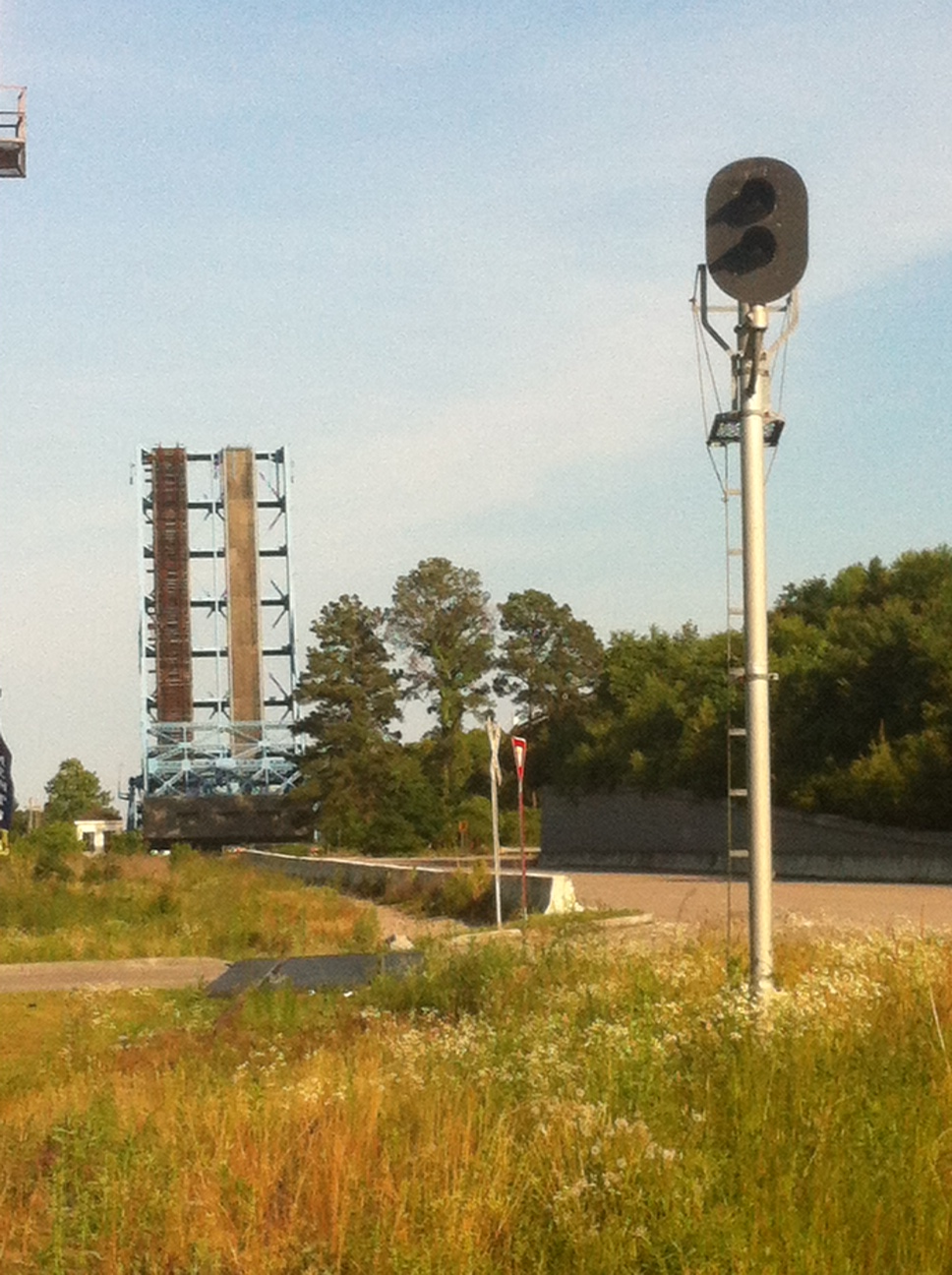
1937 bridge over Intracoastal Waterway near Myrtle Beach

In 1900, the Conway Seashore Railroad was built from Conway to Myrtle Beach. The Conway Seashore Railroad was built by the sons of local businessman Franklin Burroughs. Franklin Burroughs was the founder of the Burroughs and Collins Company of Conway, predecessor of modern-day Burroughs & Chapin. In 1904, the Conway Seashore Railroad's name was changed to the Conway Coast and Western Railroad and it was eventually extended from Conway to Aynor.

The Atlantic Coast Line took over the Conway Coast and Western Railroad in 1912, which completed the Myrtle Beach Branch. Track from Conway to Aynor became the Aynor Branch.

=== Later years ===
In 1937, the Atlantic Coast Line built the current Myrtle Beach station. The same year, the current bridge over the intracoastal waterway near Pine Island was built in 1937 (which also carried the parallel US 501 highway).

The Aynor Branch was abandoned in 1941.

In the late 1940s, the Atlantic Coast Line was operating one mixed train (containing both passengers and freight) six days a week from Elrod to Myrtle Beach. This mixed train connected with the Atlantic Coast Line's Palmetto on the main line at Elrod.

In 1949, the ACL abandoned the line between Fairmont and Chadbourn. The remaining line from Elrod to Fairmont remained in service as the Fairmont Branch which then only had local freight service. Passenger service continued on the Myrtle Beach Branch from Chadbourn to Myrtle Beach until 1955, when the line became freight-only.

In 1967, the Atlantic Coast Line merged with its rival, the Seaboard Air Line Railroad (SAL). The merged company was named the Seaboard Coast Line Railroad (SCL). Seaboard Coast Line continued operating the line as the Myrtle Beach Subdivision from Chadbourn to Myrtle Beach, and the Fairmont Subdivision from Elrod to Fairmont. The rest of the Fairmont Subdivision was abandoned in 1988.

In November 1984, Horry County, South Carolina purchased the line from Conway to Myrtle Beach. It was operated by the Horry County Railway until October 1987, when it was then leased to the Waccamaw Coast Line Railroad for operations. The Carolina Southern Railroad acquired the Waccamaw Coast Line Railroad in September 1995.

In 1987, the South Carolina Department of Transportation declared the section east of the Pine Island Bridge over the Intracoastal Waterway to be unsafe. The state spent $4.2 million to restore the 50-year-old bridge, which reopened in summer 1997. The first train crossed the repaired bridge June 22, 2001 after Carolina Southern spent $900,000 to bring the section east of the waterway up to the standards needed for regular service.

== Current conditions ==
The remaining line from Chadbourn to Myrtle Beach is still in service and is operated by the R.J. Corman Railroad Group, who also operates track from Chadbourn east to Whiteville and west to Mullins. R.J. Corman acquired the line and restored freight service up to Pine Island in 2015. However, tracks to Myrtle Beach proper are inactive since the drawbridge over the Intracoastal Waterway between Pine Island and Myrtle Beach has been inoperable since 2011. As of 2020 the city of Myrtle Beach plans to turn 2.5 miles (4.0 km) of the line within the city into a rail trail.

== Historic stations ==
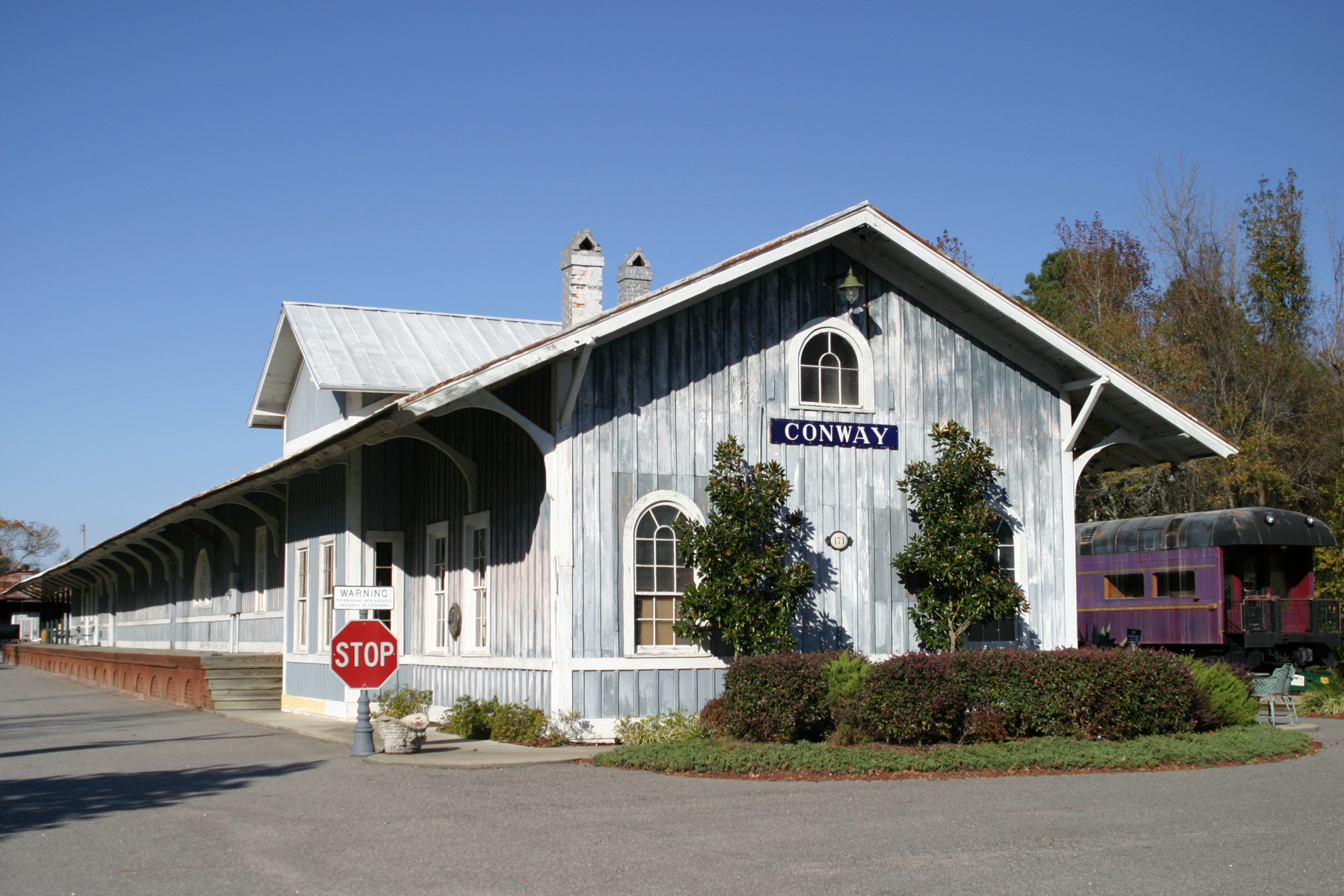
Conway depot (built in 1928 by the Atlantic Coast Line)

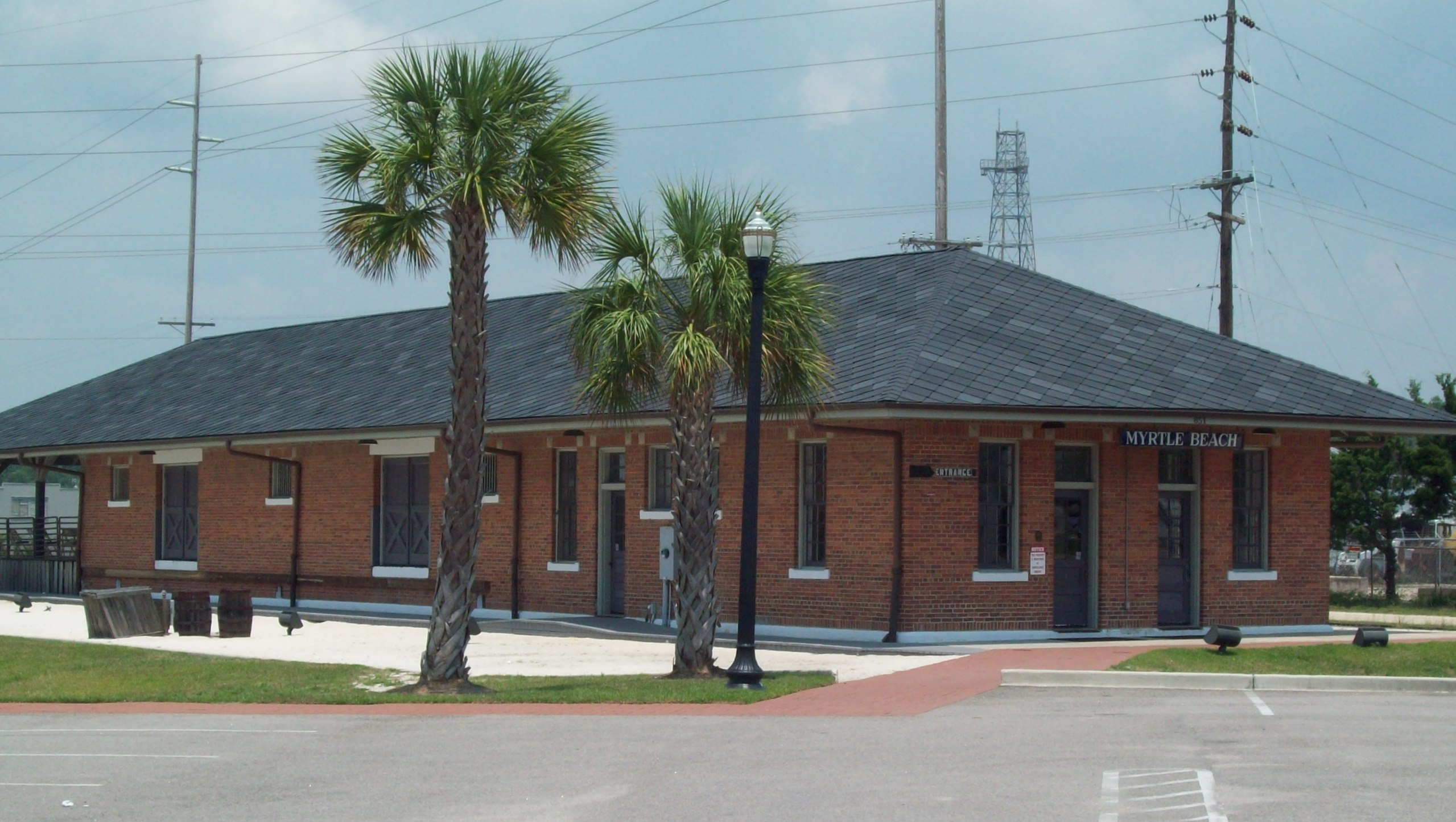
Myrtle Beach station (built by the Atlantic Coast Line in 1937)

Elrod to Myrtle Beach
State	Milepost	City/Location	Station	Connections and notes
NC	AH 246.3	Elrod	Elrod	junction with Atlantic Coast Line Railroad Main Line
NC	AH 250.9	Raynham	Raynham	
NC	AH 252.9	McDonald	McDonald	
NC	AH 258.0	Fairmont	Fairmont	originally known as Ashpole
NC	AH 262.6	Proctorville	Proctorville	junction with Raleigh and Charleston Railroad (SAL)
NC	AH 264.6	Orrum	Orrum	
NC	AH 268.4	Boardman	Boardman	originally known as Hub
NC	AH 271.4	Evergreen	Evergreen	
NC	AH 279.4; ACH 297.2	Chadbourn	Chadbourn	junction with Atlantic Coast Line Railroad Wilmington—Pee Dee Line
NC	ACH 305.4		Clarendon	
NC	ACH 310.0	Tabor City	Tabor City	originally named Mount Tabor
SC	ACH 316.8	Loris	Loris	
SC	ACH 321.1		Allsbrook	
SC	ACH 323.6		Gurley	
SC	ACH 328.1		Adrian	
SC	ACH 332.9	Homewood	Homewood	
SC	ACH 336.1	Conway	Conway	rebuilt in 1928 junction with Aynor Branch
SC	ACH 346.1	Pine Island	Pine Island	
SC	ACH 350.1	Myrtle Beach	Myrtle Beach	rebuilt in 1937

Aynor Branch
Milepost	City/Location	Station	Connections and notes
336.1	Conway	Conway	junction with Myrtle Beach Branch
		Horry	
347.9	Cool Spring	Cool Spring	
352.2	Aynor	Aynor	
