= Atlantic Coast Line Railroad Depot =

Atlantic Coast Line Railroad Depot or Atlantic Coast Line Depot may refer to:

- Atlantic Coast Line Depot, a list of stations on the Atlantic Coast Line Railroad

== Individual stations ==
- Dade City Atlantic Coast Line Railroad Depot, Dade City, FL, listed on the NRHP in Florida
- Old Dundee Atlantic Coast Line Railroad Depot, Dundee, FL
- Old Lake Placid Atlantic Coast Line Railroad Depot, Lake Placid, FL
- Atlantic Coast Line Railroad Depot (Lake Wales, Florida), listed on the NRHP in Florida
- Union Depot and Atlantic Coast Line Freight Station, Live Oak, FL, listed on the NRHP in Florida
- Old Mount Dora Atlantic Coast Line Railroad Station, Mount Dora, FL
- Punta Gorda Atlantic Coast Line Depot, Punta Gorda, FL, listed on the NRHP in Florida
- Atlantic Coast Line Passenger Depot (Sarasota, Florida), listed on the NRHP in Florida
- Atlantic Coast Line Railroad Station (Fayetteville, North Carolina), listed on the NRHP in North Carolina
- Atlantic Coast Line Railroad Depot (Conway, South Carolina), listed on the NRHP in South Carolina
- Atlantic Coast Line Depot (Florence, South Carolina), now called Florence station
- Myrtle Beach Atlantic Coast Line Railroad Station, Myrtle Beach, SC, listed on the NRHP in South Carolina

== See also ==
- Atlantic Coast Line Railroad, U.S. Class I railroad from 1900 until 1967
