= Atlantic Coast Line Depot =

The Atlantic Coast Line Railroad was a US Class I railroad from 1900 until 1967. The following former and active train stations were previously used by the Atlantic Coast Line Railroad. Many of them are listed on the National Register of Historic Places.

== Florida ==
- Bostwick station
- Bradenton station
- Brooksville station
- Chiefland station
- Clearwater station (Atlantic Coast Line)
- Crystal River station
- Dade City Atlantic Coast Line Railroad Depot, listed on the NRHP in Florida
- DeLand station
- Doctors Lake station
- Dunedin station
- Old Dundee Atlantic Coast Line Railroad Depot
- Dunnellon Atlantic Coast Line Railroad Depot (part of the Dunnellon Boomtown Historic District)
- Green Cove Springs station
- Haines City station
- High Springs station—This was the southern end of the Jacksonville Southwestern Railroad (JSW), operated by Cummer Cypress in Jacksonville, major shops and yards were maintained in High Springs, The JSW was purchased by the ACL, Florida Railroad Commission approved the purchase on July 28, 1904.)
- Inverness station (Florida)
- Old Gainesville Depot—Now part of Santa Fe College
- Jacksonville
  - Catherine Street Station—This station was owned and operated by the Jacksonville Southwestern and purchased with that property, The Florida Railroad Commission approved the purchase on July 28, 1904. The daily Passenger trains continued to use the Catherine Street station for some time after the purchase for the benefit of Cummer Cypress employees)
  - Jacksonville station (Atlantic Coast Line Freight Depot)—The freight station was owned and operated by the Atlantic and East Coast Terminal Company which was jointly owned by the Atlantic Coast Line and the Florida East Coast railroads)
  - Prime F. Osborn III Convention Center (Union Terminal Station) -- The Jacksonville Terminal Company was jointly owned by the Atlantic Coast Line, Seaboard Air Line, Georgia Southern and Florida and the Florida East Coast railroads) "Once we leave Washington D.C. we see no more of that kind of railroading until we reach Jacksonville Terminal
  - Yukon station (Florida)—Pete Rood was the last active Agent, depot was moved then razed in 2014
- Kissimmee station
- Lacoochee station
- Lady Lake station
- Old Lake Placid Atlantic Coast Line Railroad Depot
- Atlantic Coast Line Railroad Depot (Lake Wales, Florida), listed on the NRHP in Florida
- Lakeland station
- Largo station
- Union Depot and Atlantic Coast Line Freight Station, Live Oak, listed on the NRHP in Florida
- McIntosh station
- Magnolia Springs station
- Old Mount Dora Atlantic Coast Line Railroad Station
- Ocala Union Station
- Orange Park station
- Orlando
  - Church Street Station (Orlando) until 1926
  - Orlando Health/Amtrak station
- Palatka station
- Pinellas Park station
- Plant City Union Depot
- Punta Gorda Atlantic Coast Line Depot, listed on the NRHP in Florida
- Quitman station
- Russell station
- St. Petersburg station (Amtrak)
- San Antonio station (Florida)
- Sanford (Atlantic Coast Line)
- Atlantic Coast Line Passenger Depot (Sarasota, Florida), listed on the NRHP in Florida
- Tampa Union Station—Was jointly owned by the Atlantic Coast Line, Seaboard Air Line and the Tampa Northern railroads
- Tarpon Springs Depot
- Tavares station
- Trenton Depot
- Trilby station—Became the second largest railroad center in Florida, phased out in favor of the former Seaboard Air Line route after their merger, hardly a trace of Trilby's railroad heritage remains.
- Umatilla station (Florida)
- West Palm Beach station (Atlantic Coast Line)
- Williston station (Florida)
- Winter Park station
- Zephyrhills station

== Georgia ==
- Alma station (Georgia)
- Heritage Plaza (Albany, Georgia)
- Jesup station
- Savannah station (Amtrak)

== North Carolina ==
- Atkinson station (North Carolina)
- Aulander station
- Ayden station
- Battleboro station
- Beard station
- Benson, NC station
- Bethel station (North Carolina)
- Bowdens station
- Buie station
- Bunn station
- Burgaw Depot
- Calypso station
- Castle Hayne station
- Clinton Depot
- Chadbourn station
- Conetoe station
- Delco station
- Dunn station
- Elm City station
- Enfield station (North Carolina)
- Evergreen station (North Carolina)
- Fairmont station (North Carolina)
- Fair Bluff station
- Fayetteville (Amtrak station), listed on the NRHP in North Carolina
- Four Oaks, NC station
- Garland station (North Carolina)
- Goldsboro Union Station
- Grifton station
- Halifax, NC station
- House station (North Carolina)
- Hope Mills station
- Kenly station (North Carolina)
- Lake Waccamaw Depot
- Lucama station
- Maxton station
- Maysville station (North Carolina)
- Milan station
- Morvern station
- Mt. Olive (North Carolina)
- Nashville station (North Carolina)
- New Bern station
- Orrum station
- Pactolus station
- Parkersburg station (North Carolina)
- Parkton station (North Carolina)
- Parmele station
- Pembroke station
- Plymouth station (North Carolina)
- Pollocksville station
- Proctorville station (North Carolina)
- Rennert station
- Robersonville station
- Rocky Mount (Amtrak station)
- Roduco station
- Roseboro station (North Carolina)
- Rowland Depot
- Sanford station (Atlantic Coast Line)
- Scotland Neck station
- Selma Union Depot
- Sharpsburg station (North Carolina)
- Smithfield station (Atlantic Coast Line)
- Speed station (North Carolina)
- Spring Hope station
- Stedman station
- Tabor City station
- Tillery station
- Wade station
- Wallace station (North Carolina)
- Washington station (North Carolina)
- Weldon station (North Carolina)
- Whichard station
- Whitakers station
- Whiteville station (North Carolina)
- Willard station (North Carolina)
- Wilson (Amtrak station)

== South Carolina ==
- Bonneau station
- Cades station
- Cameron station (South Carolina)
- Charleston, South Carolina (Amtrak station)
- Clio station (South Carolina)
- Conway station (South Carolina), listed on the NRHP in South Carolina
- Cope station (South Carolina)
- Darlington station (South Carolina)
- Denmark (Amtrak station)
- Dillon (Amtrak station)
- Effingham station (South Carolina)
- Ehrhardt station
- Elloree station
- Eutawville station
- Atlantic Coast Line Depot (Florence, South Carolina), listed on the NRHP in South Carolina
- Hartsville station (South Carolina)
- Holly Hill station
- Kingstree (Amtrak station)
- Lake City station (South Carolina)
- Lamar station (South Carolina)
- Latta station
- Loris station
- Marion station (South Carolina)
- Mayesville station
- Moncks Corner station
- Mullins station
- Myrtle Beach Atlantic Coast Line Railroad Station, listed on the NRHP in South Carolina
- Pinewood Depot
- Pee Dee station
- Ravenel station
- Salters station
- St. Stephens station
- Tatum station
- Timmonsville station
- Walterboro station
- White Hall station (South Carolina)
- Yemassee (Amtrak station)

== Virginia ==
- Emporia station (Virginia)
- Petersburg (Amtrak station), Ettrick
- Norfolk station (Virginia)
- Junction of Richmond and Petersburg Railroad and Tidewater and Western Railroad which is now defunct.
