= Southeastern Railroad =

Overview
- Successor: Atlantic Coast Line Railroad; Seaboard Coast Line Railroad

Technical
- Track gauge: 4 ft 8 1/2 in (1,435 mm) standard gauge

The Southeastern Railroad was a railroad line in southern North Carolina that ran between Elrod and Chadbourn.

== History ==
The Southeastern Railroad and Lumber Company was formed by Neill G. Wade and A. L. Jones. Wade operated three saw mills in Cumberland County and Jones operated a saw mill in Buie (located about 10 miles north of Elrod on the Atlantic Coast Line Railroad's main line). Jones and Wade then leased an undeveloped right of way and built the rail line from Elrod to Hub (known today as Boardman) to access large tracts of virgin timber. The line was complete from Elrod to Ashpole (known today as Fairmont) in 1898. By 1900, it was extended to Chadbourn, where many strawberry fields were located. There was also a rail connection to Wilmington, North Carolina (via the Wilmington and Manchester Railroad) in Chadbourn.

As the line was completed, it was taken over by the Atlantic Coast Line Railroad (ACL). The ACL also bought the Wilmington, Chadbourn and Conway Railroad and the two lines eventually became part of their Myrtle Beach Branch.

In 1949, the ACL abandoned the line between Fairmont and Chadbourn. The remaining line from Elrod to Fairmont remained in service as a spur from the main line.

The Atlantic Coast Line became the Seaboard Coast Line Railroad (SCL) in 1967 after merging with their former rival, the Seaboard Air Line Railroad. In 1980, the Seaboard Coast Line's parent company merged with the Chessie System, creating the CSX Corporation. The CSX Corporation initially operated the Chessie and Seaboard Systems separately until 1986, when they were merged into CSX Transportation.

The rest of the line was abandoned in 1988.
