= Waccamaw Coast Line Railroad =

Overview
- Headquarters: Chadbourn, North Carolina
- Reporting mark: WCLR
- Locale: Northeastern South Carolina
- Dates of operation: 1987–2015

Technical
- Track gauge: 4 ft 8 1/2 in (1,435 mm) standard gauge

The Waccamaw Coast Line Railroad (reporting mark WCLR) was a 14.1-mile (22.7 km) short-line railroad division of the Baltimore and Annapolis Railroad, extending from a connection with the Carolina Southern Railroad, another division of that company, at Conway to Myrtle Beach, South Carolina. The line was opened in 1900 by the Conway Coast and Western Railroad, a predecessor of the Atlantic Coast Line Railroad. The Seaboard System Railroad sold the line to Horry County in November 1984, and it was operated by the Horry County Railway (reporting mark HCYR) until October 1987, when the WCLR took over. The Carolina Southern Railroad acquired the WCLR in September 1995, and operated until both its lines and WCLR's line ceased operations. In 2015, RJ Corman took control of the Carolina Southern and all of its trackage and rehabilitated it as the R.J. Corman Carolina Lines.

== See also ==
- Carolina Southern Railroad
- R.J. Corman Railroad Group
