= Wilmington—Pee Dee Line =

Atlantic Coast Line Railroad line in South Carolina

Overview
- Other name: Pee Dee Subdivision
- Status: Some segments are still operating
- Owner: Atlantic Coast Line Railroad (1902–1967); Seaboard Coast Line Railroad (1967–1986)
- Locale: South Carolina

Technical
- Track gauge: 1,435 mm (4 ft 8 1/2 in) standard gauge
- Electrification: No
- Signalling: None

The Atlantic Coast Line Railroad's Wilmington—Pee Dee Line was a railroad line running from Wilmington, North Carolina west to Pee Dee, South Carolina (just west of Florence). Running in an east–west trajectory, it notably passed through Lake Waccamaw, Chadbourn, Nichols, and Mullins. Some of the line is still operating today.

== History ==
The Wilmington—Pee Dee Line was built originally built by the Wilmington and Manchester Railroad in 1853. The Wilmington and Manchester's eastern terminus was originally just outside of Wilmington near Navassa (on the west side of the Cape Fear River). In 1866, the Wilmington and Manchester Railroad created the Wilmington Railway Bridge Company as a joint venture with the Wilmington, Charlotte and Rutherford Railroad (later known as the Carolina Central Railroad) to build a bridge over the Cape Fear River. The bridge, which was jointly owned by both railroads, was completed in 1867 allowing both railroad to extend into central Wilmington.

The Wilmington and Manchester Railroad was reorganized as the short-lived Wilmington and Carolina Railroad in 1870 and again as the Wilmington, Columbia and Augusta Railroad in 1877.

The Wilmington, Columbia and Augusta Railroad, along with the Wilmington and Weldon Railroad network and other railroads, were all considered to be part of the group of independent railroads known as the Atlantic Coast Line by the late 1890s. The lines were formally merged into the Atlantic Coast Line Railroad in 1898. Once under Atlantic Coast Line ownership, the company designated the former Wilmington and Manchester Railroad as the Wilmington—Pee Dee Line (part of their C Line) east of Pee Dee. The former Wilmington and Manchester west of Pee Dee was incorporated into the Atlantic Coast Line's Main Line and Florence—Robbins Line. Wilmington would also be the location of the Atlantic Coast Line's headquarters from 1900 to 1956.

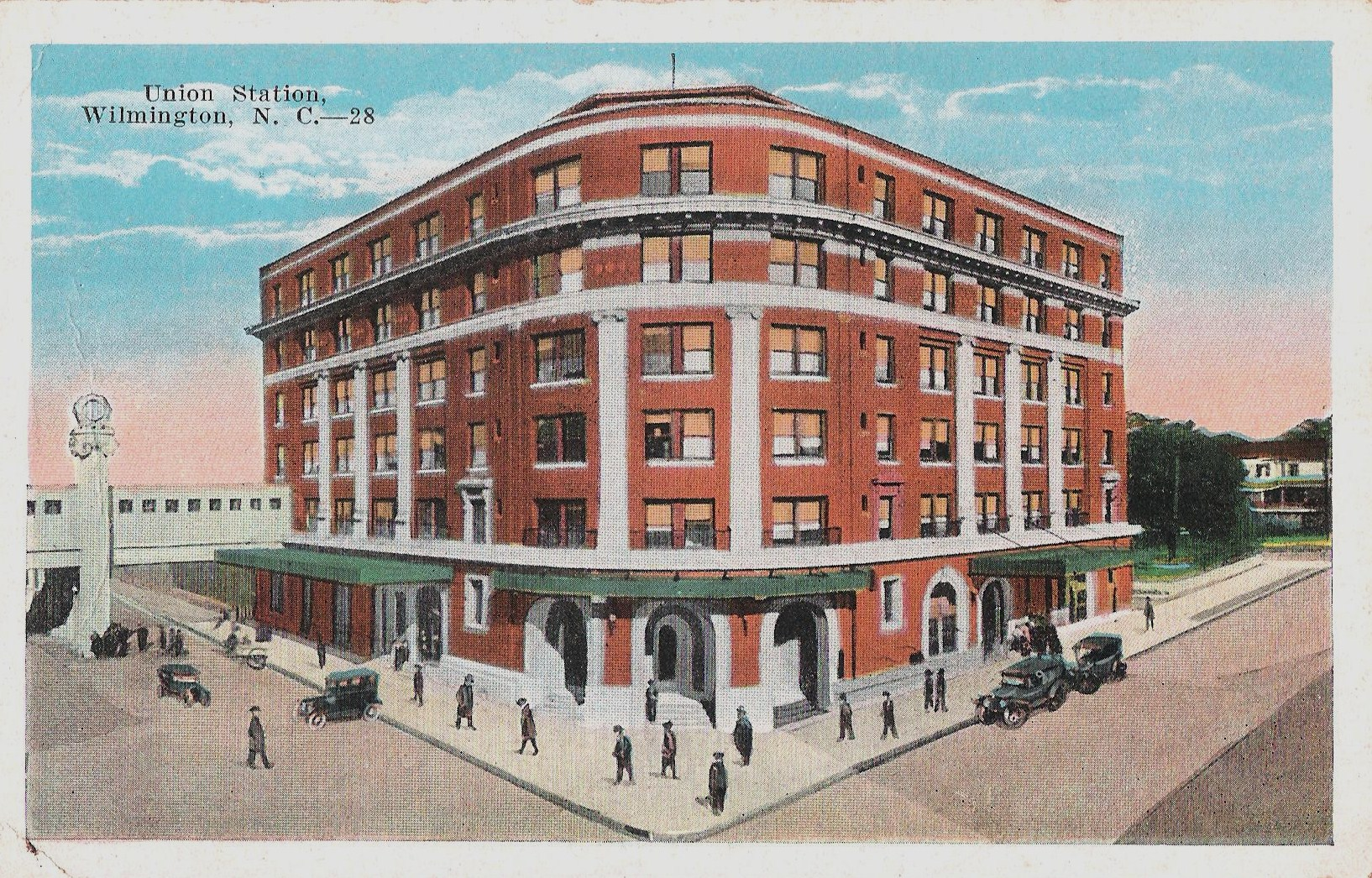
Wilmington Union Station

The easternmost five miles of the Wilmington—Pee Dee Line from Navassa to Wilmington were jointly operated by the Atlantic Coast Line and their rival, the Seaboard Air Line Railroad (who absorbed the Carolina Central Railroad in 1900).

The Atlantic Coast Line would operate both passenger and freight service on the Wilmington—Pee Dee Line. By 1949, a daily local passenger train was running the full line from Wilmington (which ran to Sumter) in addition to a daily through freight train and a local freight train that ran six days a week. Passenger could also connect with passenger services on the Myrtle Beach Branch at Chadbourn.

In 1967, the Atlantic Coast Line merged with its rival, the Seaboard Air Line Railroad (SAL). The merged company was named the Seaboard Coast Line Railroad (SCL). Seaboard Coast Line continued operating the line as the Pee Dee Subdivision. By then, passenger service had been discontinued on the line. In the late 1970s, the Pee Dee Subdivision was abandoned between Whiteville and Malmo.

In 1980, the Seaboard Coast Line's parent company merged with the Chessie System, creating the CSX Corporation. The CSX Corporation initially operated the Chessie and Seaboard Systems separately until 1986, when they were merged into CSX Transportation. In the mid-1980s, the Pee Dee Subdivision was abandoned between the A Line (the former ACL Main Line) at Pee Dee and Mullins.

== Current operations ==
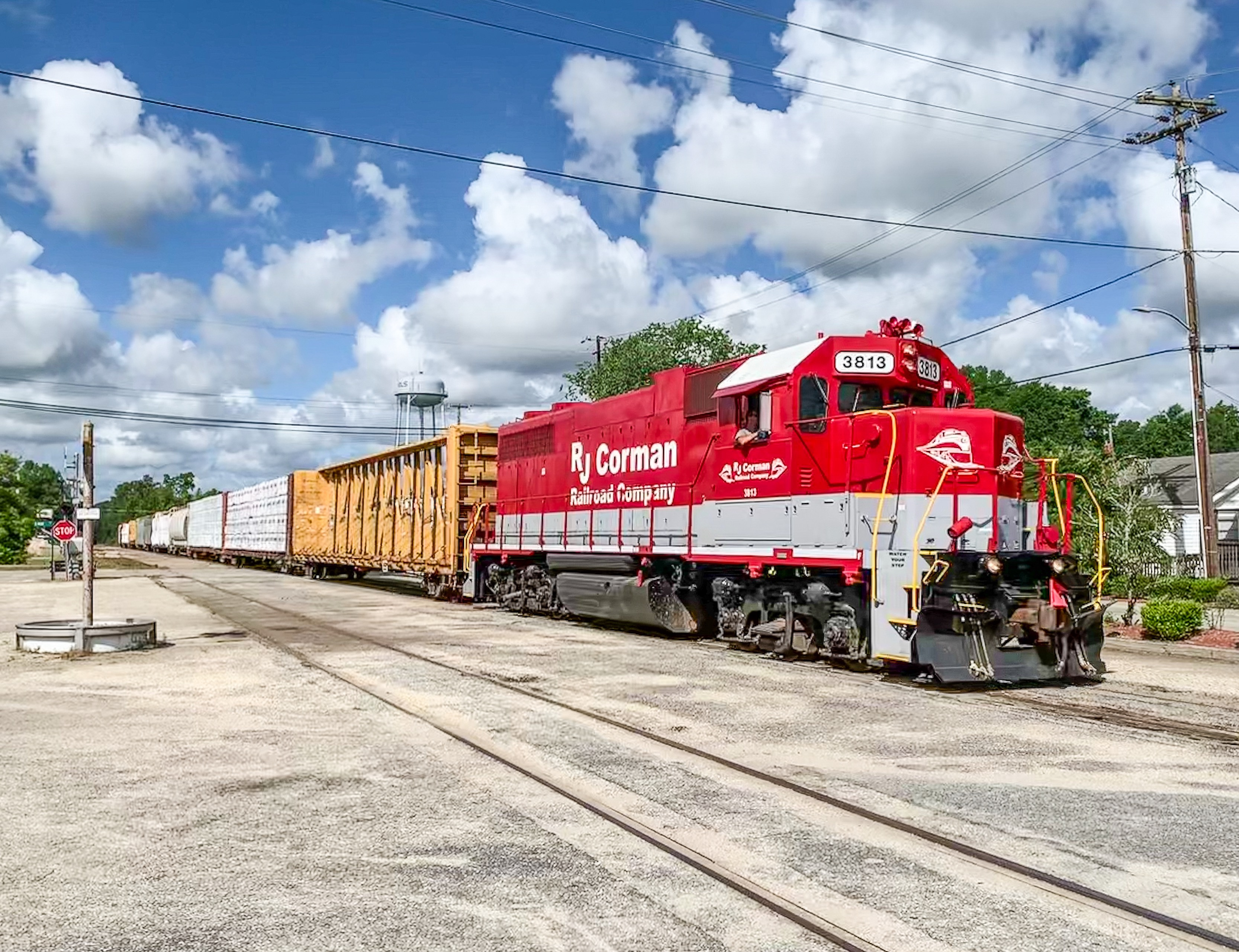
R.J. Corman Railroad train passing through Nichols

Today, the line is still operating in two segments.

The remaining line from Mullins to Whiteville is today operated by the R.J. Corman Railroad Group

A short segment from Navassa to Malmo is still operating and is now CSX's Malmo Spur. The Malmo Spur connects with the Sunny Point Railroad which is operated by the United States Department of Defense and runs south to the Military Ocean Terminal Sunny Point.

== Historic stations ==
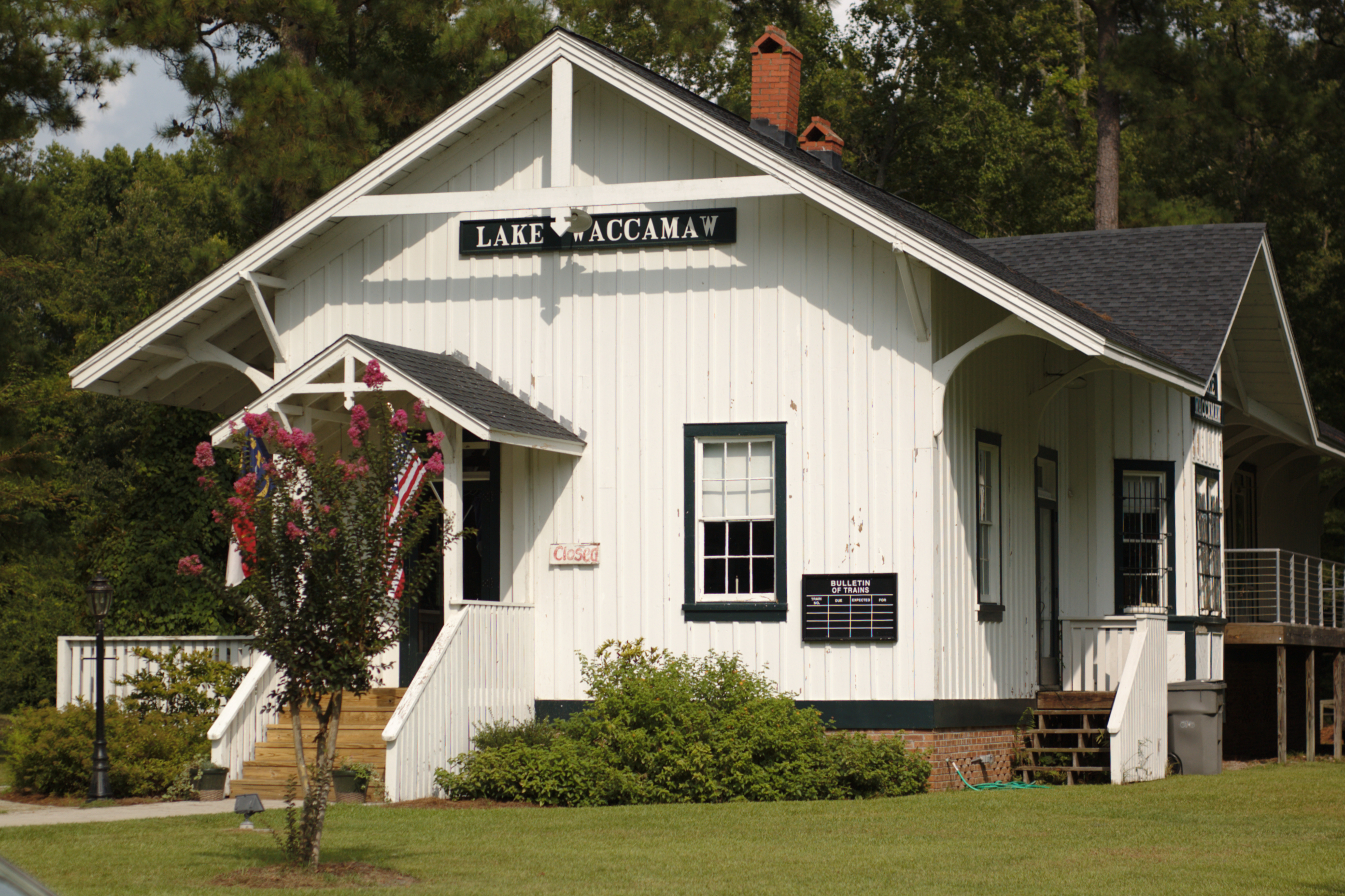
Lake Waccamaw Depot

State	Milepost	City/Location	Station	Connections and notes
NC	AC 244.5	Wilmington	Wilmington Union Station	junction with Wilmington and Weldon Railroad (ACL)
NC	AC 246.6		Yadkin Junction	junction with Atlantic Coast Line Railroad Sanford Branch
NC	AC 249.3	Navassa	Navassa	junction with: Seaboard Air Line Railroad Wilmington Subdivision; Wilmington, Brunswick and Southern Railroad
NC	AC 255.4		Malmo	
NC	AC 262.1		Delco	
NC	AC 273.0	Bolton	Bolton	
NC	AC 280.0	Lake Waccamaw	Lake Waccamaw	
NC	AC 284.5		Hallsboro	
NC	AC 290.2	Whiteville	Whiteville	
NC	AC 297.2	Chadbourn	Chadbourn	junction with Myrtle Beach Branch
NC	AC 303.2	Cerro Gordo	Cerro Gordo	
NC	AC 309.2	Fair Bluff	Fair Bluff	
SC	AC 318.2	Nichols	Nichols	
SC	AC 324.4	Mullins	Mullins	junction with Seaboard Air Line Railroad Andrews Subdivision
SC	AC 332.8	Marion	Marion	
SC	AC 341.2		Pee Dee	junction with Atlantic Coast Line Railroad Main Line
