= Myrtle Beach station (Atlantic Coast Line Railroad) =

- Myrtle Beach Atlantic Coast Line Railroad Station
- U.S. National Register of Historic Places
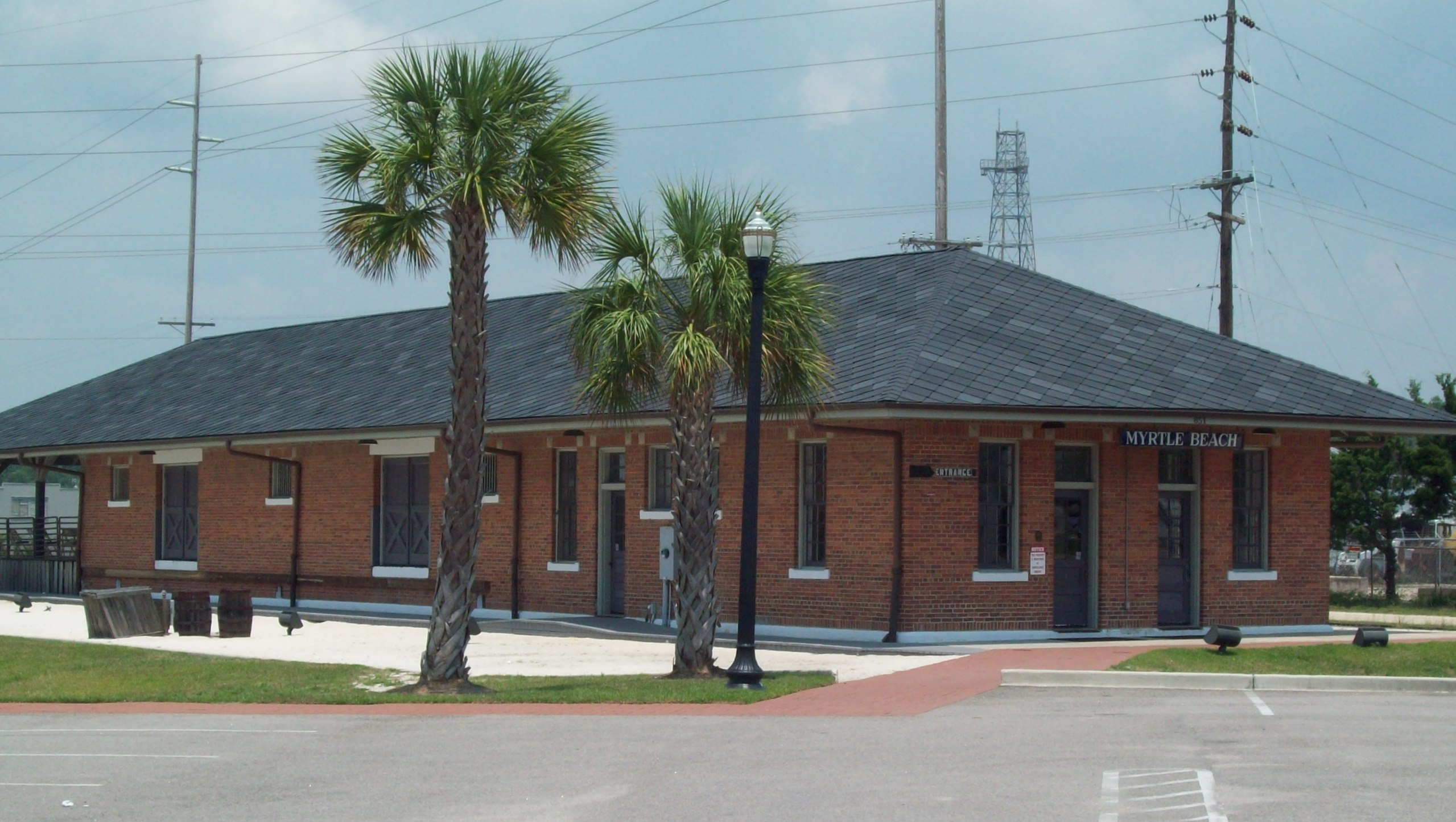
- Myrtle Beach Atlantic Coast Line Railroad Station, June 2010

- Location within South Carolina Location within the United States
- Location: 851 Broadway St, Myrtle Beach, South Carolina
- Coordinates: 33°41′41″N 78°53′8″W
- Area: less than one acre
- Built: 1935
- Architectural style: Late 19th And Early 20th Century American Movements
- MPS: Myrtle Beach MPS
- NRHP reference No.: 96001212
- Added to NRHP: July 22, 2002

Myrtle Beach Atlantic Coast Line Railroad Depot is a historic train station located at Myrtle Beach in Horry County, South Carolina. It was built in 1937 by the Atlantic Coast Line Railroad, and is one-story rectangular building was constructed with the standard ACL bi-level floor plan that has a raised freight room with steps leading down to the lobby/office area. It features exterior architectural detailing reflecting Colonial Revival, Craftsman, and Mission stylistic influences.

It was listed on the National Register of Historic Places in 2002.

== Prior passenger services ==
Until 1955 the Atlantic Coast Line Railroad ran passenger rail service from the station along the Myrtle Beach Branch to Chadbourn, North Carolina, where a connection could be made to a train bound for Florence, South Carolina, Sumter, South Carolina and Columbia's Union Station to the west, and Wilmington, North Carolina to the east. By the start of the 1950's, the train went beyond Chadbourn to Elrod, North Carolina, where a connection could be made to the ACL's Palmetto. From 1955, onward, there was primarily freight service from Myrtle Beach, with the last passenger train departing on October 23, 1986. Horry County bought the railroad from CSX in 1984 using federal and state money. The state condemned the tracks east of the Intracoastal Waterway in 1988. As of 1996, the local and state governments had spent millions, including $4 million to repair the drawbridge over the waterway. Carolina Southern Railroad, which was leasing the railroad at the time, offered $425,000 to buy the line, intending for passenger service to resume and generate $1 million a year, but the county rejected the offer. Repairs to the waterway bridge were completed in 1997.

== Restoration effort ==
Trains used the nearby train yard until 1971. The last freight train used the depot in 1988, and after that it became a beer distributor's warehouse. When it appeared the depot would be torn down, the city bought it for $750,000 in 2000. A concrete block addition came down in 2001 as efforts began to have the property named to the National Register. By the time the designation was achieved, the All Aboard Committee had raised $470,000 of the $677,000 restoration cost. The depot opened as a museum May 6, 2004. A. Dale Gilliland, AIA volunteered his services as architect to restore the depot.

Preceding station	Atlantic Coast Line Railroad	Following station
Pine Island toward Elrod	Myrtle Beach Branch	Terminus
