= Boardman, North Carolina =

- Town
- Location within the state of North Carolina
- Coordinates: 34°26′11″N 78°56′48″W
- Country: United States
- State: North Carolina
- County: Columbus

Government
  - Type: Town Council
  - Mayor: Eric Williamson

Area
  - Total: 3.11 sq mi (8.06 km^{2})
  - Land: 3.09 sq mi (8.00 km^{2})
  - Water: 0.023 sq mi (0.06 km^{2})
- Elevation: 89 ft (27 m)

Population (2020)
  - Total: 166
  - Density: 53.7/sq mi (20.75/km^{2})
- Time zone: UTC-5 (Eastern (EST))
  - Summer (DST): UTC-4 (EDT)
- FIPS code: 37-06660
- GNIS feature ID: 2405292

Boardman is a town in Columbus County, North Carolina, United States. The population was 166 at the 2020 census.

== Geography ==
According to the United States Census Bureau, the town has a total area of 3.1 square miles (8.0 km^{2}), of which 3.1 square miles (8.1 km^{2}) is land and 0.04 square miles (0.10 km^{2}) of it (0.64%) is water.

== History ==
When Boardman was first established, it was known as Hub, named after H. U. Butters, the founder of the Butters Lumber Company. The company operated the largest timber operation in North Carolina, featuring a lumber mill and large colonial-era housing.

In 1899, Hub became one of the stops of the Southeastern Railroad, which later became a section of the Atlantic Coast Line's Myrtle Beach Branch. Later, the community was renamed to Boardman after the Baptist missionary George Dana Boardman. When the Butters Lumber Company relocated in 1926, Boardman's booming industrial era came to an end. Furthermore, Boardman's railroad line was abandoned in the 1970s, leaving the town as a quiet settlement in Columbus County.

== Demographics ==
Historical population
Census	Pop.	Note	%±
1900	604		—
1910	796		31.8%
1920	828		4.0%
1930	158		−80.9%
2000	202		—
2010	157		−22.3%
2020	166		5.7%
U.S. Decennial Census; 2010 2020

=== 2020 census ===
Boardman town, North Carolina – Demographic Profile (NH = Non-Hispanic)
Race / Ethnicity	Pop 2010	Pop 2020	% 2010	% 2020
White alone (NH)	104	93	66.24%	56.02%
Black or African American alone (NH)	53	45	33.76%	27.11%
Native American or Alaska Native alone (NH)	0	5	0.00%	3.01%
Asian alone (NH)	0	0	0.00%	0.00%
Pacific Islander alone (NH)	0	0	0.00%	0.00%
Some Other Race alone (NH)	0	1	0.00%	0.60%
Mixed Race/Multi-Racial (NH)	0	4	0.00%	2.41%
Hispanic or Latino (any race)	0	18	0.00%	10.84%
Total	157	166	100.00%	100.00%

Note: the US Census treats Hispanic/Latino as an ethnic category. This table excludes Latinos from the racial categories and assigns them to a separate category. Hispanics/Latinos can be of any race.

=== 2000 Census ===
As of the census of 2000, there were 202 people, 79 households, and 54 families residing in the town. The population density was 64.8 inhabitants per square mile (25.0/km^{2}). There were 89 housing units at an average density of 28.6 per square mile (11.0/km^{2}). The racial makeup of the town was 54.46% White, 44.55% African American, 0.99% from other races. Hispanic or Latino of any race were 0.99% of the population.

There were 79 households, out of which 22.8% had children under the age of 18 living with them, 39.2% were married couples living together, 24.1% had a female householder with no husband present, and 30.4% were non-families. 29.1% of all households were made up of individuals, and 13.9% had someone living alone who was 65 years of age or older. The average household size was 2.56 and the average family size was 3.15.

In the town, the population was spread out, with 23.8% under the age of 18, 9.4% from 18 to 24, 28.7% from 25 to 44, 22.3% from 45 to 64, and 15.8% who were 65 years of age or older. The median age was 38 years. For every 100 females, there were 69.7 males. For every 100 females age 18 and over, there were 69.2 males.

The median income for a household in the town was $20,500, and the median income for a family was $28,333. Males had a median income of $25,500 versus $20,417 for females. The per capita income for the town was $10,339. About 19.0% of families and 27.6% of the population were below the poverty line, including 45.5% of those under the age of eighteen and 28.6% of those 65 or over.
