= Wilmington, Chadbourn and Conway Railroad =

- Original route (click to enlarge)

Overview
- Successor: Atlantic Coast Line Railroad

Technical
- Track gauge: 5 ft (1,524 mm)

The Wilmington, Chadbourn and Conway Railroad was a Southeastern railroad that operated between Chadbourn, North Carolina and Conway, South Carolina near the end of the 19th century.

== History ==
The Chadbourn Lumber Company of Chadbourn, North Carolina, built the line to haul timber. It connected with the Wilmington and Manchester Railroad in Chadbourn.

The line crossed the North Carolina line at Tabor City, North Carolina. It continued south through Loris, South Carolina into Conway, South Carolina to its terminus at the Waccamaw River.

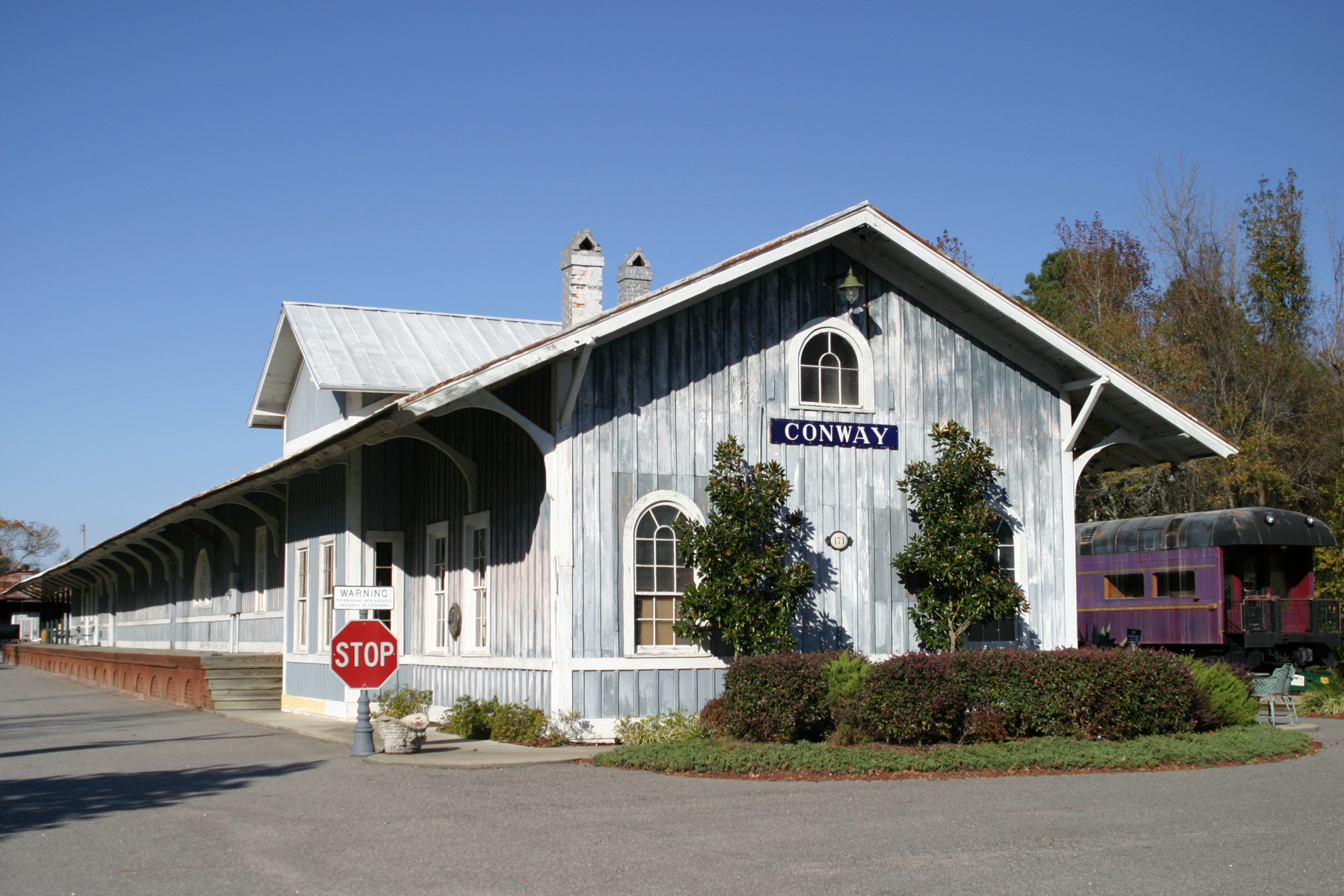
Conway depot (built in 1928 by the Atlantic Coast Line)

The line was sold at foreclosure in 1895 and renamed the Wilmington and Conway Railroad. The following year, the Wilmington and Conway was sold to the Wilmington, Columbia and Augusta Railroad (the successor of the Wilmington and Manchester Railroad).

In 1898, the line came under the ownership of the Atlantic Coast Line Railroad. In 1912, the Atlantic Coast Line bought the Conway Seashore Railroad, which extended from Conway to Myrtle Beach. The lines were incorporated into the Atlantic Coast Line's Myrtle Beach Branch.

The Atlantic Coast Line became the Seaboard Coast Line Railroad in 1967 after merging with their former rival, the Seaboard Air Line Railroad. In 1980, the Seaboard Coast Line's parent company merged with the Chessie System, creating the CSX Corporation. The CSX Corporation initially operated the Chessie and Seaboard Systems separately until 1986, when they were merged into CSX Transportation.

== Current operation ==
Today, the line is still in service and it is operated by the R.J. Corman Railroad Group
