= Conway station =

- Atlantic Coast Line Railroad Depot
- U.S. National Register of Historic Places
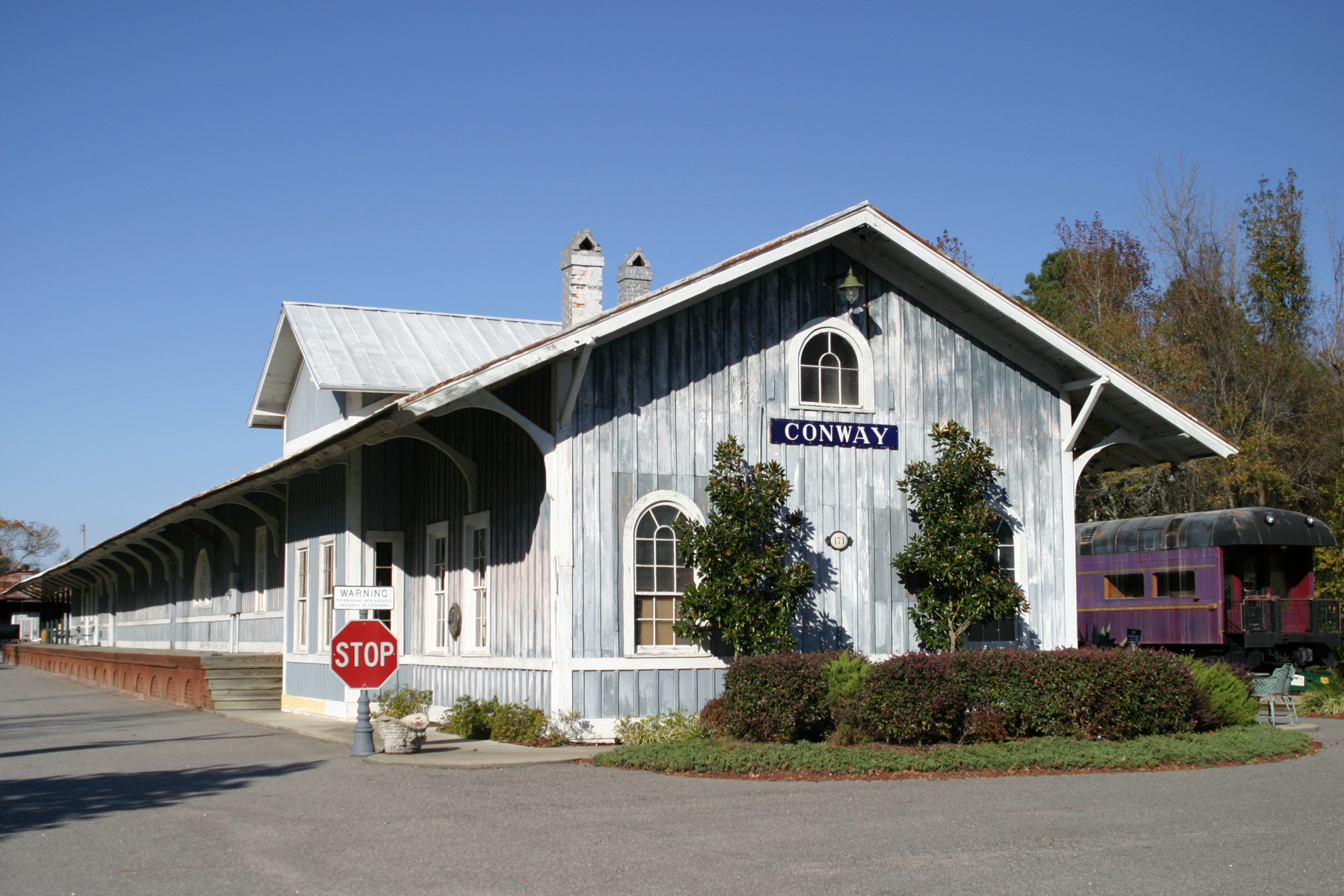
- Atlantic Coast Line Railroad Depot, November 2006

- Location within South Carolina Location within the United States
- Location: N side of US 701, Conway, South Carolina
- Coordinates: 33°50′17″N 79°2′36″W
- Area: 0.1 acres (0.040 ha)
- Built: 1928
- Architectural style: Bungalow/Craftsman
- MPS: Conway MRA
- NRHP reference No.: 86003839
- Added to NRHP: May 18, 1995

Atlantic Coast Line Railroad Depot is a historic train station located at Conway in Horry County, South Carolina. It was built in 1928 by the Atlantic Coast Line Railroad, and is a long, rectangular, one-story, gable-roofed, frame board-and-batten building. It features the wide overhanging eaves and is in the American Craftsman style.

It was listed on the National Register of Historic Places in 1995. The station depot caught fire on the morning of September 22, 2025.

Preceding station	Atlantic Coast Line Railroad	Following station
Adrian toward Elrod	Myrtle Beach Branch	Pine Island toward Myrtle Beach
