= Conway Seashore Railroad =

Railroad in South Carolina, US

- Original route (click to enlarge)

Overview
- Successor: Atlantic Coast Line Railroad

Technical
- Track gauge: 5 ft (1,524 mm)

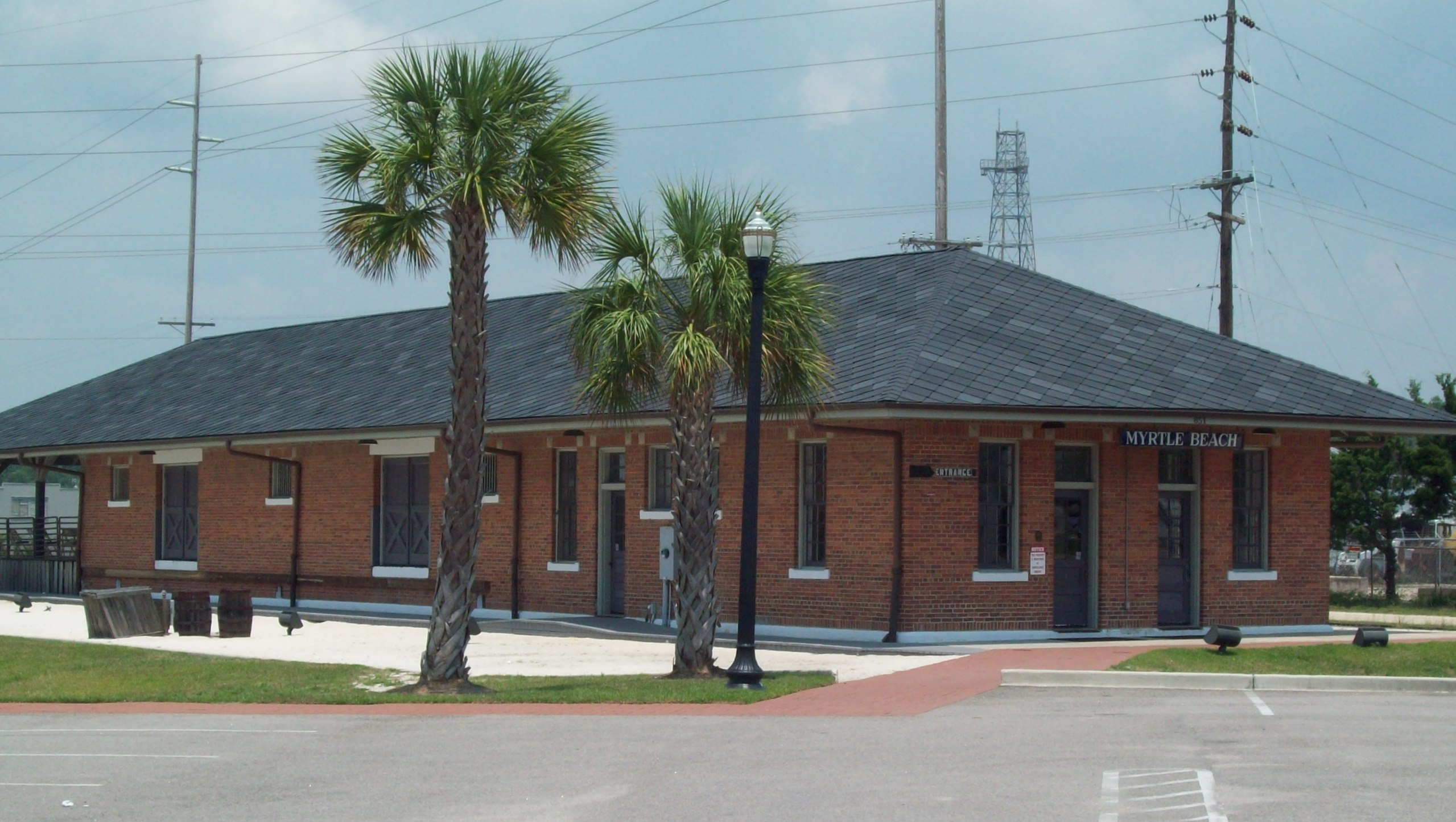
Myrtle Beach station (built by the Atlantic Coast Line in 1937)

The Conway Seashore Railroad was a South Carolina, US, railroad that operated in the early 20th century. It ran from Conway southeast to Myrtle Beach.

== History ==
The Conway Seashore Railroad was chartered by the South Carolina General Assembly in 1899. The Conway Seashore Railroad was built by the sons of local businessman Franklin Burroughs. Franklin Burroughs was the founder of the Burroughs and Collins Company of Conway, predecessor of modern-day Burroughs & Chapin. It began operation in 1900 and in 1904 the name of the carrier was changed to the Conway Coast and Western Railroad.

In 1912, the Conway Seashore was bought by the Atlantic Coast Line Railroad (ACL) which had previously bought the Wilmington, Chadbourn and Conway Railroad in 1898. After the purchase, the line was incorporated into the Atlantic Coast Line's Myrtle Beach Branch. The ACL operated both freight and passenger service to Myrtle Beach.

The Atlantic Coast Line became the Seaboard Coast Line Railroad in 1967 after merging with its former rival, the Seaboard Air Line Railroad. In 1980, the Seaboard Coast Line's parent company merged with the Chessie System, creating the CSX Corporation, which initially operated the Chessie and Seaboard Systems separately until 1986, when they were merged into CSX Transportation.

== Current operation ==
Today, the line is still in place and it is owned by the R.J. Corman Railroad Group R.J. Corman acquired the line and restored freight service up to Pine Island in 2015. However, tracks to Myrtle Beach proper are inactive since the drawbridge over the Intracoastal Waterway between Pine Island and Myrtle Beach has been inoperable since 2011.
