= Elrod, North Carolina =

- CDP
- Location within the state of North Carolina
- Coordinates: 34°36′26″N 79°13′51″W
- Country: United States
- State: North Carolina
- County: Robeson

Area
  - Total: 5.34 sq mi (13.83 km^{2})
  - Land: 5.34 sq mi (13.83 km^{2})
  - Water: 0 sq mi (0.00 km^{2})
- Elevation: 154 ft (47 m)

Population (2020)
  - Total: 391
  - Density: 73.2/sq mi (28.28/km^{2})
- Time zone: UTC-5 (Eastern (EST))
  - Summer (DST): UTC-4 (EDT)
- ZIP code: 28383
- Area codes: 910, 472

Elrod is a census-designated place (CDP) in Robeson County, North Carolina, United States. The population was 391 at the 2020 census.

== Geography ==
According to the United States Census Bureau, the CDP has a total area of 5.3 square miles (14 km^{2}), all land.

== History ==
The first postmaster for Elrod, North Carolina was Malcolm H. McCall on July 29, 1892. The post office lasted until August 31, 1957. Elrod was also the junction between the Atlantic Coast Line's Main Line and the Southeastern Railroad, which later became part of the Myrtle Beach Branch, both owned by the Atlantic Coast Line.

== Demographics ==
Historical population
Census	Pop.	Note	%±
2020	391		—
U.S. Decennial Census

As of the census of 2000, there were 441 people, 159 households, and 110 families residing in the CDP. The population density was 83.0 inhabitants per square mile (32.0/km^{2}). There were 164 housing units at an average density of 30.9 per square mile (11.9/km^{2}). The racial makeup of the CDP was 8.62% White, 23.58% African American, 65.99% Native American, and 1.81% from two or more races. Hispanic or Latino of any race were 3.85% of the population.

There were 159 households, out of which 38.4% had children under the age of 18 living with them, 44.7% were married couples living together, 18.9% had a female householder with no husband present, and 30.8% were non-families. 28.9% of all households were made up of individuals, and 12.6% had someone living alone who was 65 years of age or older. The average household size was 2.77 and the average family size was 3.45.

In the CDP, the population was spread out, with 30.2% under the age of 18, 8.8% from 18 to 24, 28.6% from 25 to 44, 21.5% from 45 to 64, and 10.9% who were 65 years of age or older. The median age was 32 years. For every 100 females, there were 81.5 males. For every 100 females age 18 and over, there were 83.3 males.

The median income for a household in the CDP was $18,125, and the median income for a family was $22,308. Males had a median income of $20,625 versus $19,125 for females. The per capita income for the CDP was $10,079. About 27.8% of families and 39.5% of the population were below the poverty line, including 57.3% of those under age 18 and 52.2% of those age 65 or over.
