= Carolina Southern Railroad =

Overview
- Headquarters: Conway, South Carolina
- Locale: United States from Mullins, South Carolina to Myrtle Beach, South Carolina
- Dates of operation: 1862–2011
- Successor: R.J. Corman Railroad/Carolina Lines

Technical
- Track gauge: 4 ft 8 1/2 in (1,435 mm) standard gauge
- Length: 95 miles (153 km)

Other
- Website: www.carolinasouthernrailroad.com [Ceased operation in 2012]

Carolina Southern Railroad (reporting mark CALA) was a shortline railroad located off of Main Street in Conway, South Carolina, and was one of the few remaining train depots/lines in South Carolina. The railroad was originally erected in late 1886 and the first train steamed into the Conway Depot in December 1887. R.J. Corman Railroad Group took over the operations in 2015.

The Carolina Southern Railroad Co. owned and operated several box cars, passenger cars as well as the City of Myrtle Beach Club Car. The City of Myrtle Beach Club Car travels along Highway 501, crosses the Intracoastal Waterway and finally stopped at City of Myrtle Beach Train Depot located on 852 Broadway in Myrtle Beach, South Carolina.

Carolina Southern Railroad was a member of the Carolina Rails system with connections that run from Whiteville, North Carolina, to Mullins, South Carolina, and also from Chadbourn, North Carolina, to Conway. Carolina Southern railroad was also responsible for operation of the Waccamaw Coast Line Railroad, which is a railway that runs from Conway to Myrtle Beach.

The railroad had over 95 miles of track, 11 engines, 10 cars, and the ability to transport freight materials in excess of 16,000 to 1.7 million tons or more.

== History ==
The company in the late 1980s, as the Mid-Atlantic Railroad, began operating two former Atlantic Coast Line Railroad branch lines. One was a portion of the now abandoned ACL line between Wilmington, North Carolina, and Whiteville, North Carolina, and the other was operated by the Waccamaw Coast Line from Conway, South Carolina, to Myrtle Beach, South Carolina. Commodities carried by the railroad are hot carbon dioxide (bottled), coal, wood products, stone, grain, agricultural chemicals, and processed food. Accessible to the line are industrial parks in Whiteville, North Carolina as well as east of Conway South Carolina. The railroad connects with CSX Transportation at Mullins.

In November 1985, Horry County, South Carolina purchased the Seaboard System Railroad line from Conway to Myrtle Beach. In 10/1987 the company was leased to the Waccamaw Coast Line Railroad for operations. In September 1996, the county decided to sell, and Carolina Southern, which began leasing the railroad line from the county, was the only bidder. The county turned down Carolina Southern's three bids, and by 1998, the city of Myrtle Beach showed interest.

In 1987, the South Carolina Department of Transportation declared the section east of the Pine Island Bridge over the Intracoastal Waterway to be unsafe. The state spent $4.2 million to restore the 50-year-old bridge, which reopened in summer 1997, pending implementation of Amtrak High Speed Rail service connecting at Florence, S.C. The first train crossed the bridge June 22, 2001, but Carolina Southern, still leasing from the county, had to spend $900,000 to bring the section east of the waterway up to the standards needed for regular service.

== Downfall ==
Though restored in the 1990s, much of the railroad was not in operation several decades later due to needed repairs. Carolina Southern Railroad was under a voluntary shutdown due to several bridges along the rail line requiring maintenance. The shutdown caused Carolina Southern to lay off nearly if not all of its employees, due to failing Federal Railroad Administration bridge inspections. On May 24, 2011, the Federal Railroad Administration (FRA) did a bridge inspection on both the Carolina Southern and Waccamaw Coastline Railroad (the Horry County portion of rail). A total 52 out of 187 bridges were inspected. and out of those inspected, seven bridges had critical defects. Carolina Southern voluntarily ceased operation on May 26, 2012, in order to hire a certified bridge engineer in order to inspect the critical bridges and prepare a plan for repairs and based on the engineer's recommendations, Carolina Southern made the required repairs to the problem bridges and resumed operations on August 8, 2011. On August 24, 2011, the FRA conducted another bridge inspection and at that time recommended the CSR cease operations until all of the bridges were repaired.

The county later applied for a federal grant, with plans to spend $7.5 million on the county's rail line. However, the TIGER grant application failed, leaving Horry County and Carolina Southern seeking other funding methods to upgrade their tracks. In February 2012, Carolina Southern announced that they would again seek funding through a different TIGER grant level to get the most important problems fixed. The railroad sold off some of its older passenger equipment to an Iowa short line due to lack of use or need for passenger equipment. As a freight railroad, the passenger cars were strictly for show and used only occasionally for company events.

On August 23, 2012, MyHorryNews reported that First Federal Bank was suing the owners of Carolina Southern Railroad because of unpaid debt of over $1 million. First Federal filed the lawsuit on August 7 against Ken Pippin; the debt stems from a 2008 loan that was provided by what was then Plantation Federal Bank. Pippin claimed that the debt problems had already been dealt with.

Officials from government and business considered it critical to have the presence of rail transportation not only to support current jobs, but to also facilitate expansion of existing businesses, the location of new businesses and the growth of jobs. Carolina Southern currently owns 93 miles of track in the counties with 2 being in South Carolina and 1 in North Carolina. After being shut down more than a year, the company had spent $400,000 on the seven bridges that had the worst problems, according to Jason Pippin, the railroad's general manager, and work had been completed on three of the bridges. He estimated that the work to repair the other four unsafe bridges would cost $1.5 million.

On September 29, 2012, it was announced that a committee was formed to find new ways to get the service back online; it consisted of members from Columbus County, North Carolina, Marion County, South Carolina and Horry County, South Carolina. On October 8, 2012, at a meeting in Loris, South Carolina, Carolina Southern owner Ken Pippin said that he did not have the money to make all the necessary improvements. The minimum amount that would be needed to get the railroad up and running again was estimated at $1.5 million and further improvements could add up beyond $12 million. Pippin, with the help of Horry County, had applied for federal grants, but had been turned down twice. Some of the committee members asked Pippin if he would be willing to sell the rail line and Pippin told WBTW that was not what he wanted; it was a family business that inherited a lot of problems, but they were able to cure those, and he was sure that they would be able to cure these.

== Possible sale ==
Several months later, the committee heard from a company that was interested in buying the line, according to committee co-chairman Doug Wendel. Wendel said the Pippin family had essentially abandoned the line, something Ken Pippin disputed. Wendel told the committee that the service is essential to the local area and went on to say that a lot of land along the line could be used by manufacturers if the railroad were up and running.

In May 2013, Norfolk Southern sued Carolina Southern for nearly $180,000 in unpaid rent on rail cars. This was increased to over $740,000 when Carolina Southern's attorney said the rail cars could not be returned. Also in 2013, Horry County declared Carolina Southern to be in default and cancelled its contract. The county had yet to sue for the $150,000 the railroad owes. County records showed that, while Ken Pippin was found in default on $400,000 in debt secured by a condominium, he owned three other condos worth $879,000. In February 2015, a federal judge ordered that Norfolk Southern be paid $103,826 plus the cost of moving the cars.

On March 6, 2014, an article posted on the My Horry News website stated that Carolina Southern could be bought by Palmetto Railways, a division of the state Department of Commerce, though according to local officials, getting all parties involved to agree on a price could be difficult. Wendel said a private purchaser would be more desirable.

On April 30, 2014, The Sun News reported that the two state committee trying to get Carolina Southern back in operation decided that it would need its own appraisal of Carolina Southern Railroad, The state did an appraisal for Carolina Southern due to the possible Palmetto Railways deal, but refused to share the appraisal with the committee, according to co-chairman Doug Wendel. The state did have its own appraisal done as it was considering purchasing Carolina Southern and making it a part of the state-owned Palmetto Railways. Pippin wanted to maintain ownership of seven miles of track around Mullins that freight into and out of the rest of the line would need toll travel to get to the national rail system.

On May 15, 2014, My Horry News announced that the owners of Carolina Southern Railroad delayed their plans to abandon tracks, so that state and local leaders could line up the money to buy the struggling railroad.

On July 23, 2014, it was reported that Carolina Southern Railroad agreed to begin the progress to abandoning all but seven miles of its track that are located in South Carolina and Columbus County. Area governments and Carolina Southern also announced a settlement that provides for a sale of the railroad, either at a price negotiated among the parties or one that is set by the Surface Transportation Board, asked the next day to dismiss with prejudice their complaint relating to Carolina Southern.

On August 6, 2014, it was reported that Carolina Southern Railroad could be under new management within six months. Committee co-chairmen Wendel and Dennis Worley planned to meet September 8 with the Pippins. Since Horry County would provide most of the money, County Council Chairman Mark Lazarus would also be there.

On August 20, 2014, it was reported that more work could be needed between North and South Carolina before a purchase of Carolina Southern. The problem was that any legislation in North Carolina was dependent on South Carolina passing the same law and that was not likely to happen until at least January.

On September 17, 2014, it was announced that most of the details on a possible purchase had been worked out; Wendel said the sale was to be complete by year end. It appeared the railroad would be purchased jointly by both North and South Carolina, but leased to a private operator.

On October 2, 2014, it was learned by Waccamaw Publishers that Santee Cooper was involved, with the possibility of the utility using the railroad easements to run natural gas pipelines from North Carolina into South Carolina.

On October 6, 2014, Columbus County approved $1.8 million in incentives for the rail line over a 10-year period. The next day Horry County Council approved $1.8 million in tax incentives but did not say where the money would come from. Lazarus said that while the rail line ran through Marion County, they were not financially involved in the project.

== Sale to R.J. Corman Railroad Group ==
R.J. Corman Railroad Co. filed papers with the U.S. Surface Transportation Board in January 2015 indicating completion of a sale of all but one mile of the railroad near Whiteville as of February 11, with the railroad expected to reopen "sometime during the summer." In a complaint filed March 6, 2015, Corman asked that Ken Pippin be required to sell Carolina Southern. Attorney Bill Hanna Jr. said the two state committee and Pippin had come to an agreement, and the committee assigned the agreement to Corman. Pippin denied any deal had been made.

The $13.9 million sale was to be complete by August 2015. Corman expected $2 million in work and another six months before operations resume. With 1600 employees in 23 states and a construction operation, Corman would be able to make the necessary upgrades. Pippin intended to keep the depot in Conway and said Carolina Southern would be a separate company. Corman planned for the railroad to deal with more businesses.

On August 17, 2015, it was announced that R.J. Corman Railroad Co. had closed on the multimillion-dollar purchase of Carolina Southern. Officials from Corman told media that the company had already taken possession of Carolina Southern on August 17 and that the company has already moved equipment into place two weeks before the deal was officially sealed in order to return the railroad to operation as soon as possible.

On April 6, 2016, the first train ran on the former Carolina Southern line in Horry County after $3 million in upgrades. However, trains could only run 10 MPH. On February 4, 2019, the county and R.J. Corman broke ground on $17.5 million in further upgrades funded in part by a $9.8 million TIGER grant. By 2022, trains where be able to run at 25 MPH.
