= Pine Island, South Carolina =

- Unincorporated community
- Location within South Carolina Location within the United States
- Coordinates: 33°44′12″N 78°55′33″W
- Country: United States
- State: South Carolina
- County: Horry
- Elevation: 26 ft (7.9 m)
- Time zone: UTC-5 (Eastern (EST))
  - Summer (DST): UTC-4 (EDT)
- ZIP Code: 29579
- Area codes: 843, 854
- GNIS feature ID: 1227961

Pine Island is an unincorporated community in Horry County, South Carolina, United States.

== History ==
=== As an experimental farm ===
Pine Island began as an experimental farm in the early 1900s, when the train to Myrtle Beach had been chartered from Conway to the Pine Island area. The train, originally built as the Conway Seashore Railroad, would eventually run to Myrtle Beach a year later. A store was constructed in the area, which provided feed for animals, fresh meat, and eggs. A lumber mill was built, which provided wood for Myrtle Beach's first buildings and structures, including the Seaside Inn, Myrtle Beach's first hotel. The experimental farm was managed as a factory, as the farm was laid off in tracts and records were kept. The experimental farm failed and the landowner had to sell.

=== Present day ===
Currently, the area of Pine Island has grown, constructing new residential developments, and a few industrial businesses.

== Geography ==
The community is located within the Carolina Forest CDP.
