= Mount Dora station =

- Old Mount Dora A. C. L. Railroad Station
- U.S. National Register of Historic Places
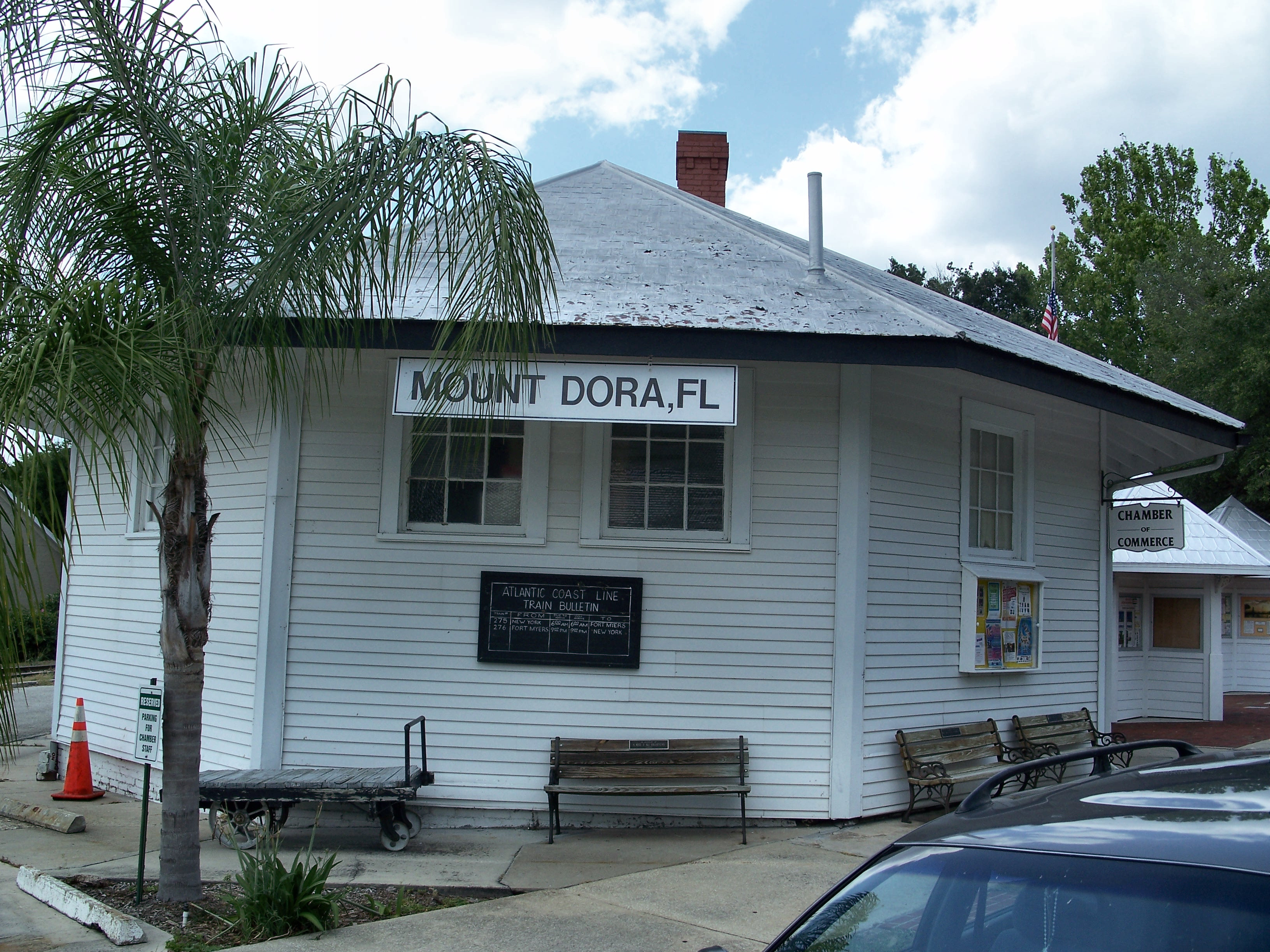
- The former Mount Dora A.C.L. station in May 2007.

- Location within Florida Location within the United States
- Location: Mount Dora, Florida
- Coordinates: 28°47′58″N 81°38′45″W
- NRHP reference No.: 92000099
- Added to NRHP: March 5, 1992

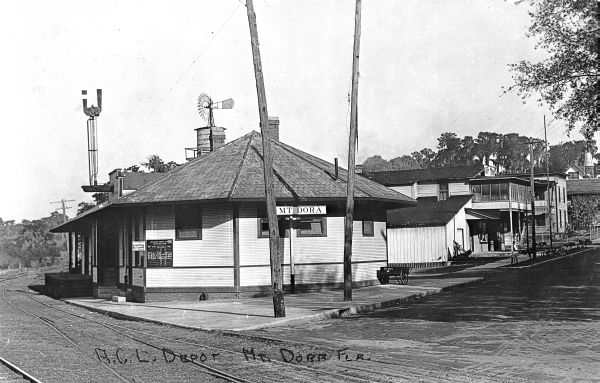
Mount Dora Depot in 1920

The Old Mount Dora A. C. L. Railroad Station (also known as the Mount Dora Chamber of Commerce) is a historic Atlantic Coast Line Railroad (ACL) depot in Mount Dora, Florida. It is located at 341 North Alexander Street. It was built by ACL in 1915, replacing an earlier depot built in 1895 when the line was part of the Plant System. The station's design, which includes elements of the Queen Anne and Romanesque Revival styles, is similar to other ACL stations of the era. The line was mainly used to ship citrus fruit and other agricultural products, though its passenger trains also brought tourists to the city. Passenger service ended in 1949, and the Mount Dora Chamber of Commerce bought the station in 1981. On March 5, 1992, the station was added to the U.S. National Register of Historic Places.

Preceding station	Atlantic Coast Line Railroad	Following station
Former services
Tavares toward Fort Mason	Fort Mason – Sanford	Sorrento toward Sanford
