= Dundee station (Florida) =

- Old Dundee ACL Railroad Depot
- U.S. National Register of Historic Places
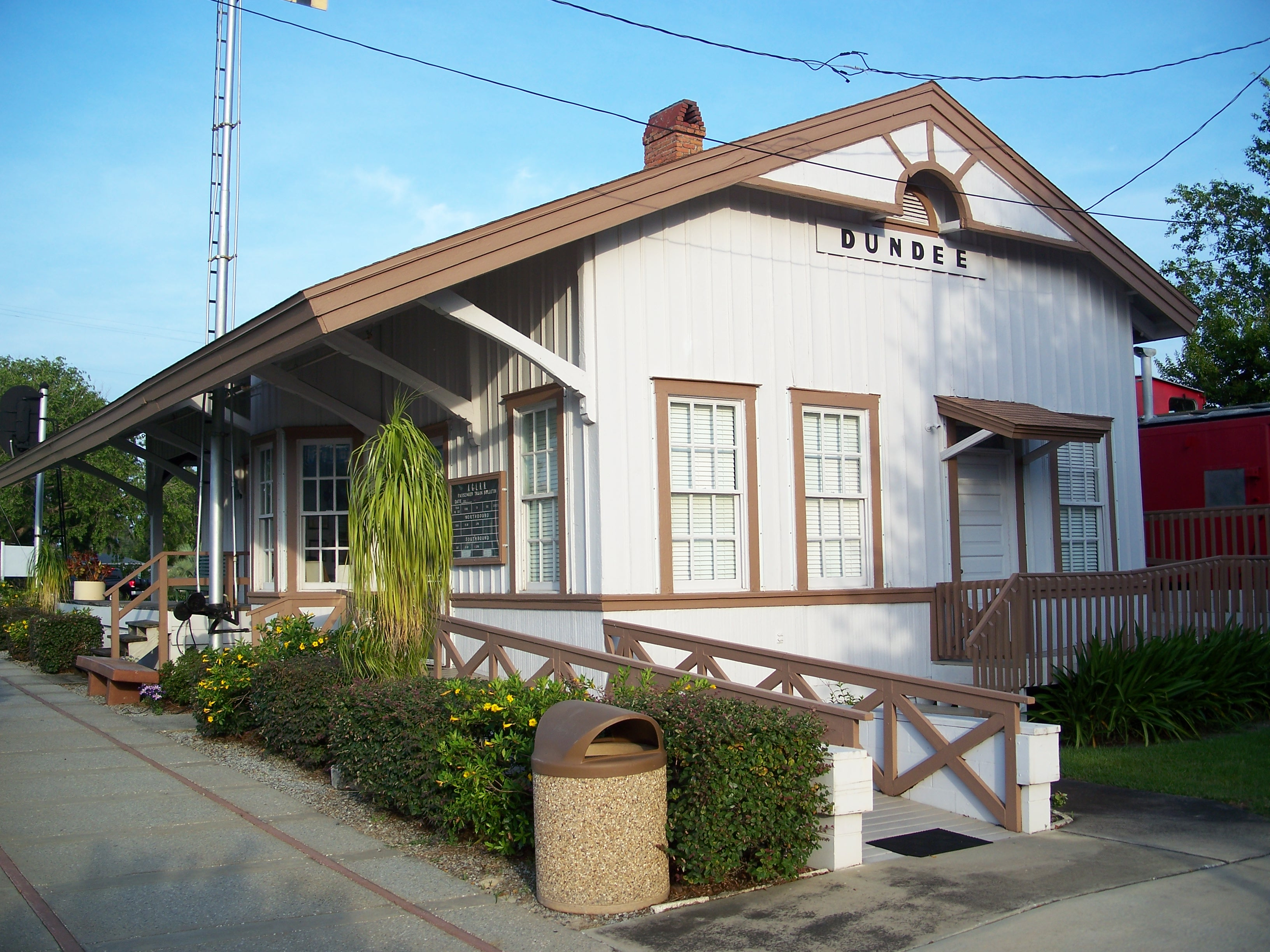

- Location within Florida Location within the United States
- Location: Dundee, Florida
- Coordinates: 28°1′19″N 81°37′19″W
- Built: 1912
- NRHP reference No.: 01000739
- Added to NRHP: July 30, 2001

Dundee station is a historic Atlantic Coast Line Railroad train station in Dundee, Florida. It is located at 103 Main Street. On July 30, 2001, it was added to the U.S. National Register of Historic Places.

The Dundee Depot Museum is located in the historic depot. In 2009, the museum was renamed the Margaret Kampsen Historic Dundee Depot Museum. The museum houses items of local and railroad history.

== Gallery ==
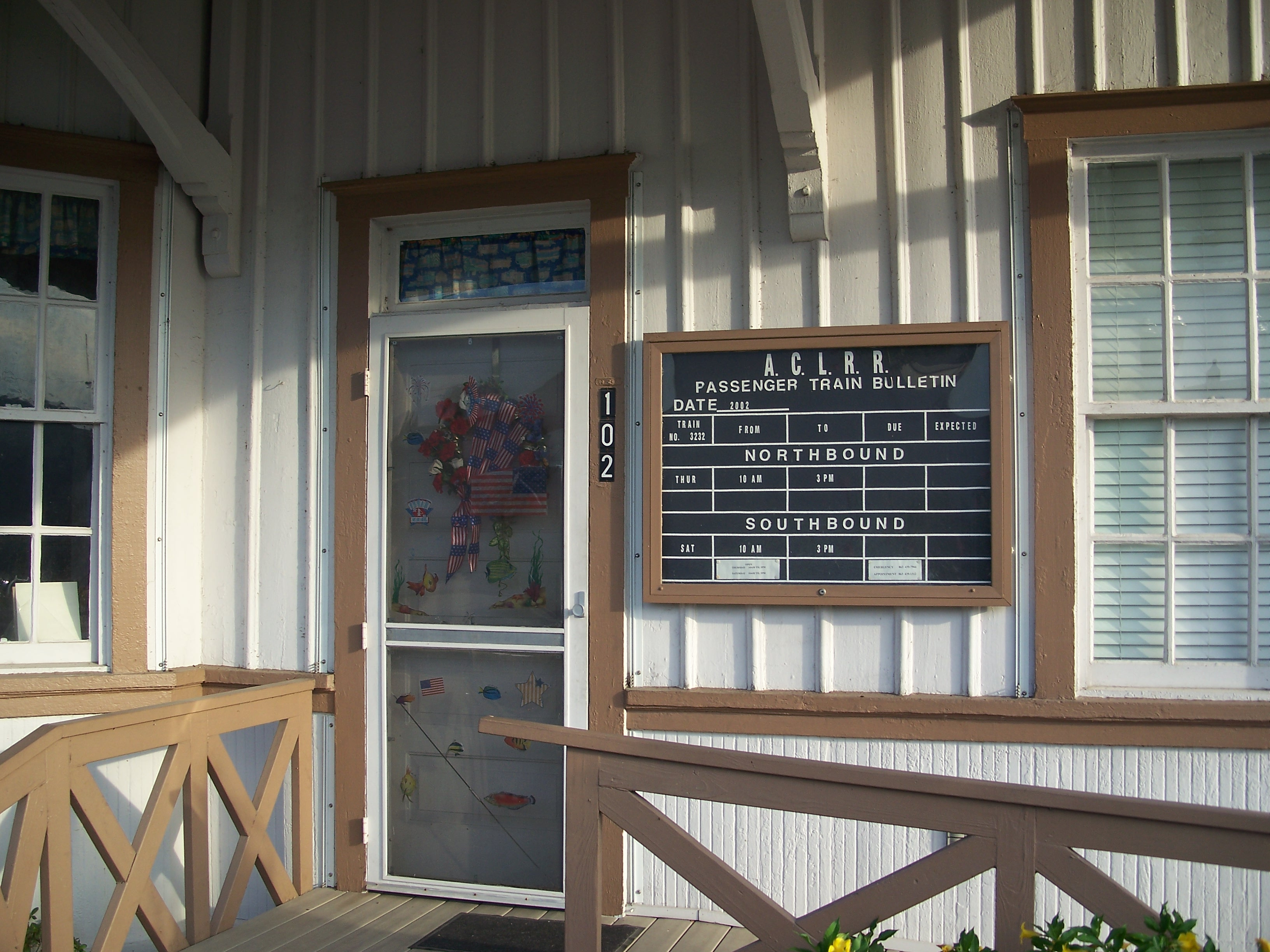

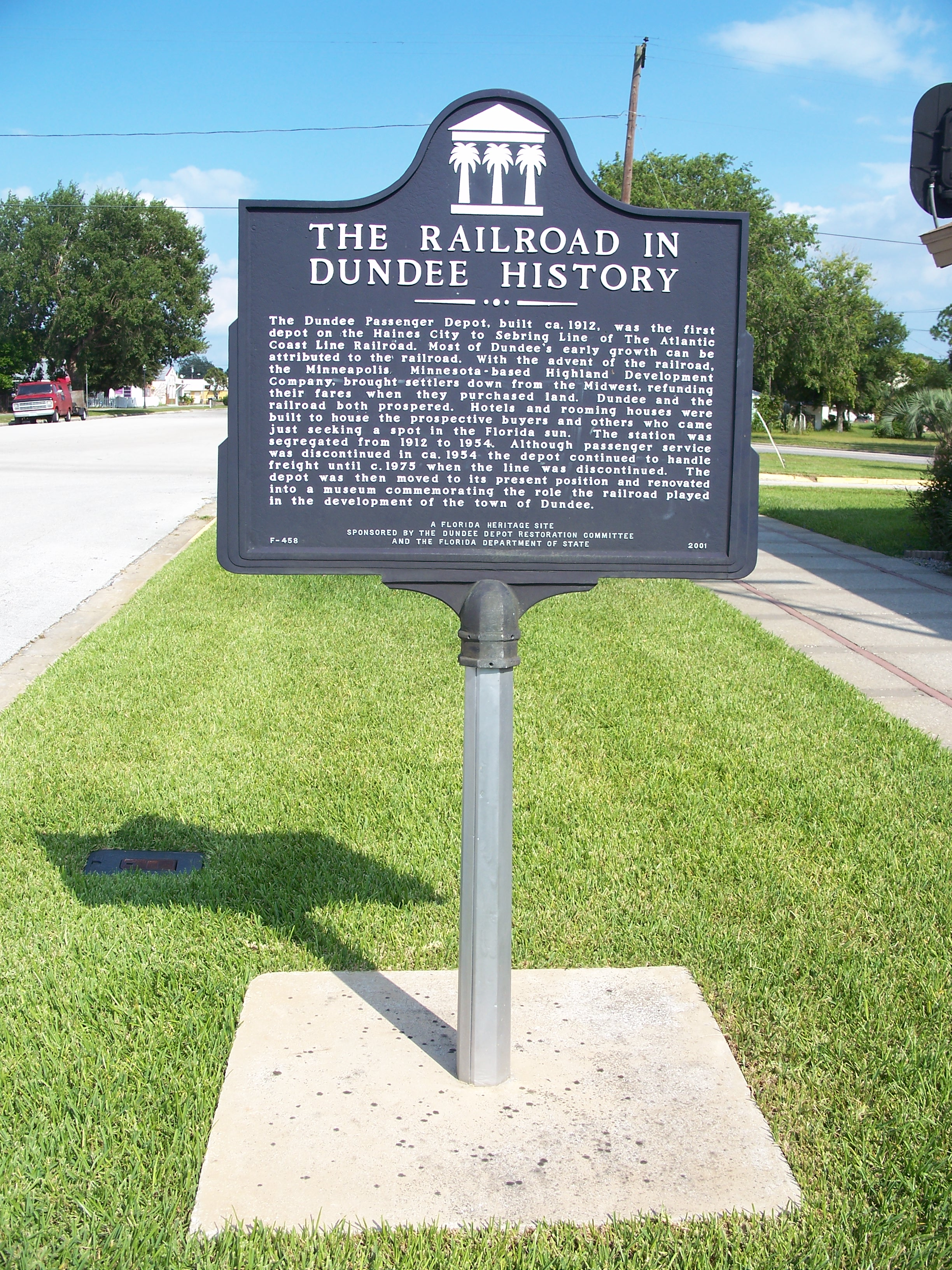

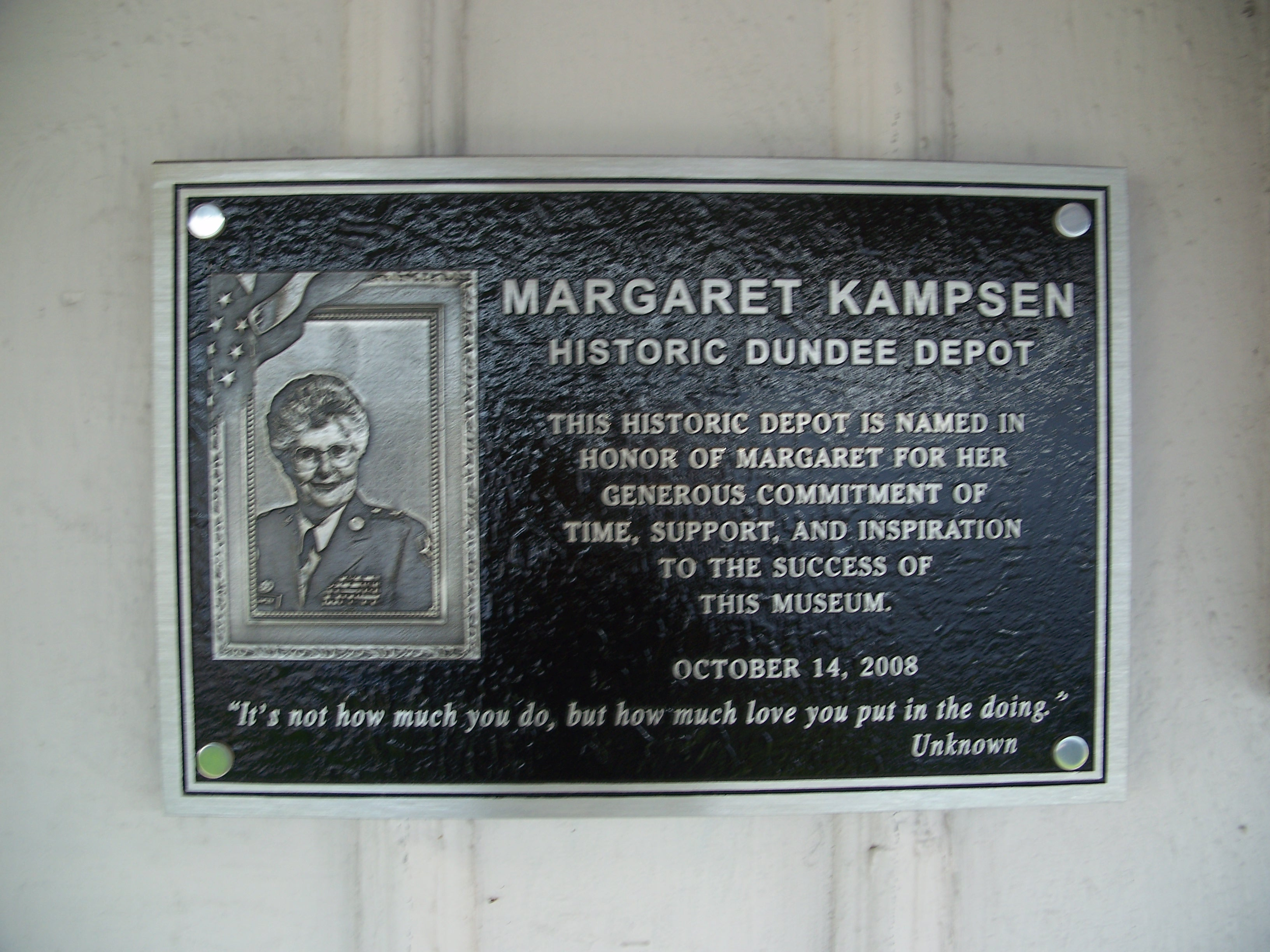

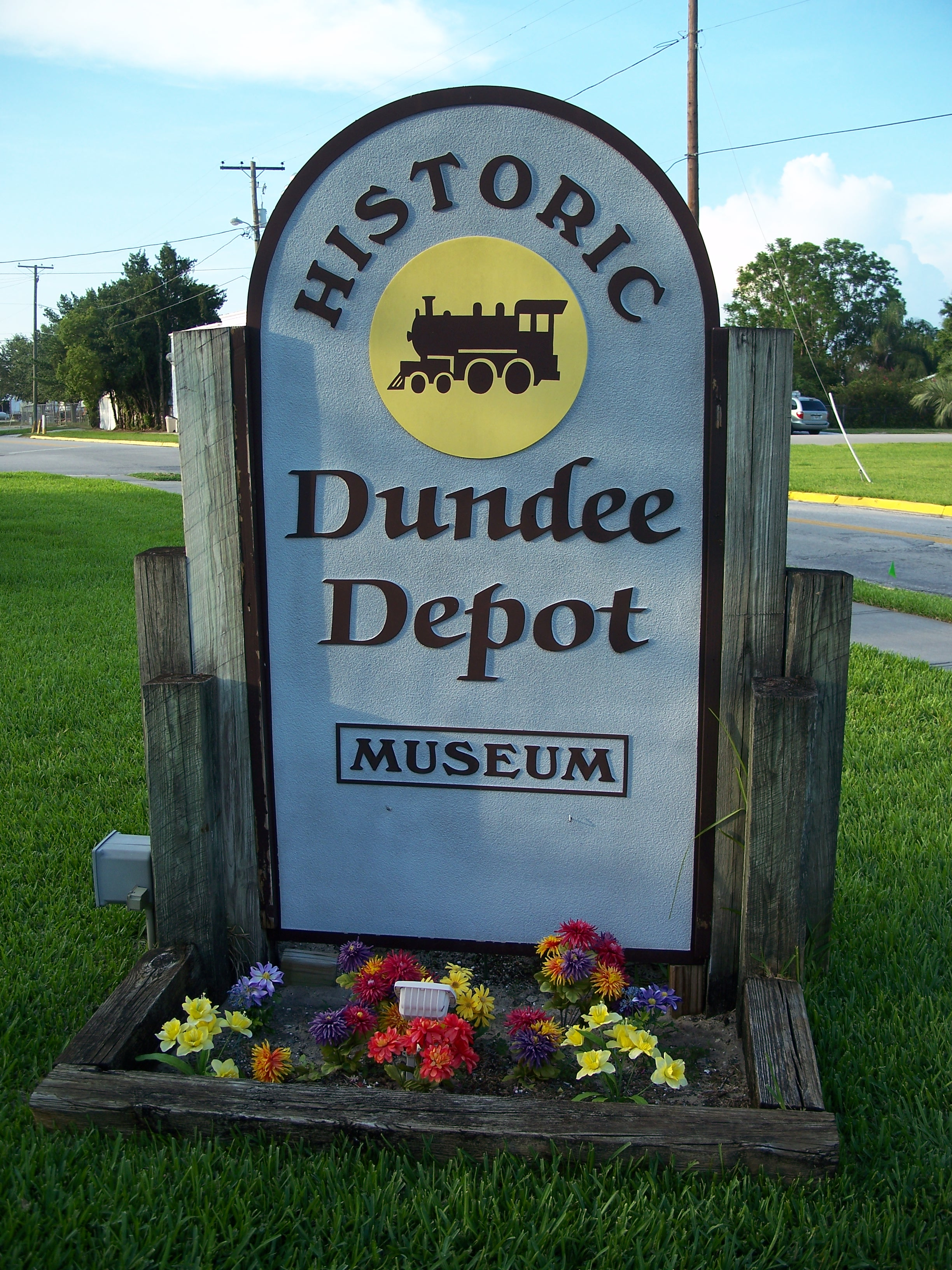

| Preceding station | Atlantic Coast Line Railroad | Following station |
|---|---|---|
| Lake Hamilton toward Haines City | Haines City – Everglades City | Waverly toward Everglades City |
