= Franklin Burroughs (businessman) =

American turpentine and naval entrepreneur

Franklin G. Burroughs (December 28, 1834, Martin County, North Carolina – February 25, 1897) was an American turpentine and naval entrepreneur who, along with Benjamin Grier Collins, founded the Burroughs and Collins company, later known as Burroughs and Chapin. The company was a major catalyst in growing the Grand Strand area in South Carolina and continues to play a major role in its economics.

Newspaper editor H.H. Woodward wrote in his obituary of Benjamin Collins that Burroughs moved to Conway, South Carolina and "established on the hill beyond the deep gully a country store with turpentine stills.” Collins moved to Conway after the Civil War and drove a turpentine wagon for Burroughs. They became business partners and opened stores around Horry County, South Carolina, with the Gully Store in Conway the largest. In the mid-1890s the men incorporated Burroughs and Collins Company which had an office on Main Street in Conway.

In 1874, Burroughs and Collins built a sawmill in Conway. According to Charles Joyner, Horry County was a major producer of turpentine in the years 1850 to 1880. The plentiful pine forests that had made this possible were gone. Joyner wrote that the producers of turpentine had leased their land rather than buying it, and as turpentine production moved to other states, Burroughs and Collins bought "enormous tracts of coastal property".
