= Chadbourn, North Carolina =

- Town
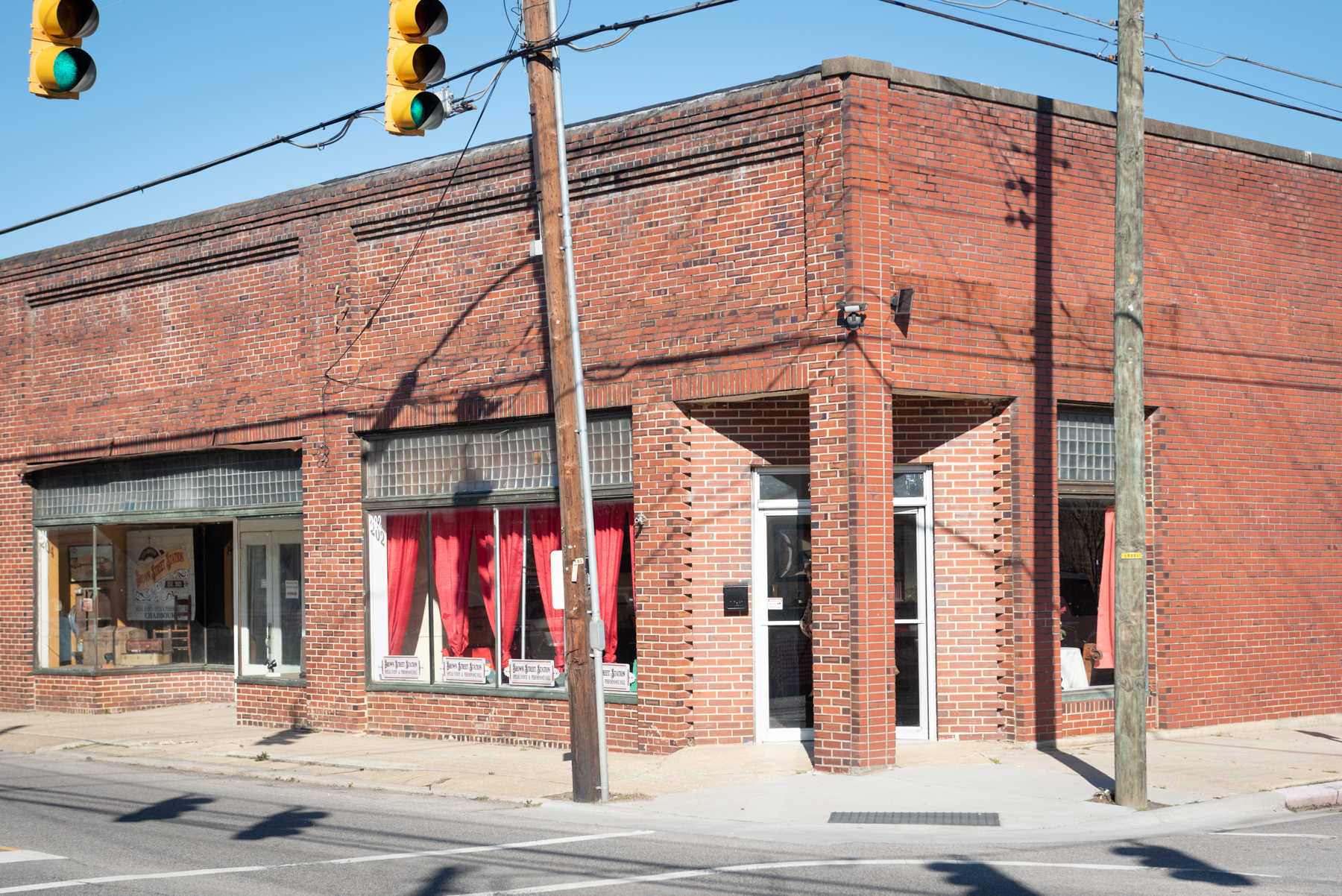
- Commercial buildings on North Brown Street

- Seal

- Location within the state of North Carolina
- Coordinates: 34°19′31″N 78°49′30″W
- Country: United States
- State: North Carolina
- County: Columbus

Government
  - Type: Town Council
  - Mayor: Phillip Britt

Area
  - Total: 2.60 sq mi (6.74 km^{2})
  - Land: 2.60 sq mi (6.74 km^{2})
  - Water: 0 sq mi (0.00 km^{2})
- Elevation: 102 ft (31 m)

Population (2020)
  - Total: 1,574
  - Density: 605.1/sq mi (233.62/km^{2})
- Time zone: UTC-5 (Eastern (EST))
  - Summer (DST): UTC-4 (EDT)
- ZIP code: 28431
- Area codes: 910, 472
- FIPS code: 37-11640
- GNIS feature ID: 2406253
- Website: www.townofchadbourn.com

Chadbourn is a town in Columbus County, North Carolina, United States. The population was 1,574 at the 2020 census.

== History ==
A post office called Chadbourn has been in operation since 1882. It was incorporated in 1883, being named after a local family engaged in the lumber industry.

== Geography ==
Chadbourn lies within the Carolina Border Belt, a regional network of tobacco markets and warehouses along both sides of the North Carolina-South Carolina border.

According to the United States Census Bureau, the town has a total area of 2.6 square miles (6.7 km^{2}), all land.

== Demographics ==
Historical population
Census	Pop.	Note	%±
1890	156		—
1900	243		55.8%
1910	1,242		411.1%
1920	1,121		−9.7%
1930	1,311		16.9%
1940	1,576		20.2%
1950	2,103		33.4%
1960	2,323		10.5%
1970	2,213		−4.7%
1980	1,975		−10.8%
1990	2,005		1.5%
2000	2,129		6.2%
2010	1,856		−12.8%
2020	1,574		−15.2%
U.S. Decennial Census

=== 2020 census ===
Chadbourn racial composition
Race	Number	Percentage
White (non-Hispanic)	469	29.8%
Black or African American (non-Hispanic)	976	62.01%
Native American	23	1.46%
Asian	9	0.57%
Other/Mixed	53	3.37%
Hispanic or Latino	44	2.8%

As of the 2020 census, Chadbourn had a population of 1,574. The median age was 41.6 years. 23.4% of residents were under the age of 18 and 20.5% were 65 years of age or older. For every 100 females, there were 81.5 males, and for every 100 females age 18 and over, there were 72.8 males age 18 and over.

In 2020, 0.0% of residents lived in urban areas and 100.0% lived in rural areas.

There were 693 households in Chadbourn, including 387 family households. Of all households, 28.6% had children under the age of 18 living in them. 24.7% were married-couple households, 21.1% were households with a male householder and no spouse or partner present, and 46.8% were households with a female householder and no spouse or partner present. About 38.8% of all households were made up of individuals, and 21.3% had someone living alone who was 65 years of age or older.

There were 845 housing units, of which 18.0% were vacant. The homeowner vacancy rate was 2.4% and the rental vacancy rate was 8.8%.

=== 2000 census ===
At the 2000 census there were 2,129 people, 877 households, and 548 families in the town. The population density was 805.3 inhabitants per square mile (310.9/km^{2}). There were 983 housing units at an average density of 371.8 per square mile (143.6/km^{2}). The racial makeup of the town was 53.55% African American, 41.94% White, 1.93% Native American, 0.38% Asian, 0.05% Pacific Islander, 1.41% from other races, and 0.75% from two or more races. Hispanic or Latino of any race were 1.97%.

Of the 877 households 27.6% had children under the age of 18 living with them, 35.3% were married couples living together, 24.4% had a female householder with no husband present, and 37.5% were non-families. 33.6% of households were one person and 14.3% were one person aged 65 or older. The average household size was 2.42 and the average family size was 3.12.

The age distribution was 28.4% under the age of 18, 9.0% from 18 to 24, 24.7% from 25 to 44, 22.5% from 45 to 64, and 15.4% 65 or older. The median age was 36 years. For every 100 females, there were 84.5 males. For every 100 females age 18 and over, there were 72.5 males.

The median household income was $24,539 and the median family income was $30,574. Males had a median income of $23,804 versus $20,270 for females. The per capita income for the town was $12,290. About 24.3% of families and 31.4% of the population were below the poverty line, including 45.5% of those under age 18 and 25.6% of those age 65 or over.

== Transportation ==
U.S. Route 76 passes through the northern part of the town. The old route of U.S. Route 74 passes east–west through Chadbourn. North Carolina Highway 410 moves north–south through the town.

Until 1955, the town was a transfer point for Atlantic Coast Line Railroad passenger trains to Myrtle Beach, South Carolina. At Chadbourn, connections could be made to trains bound for Florence, South Carolina, Sumter, South Carolina and Columbia's Union Station, Augusta, Georgia's Union Station to the west, and Wilmington to the east. The final passenger train through the town's station was the passenger train on an Augusta - Sumter - Florence - Chadbourn - Wilmington itinerary. Its final service was in 1965 or 1966, the station taking freight only station by late 1966.

== Works cited ==
- Powell, William S. (1976). The North Carolina Gazetteer: A Dictionary of Tar Heel Places. Chapel Hill: The University of North Carolina Press. ISBN 9780807812471.
