= National Register of Historic Places listings in Georgetown County, South Carolina =

Location of Georgetown County in South Carolina

This is a list of the National Register of Historic Places listings in Georgetown County, South Carolina.

This is intended to be a complete list of the properties and districts on the National Register of Historic Places in Georgetown County, South Carolina, United States. The locations of National Register properties and districts for which the latitude and longitude coordinates are included below, may be seen in a map.

There are 40 properties and districts listed on the National Register in the county, including 3 National Historic Landmarks. One of the National Historic Landmarks, Atalaya and Brookgreen Gardens, is composed of two parts that are listed on the Register separately. Another property was once listed but has been removed.

This National Park Service list is complete through NPS recent listings posted May 1, 2026.

== Current listings ==
| | Name on the Register | Image | Date listed | Location | City or town | Description |
|---|---|---|---|---|---|---|
| 1 | All Saints' Episcopal Church, Waccamaw | All Saints' Episcopal Church, Waccamaw | March 13, 1991 (#91000232) | South Carolina Highway 255 0.2 miles north of its junction with South Carolina Highway 46; 33°28′03″N 79°08′24″W | Pawleys Island | |
| 2 | Annandale Plantation | Annandale Plantation | October 25, 1973 (#73001709) | About 14 miles south of Georgetown between South Carolina Highways 18 and 30; 33°13′01″N 79°18′10″W | Georgetown | |
| 3 | Arcadia Plantation | Arcadia Plantation | January 3, 1978 (#78002509) | 5 miles (8 km) east of Georgetown off U.S. Route 17; 33°23′01″N 79°13′25″W | Georgetown | |
| 4 | Atalaya | Atalaya | September 7, 1984 (#84002045) | Off U.S. Route 17; 33°30′50″N 79°05′07″W | Murrells Inlet | |
| 5 | Battery White | Battery White | November 16, 1977 (#77001222) | South of Georgetown on Belle Isle Rd. 33°18′13″N 79°17′46″W | Georgetown | |
| 6 | Belle Isle Rice Mill Chimney | | October 3, 1988 (#88000525) | Cat Island; 33°12′02″N 79°15′30″W | Georgetown | |
| 7 | Beneventum Plantation House | Beneventum Plantation House | October 3, 1988 (#88000526) | Off County Road 431; 33°26′43″N 79°15′39″W | Georgetown | |
| 8 | Black River Plantation House | Black River Plantation House | March 2, 1994 (#94000062) | Southwestern side of South Carolina Highway 51, 0.5 miles northwest of Peters Creek; 33°30′37″N 79°18′01″W | Georgetown | |
| 9 | Brookgreen Gardens | Brookgreen Gardens | April 15, 1978 (#78002510) | 18 miles (28.8 km) northeast of Georgetown on U.S. Route 17; 33°31′14″N 79°05′59″W | Georgetown | |
| 10 | Cedar Grove Plantation Chapel | Cedar Grove Plantation Chapel | March 13, 1991 (#91000231) | South Carolina Highway 255, 0.2 miles north of its junction with South Carolina Highway 46; 33°28′02″N 79°08′19″W | Pawleys Island | |
| 11 | Chicora Wood Plantation | Chicora Wood Plantation | April 11, 1973 (#73001710) | 12 miles northeast of Georgetown on County Road 52; 33°31′03″N 79°10′32″W | Georgetown | |
| 12 | Fairfield Rice Mill Chimney | | October 3, 1988 (#88000527) | Off U.S. Route 17; 33°23′33″N 79°13′11″W | Georgetown | |
| 13 | Friendfield Plantation | Friendfield Plantation | April 12, 1996 (#96000409) | Roughly bounded by U.S. Route 521-17A, the Sampit River, Whites Creek, and Creek Rd. 33°22′39″N 79°20′29″W | Georgetown | |
| 14 | Georgetown Historic District | Georgetown Historic District | October 14, 1971 (#71000781) | Along the northern side of the Sampit River; 33°21′58″N 79°16′51″W | Georgetown | |
| 15 | Georgetown Lighthouse | Georgetown Lighthouse | December 30, 1974 (#74001857) | On North Island, about 12 miles southeast of Georgetown; 33°13′20″N 79°11′07″W | Georgetown | |
| 16 | Hobcaw Barony | Hobcaw Barony | November 2, 1994 (#94001236) | Roughly bounded by U.S. Route 17, Winyah and Mud Bays and Jones Creek; 33°19′23″N 79°13′06″W | Georgetown | |
| 17 | Holy Cross Faith Memorial School | | May 21, 2024 (#100010366) | 88 Baskervill Drive; 33°27′46″N 79°06′50″W | Pawleys Island vicinity | |
| 18 | Hopsewee | Hopsewee | January 25, 1971 (#71000782) | 12 miles south of Georgetown on U.S. Route 17; 33°12′38″N 79°23′05″W | Georgetown | |
| 19 | Keithfield Plantation | | October 3, 1988 (#88000529) | Off County Road 52; 33°26′21″N 79°14′31″W | Georgetown | |
| 20 | Mansfield Plantation | Mansfield Plantation | December 6, 1977 (#77001223) | 5 miles north of Georgetown off U.S. Route 701; 33°26′05″N 79°15′33″W | Georgetown | |
| 21 | Milldam Rice Mill and Rice Barn | | October 3, 1988 (#88000530) | Off County Road 30; 33°12′09″N 79°19′58″W | Georgetown | |
| 22 | Minim Island Shell Midden (38GE46) | | August 18, 1982 (#82003852) | Address Restricted | Georgetown | |
| 23 | Murrells Inlet Historic District | Murrells Inlet Historic District | November 25, 1980 (#80003670) | Off U.S. Route 17; 33°33′44″N 79°01′14″W | Murrells Inlet | |
| 24 | Nightingale Hall Rice Mill Chimney | | October 3, 1988 (#88000531) | Off County Road 52; 33°26′46″N 79°12′46″W | Georgetown | |
| 25 | Old Market Building | Old Market Building | December 3, 1969 (#69000166) | Front and Screven Sts. 33°21′56″N 79°16′57″W | Georgetown | |
| 26 | Parrish's Motor Court | Parrish's Motor Court | October 16, 2017 (#100001748) | 5098 US 17 Bus. 33°32′08″N 79°03′15″W | Murrells Inlet | |
| 27 | Pawleys Island Historic District | Pawleys Island Historic District | November 15, 1972 (#72001211) | Western side of Pawleys Island; 33°25′26″N 79°07′50″W | Pawleys Island | |
| 28 | Pee Dee River Rice Planters Historic District | Pee Dee River Rice Planters Historic District | October 3, 1988 (#88000532) | Along the Pee Dee and Waccamaw Rivers; also 1 Ave. of Live Oaks; 33°30′13″N 79°10′11″W | Georgetown | 1 Ave of Live Oaks was listed as a boundary increase to the district on October 16, 2020 |
| 29 | Pleasant Hill Consolidated School | Pleasant Hill Consolidated School | April 30, 1998 (#98000421) | 11957 Pleasant Hill Dr. 33°40′44″N 79°22′07″W | Hemingway | |
| 30 | Prince Frederick's Chapel Ruins | Prince Frederick's Chapel Ruins | August 28, 1974 (#74001858) | Southeast of Plantersville on County Road 52; 33°30′20″N 79°10′49″W | Plantersville | |
| 31 | Prince George Winyah Church (Episcopal) and Cemetery | Prince George Winyah Church (Episcopal) and Cemetery | May 6, 1971 (#71000783) | Corner of Broad and Highmarket Sts. 33°22′08″N 79°16′49″W | Georgetown | |
| 32 | Joseph H. Rainey House | Joseph H. Rainey House | April 20, 1984 (#84003877) | 909 Prince St. 33°22′08″N 79°17′05″W | Georgetown | |
| 33 | Richmond Hill Plantation Archeological Sites | | October 6, 1988 (#88000537) | Address Restricted | Murrells Inlet | |
| 34 | Rural Hall Plantation House | | October 3, 1988 (#88000533) | Off County Road 179; 33°30′46″N 79°20′40″W | Georgetown | |
| 35 | Sandy Island School | | October 5, 2020 (#100005641) | 32 Sandy Island Rd. 33°31′13″N 79°07′46″W | Sandy Island | |
| 36 | Summer Chapel Rectory, Prince Frederick's Episcopal Church | Summer Chapel Rectory, Prince Frederick's Episcopal Church | October 3, 1988 (#88000536) | County Road 52; 33°33′18″N 79°12′53″W | Plantersville | |
| 37 | Summer Chapel, Prince Frederick's Episcopal Church | Summer Chapel, Prince Frederick's Episcopal Church | October 3, 1988 (#88000535) | County Road 52; 33°33′17″N 79°12′42″W | Plantersville | |
| 38 | Weehaw Rice Mill Chimney | | October 3, 1988 (#88000534) | Off County Road 325; 33°24′18″N 79°16′04″W | Georgetown | |
| 39 | Wicklow Hall Plantation | Wicklow Hall Plantation | August 29, 1978 (#78002511) | South of Georgetown on South Carolina Highway 30; 33°12′50″N 79°18′56″W | Georgetown | |
| 40 | Winyah Indigo School | Winyah Indigo School | November 3, 1988 (#88002386) | 1200 Highmarket St. 33°22′22″N 79°17′11″W | Georgetown | |

== Former listing ==
| | Name on the Register | Image | Date listed | Date removed | Location | City or town | Description |
|---|---|---|---|---|---|---|---|
| 1 | China Grove | | March 25, 1982 (#82003851) | March 15, 2000 | | Georgetown | Burned |

== See also ==
- List of National Historic Landmarks in South Carolina
- National Register of Historic Places listings in South Carolina
