= Georgetown, South Carolina =

- City
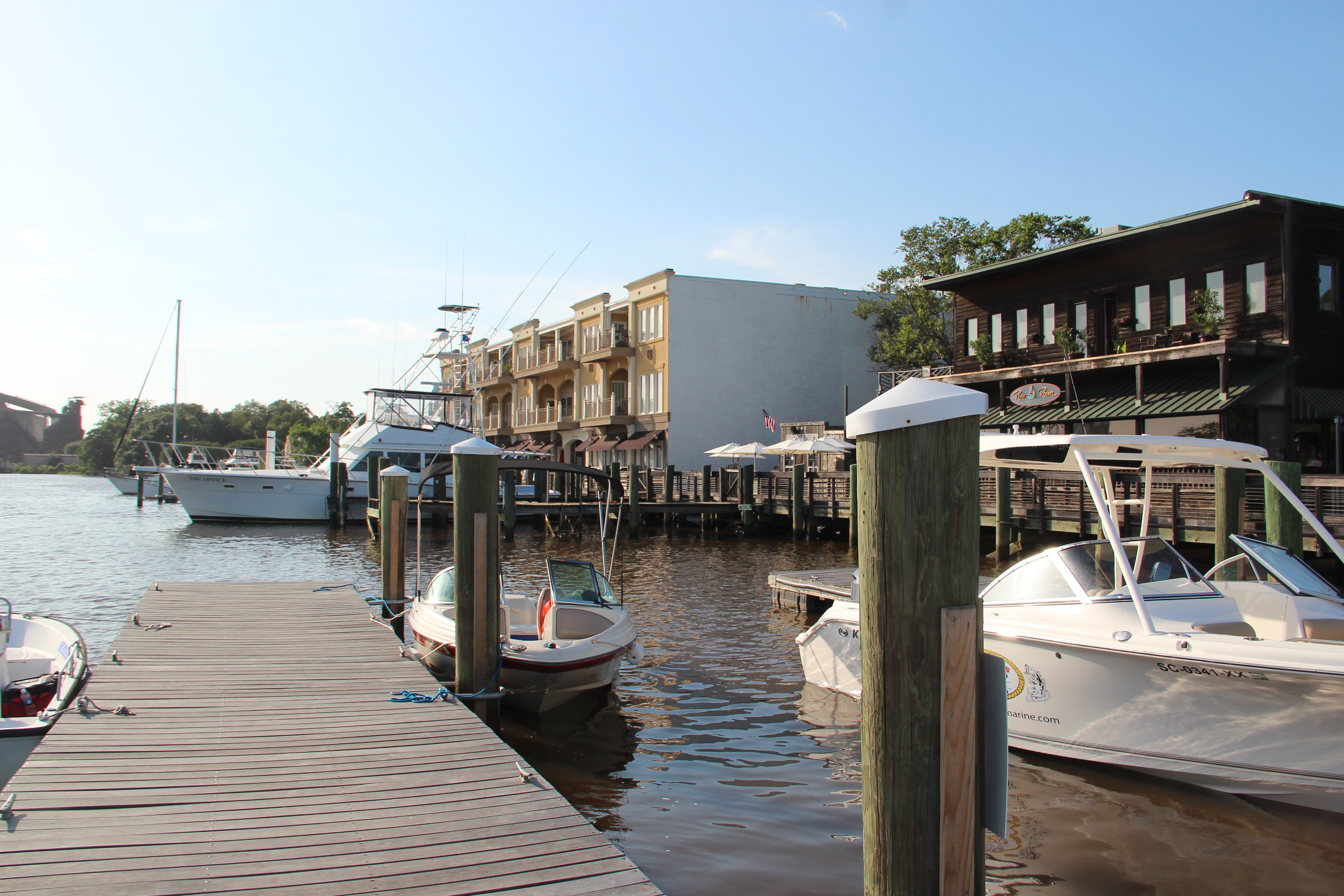
- Georgetown harbor

- Seal

- Location in Georgetown County and the state of South Carolina
- Coordinates: 33°22′28″N 79°17′38″W
- Country: United States
- State: South Carolina
- County: Georgetown
- Incorporated: 1729 (297 years ago)

Government
  - Mayor: Jay Doyle (FWD)

Area
  - Total: 7.59 sq mi (19.65 km^{2})
  - Land: 6.99 sq mi (18.11 km^{2})
  - Water: 0.59 sq mi (1.54 km^{2})
- Elevation: 3 ft (0.91 m)

Population (2020)
  - Total: 8,403
  - Density: 1,201.8/sq mi (464.02/km^{2})
- Time zone: UTC−5 (EST)
  - Summer (DST): UTC−4 (EDT)
- ZIP Codes: 29440, 29442
- Area codes: 843, 854
- FIPS code: 45-28870
- GNIS feature ID: 2403690
- Website: www.georgetownsc.gov

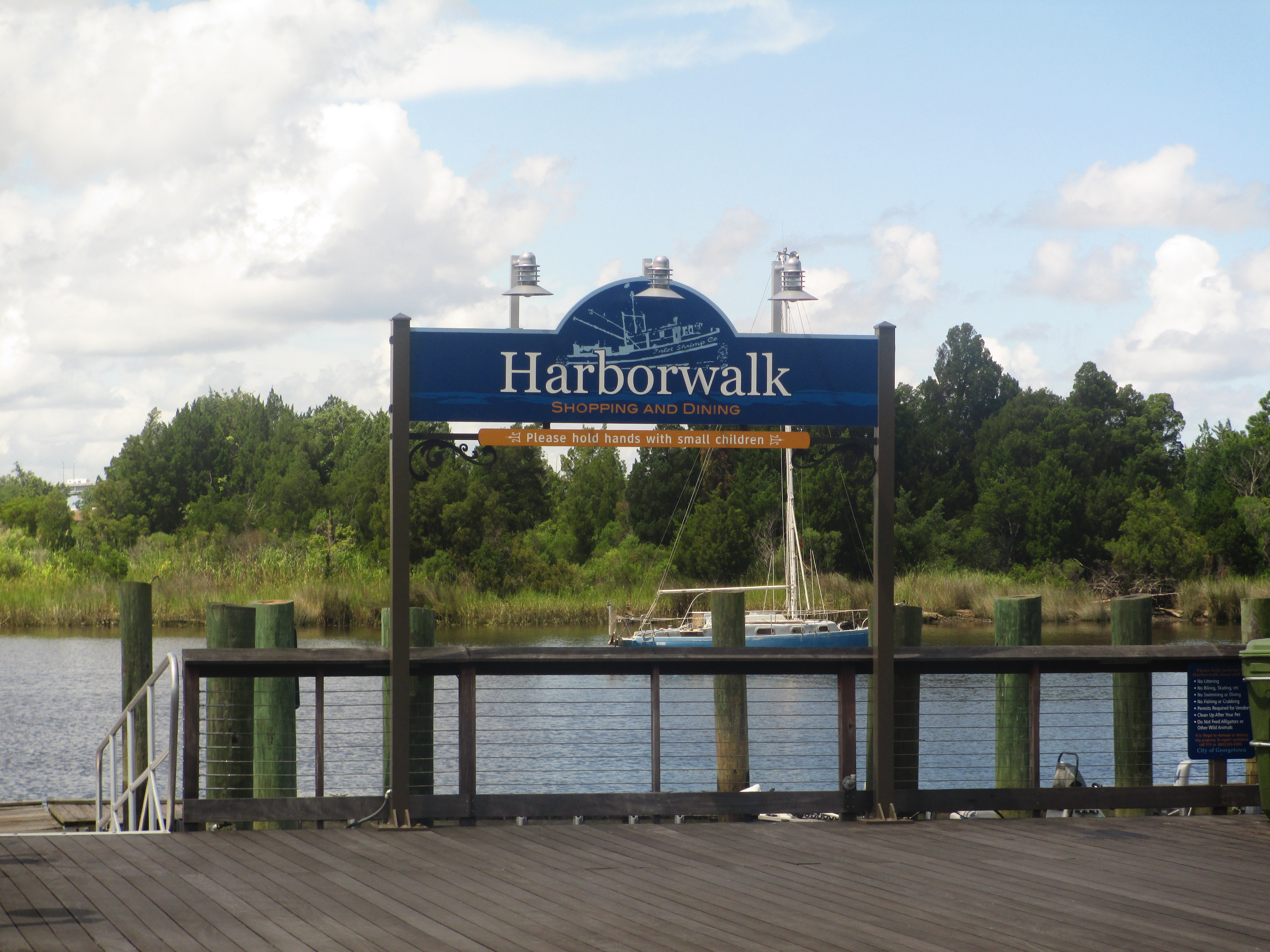
The Harborwalk

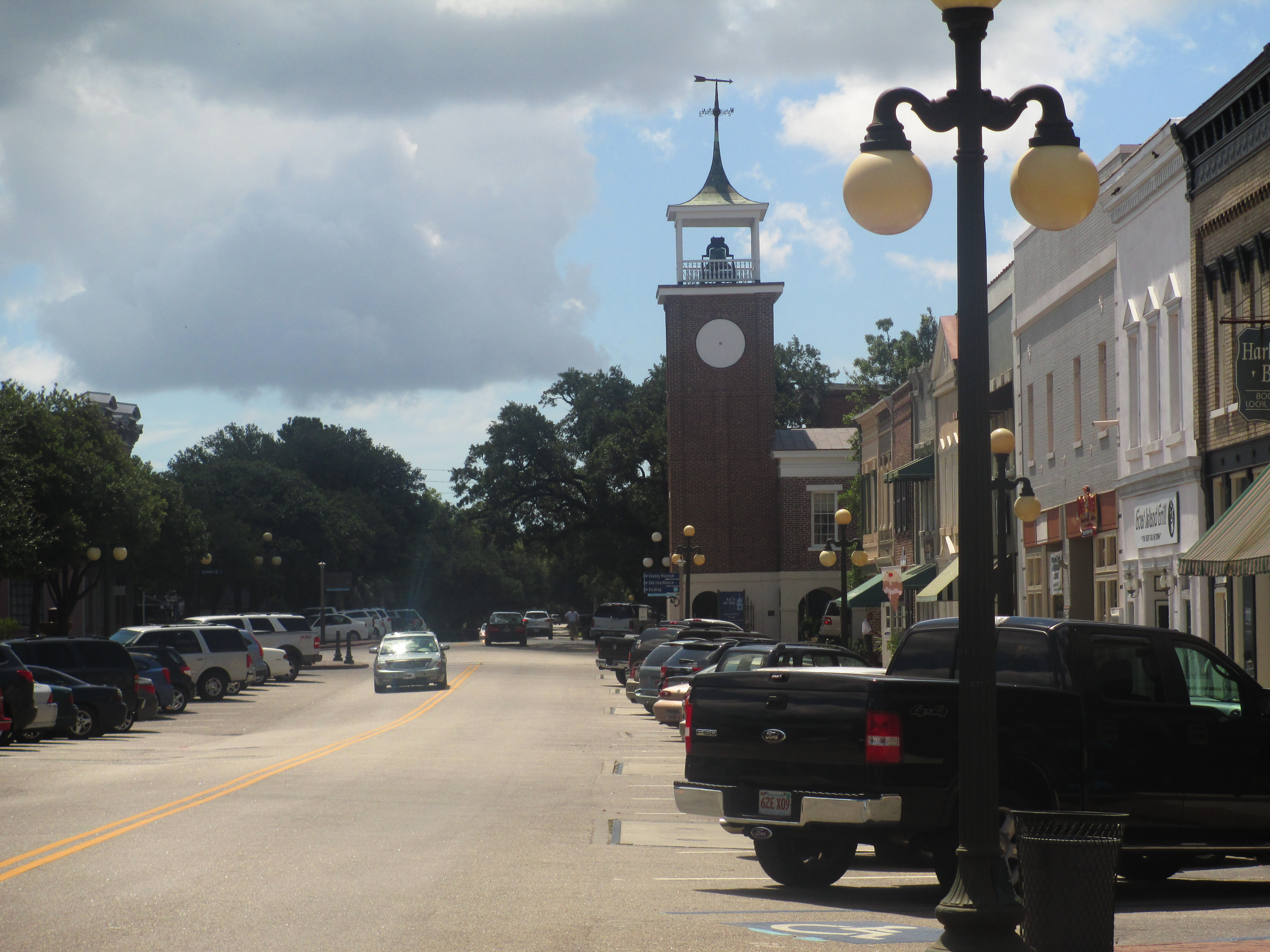
A glimpse of downtown Georgetown, looking north from Francis Marion Park

Georgetown is the third-oldest city in the U.S. state of South Carolina and the county seat of Georgetown County, in the Lowcountry. As of the 2020 census it had a population of 8,403, a decrease from the 2010 census of 9,163. Located on Winyah Bay at the confluence of the Black, Great Pee Dee, Waccamaw, and Sampit rivers, Georgetown is the second largest seaport in South Carolina, handling over 960,000 tons of materials a year, while Charleston is the largest.

Beginning in the colonial era, Georgetown was the commercial center of an indigo- and rice-producing area. Rice replaced indigo as the chief commodity crop in the antebellum era. A timber industry also developed and sawmills were built.

== History ==
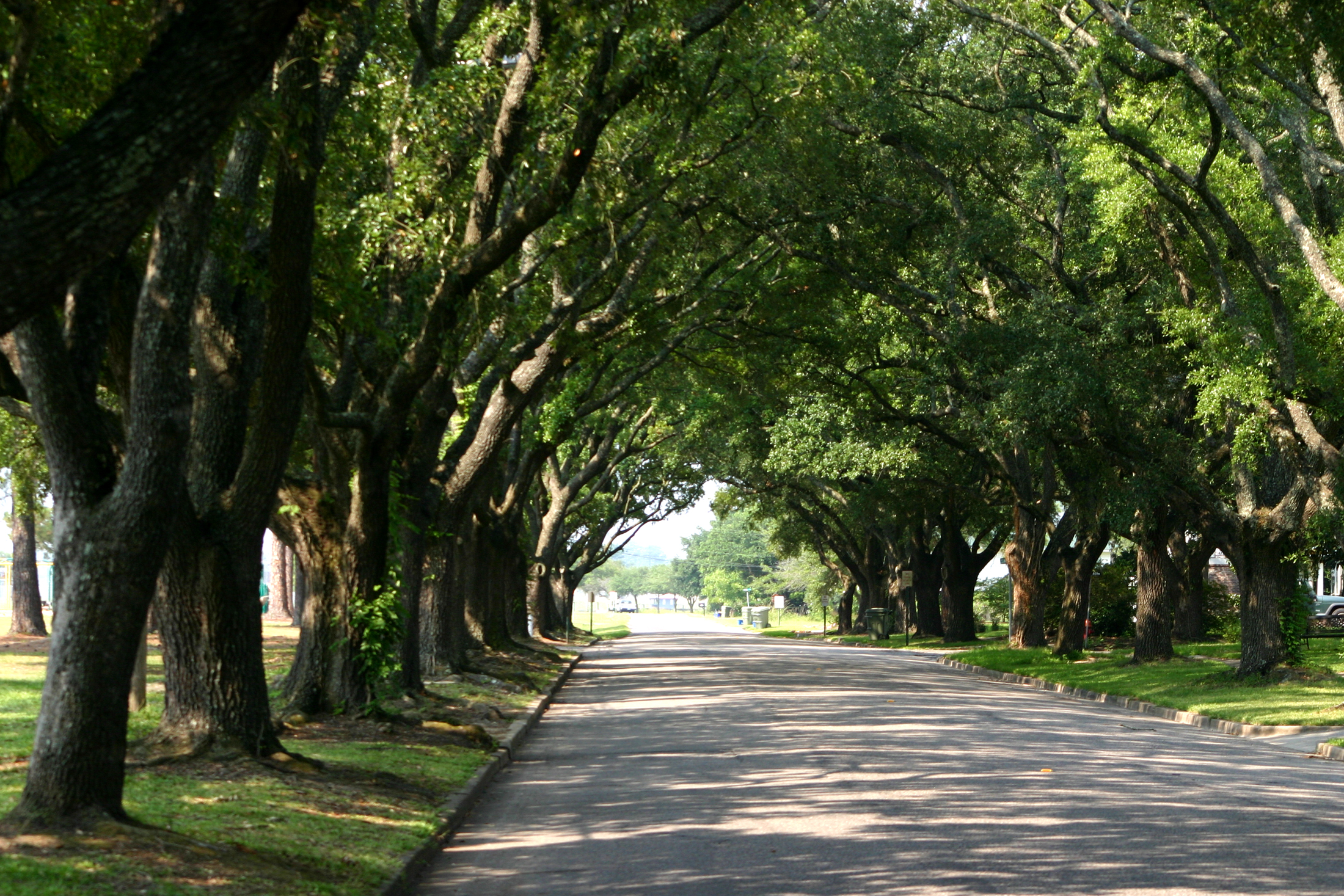
Most of the older neighborhoods were planted with allées of southern live oaks, such as these on East Bay Street.

=== Pre-Revolution ===
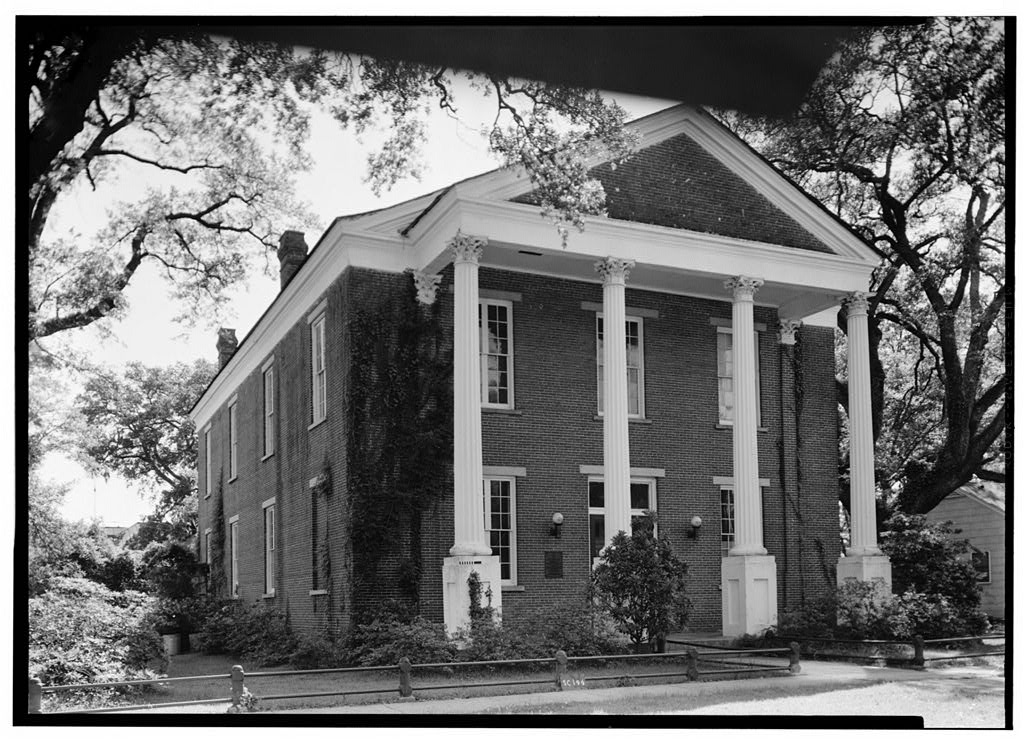
Winyah Indigo Society Hall

In 1526 a Spanish expedition under Lucas Vázquez de Ayllón founded a colony on Waccamaw Neck called San Miguel de Guadalupe. The settlers included enslaved Africans, and was the first European settlement in North America with African slaves. The colony failed for multiple reasons, including a fever epidemic and a revolt of the slaves. The Africans escaped and joined members of the indigenous Cofitachequi chiefdom in the area, people of the late Mississippian culture.

The next settlement in the area was made by English colonists. After settling Charles Town in 1670, the English established trade with regional Indian tribes. Trading posts in outlying areas quickly developed as settlements.

By 1721 the colonial government granted the English residents' petition to found a new parish, Prince George, Winyah, on the Black River. In 1734, Prince George, Winyah was divided; and the newly created Prince Frederick Parish congregation occupied the church at Black River. Prince George Parish, Winyah encompassed the new town of Georgetown that was developing on the Sampit River.

In 1729, Elisha Screven laid the plan for Georgetown and developed the city in a four-by-eight block grid. The original grid city is listed as a historic district on the National Register of Historic Places. It bears the original street names, lot numbers, and has many original homes.

Soon after Georgetown was established, the Indian trade declined. Many traders made longer trips to the interior of the upper rivers, for instance to Cherokee Country. In the Lowcountry, plantation owners developed large plantations and cultivated indigo as the cash commodity crop, with rice as a secondary crop. Both were labor-intensive and dependent on enslaved Africans and African Americans, the former imported from Africa in the Atlantic slave trade. Agricultural profits were so great between 1735 and 1775 that in 1757 the Winyah Indigo Society, whose members paid dues in indigo, opened and maintained the first public school for white children between Charles Town and Wilmington. By the early 19th century, rice replaced indigo as the chief commodity crop. It became a staple of regional diets as well, becoming characteristic in the area.

In the American Revolution, the Georgetown planter, Thomas Lynch Jr., signed the Declaration of Independence. During the final years of the conflict, Georgetown was the important port for supplying General Nathanael Greene's army. Francis Marion (the "Swamp Fox") led many guerrilla actions in the vicinity.

=== Antebellum period ===
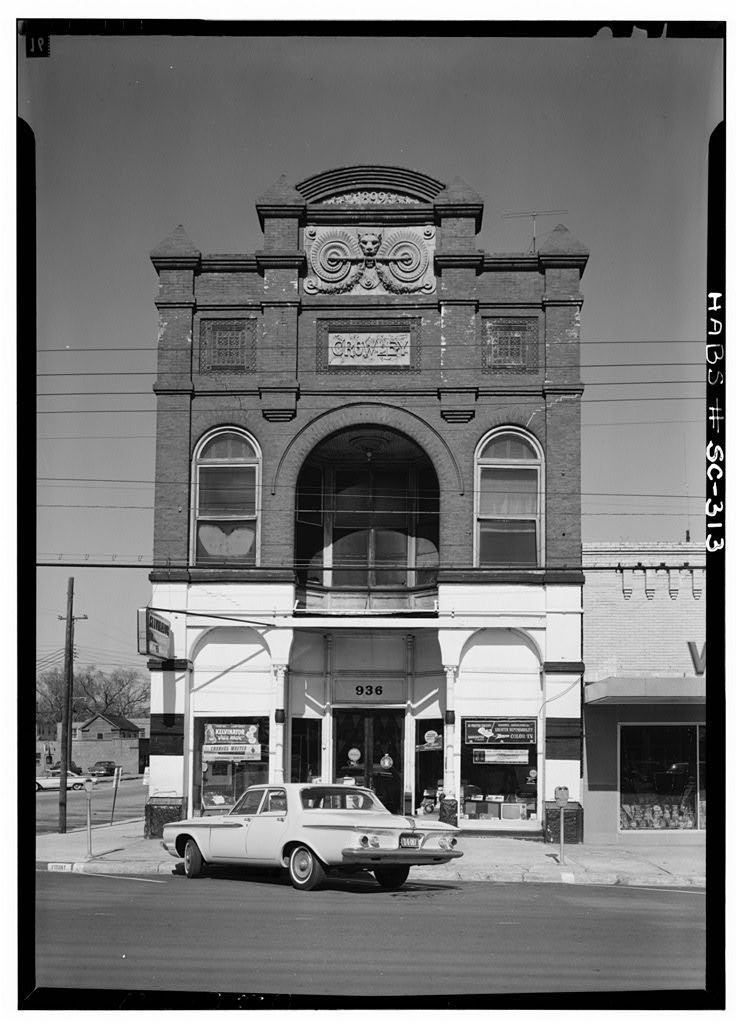
Crowley Store

Georgetown had a large population of Jewish-Americans in the early 1800s. Following the American Revolution, rice surpassed indigo as the staple crop. It was cultivated in the swampy lowlands along the rivers, where enslaved African and African-American laborers built large earthworks: dams, gates and canals to irrigate and drain the rice fields during cultivation. Large rice plantations were established around Georgetown along its five rivers. Planters often had chosen to import slaves from rice-growing regions of West Africa, as they knew the technology for cultivation and processing.

By 1840, the Georgetown District (later County) produced nearly one-half of the total rice crop of the United States. It became the largest rice-exporting port in the world. Wealth from the rice created an elite European-American planter class; they built stately plantation manor houses and often also had townhouses in the city, bought elegant furniture and other furnishings, and extended generous hospitality to others of their class. Their relatively leisured lifestyle for a select few, built on the labor of thousands of slaves, was disrupted by the Civil War. Afterward the abolition of slavery and transformation to a free labor market in the South so changed the economics of rice production as to make the labor-intensive process unprofitable. The soft silt soil of the South Carolina low country required harvesting rice by hand. In addition, the disruption and destruction of the war delayed the resumption of agriculture in the South. Nationally, the economy struggled in the 1870s, adding to pressures on agriculture.

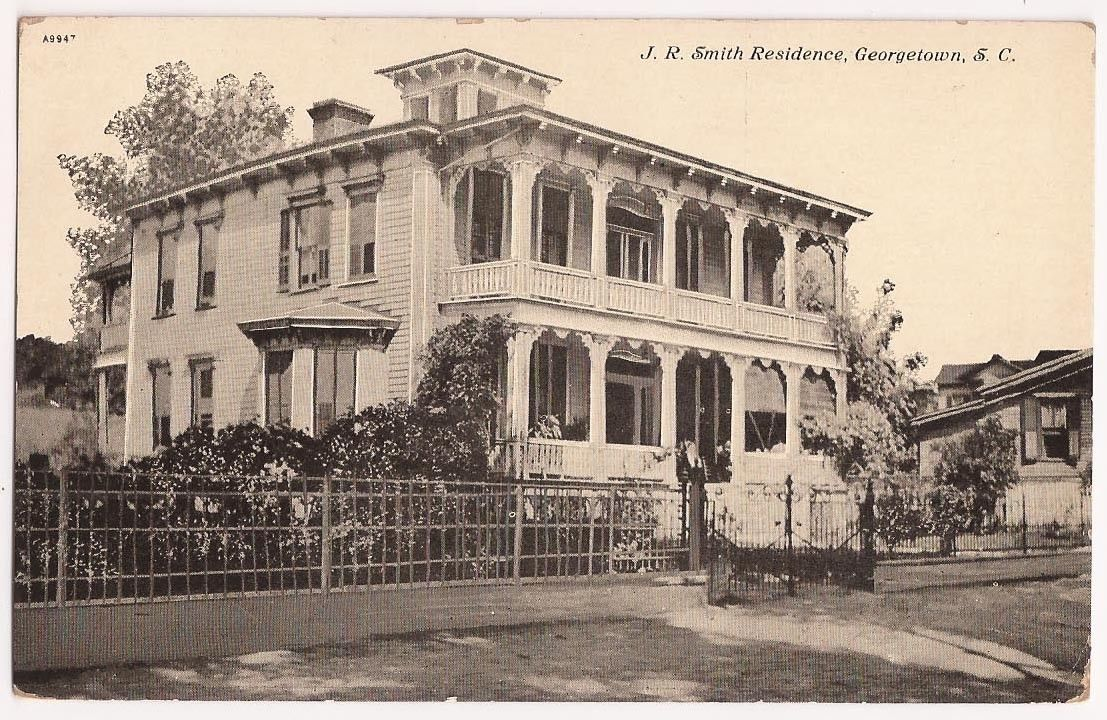
J.R. Smith House at 722 Prince Street. Also known as the Mark Moses house, it served briefly as a Jewish school.

In the antebellum years, the profits from Georgetown's rice trade also buoyed the economy of the nearby city and port of Charleston, where a thriving mercantile economy developed. With profits from rice, planters bought products from Charleston artisans: fine furniture, jewelry, and silver, to satisfy their refined tastes. Joshua John Ward was a planter who owned the most slaves in the US – eventually more than 1,000 slaves on several plantations; he lived in a townhouse in Georgetown.

Many of the historic plantation houses are still standing today, including Mansfield Plantation on the banks of the Black River. Joshua Ward's main Brookgreen Plantation is the center and namesake of the Brookgreen Gardens park. Since the late 20th century, historic societies and independent plantations have worked to present more of the entire plantation society, including the lives and skills of enslaved African Americans.

Georgetown's thriving economy long attracted settlers from elsewhere, including numerous planters and shipowners who migrated from Virginia. These included the Shackelford family, whose migrant ancestor John Shackelford moved to Georgetown in the late eighteenth century after serving in the Virginia forces of the Continental Army during the American Revolution. His descendants became prominent planters, lawyers, judges and businessmen in Georgetown and Charleston.

During the Civil War, the Confederate army built a fort and installed two camps near Georgetown at Murrells Inlet. Fort Ward was in service beginning in 1861, but it was abandoned and disarmed in March 1862. Its exact location is unknown due to shifting sandbars and erosion in the area. Confederate camps Lookout and Waccamaw were also located near Georgetown. Camp Waccamaw was in use from 1862 until 1864; Company E, 4th SC Cavalry was garrisoned at the camp. At least one soldier died there in 1862, probably from disease.

Additional fortifications were built at Battery White, located south of the town to protect the harbor and Winyah Bay. Construction during 1862–1863 on the cannon emplacement resulted in a well-built and situated set of fortifications which did not see action until 1864 when it was captured by Union forces.

=== Reconstruction and post-reconstruction period ===
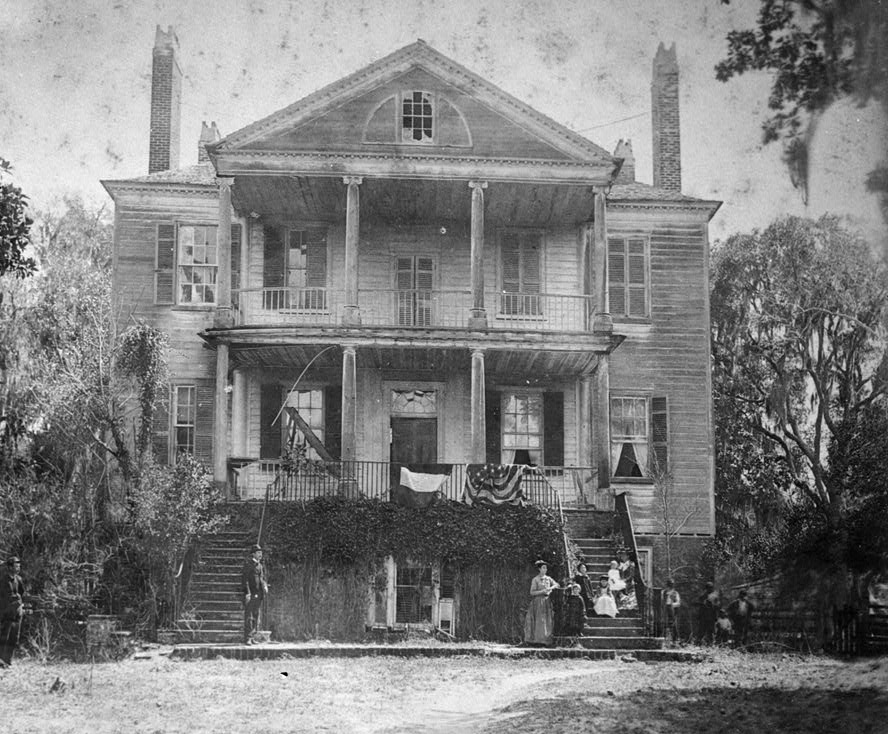
Arcadia Plantation, c. 1893, Georgetown vicinity, Georgetown County

Georgetown and Georgetown County suffered terribly during the Reconstruction Era because of its reliance on agriculture, for which the national market was low. The rice crops of 1866 to 1888 were failures due to lack of capital, which prevented adequate preparation for new crops; inclement weather; and the planters' struggle to find laborers.

Several African Americans from Georgetown represented Georgetown County in the state legislature during the Reconstruction Era, including Joseph Haynes Rainey, Bruce H. Williams, Charles H. Sperry, Charles Samuel Green, and James A. Bowley. A fusion arrangement was reached in 1880 and Republican African Americans and white Democrats appointed officials.

Some freedmen left the area in an effort to reunite families separated by the domestic slave trade. Many families withdrew women and children from working as field laborers. Many freedmen families wanted to work for themselves as subsistence farmers, rather than work in gangs for major plantation owners. Rice continued to be grown commercially until about 1910, but the market had changed. It was never as important economically or as profitable a crop as before 1860.

By the time the Reconstruction period ended, the area's economy was shifting to harvesting and processing wood products. By 1900 several lumber mills were operating on the Sampit River. The largest was the Atlantic Coast Lumber Company; its mill in Georgetown was the largest lumber mill on the East Coast at the time.

In 1900, a Georgetown constable's efforts to arrest barber John Brownfield for refusing to pay a poll tax resulted in a scuffle and his death in a shooting. White supremacists called for lynching and a tense period followed including appeals of Brownfield's murder conviction by an all-white jury with ties to the deceased and his family.

=== 20th century ===
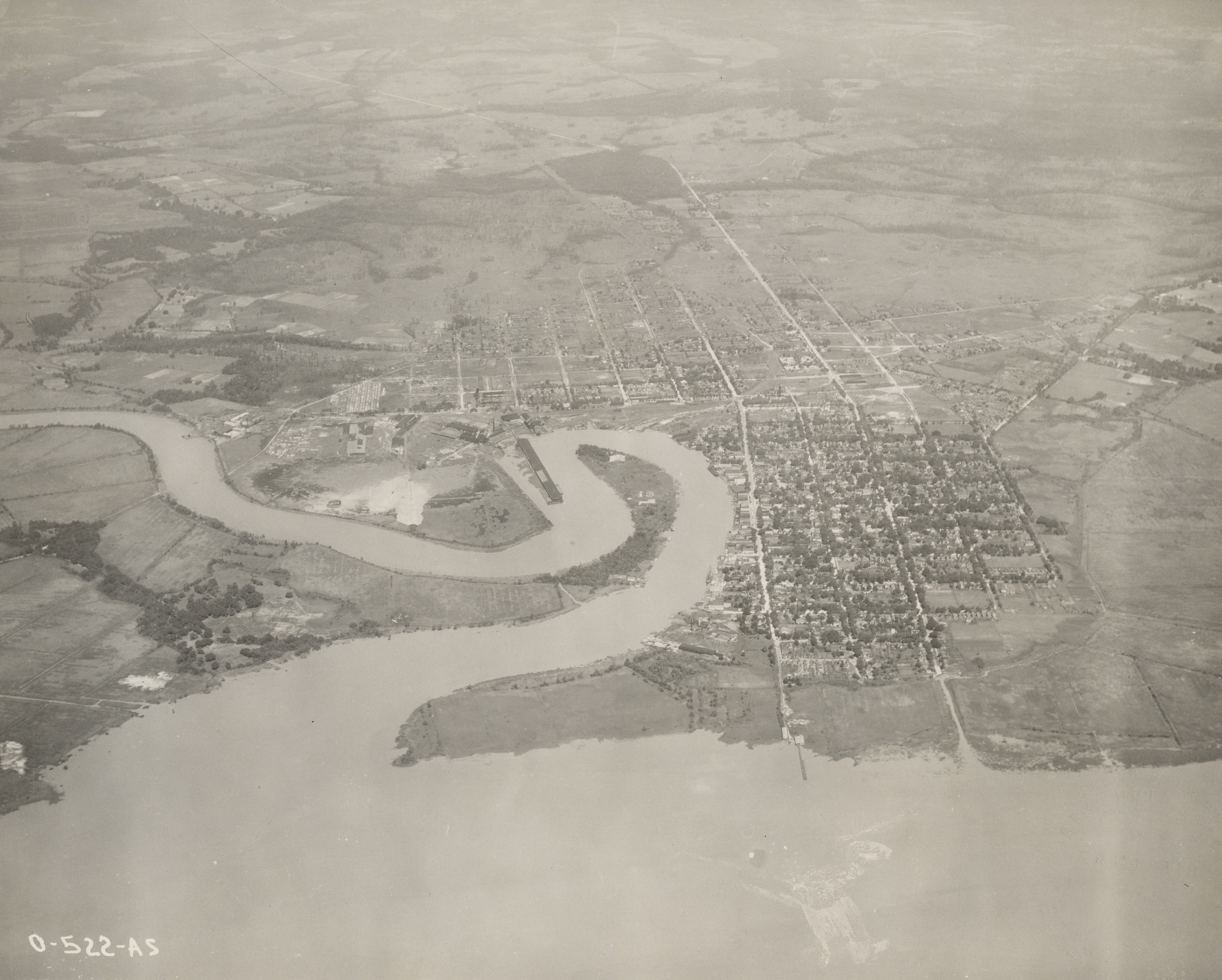
View of Georgetown in 1924

Around 1905, "Georgetown reached its peak as a lumber port", according to the historian Mac McAlister. Jim Crow laws excluded African Americans from taking part in elections and from holding office.

As the twentieth century dawned, Georgetown under the leadership of Mayor William Doyle Morgan began to modernize. The city added electricity, telephone service, sewer facilities, rail connections, some paved streets and sidewalks, new banks, a thriving port, and a new public school for white students. Public schools were segregated and black schools were historically underfunded. The US government built a handsome combination post office and customs house.

Like most cities, Georgetown suffered economic deprivation during the Great Depression. The Atlantic Coast Lumber Company went bankrupt early in the depression, putting almost everyone out of work. Businesses related to the mills also lost revenues and had to lay off employees, with a cascading effect through the city. In 1936 help arrived, when the Southern Kraft Division of International Paper opened a mill; by 1944 it was the largest in the world.

From the mid-20th century, the city developed more industry. In 1973, the Korf company of Germany founded a steel mill in town. in 1993, the steel mill was financed by Bain Capital and was called Georgetown Steel, which became GST Steel Company with its sister Kansas City Bolt and Nut Company plant in Kansas City, Missouri.

In 1978, Sigma Chemical Company founded its third chemical plant (the other 2 being in Italy) in Georgetown.

In September 1989, a major disaster struck the area with Hurricane Hugo struck south of Georgetown. Its extremely hard winds and an intense storm surge along the rivers flooded and damaged Georgetown and nearby areas. As Georgetown was under Hugo's northern eyewall, it suffered winds more severe and damaging than in Charleston, which was in the hurricane's weak corridor.

=== 2000 to present ===
In recent years, the economy has become more diversified. The GST Steel Company declared bankruptcy in 2001, first closing the Kansas City plant. In 2003 it closed the South Carolina plant. The Georgetown plant has subsequently reopened under ownership of ArcelorMittal. Due to the influx of cheap foreign steel into the United States, the plant closed its doors again in August 2015. On May 19, 2017, Mayor Jack Scoville announced that ArcelorMittal had agreed to sell the mill to Liberty Steel.

On September 25, 2013, a fire engulfed seven historic buildings on 700 Block of Front Street. The fire raged for hours while over 200 firefighters from ten departments and the United States Coast Guard fought to contain the blaze.

Heritage tourism has become a booming business in Georgetown, supporting much retail activity. In addition, many retirees have chosen to settle in this area of beaches, plantations redeveloped as residential communities, and humid subtropical climate. From 2016 to 2021, housing prices in Georgetown have risen 38 percent.

On January 18, 2018, long-time Democratic City Councilman Brendon Moses Barber, Sr. was inaugurated as Mayor of Georgetown; he is the first African-American mayor of the city. The City of Georgetown has always elected Democratic mayors, even as the make-up of the major parties has realigned since the late 20th century.

As of 2019, brackish water incursions into the Waccamaw River near Georgetown due to rising sea levels are increasing the risk of exposure to toxic vibrio bacteria.

In the 2021 municipal elections, Georgetown elected its first Republican-majority city council in its history. On January 3, 2022, city councilwoman Carol Jayroe was sworn in as the Mayor of Georgetown, having defeated incumbent Democratic mayor Brendon Barber. She is the first woman and the first Republican to hold the mayoralty in Georgetown’s history. "Post and Courier". January 4, 2022.

In September 2022, Hurricane Ian made landfall near Georgetown. On October 31, 2024, International Paper announced the closing of their Georgetown plant by the end of 2024, causing the loss of 526 hourly jobs and 148 salaried employees.

== Geography ==
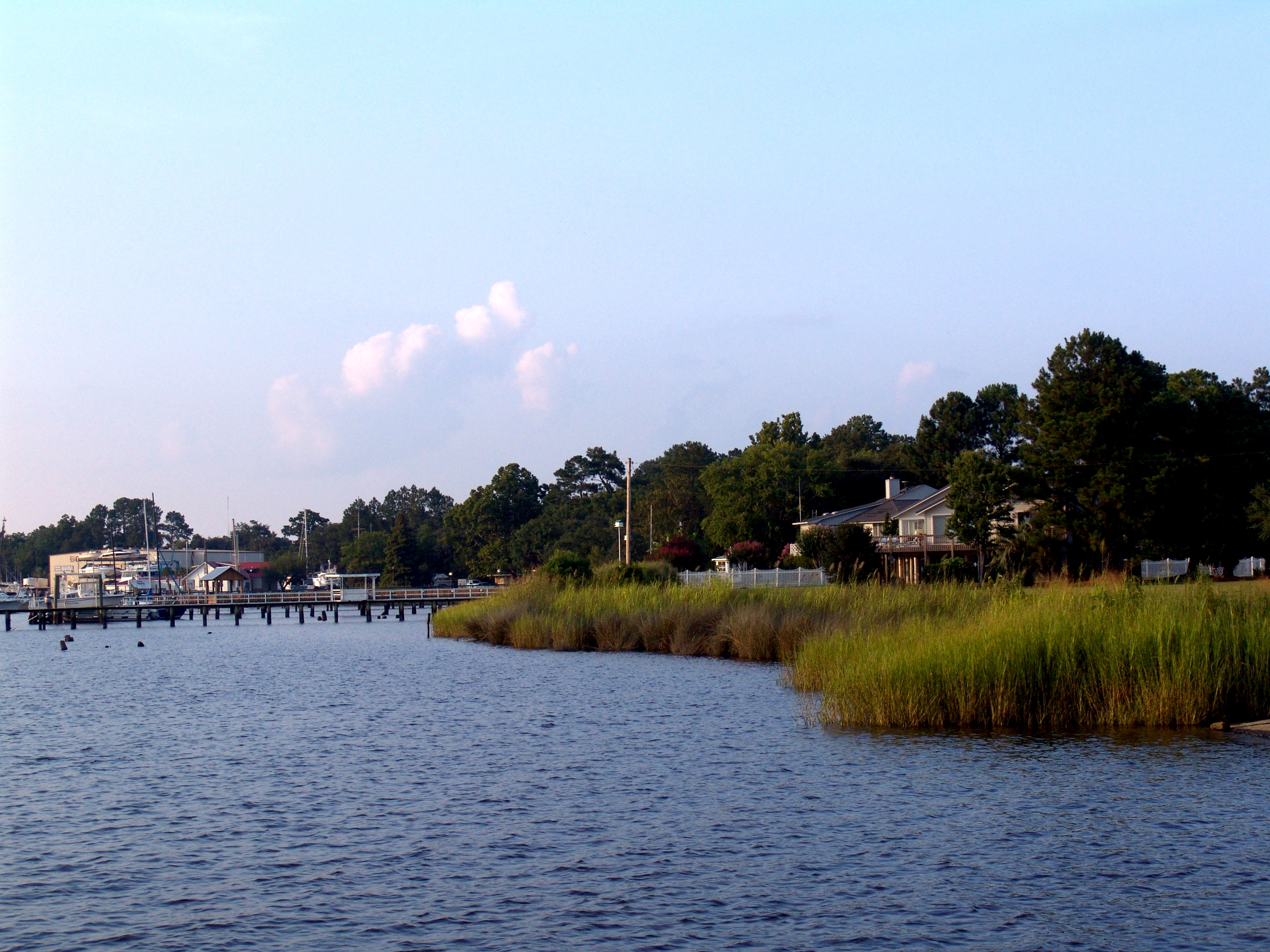
Looking at Georgetown from the point in East Bay Park

According to the United States Census Bureau, the city has a total area of 7.5 square miles (19.5 km^{2}), of which 6.9 square miles (17.9 km^{2}) are land and 0.62 square miles (1.6 km^{2}), or 8.06%, is water.

Winyah Bay formed from a submergent or drowned coastline. The original rivers had a lower baseline, but either the ocean rose or the land sank, flooding the river valleys and making a good location for a harbor.

U.S. Routes 17, 17A, 521, and 701 meet in the center of Georgetown. US 17 leads southwest 60 miles (97 km) to Charleston and northeast 34 miles (55 km) to Myrtle Beach, US 701 leads north 36 miles (58 km) to Conway, US 521 leads northwest 82 miles (132 km) to Sumter, and US 17A leads west 32 miles (51 km) to Jamestown.

=== Climate ===
Climate data for Georgetown, South Carolina (Georgetown County Airport) (1991–2020 normals)
Month	Jan	Feb	Mar	Apr	May	Jun	Jul	Aug	Sep	Oct	Nov	Dec	Year
Mean daily maximum °F (°C)	58.6 (14.8)	61.5 (16.4)	67.5 (19.7)	76.2 (24.6)	82.4 (28.0)	88.0 (31.1)	91.1 (32.8)	90.0 (32.2)	85.7 (29.8)	77.6 (25.3)	68.1 (20.1)	60.4 (15.8)	75.6 (24.2)
Daily mean °F (°C)	47.8 (8.8)	50.2 (10.1)	55.8 (13.2)	64.4 (18.0)	71.8 (22.1)	78.3 (25.7)	81.8 (27.7)	81.1 (27.3)	76.4 (24.7)	66.6 (19.2)	56.5 (13.6)	50.1 (10.1)	65.1 (18.4)
Mean daily minimum °F (°C)	37.0 (2.8)	38.8 (3.8)	44.0 (6.7)	52.7 (11.5)	61.1 (16.2)	68.7 (20.4)	72.5 (22.5)	72.1 (22.3)	67.2 (19.6)	55.7 (13.2)	44.8 (7.1)	39.8 (4.3)	54.5 (12.5)
Average precipitation inches (mm)	3.55 (90)	3.55 (90)	3.62 (92)	3.35 (85)	3.37 (86)	5.43 (138)	7.09 (180)	6.94 (176)	6.49 (165)	5.00 (127)	3.11 (79)	3.93 (100)	55.43 (1,408)
Source: NOAA

== Demographics ==
Historical population
Census	Pop.	Note	%±
1850	1,628		—
1860	1,720		5.7%
1870	2,080		20.9%
1880	2,557		22.9%
1890	2,895		13.2%
1900	4,138		42.9%
1910	5,530		33.6%
1920	4,579		−17.2%
1930	5,082		11.0%
1940	5,559		9.4%
1950	6,004		8.0%
1960	12,261		104.2%
1970	10,449		−14.8%
1980	10,144		−2.9%
1990	9,517		−6.2%
2000	8,950		−6.0%
2010	9,163		2.4%
2020	8,403		−8.3%
U.S. Decennial Census

=== 2020 census ===
As of the 2020 census, Georgetown had a population of 8,403. The median age was 42.9 years, with 23.1% of residents under the age of 18 and 22.4% who were 65 years of age or older; for every 100 females there were 83.0 males, and for every 100 females age 18 and over there were 78.1 males.

Racial composition as of the 2020 census
Race	Number	Percent
White	3,444	41.0%
Black or African American	4,376	52.1%
American Indian and Alaska Native	12	0.1%
Asian	59	0.7%
Native Hawaiian and Other Pacific Islander	8	0.1%
Some other race	230	2.7%
Two or more races	274	3.3%
Hispanic or Latino (of any race)	409	4.9%

Of residents, 99.5% lived in urban areas, while 0.5% lived in rural areas.

There were 3,451 households in Georgetown, of which 30.7% had children under the age of 18 living in them. Of all households, 30.3% were married-couple households, 19.4% were households with a male householder and no spouse or partner present, and 44.4% were households with a female householder and no spouse or partner present. About 33.5% of all households were made up of individuals and 16.2% had someone living alone who was 65 years of age or older.

There were 4,138 housing units, of which 16.6% were vacant. The homeowner vacancy rate was 2.4% and the rental vacancy rate was 7.7%.

=== 2010 census ===
As of the 2010 census, there were 9,163 people in Georgetown, an increase of 2.4 percent over the 2000 population of 8,950.

=== 2000 census ===
The 2000 census recorded 8,950 people, 3,411 households, and 2,305 families residing in the city. The population density was 1,368.1 inhabitants per square mile (528.2/km^{2}). There were 3,856 housing units at an average density of 589.4 per square mile (227.6/km^{2}). The racial makeup of the city was 57.03% African American (56.7 percent in 2010), 40.99% White (37.8 percent in 2010), 0.12% Native American, 0.31% Asian, 0.04% Pacific Islander, 0.84% from other races, and 0.66% from two or more races. Hispanic or Latino of any race were 1.88% of the population.

There were 3,411 households, out of which 32.8% had children under the age of 18 living with them, 38.0% were married couples living together, 25.1% had a female householder with no husband present, and 32.4% were non-families. Of all households 28.9% were made up of individuals, and 12.9% had someone living alone who was 65 years of age or older. The average household size was 2.55 and the average family size was 3.14.

In the city, the population was spread out, with 28.6% under the age of 18, 8.8% from 18 to 24, 25.2% from 25 to 44, 21.0% from 45 to 64, and 16.4% who were 65 years of age or older. The median age was 35 years. For every 100 females, there were 81.9 males. For every 100 females age 18 and over, there were 75.1 males.

The median income for a household in the city was $29,424, and the median income for a family was $34,747. Males had a median income of $27,545 versus $19,000 for females. The per capita income for the city was $14,568. About 19.9% of families and 24.1% of the population were below the poverty line, including 34.9% of those under age 18 and 16.9% of those age 65 or over.

== Registered historic sites ==
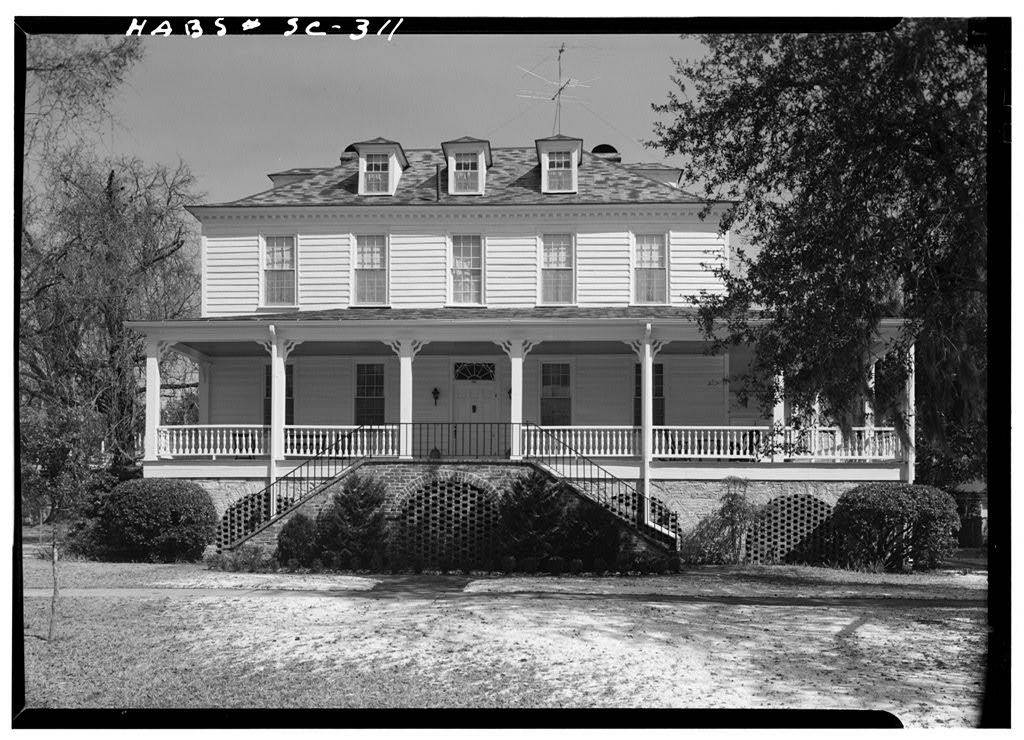
John S. Pyatt House

Today, the Georgetown Historic District contains more than fifty homes, public buildings, and sites listed on the National Register of Historic Places. Other sites on the National Register include Annandale Plantation, Arcadia Plantation, Battery White, Belle Isle Rice Mill Chimney, Beneventum Plantation House, Black River Plantation House, Brookgreen Gardens, Chicora Wood Plantation, Fairfield Rice Mill Chimney, Friendfield Plantation, Georgetown Light, Hobcaw Barony, Hopsewee, Keithfield Plantation, Mansfield Plantation, Milldam Rice Mill and Rice Barn, Minim Island Shell Midden (38GE46), Nightingale Hall Rice Mill Chimney, Old Market Building, Pee Dee River Rice Planters Historic District, Prince George Winyah Episcopal Church, Joseph H. Rainey House, Rural Hall Plantation House, Weehaw Rice Mill Chimney, Wicklow Hall Plantation, and Winyah Indigo School.

== Education ==
Georgetown High School is in Georgetown. Georgetown has a public library, a branch of the Georgetown County Library.

== Notable people ==
- Mary Fleming Black (1848–1893), author and religious worker
- Anna Peyre Dinnies (1807–1886), poet, miscellaneous writer
- Clayton Geathers, University Of Central Florida football, NFL football player
- Clifton Geathers, NFL football player various NFL teams
- Jumpy Geathers, football player for various teams. He was a two-time Super Bowl champion.
- Kwame Geathers, University of Georgia football, NFL football player
- Melissa Jefferson, sprinter and 2024 Summer Olympics gold and bronze medalist
- Dasean Jones (born 1978), United States district judge
- Ruston Kelly, singer-songwriter
- Anthuan Maybank (born 1969), sprinter and 1996 Summer Olympics gold medalist
- Joseph Rainey (1832–1887), politician and first African-American member of the U.S. House of Representatives
- Tyrell Richard, US track runner and medalist, younger brother of Donovan Richard
