= Keithfield Plantation =

Historic property in Georgetown County, South Carolina

- U.S. National Register of Historic Places
- U.S. Historic district
- Location within South Carolina Location within the United States
- Location: Off County Road 52, near Georgetown, South Carolina
- Coordinates: 33°26′21″N 79°14′39″W
- Area: 264.8 acres (107.2 ha)
- Built: 1866
- Architectural style: Single pen slave cabin
- MPS: Georgetown County Rice Culture MPS
- NRHP reference No.: 88000529
- Added to NRHP: October 3, 1988

Keithfield Plantation is a historic rice plantation property and national historic district located near Georgetown, Georgetown County, South Carolina. The district encompasses 1 contributing building, 1 contributing site, and 3 contributing structures. They include a slave cabin, built about 1830, and agricultural features including examples of historic ricefields, canals, dikes, and trunks. The original main house burned in the mid-20th century. Keithfield was one of several productive rice plantations on the Black River.

It was listed on the National Register of Historic Places in 1988.
