= Charles Sperry =

Charles Sperry may refer to:

- Charles Stillman Sperry (1847–1911), United States Navy admiral
  - USS Charles S. Sperry, an Allen M. Sumner-class destroyer
- Charles H. Sperry, teacher, state legislator, and carpenter in South Carolina

== See also ==
- Chuck Sperry (born 1962), American artist
