= Charles Samuel Green =

American politician

Charles Samuel Green was a farmer and state legislator in South Carolina. He represented Georgetown County, South Carolina, and was first elected as a representative in October 1872.

Green was born enslaved in Georgetown County. He served in the South Carolina House of Representatives from 1872 to 1878.

In December 1876 he was appointed to the Committee on Military Affairs and the Committee on Contingent Accounts and Expenses.

== See also ==
- African American officeholders from the end of the Civil War until before 1900

== Notes ==
Not to be confused with Samuel Green who served in the South Carolina House of Representatives for some of the same time.
