= Fairfield Rice Mill Chimney =

- U.S. National Register of Historic Places
- Location within South Carolina Location within the United States
- Location: Off U.S. Route 17, near Georgetown, South Carolina
- Coordinates: 33°23′33″N 79°13′11″W
- Area: less than one acre
- MPS: Georgetown County Rice Culture MPS
- NRHP reference No.: 88000527
- Added to NRHP: October 3, 1988

Fairfield Rice Mill Chimney is a historic rice mill chimney located near Georgetown, Georgetown County, South Carolina. It is one of seven known extant rice mill chimneys in Georgetown County. It was associated with Fairfield, one of several productive plantations on the Waccamaw River.

== Overview ==
The chimney is octagonal shaped and approximately 35 feet high. In the 1930s the Fairfield rice mill, with its steam engine, boiler, and other machinery, was taken to Dearborn, Michigan, reassembled, refurbished, and put back into operation as a museum exhibit in Henry Ford’s Greenfield Village.

It was listed on the National Register of Historic Places in 1988.

== See also ==
- Weehaw Rice Mill Chimney
