= Bruce H. Williams =

American politician (died 1916)

Bruce H. Williams (died 1916) was a state legislator in South Carolina.

He was born in Waccamaw Neck in Georgetown, South Carolina and was a slave owned by Dr. J. D. McGill. After the American Civil War he went to high school in Raleigh, North Carolina and became an A. M. E. Minister in 1867.

During the Reconstruction era he served as a clerk of the court, election commissioner, and school trustee in Marion County, South Carolina. He served in the South Carolina House representing Georgetown County from 1874 to 1876 and then in the South Carolina Senate from 1876 to 1887. He was a Republican. He died in Charleston, South Carolina.
