= Georgetown Lighthouse =

Georgetown Lighthouse may refer to:

- Georgetown Light
- Georgetown Lighthouse, Guyana
