= Belle Isle Rice Mill Chimney =

- U.S. National Register of Historic Places
- U.S. Historic district
- Location within South Carolina Location within the United States
- Location: Cat Island, near Georgetown, South Carolina
- Coordinates: 33°12′02″N 79°15′30″W
- Area: 76 acres (31 ha)
- MPS: Georgetown County Rice Culture MPS
- NRHP reference No.: 88000525
- Added to NRHP: October 3, 1988

Belle Isle Rice Mill Chimney is a historic rice mill chimney and national historic district located near Georgetown, Georgetown County, South Carolina. The district encompasses one contributing site and four contributing structures. This rice mill chimney is one of seven known extant rice mill chimneys in Georgetown County and is associated with what once was one of several productive rice plantations on Cat Island. It is one of two extant rice mill chimneys in Georgetown County and measures 33 feet, 9 inches, high.

It was listed on the National Register of Historic Places in 1988.
