= Black River Plantation House =

Historic house in South Carolina, United States

- U.S. National Register of Historic Places
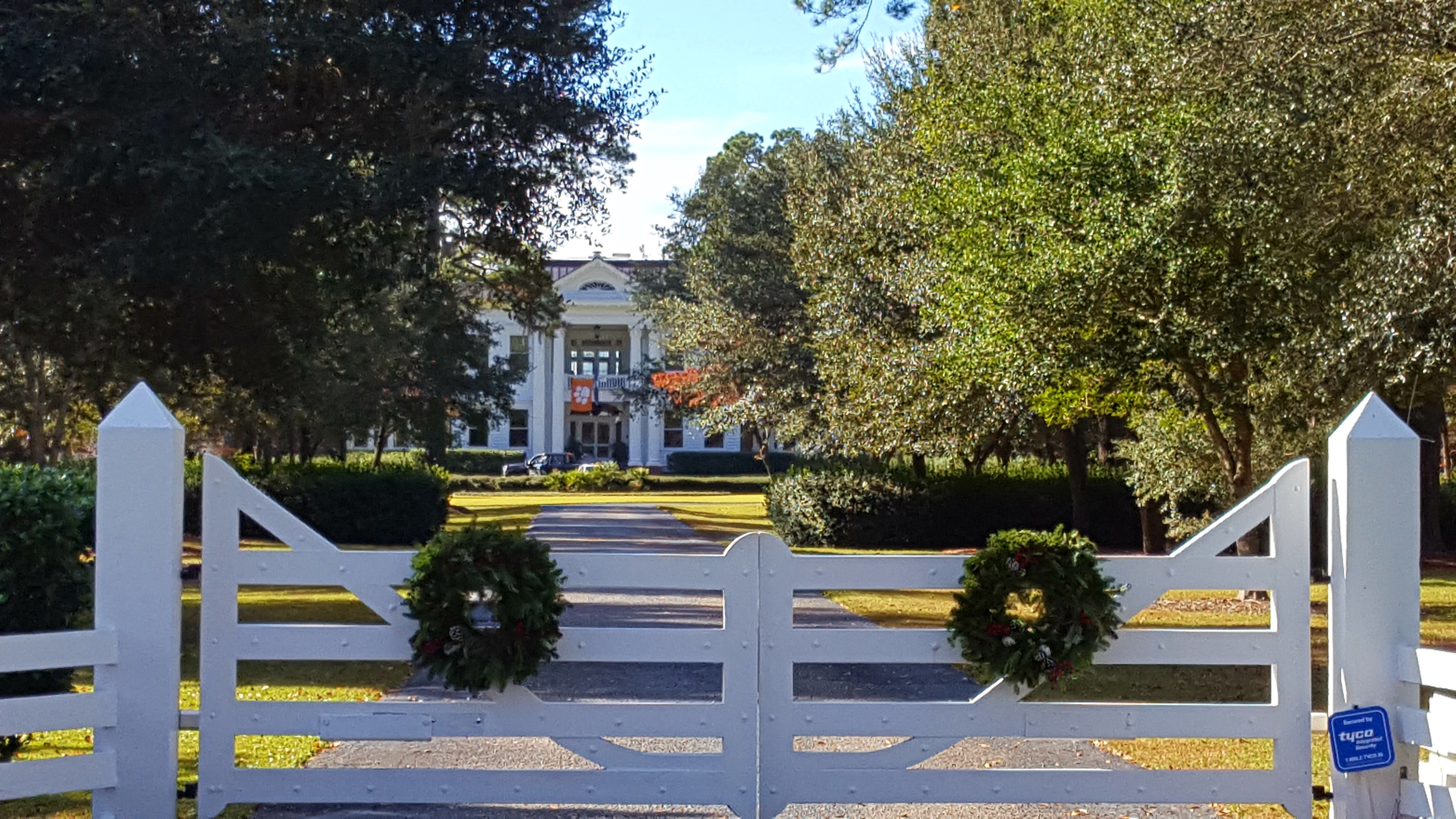

- Location within South Carolina Location within the United States
- Location: Southwestern side of South Carolina Highway 51, 0.5 miles northwest of Peters Creek, near Georgetown, South Carolina
- Coordinates: 33°30′37″N 79°18′01″W
- Area: 11 acres (4.5 ha)
- Built: 1919
- Built by: Waddell, Charles L. Waddell
- Architectural style: Classical Revival
- NRHP reference No.: 94000062
- Added to NRHP: March 2, 1994

Black River Plantation House, also known as Rice Hope Plantation, Black River; and International Paper Company House, is a historic home located near Georgetown in Georgetown County, South Carolina. It was built in 1919, and is a 2 1/2-story, Neo-Classical Revival frame house. It is clad in weatherboard and has a hipped roof. The riverside façade features a portico supported by four columns with Corinthian order capitals. The house was purchased by the International Paper Company in 1942, and used by company employees and guests as a resort.

It was listed on the National Register of Historic Places in 1994.
