= Dunbar, Georgetown County, South Carolina =

Dunbar, South Carolina
- Census-designated place
- Interactive map of Dunbar, South Carolina
- Coordinates: 33°32′03″N 79°21′12″W
- Country: United States
- State: South Carolina
- County: Georgetown
- Elevation: 13 ft (4.0 m)

Population (2020)
  - Total: 615
- Time zone: UTC-5 (Eastern (EST))
  - Summer (DST): UTC-4 (EDT)
- Area codes: 843, 854
- GNIS feature ID: 2812956

Dunbar is an unincorporated community and census-designated place (CDP) in Georgetown County, South Carolina, United States. It was first listed as a CDP in the 2020 census with a population of 615.

== Demographics ==
Historical population
Census	Pop.	Note	%±
2020	615		—
U.S. Decennial Census; 2020

Dunbar first appeared as a census designated place in the 2020 U.S. census.

=== 2020 census ===
Dunbar CDP, South Carolina – Racial and Ethnic Composition (NH = Non-Hispanic) Note: the US Census treats Hispanic/Latino as an ethnic category. This table excludes Latinos from the racial categories and assigns them to a separate category. Hispanics/Latinos may be of any race.
Race / Ethnicity	Pop 2020	% 2020
White alone (NH)	8	1.30%
Black or African American alone (NH)	593	96.42%
Native American or Alaska Native alone (NH)	0	0.00%
Asian alone (NH)	0	0.00%
Pacific Islander alone (NH)	0	0.00%
Some Other Race alone (NH)	1	0.16%
Mixed Race/Multi-Racial (NH)	9	1.46%
Hispanic or Latino (any race)	4	0.65%
Total	615	100.00%
