= Rural Hall Plantation House =

Historic house in South Carolina, United States

- U.S. National Register of Historic Places
- Location within South Carolina Location within the United States
- Location: Off County Road 179, near Georgetown, South Carolina
- Coordinates: 33°30′46″N 79°20′40″W
- Area: less than one acre
- MPS: Georgetown County Rice Culture MPS
- NRHP reference No.: 88000533
- Added to NRHP: October 3, 1988

Rural Hall Plantation House is a historic plantation house located near Georgetown, Georgetown County, South Carolina. It was built about 1850, and is a two-story, five-bay, frame dwelling. It features a porch across the main façade facing the river, and an identical porch on the opposite (land) side, which is visible from the road.

It was listed on the National Register of Historic Places in 1988.
