= Pee Dee River Rice Planters Historic District =

Historic district in South Carolina, United States

- U.S. National Register of Historic Places
- U.S. Historic district
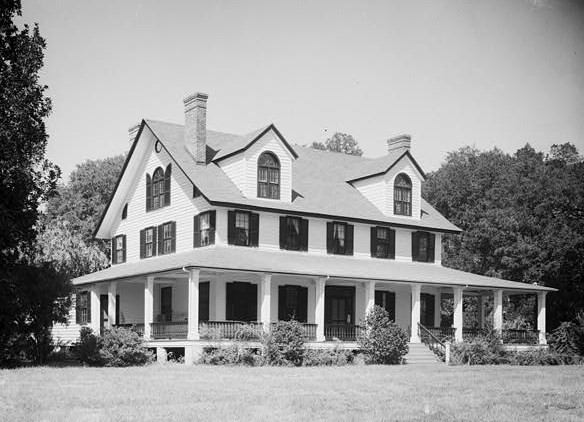
- Dirleton Plantation, HABS Photo, October 1977

- Location within South Carolina Location within the United States
- Location: Along the Pee Dee and Waccamaw Rivers, near Georgetown, South Carolina; also 1 Ave. of Live Oaks
- Coordinates: 33°12′09″N 79°19′58″W
- Area: 5,100 acres (2,100 ha)
- Architectural style: Gothic
- MPS: Georgetown County Rice Culture MPS
- NRHP reference No.: 88000532 (original); 100005674 (increase)

Significant dates
- Added to NRHP: October 3, 1988
- Boundary increase: October 16, 2020

Pee Dee River Rice Planters Historic District is a set of historic rice plantation properties and national historic district located near Georgetown, Georgetown County, South Carolina.

== Historic features ==
The district encompasses 10 contributing building, 16 contributing sites, and 34 contributing structures.

=== Pee Dee River plantations ===
It includes extant buildings, structures, and ricefields associated with 12 rice plantations located along the Pee Dee River.
They include:

- Hasty Point,
- Breakwater,
- Belle Rive,
- Exchange,
- Rosebank,
- Chicora Wood Plantation,
- Guendalos,
- Enfield,
- Birdfield,
- Arundel Plantation,
- Springfield,
- Dirleton

=== Waccamaw River plantations ===
It also includes five rice plantations located along the Waccamaw River:

- Turkey Hill,
- Oatland,
- Willbrook,
- Litchfield,
- Waverly

=== Rice planters culture ===
These plantations were part of a large rice culture in the county which flourished from about 1750 to about 1910.

This district includes:

- Four plantation houses (at Exchange, Rosebank, Chicora Wood, and Dirleton);
- Two rice barns (at Hasty Point and Exchange);
- Collections of plantation outbuildings (at Chicora Wood and Arundel);
- Rice mill and chimney (at Chicora Wood);
- Historic ricefields with canals, dikes, and trunks.

The plantation houses are all frame houses with a central hall plan.

The Pee Dee River Rice Planters Historic District was listed on the National Register of Historic Places in 1988.

== See also ==
- National Register of Historic Places listings in Georgetown County, South Carolina
