= Nightingale Hall Rice Mill Chimney =

- U.S. National Register of Historic Places
- Location within South Carolina Location within the United States
- Location: Off County Road 52, near Georgetown, South Carolina
- Coordinates: 33°26′46″N 79°12′46″W
- Area: less than one acre
- Built: 1846
- MPS: Georgetown County Rice Culture MPS
- NRHP reference No.: 88000531
- Added to NRHP: October 3, 1988

Nightingale Hall Rice Mill Chimney, also known as Nightingale Plantation, is a historic rice mill chimney located near Georgetown, Georgetown County, South Carolina. This rice mill chimney is significant as one of seven known extant rice mill chimneys in Georgetown County. It is associated with Nightingale Hall, one of several productive plantations on the Pee Dee River. The chimney is approximately 29 feet high, and 6 feet square at the base.

It was listed on the National Register of Historic Places in 1988.
