= Winyah Indigo School =

Former high school in South Carolina, US

- Winyah High School
- U.S. National Register of Historic Places
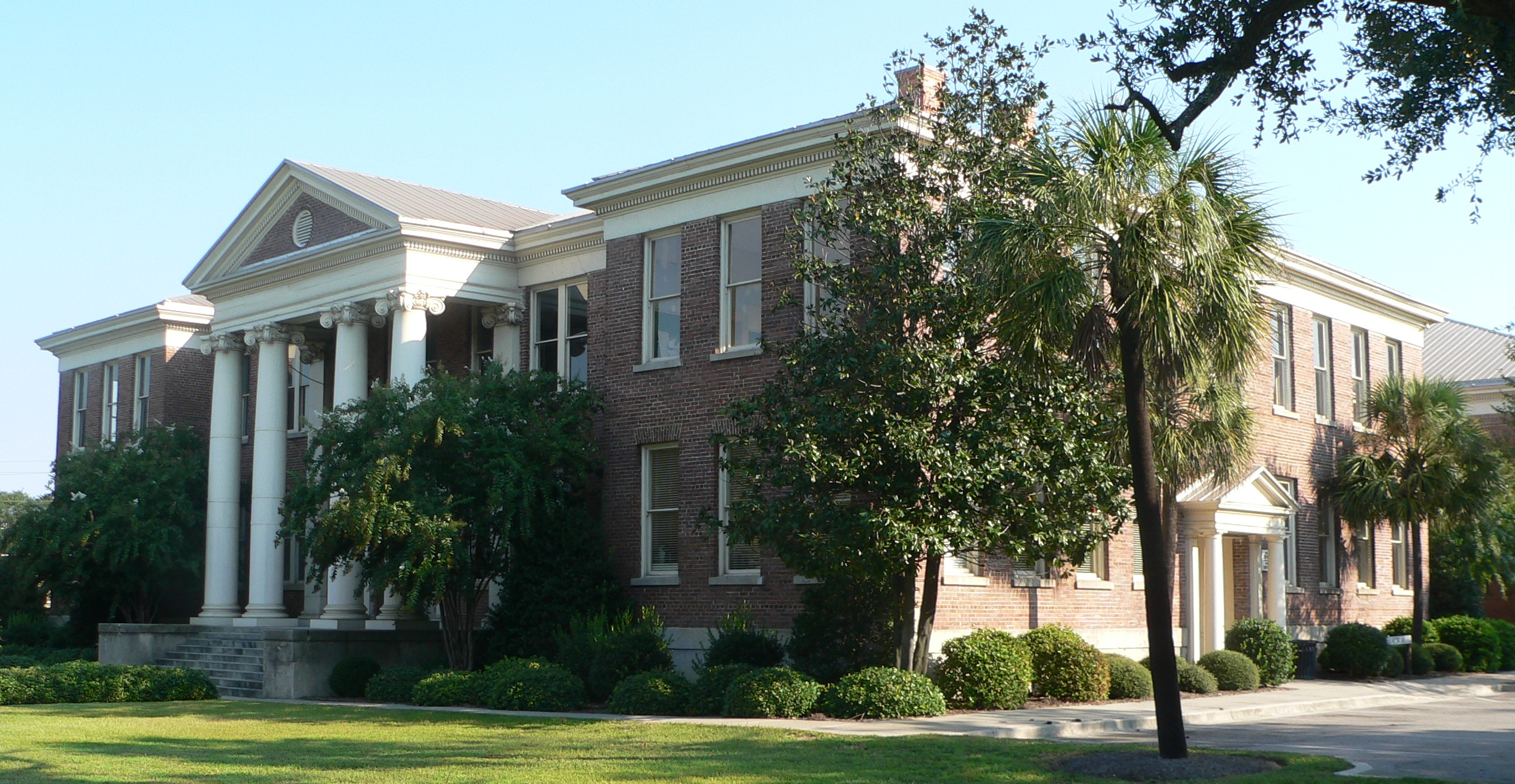
- Winyah High School, September 2011

- Location within South Carolina Location within the United States
- Location: 1200 Highmarket St., Georgetown, South Carolina
- Coordinates: 33°22′22″N 79°17′11″W
- Area: 1.3 acres (0.53 ha)
- Built: 1908 (118 years ago)
- Architect: Wilson, Sompayrac & Urquhart; Et al.
- Architectural style: Classical Revival
- NRHP reference No.: 88002386
- Added to NRHP: November 3, 1988

Winyah School, also known as Winyah Graded and High School, Georgetown Graded & High School, and Old Winyah School, is a historic school building located at Georgetown, Georgetown County, South Carolina. It consists of a 1908 Classical Revival style school building and auditorium, with an auditorium extension and high school addition built about 1924. It has a raised masonry and concrete foundation and low hipped roof.

It was listed on the National Register of Historic Places in 1988.

Winyah High School served white students while Howard High School served African American students. An arson attack damaged it on November 5th, 1981. Integrated Georgetown High School replaced it and Howard High School 4 years later.
