= Anna Peyre Dinnies =

American writer

- Born: Anna Peyre Shackleford; February 7, 1805; Georgetown, South Carolina, U.S.
- Died: August 8, 1886 (aged 81); New Orleans, Louisiana, U.S.
- Occupations: poet; miscellaneous writer
- Spouse: John C. Dinnies (m. 1830; died 1882)
- Children: 2 daughters
- Writing career
- Pen name: Moina
- Language: English
- Period: Romantic era

Anna Peyre Dinnies (née Shackleford; pen name Moina; February 7, 1805 – August 8, 1886) was an American poet and miscellaneous writer of the Romantic era. Under the pen name of "Moina", both before and after her marriage, she wrote many poems which attracted attention, of which "Chrysanthemum" was one of the better-known. She contributed to the leading periodicals of the Southern United States.

== Early life and education ==
Anna (or "Anne") Peyre Shackleford was born in Georgetown, South Carolina, February 7, 1805. She was one of the several daughters of Judge W. F. Shackleford.

The family moved to Charleston, South Carolina when Anna was a child. She was educated in that city in a seminary kept by the daughters of Dr. David Ramsay, the author and historian.

== Career ==
Shackleford corresponded for four years with John C. Dinnies, a bookseller in St. Louis, Missouri. Once they met after those four years of writing letters to eachother they were married one week later. This marriage happened in 1830. John C. Dinnies and a man named Radford were the publishers of The St. Louis Medical and Surgical Journal, a monthly.

The Floral Year, Embellished with Bouquets of Flowers, Drawn and Colored from Nature. Each Flower illustrated with a Poem

In 1845, or 1849, Mr. and Mrs. Dinnies removed from St. Louis for New Orleans. In 1847, Anna Dinnies published The Floral Year, Embellished with Bouquets of Flowers, Drawn and Colored from Nature. Each Flower illustrated with a Poem. By Mrs. Anna Peyre Dinnies. Boston: Benjamin B. Mussy, Publisher, 1847. The book contains 256 pages, illustrated by 13 full-page colored plates.

Dinnies only child, a daughter, died in 1853. A few years later, she and her husband adopted a little girl. Theircadopted daughter llater married Louis Grunewald of New Orleans.

In New Orleans, John Clifford Dinnies worked as a journalist. He wrote special articles for some of the daily newspapers, and for several years edited The Price Current. On account of an editorial, General Benjamin Butler suspended The Price Current during the civil war and had John C. Dinnies imprisoned.

Anna Dinnies published many poems in various magazines under the pen-name of Moina. Among her better poems are "The Wife", "Wedded Love", "Love's Messenger", "Carolina", a patriotic war-lyric, and "The Greek Skave", an imaginative interpretation of Powers' famous statue. As to the controversy over the authorship of "The Conquered Banner", Dinnies, in the 1830s, adopted the pen name of Moina, using it for contributions to The Illinois Monthly Magazine. In the 1860s, Father Abram J. Ryan used the same pseudonym, unaware of Anna Dinnies' claim to it. "The Conquered Banner" was published under the signature Moina. The correspondence that took place between Dinnies and Ryan was as to the use of the name Moina — not as to the authorship of "The Conquered Banner". Dinnies never claimed the poem, and Ryan graciously apologized and neverused the signature Moina again.

== Death ==
John C. Dinnies died in 1882. Anna Dinnies died in New Orleans, Louisiana on August 8, 1886.

== Selected works ==
=== Books ===
- The Floral Year, Embellished with Bouquets of Flowers, Drawn and Colored from Nature. Each Flower illustrated with a Poem. By Mrs. Anna Peyre Dinnies. Boston: Benjamin B. Mussy, Publisher, 1847.

=== Poems ===
- "The Wife"
- "Wedded Love"
- "Love's Messenger"
- "Carolina"
- "The Greek Skave"
- "The Conquered Banner"
