= Milldam Rice Mill and Rice Barn =

Historic site in South Carolina, U.S.

- U.S. National Register of Historic Places
- U.S. Historic district
- Location within South Carolina Location within the United States
- Location: Off County Road 30, near Georgetown, South Carolina
- Coordinates: 33°12′09″N 79°19′58″W
- Area: 882 acres (357 ha)
- MPS: Georgetown County Rice Culture MPS
- NRHP reference No.: 88000530
- Added to NRHP: October 3, 1988

Milldam Rice Mill and Rice Barn, also known as Kinloch Plantation, is a historic rice plantation property and national historic district located near Georgetown, Georgetown County, South Carolina. The district encompasses one contributing building, one contributing site, and three contributing structures. This rice mill and rice barn are associated with Milldam, one of several productive rice plantations on the Santee River. Agricultural features include examples of historic ricefields, including canals, dikes (including remnants of a dike hand-built by slaves) and trunks. The Rice Barn was destroyed by Hurricane Hugo in 1989.

It was listed on the National Register of Historic Places in 1988.
