= Weehaw Rice Mill Chimney =

- U.S. National Register of Historic Places
- Location within South Carolina Location within the United States
- Location: Off County Road 325, near Georgetown, South Carolina
- Coordinates: 33°24′18″N 79°16′4″W
- Area: less than one acre
- MPS: Georgetown County Rice Culture MPS
- NRHP reference No.: 88000534
- Added to NRHP: October 3, 1988

Weehaw Rice Mill Chimney is a historic rice mill chimney located near Georgetown, Georgetown County, South Carolina. This rice mill chimney is significant as one of seven known extant rice mill chimneys in Georgetown County. It is associated with Weehaw, on the Black River, which was one of the earliest successful rice plantations in the area. The chimney is approximately 35 feet high.

It was listed on the National Register of Historic Places in 1988.
