= Minim Island Shell Midden (38GE46) =

Archaeological site in South Carolina, United States

- U.S. National Register of Historic Places
- Nearest city: Georgetown, South Carolina
- Area: less than one acre
- NRHP reference No.: 82003852
- Added to NRHP: August 18, 1982

Minim Island Shell Midden (38GE46) is a historic midden and archaeological site located near Georgetown, Georgetown County, South Carolina. The site consists of prehistoric midden deposits of shellfish remains, floral and faunal remains, and interred human burials. Cultural materials in the form of ceramics and lithics occur throughout the midden. These deposits are concentrated for a distance of about 100 feet along the shoreline of the Intracoastal Waterway.

This shell midden was listed on the National Register of Historic Places in 1982.
