= DaSean Jones =

American judge (born 1978)

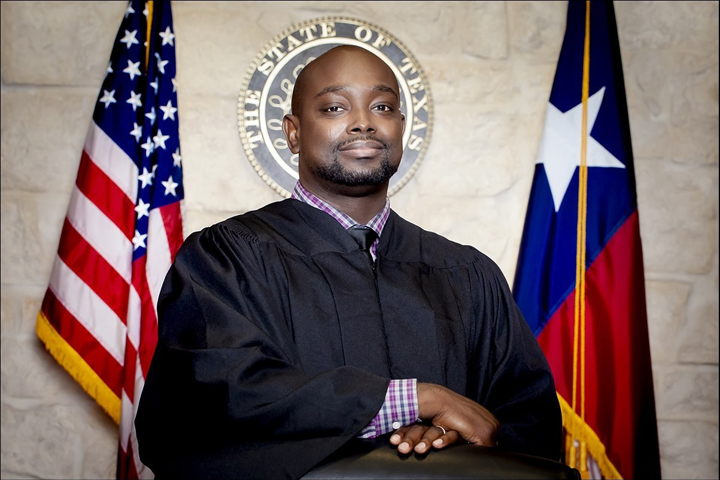

Judge of the Texas 180th District Court
- Incumbent
- Assumed office August 5, 2019

Personal details
- Born: August 12, 1978 (age 47) Georgetown, South Carolina, U.S.
- Party: Democratic
- Education: Tuskegee University (BA); Webster University (MA); Texas Southern University (JD)

Military service
- Allegiance: United States
- Branch/service: United States Army
- Years of service: 2001–present
- Rank: Lieutenant Colonel
- Awards: See list: Bronze Star Meritorious Service Medal Army Commendation Medal Army Achievement Medal National Defense Service Medal

DaSean Jones (born August 12, 1978) is a Texas District Court Judge in Harris County, Texas. As a member of the Democratic Party, he has been the judge of the Texas 180th District Court since 2019.

Jones is running for the 2024 Texas Supreme Court Place 2 election against incumbent Jimmy Blacklock.

== Early life and education ==
Jones was born and raised in Georgetown, South Carolina. From an early age, Jones was influenced by his father, a U.S. Army veteran. Jones began his higher education at Tuskegee University in Tuskegee, Alabama, where he earned a Bachelor of Arts in English, graduating in May 2001. Following his undergraduate studies, Jones furthered his education at Webster University in St. Louis, Missouri, where he obtained a Master of Arts in Management and Leadership, graduating in March 2006.

Jones then attended Texas Southern University’s Thurgood Marshall School of Law in Houston, Texas, where he earned his Juris Doctor degree, graduating in May 2011. During law school, he was involved in extracurricular activities, including participating in the Navy JAG National Moot Court Competition. He also served as President of the Phi Alpha Delta Law Fraternity.

== Career ==
=== Military Service ===
Jones began his professional career in the U.S. Army, where he served as a Field Artillery officer. In 2022, he was appointed as a USAR Military Judge, becoming the only African American male serving in this capacity across all five military branches. Jones continues to serve in the U.S. Army Reserve's Judge Advocate General’s Corps, where he currently holds the rank of Lieutenant Colonel. During his military service, he attended the Military Judge’s Course, Airborne School, Field Artillery Basic Course, Judge Advocate Officer Basic Course, and the Command General Staff College.

=== Public Service ===
Following his active duty military service, Jones transitioned to a legal career, where he worked as a trial lawyer with a focus on civil rights litigation. He represented clients in various legal matters, including the Deceptive Trade Practices Act (DTPA), Title VII of the Civil Rights Act, the Texas Labor Code, personal injury, criminal defense, and military separation boards. Cases in his career include the "Gaslamp" racial discrimination lawsuit and a Texas Whistleblower Act case against Oakbend Medical Center. In addition to his legal practice, Jones has contributed to legal education as an adjunct professor at Texas Southern University's Thurgood Marshall School of Law, where he teaches trial advocacy.

=== Judicial Service ===
On November 6, 2018, Jones was elected as the District Judge for the 180th Criminal District Court in Harris County, Texas, a position previously held by former Harris County District Attorney Pat Lykos. He was re-elected for a second term on November 8, 2022.

== Personal life ==
Jones is married to Audia Jones, an attorney, entrepreneur, and legal counsellor. At the time of their marriage, Audia served as a Counsel Fellow for Sheila Jackson Lee, managing the House Judiciary Committee portfolio.

== Awards and honors ==
Jone's awards and decorations include:

| Award | Description |
| | Combat Action Badge |
| | Bronze Star Medal (with oak leaf cluster) |
| | Meritorious Service Medal |
| | Global War on Terrorism |
| | Global War Expeditionary |
| | Army Commendation Medal (3OLC) |
| | Army Achievement Medal (1OLC) |
| | Overseas Ribbon |
| | Korea Defense Service Medal |
| | Overseas Training Ribbon |
| | National Defense Service Ribbon |
| | Parachutist Badge |
