= Old Market Building (Georgetown, South Carolina) =

- U.S. National Register of Historic Places
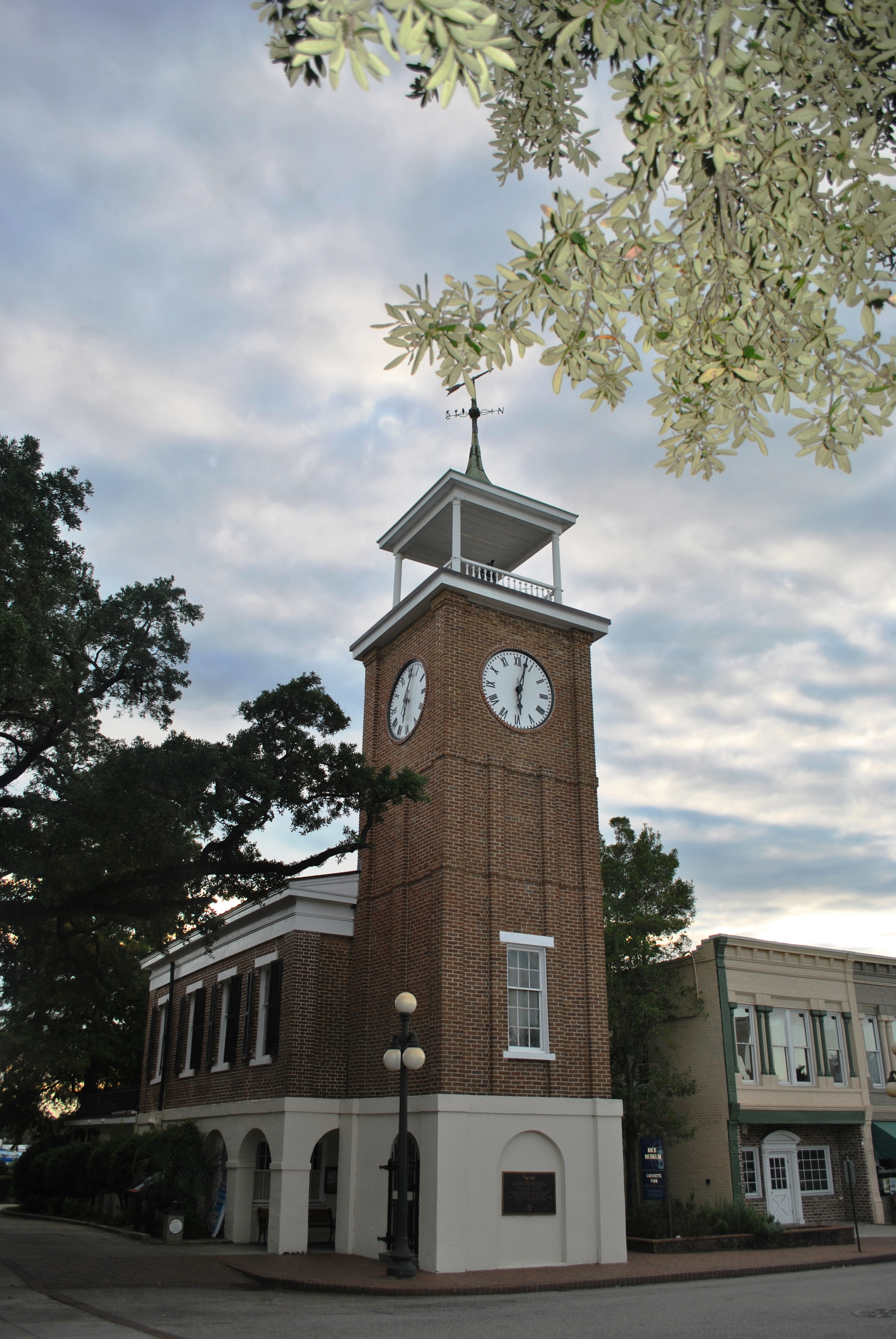

- Location within South Carolina Location within the United States
- Location: Front and Screven Sts., Georgetown, South Carolina
- Coordinates: 33°21′56″N 79°16′57″W
- Area: 0.1 acres (0.040 ha)
- Built: 1832-1835, 1842
- NRHP reference No.: 69000166
- Added to NRHP: December 3, 1969

Old Market Building, also known as the Rice Museum, is a historic public market building located at Georgetown, Georgetown County, South Carolina. It was built in 1832–1835, and is a one-story, Classical Revival temple-form building on a high arcaded base.

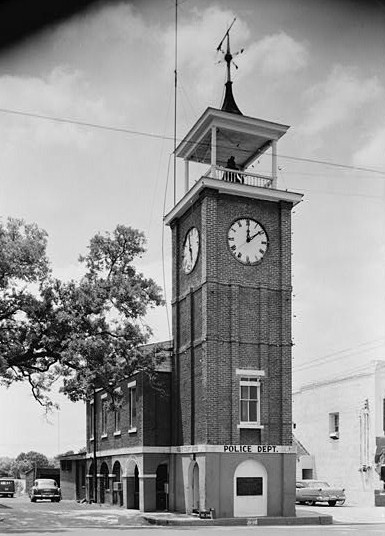
Old Market Building, HABS Photo, May 1958

The arched area was used as an open-air market but was enclosed in the early-20th century. A tower topped by a square stage and an open belfry was added. The tower houses a four-sided clock that was added in about 1842. The building has served as a town hall, a jail, an open-air market, and a slave market.

It was listed on the National Register of Historic Places in 1969.
