= Wicklow Hall =

Historic house in South Carolina, United States

- U.S. National Register of Historic Places
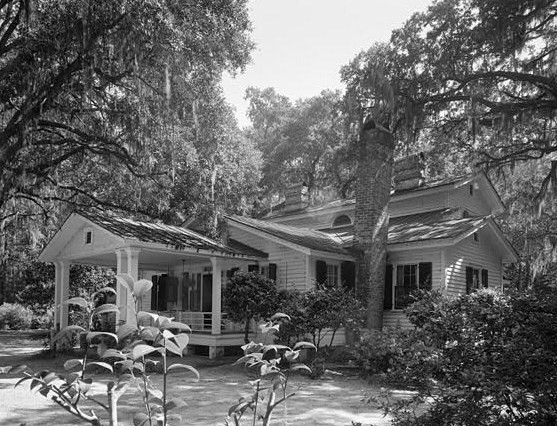
- Wicklow Hall, HABS Photo, October 1977

- Location within South Carolina Location within the United States
- Location: South of Georgetown on South Carolina Highway 30, near Georgetown, South Carolina
- Coordinates: 33°12′50″N 79°18′56″W
- Area: 8.8 acres (3.6 ha)
- Built: c. 1840
- Architectural style: Greek Revival
- NRHP reference No.: 78002511
- Added to NRHP: August 29, 1978

Wicklow Hall is a historic residence constructed in the Southern United States located near Georgetown, Georgetown County, South Carolina. The complex includes the house and several dependencies. Wicklow Hall is a two-story, Greek Revival style clapboard structure on a low brick foundation. The main portion of the structure was around 1850 and enlarged by additions after 1912. Also on the property are a kitchen, corn crib, carriage house, and a playhouse, once believed to be a schoolhouse. Wicklow was part of a rice plantation during the mid-1800s, and associated with the prominent Lowndes family of South Carolina. The rice fields of Wicklow, some 380 to 480 acres, are on the delta between the North and South Santee rivers, but the house is situated on a separate strip of land altogether.

It was listed on the National Register of Historic Places in 1978.
