= Mary Fleming Black =

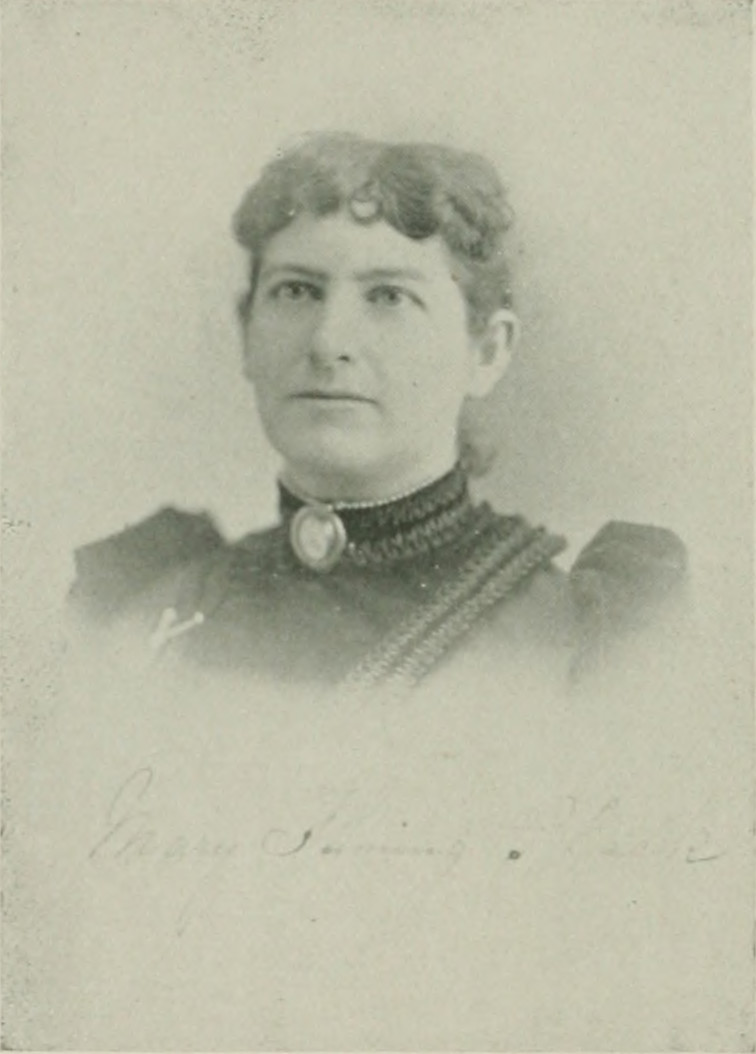
Portrait photo from A Woman of the Century

Mary Fleming Black (née Fleming; pen name, Aunt Mary; 1848–1893) was a 19th-century American author and religious worker. She was the only North Carolina woman in included in A Woman of the Century.

== Early life and education ==
Mary Fleming was born in a Southern Methodist parsonage in Georgetown, South Carolina, August 4, 1848. Her father, Rev. William Honour Fleming, D. D., was a member of the South Carolina Conference of the Methodist Episcopal Church, South, and died while pastor of Bethel Church, Charleston, South Carolina, in 1877. Her parents were both Charlestonians. Her mother, born Agnes A. Magill, was the daughter of Dr. William Magill, a prominent physician of that city. Her mother died when the child was young and the father remarried twice, the children from all the unions living together.

Black's education was begun in one of the city schools of Charleston. She was afterward graduated with honor in Spartanburg Female College, and later took a special course under the instructions of the faculty of Wofford Male College, of which Rev. A. M. Shipp, D.D., LL.D., was president.

== Career ==
On December 9, 1866, she married Rev. William Samuel Black, then a member of the South Carolina Conference. Soon after, when the territory of this state in that conference was transferred to the North Carolina Conference, they came with it, their appointment at that time being in this state. The first ten or twelve years of her married life were spent chiefly in what are became the Charlotte and Wilmington Districts. During that time, three sons and a daughter were born. As the wife of one of the popular ministers of the conference, she discharged the many and delicate duties of that position.

Soon after her removal to Raleigh in 1877, upon her husband's appointment to Edenton Street Church as pastor, a wider opportunity for usefulness presented itself. In May 1878, the general conference authorized the women of the church to do missionary work of their own. She was one of the first to grasp the importance of this step, and almost immediately organized the Woman's Missionary Society of the Methodist Episcopal Church, South in Edenton Street Church. She was elected its president and was retained in that office until her removal to Oxford in 1890. Black served as corresponding secretary of the Woman's Missionary Society of the North Carolina Conference, usually serving as a member of the Missionary Candidates Committee.

In 1882, Black organized the children for missionary service, forming societies which she called "Bright Jewels". Year by year, the work among the children grew in importance and magnitude, attaining at last such proportions that it was thought best to establish a paper for the children, called The Bright Jewel, under Black's management. Here, she assumed the pen name, "Aunt Mary". This continued for some time but was finally bought by and merged into the Little Worker.

She was a prominent and influential member of the Woman's Christian Temperance Union (WCTU) and of the King's Daughters of her State.

Black displayed ability as a writer, her prose and verse productions appearing in various newspapers and periodicals. In 1882, she became the editor of the children's department of the Raleigh Christian Advocate, of which her husband was one of the editors and proprietors. Her history of the Woman's Foreign Missionary Society of the Southern Methodist Church was widely read.

In November, 1890, her husband was elected superintendent of the orphan's home at Oxford. Here another wide field opened before her, which she immediately entered, becoming in many important senses a mother to the more than two hundred children placed under the care of Dr. Black. Her friends warned her of the danger of over-working. But she felt that her duty demanded this additional effort.

== Personal life ==
In the summer of 1893, she fell a victim to nervous prostration. For nine weeks, she was bedridden, racked with pain.

Mary Fleming Black died in Raleigh, North Carolina on October 29, 1893.

== Selected works ==
- Handbook of Missions
