= Charles H. Sperry =

American educator, politician and carpenter

Charles H. Sperry was a teacher, state legislator, and carpenter in South Carolina. He represented Georgetown County in the South Carolina House of Representatives from 1872 to 1874.

He enrolled in law school. In 1880 he was recorded as being a carpenter.
