= Atlantic Coast Lumber Company =

Atlantic Coast Lumber Company was formed in 1899 when the potential value of the vast amounts of standing timber in the Pee Dee River watershed was discovered by a group of Northern lumbermen. Options were taken by the company on this timber and that of surrounding counties. A large sawmill was built west of the city of Georgetown and production began. In 1903, the company was incorporated with a capital of one million dollars.

The mill was expanded through the years, and included three separate sawmills, two shipping wharves, several warehouses, and numerous other buildings, including workers' houses, stores, a hotel, a church, etc. The company owned all of these buildings, making the area immediately surrounding the mill a veritable "company town", (see photo below). In 1913, a disastrous fire destroyed two of the sawmills. A new steel and concrete mill was erected within ten months. At peak production, the company could produce 600,000 board feet (1,400 m^{3}) of lumber per day and was properly proclaimed "the largest lumber manufacturing plant on the Atlantic Coast." Due to the effects of the Great Depression, the plant was closed in 1932.

It was a major undertaking to move millions of tons of rock to the two barrier islands at the entrance to the harbor and build "jetties" of over 11,000 feet on the north and 21,000 feet on the south entrance of the bay, with steam and sail power. A dredge was built to maintain a channel and, coupled with the railway and the river system, the lumber business flourished. Mills sprang up almost overnight. The Atlantic Coast Lumber Company was the largest in the world with its 5,000,000-board-foot (12,000 m^{3}) dock and shed. Turpentine, pine rosin, shingles, furniture - but none as unusual as the DuPont wood alcohol and dynamite mill.
