= Sampit River =

River in South Carolina

Coordinates: 33.3443338°N 79.2719956°W

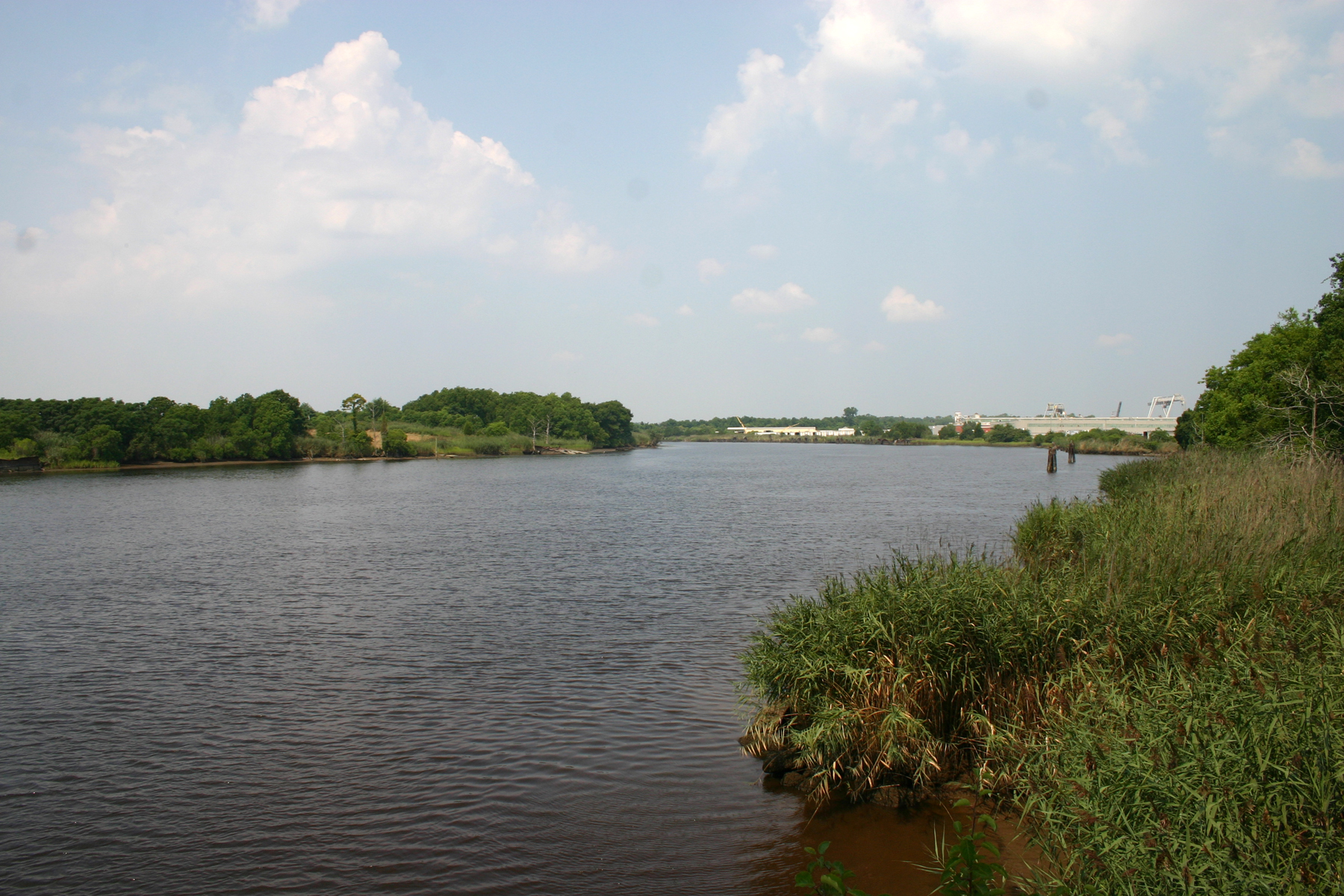
Sampit River (tidal) just above Georgetown

The Sampit River begins in a swampy area of western Georgetown County, South Carolina, USA. It flows in an easterly direction to Winyah Bay at Georgetown. Only small crafts can navigate the upper parts of the river. The lower river merges into the bay and is deepened by tidal flows, and (to Georgetown harbor) by dredging.

During colonial and antebellum years, areas near the river were developed extensively for rice cultivation, on large plantations dependent on labor of African slaves. They created complex earthworks with dams and other elements to irrigate the rice fields using tidewaters. In this and other areas of the Low Country, African Americans developed the Gullah people and culture, a distinct creole culture with strong connections through culture, language and cuisine to West African peoples.

== Invasive species ==
In July 2006, a red-bellied pacu fish (Piaractus brachypomus) was caught in the upper portion of the river. Pacus are relatives of piranhas native to South America. South Carolina DNR officials say this find highlights the danger of individuals releasing non-native fish to the wild. Non-native species can sometimes outcompete local species for habitat and food, killing them off, or introduce diseases, with devastating effects on fisheries.
