= Samuel Green (politician) =

South Carolina reconstruction era American politician

South Carolina House of Representatives
- In office 1870–1875

South Carolina State Senate
- In office 1875–1877

Personal details
- Born: South Carolina
- Party: Republican

Samuel Green (Note: He was also recorded as Samuel Greene including in the Journal of the House of Representatives of the State of South-Carolina 1873-1874) was a carpenter, farmer and state legislator who served in the South Carolina House of Representatives and South Carolina State Senate during the Reconstruction era.

== Biography ==
Green was born enslaved in Beaufort County in either 1825 or August 1847 and was put to work in the fields.

After the American Civil War he worked as a carpenter and a farmer owning a farm on Lady's Island.

In November 1873 Green was appointed adjutant general of the state militia with the rank of major.

== Political career ==
He served in the South Carolina House of Representatives from 1870 to 1875 representing Beaufort County, South Carolina. When Robert Smalls resigned his senate seat in early 1875 Green and fellow representative Nathaniel B. Myers resigned to run for the seat. Green went on to win the election, and served in the South Carolina State Senate from 1875 until 1877.

He was elected as the chairman of the Beaufort County Republican Party September 1876.

Green resigned his senate seat at the end of the 1877 session when the Democrats gained overall control of the legislature.

In 1880 he was made a United States Customs official.

== Death ==
His date of death is unknown but he was listed alive in the 1910 United States census.

== See also ==
- African American officeholders from the end of the Civil War until before 1900
