= Murrells Inlet Historic District =

Historic district in South Carolina, United States

- U.S. National Register of Historic Places
- U.S. Historic district
- Location within South Carolina Location within the United States
- Location: Off U.S. 17, Murrells Inlet, South Carolina
- Coordinates: 33°33′44″N 79°1′14″W
- Area: 585 acres (237 ha)
- Architectural style: Greek Revival
- NRHP reference No.: 80003670
- Added to NRHP: November 25, 1980

Murrells Inlet Historic District is a national historic district located at Murrells Inlet, Georgetown County, South Carolina. The district encompasses 37 contributing buildings and contains a significant concentration of buildings that visually reflect the transition of the area from adjoining estates of two 19th-century rice planters into a 20th-century resort community. The district contains two antebellum houses, which are local interpretations of the Greek Revival style and a collection of early-20th-century vernacular resort buildings. Residential in character, the historic district contains approximately 19 houses. Although they exhibit some diversity, the prevalent use of wood as a building material, the large screened porches, and the setting of moss-draped trees, marshland, and piers provide a visual unity.

It was listed on the National Register of Historic Places in 1980.
