= Georgetown Light =

Lighthouse in South Carolina, US

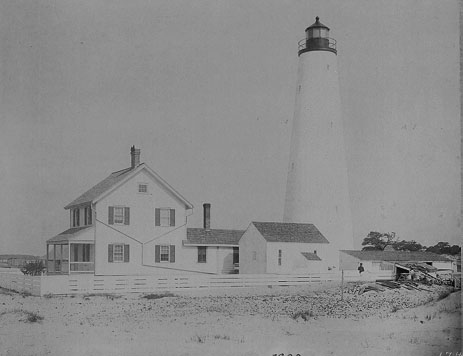
- Location: Winyah Bay, South Carolina
- Coordinates: 33°13′21.47″N 79°11′6.18″W

Tower
- Constructed: 1801
- Foundation: Rubblestone caisson
- Construction: Brick
- Automated: 1986
- Height: 87 feet (27 m)
- Shape: Conical (nb Light List says "cylindrical")
- Markings: White with black lantern
- Heritage: National Register of Historic Places listed place

Light
- First lit: 1812, rebuilt 1867
- Focal height: 85 feet (26 m)
- Lens: 4th order Fresnel (1855), VRB-25 (current)
- Range: 15 nautical miles (28 km; 17 mi)
- Characteristic: Fl W (2), 15 sec
- Georgetown Lighthouse
- U.S. National Register of Historic Places
- Nearest city: Georgetown, South Carolina
- Area: 4 acres (1.6 ha)
- Built: 1801 [sic], actually 1812
- NRHP reference No.: 74001857
- Added to NRHP: December 30, 1974

Georgetown Light is an active light on North Island at the entrance to Winyah Bay southeast of Georgetown, South Carolina. The light is maintained by the U.S. Coast Guard, and the lighthouse is now under the control of State of South Carolina as part of the Tom Yawkey Wildlife Center Heritage Preserve. The lighthouse is on the National Register of Historic Places.

The original lighthouse was a cypress tower. It was destroyed by a storm in 1806. In 1812, a 72 feet (22 m) brick tower was built. A fourth-order Fresnel lens was installed in 1857. It was rebuilt and raised to 87 feet (27 m) in 1867 after suffering damage during the Civil War.

The light was automated in 1986. The focal plane is 85 feet (26 m) above mean high water.

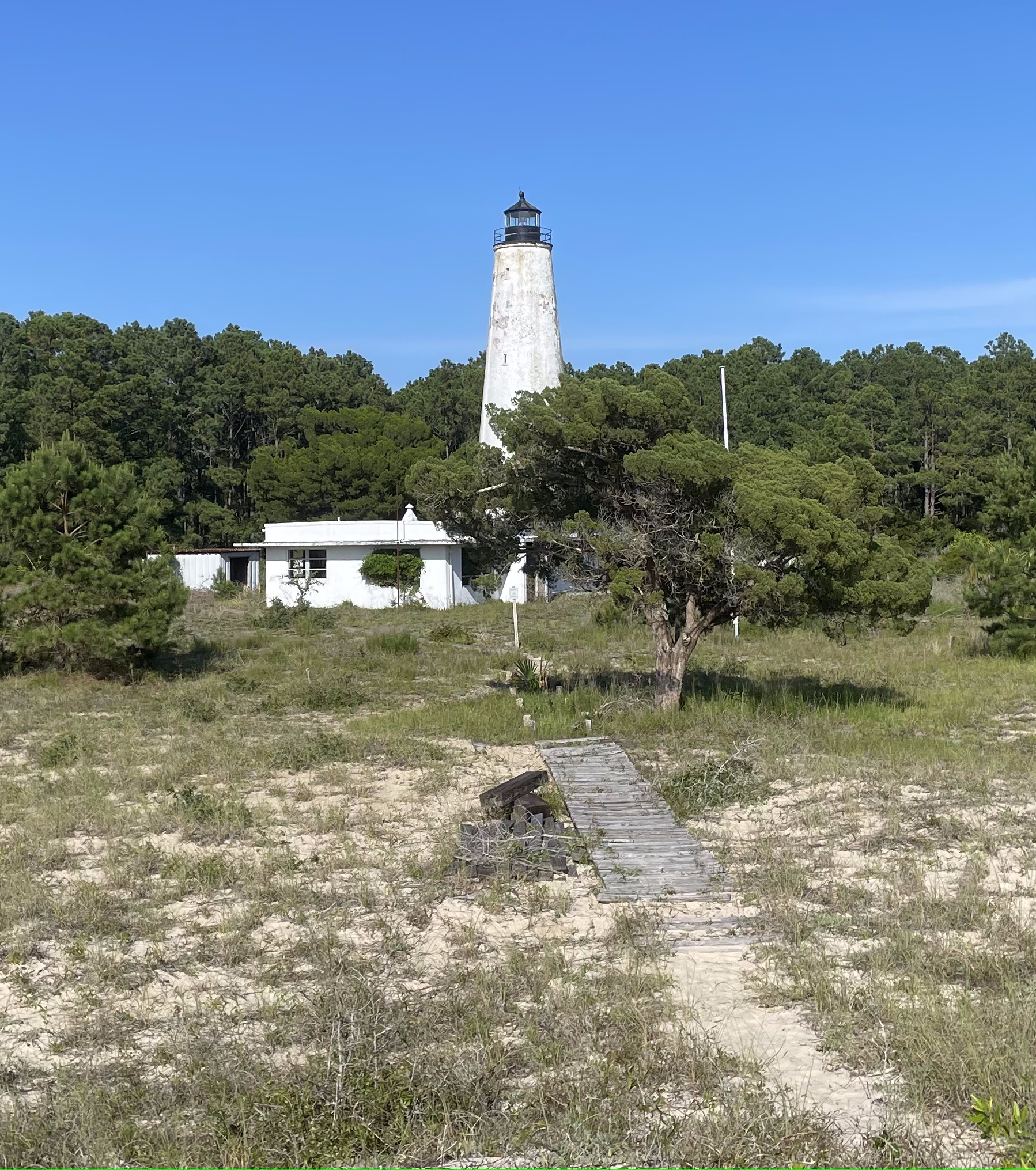
The lighthouse and grounds in 2022
