= Black River (South Carolina) =

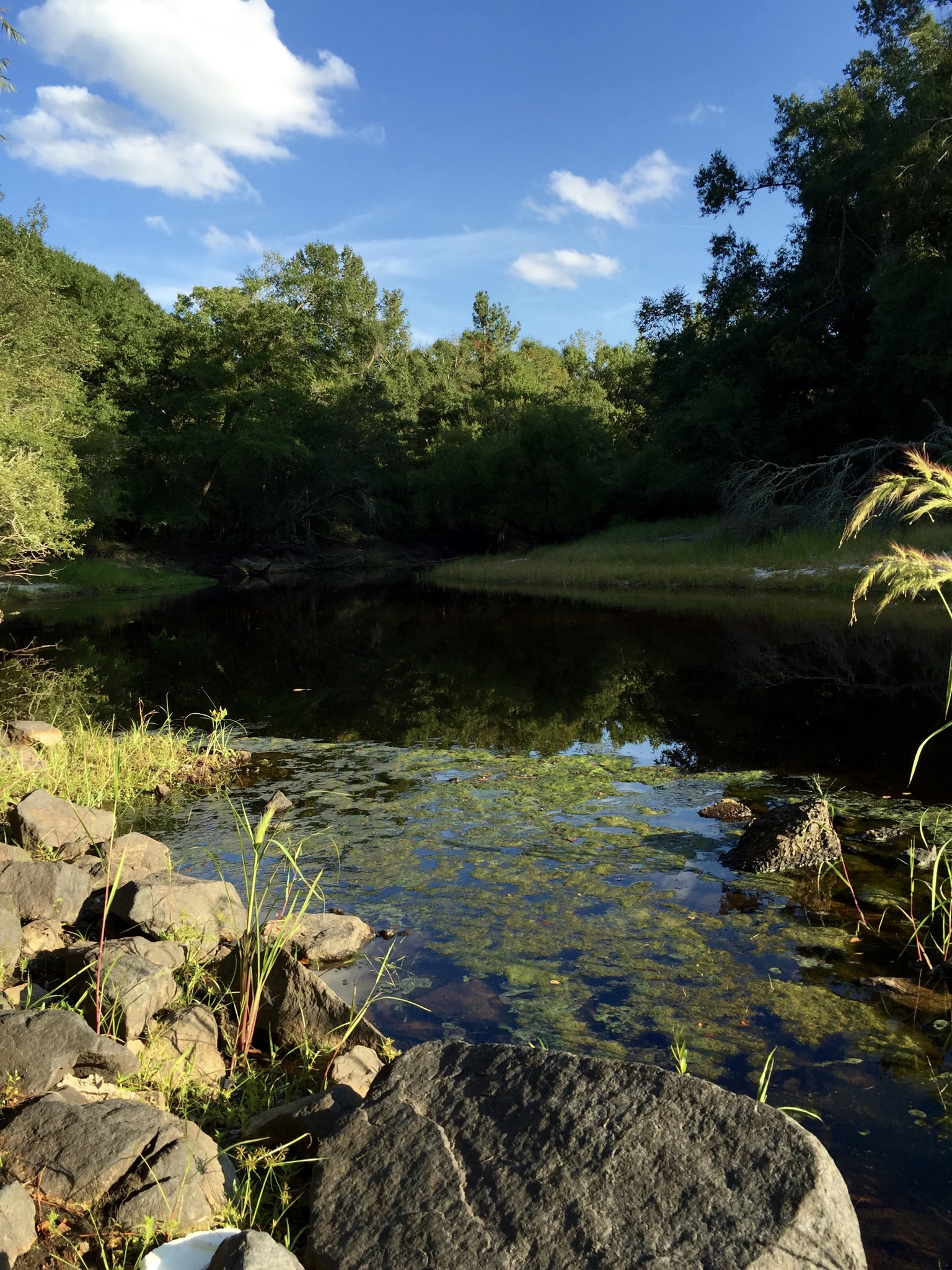
- The Black River at Kingstree, South Carolina

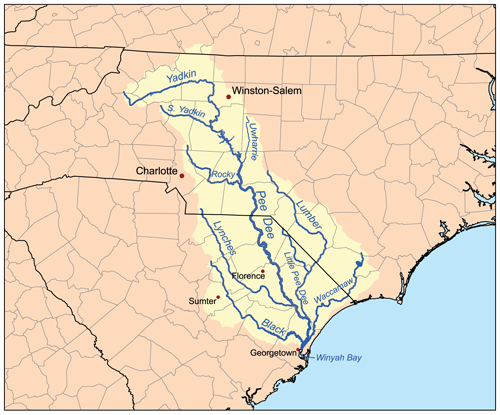
- The Black River
- Native name: Wee Nee

Location
- Country: United States
- States: South Carolina
- Cities: Kingstree, SC, Salters, SC, Andrews, SC, Georgetown, SC

Physical characteristics
- Source: Confluences of Scape Ore Swamp and Cedar Creek
  - location: Near Bishopville, SC
  - coordinates: 34°14′58.31″N 80°22′30.23″W
  - elevation: Approx. 200 ft (61 m)
- Mouth: Pee Dee River
  - location: near Georgetown, SC
  - coordinates: 33°23′56″N 79°14′50″W
  - elevation: 0 ft (0 m)
- Length: 151 miles (243 km)

The Black River is a 151-mile-long (243 km) blackwater river in South Carolina in the United States. It courses through Lee, Sumter, Clarendon, and Williamsburg counties before merging with the Great Pee Dee River in Georgetown County. The river was called the Wee Nee by the Native Americans who once inhabited the area. In June 2001, a 75-mile segment of the river was designated a State Scenic River.

== See also ==
- List of South Carolina rivers
- Mansfield Plantation
