= Georgetown County, South Carolina =

County in South Carolina, United States

- County
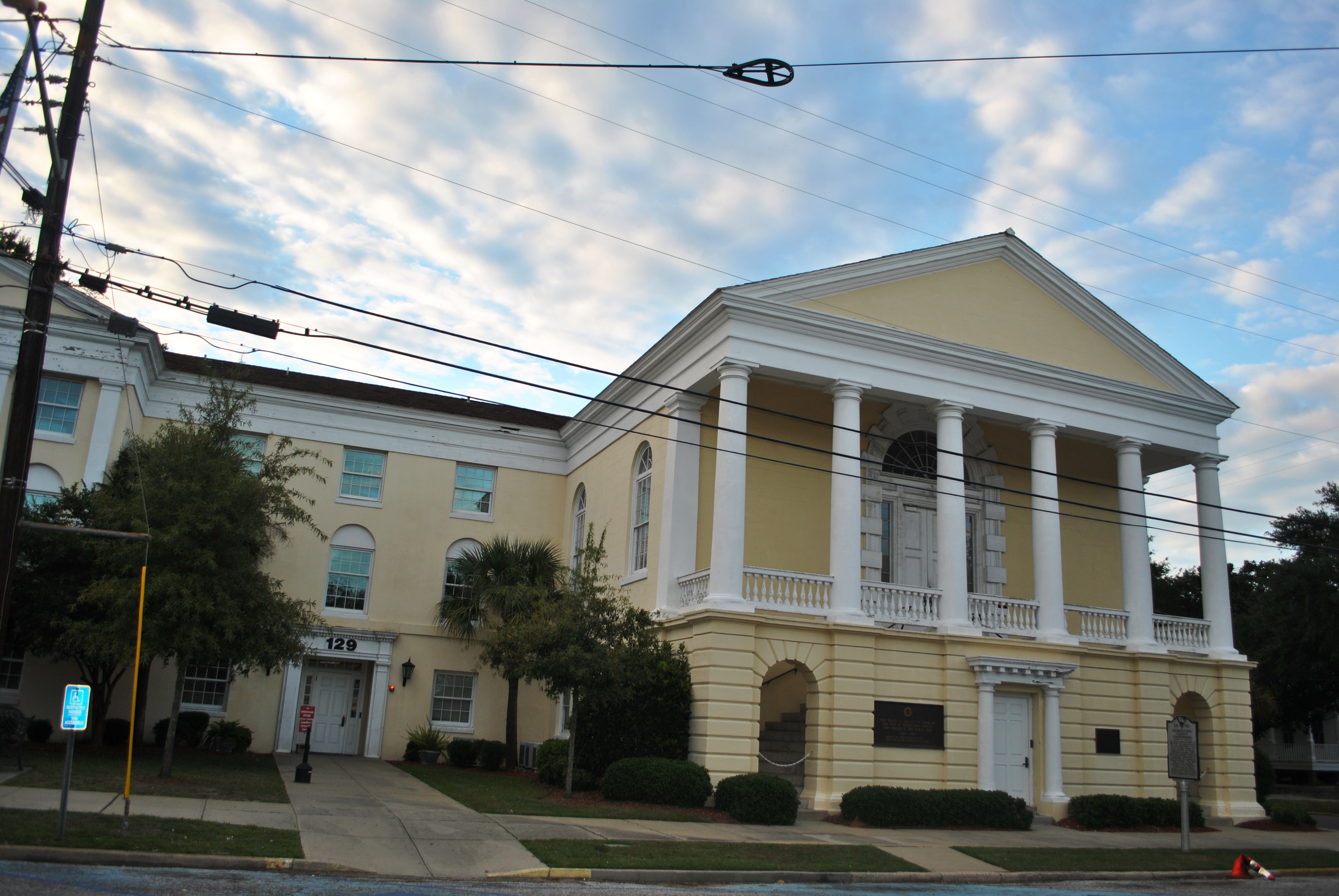
- Georgetown County Courthouse

- Seal Logo

- Location within the U.S. state of South Carolina
- Coordinates: 33.42°N 79.30°W
- Country: United States
- State: South Carolina
- Founded: 1800
- Named for: King George III
- Seat: Georgetown
- Largest community: Murrells Inlet

Area
  - Total: 1,034.83 sq mi (2,680.2 km^{2})
  - Land: 813.61 sq mi (2,107.2 km^{2})
  - Water: 221.22 sq mi (573.0 km^{2}) 21.38%

Population (2020)
  - Total: 63,404
  - Estimate (2025): 65,912 ▲
  - Density: 77.929/sq mi (30.089/km^{2})
- Time zone: UTC−5 (Eastern)
  - Summer (DST): UTC−4 (EDT)
- Congressional district: 7th
- Website: www.gtcountysc.gov

Georgetown County is a county located in the U.S. state of South Carolina. As of the 2020 census, the population was 63,404. Its county seat is Georgetown. The county was founded in 1769. It is named for George III of the United Kingdom. Georgetown County comprises the Murrells Inlet, SC Micropolitan Statistical Area, which is also included in the Myrtle Beach-Conway, SC Combined Statistical Area.

== History ==
The early history of Georgetown County is closely tied to South Carolina's population growth. By an Act passed in 1768, the Province of South Carolina abolished its many counties and implemented just seven large districts with corresponding judicial seats. To be specific, there were too few government officials to have county circuit courts, consider and legislate local issues, and execute the law. Although the districts de facto began in 1768, they only received their official charters in 1769, after approval by the British Parliament of a modified provincial Act. George Town was one of the seven judicial seats, so it was the namesake and remained the seat of Georgetown District until and through the American Revolution. The 1785 County Court Act created 34 counties state-wide, with four counties within Georgetown District. The four subordinate judicial counties of Kingston County, Liberty County, Williamsburg County and Winyah County (named after the Winyah Bay) within Georgetown District were abolished in 1798. All overarching Districts were dissolved in 1800 with the respective areas of each former judicial county reformed with the executive, legislative and judicial functions that previously powered districts, as Horry District (est. 1801), Marion District (est. 1800), Williamsburg District (est. 1804) and Georgetown District (est. 1800). The current county dates its establishment from 1800 for this reason.

The legislative processes instituted by the post-Civil War state constitution provided for a fundamental decentralization of power from state to local control, so the districts were renamed counties – Georgetown District became Georgetown County in 1868. The county is named after its county seat, Georgetown, which was named about 1734 for George III of the United Kingdom, when he was Prince George. The largest community in the county is Murrells Inlet.

The economy is partially based on trade due to its transportation network and port facilities.

== Geography ==
Interactive map of Georgetown County

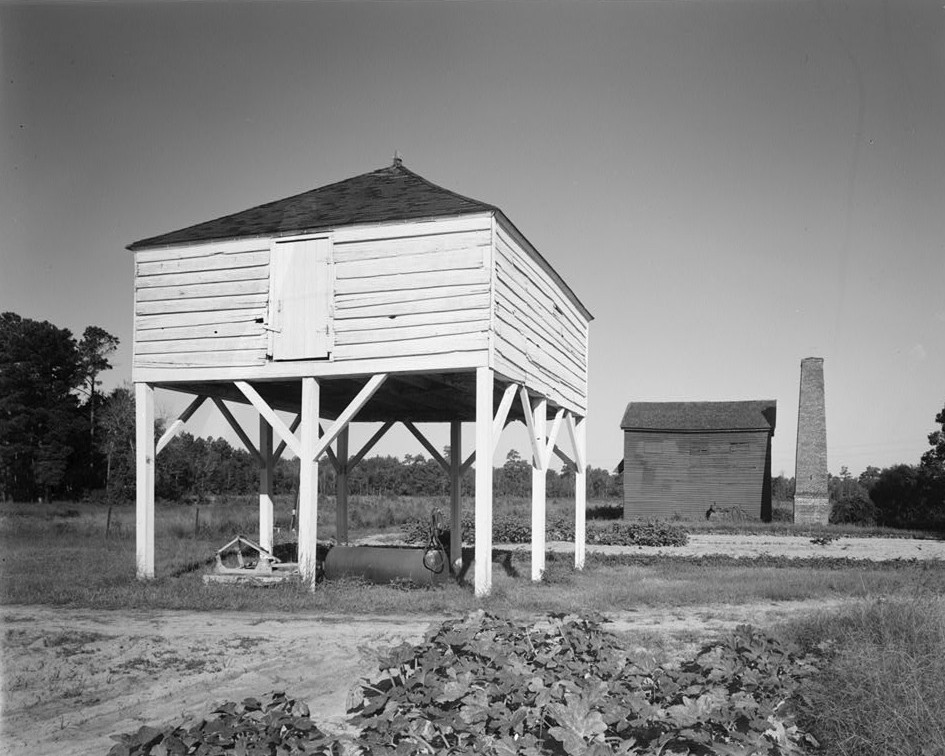
Winnowing house, Mansfield Plantation, Georgetown County

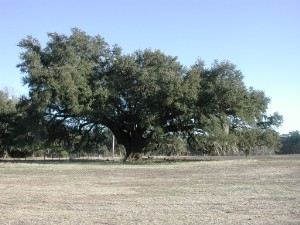
Quercus virginica, Live oak in winter. A pasture in Georgetown County.

According to the U.S. Census Bureau, the county has a total area of 1,034.83 square miles (2,680.2 km^{2}), of which 813.61 square miles (2,107.2 km^{2}) is land and 221.22 square miles (573.0 km^{2}) (21.38%) is water.

Georgetown County has several rivers, including the Great Pee Dee River, the Waccamaw River, Black River, and Sampit River, all of which flow into Winyah Bay. The Santee River, which forms the southern boundary of the county, empties directly into the Atlantic Ocean. The Intracoastal Waterway crosses the county and Winyah Bay. The rivers and the bay have had a decisive effect on human development of the area, especially as the city of Georgetown has an excellent seaport and harbor.

Georgetown County is a diverse county with four distinct areas:

1. The Atlantic coastline, also called Waccamaw Neck, including the communities of Murrells Inlet, Litchfield, Pawleys Island and DeBordieu, is part of "The Grand Strand" (beach), which includes Myrtle Beach to the north. The Georgetown County part of the Grand Strand used to be rural area, but is exploding with development today. Condos line the shoreline at Litchfield and many of the old cottages at Pawleys are being demolished for larger houses. DeBordieu is a gated community.

Empty beachfront has disappeared and wild areas are rapidly vanishing. A few wilder areas are being saved, as these provide critical habitat as part of the Atlantic Flyway for migratory birds. Huntington Beach State Park preserves some of the coastline and coastal marshes in the northern section, with nearby Brookgreen Gardens preserving a historic rice plantation and some forest. Brookgreen Gardens, with a nature center and many outdoor sculptures is a popular tourist spot.

The University of South Carolina and Clemson University maintain the Belle W. Baruch research site at Hobcaw Barony on Waccamaw Neck. The islands around the outlet of Winyah Bay are designated as the "Tom Yawkey Wildlife Center Heritage Preserve". This area is home to the northernmost naturally occurring hammocks of South Carolina's signature sabal palmetto tree.

2. The riverfronts have had little recent development. Such properties were once used for rice plantations, using a rice variety brought from Africa. After the Civil War, and the loss of slave labor, the plantations gradually ceased production. Today they are primarily wild areas, accessible only by boat. In some areas, the earthworks, such as dikes and water gates used for rice culture, still exist, as well as a few of the plantation houses. Litchfield Plantation has been redeveloped as a country inn; other properties have been developed as planned residential communities. Great blue herons, alligators, and an occasional bald eagle can be seen along the waterways. Fishing is a popular activity.

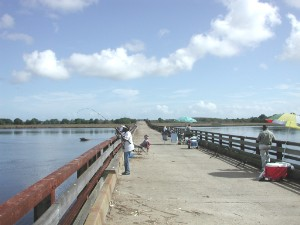
Fishing the Pee Dee off the old US 17 bridge near Georgetown

A tiny community accessible only by boat is on Sandy Island, in the Pee Dee River. Residents are descendants of slaves who worked plantations on the island, and they are trying to keep out development. The Federal government bought land along the rivers for the Waccamaw National Wildlife Refuge, which is intended to protect such wild areas. The visitor center and headquarters of the refuge is located at Yauhannah in the northern part of the county.

3. Georgetown is a small historic city founded in colonial times. It is a popular tourist area and a port for shrimp boats. Yachting "snowbirds" are often seen at the docks in spring and fall; these people follow the seasons along the Intracoastal waterway.

4. The inland rural areas are thinly populated. Some upland areas are good for agriculture or forestry. Several Carolina bays are thought to be craters from a meteor shower. These areas are rich in biodiversity. Carvers Bay, the largest, was extensively damaged by use as a practice bombing range by US military forces during World War II. Draining of the bay has further damaged its environment.

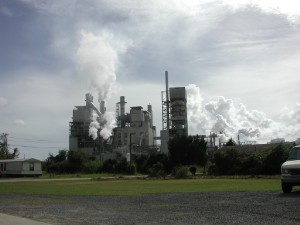
International Paper Company on the Sampit River. It is the largest employer in Georgetown County.

=== National protected areas ===
- North Inlet-Winyah Bay National Estuarine Research Reserve
- Waccamaw National Wildlife Refuge (part)

=== State and local protected areas/sites ===
- Baruch-North Island Reserve
- Bellefield House
- Black River Cypress Preserve
- Brookgreen Gardens
- Friendfield Village
- Georgetown Historic District
- Hobcaw House
- Huntington Beach State Park
- Mansfield Plantation
- Murrells Inlet Historic District
- North Santee Bar Seabird Sanctuary
- Pee Dee River Rice Planters Historic District
- Samworth Wildlife Management Area
- Santee-Delta Wildlife Management Area
- Tom Yawkey Wildlife Center Heritage Preserve
- Wee Tee State Forest (part)

=== Major water bodies ===
- Atlantic Ocean (North Atlantic Ocean)
- Black Mingo Swamp
- Black River
- Great Pee Dee River
- Intracoastal Waterway
- Little Pee Dee River
- Little River
- Long Bay
- Murrells Inlet
- North Santee River
- Sampit River
- Santee River
- South Santee River
- Waccamaw River
- Wadmacon Creek
- Winyah Bay

=== Adjacent counties ===
- Horry County – northeast
- Marion County – north
- Williamsburg County – northwest
- Berkeley County – west
- Charleston County – southwest

=== Major highways ===
- US 17
- US 17 Alt.
- US 17 Bus.
- US 17 Conn.
- US 521
- US 521 Bus.
- US 701
- SC 41
- SC 41 Bus.
- SC 51
- SC 261
- SC 513

=== Major infrastructure ===
- Georgetown Airport
- Port of Georgetown

== Demographics ==
Historical population
Census	Pop.	Note	%±
1790	22,122		—
1800	22,938		3.7%
1810	15,679		−31.6%
1820	17,603		12.3%
1830	19,943		13.3%
1840	18,274		−8.4%
1850	20,647		13.0%
1860	21,305		3.2%
1870	16,161		−24.1%
1880	19,613		21.4%
1890	20,857		6.3%
1900	22,846		9.5%
1910	22,270		−2.5%
1920	21,716		−2.5%
1930	21,738		0.1%
1940	26,352		21.2%
1950	31,762		20.5%
1960	34,798		9.6%
1970	33,500		−3.7%
1980	42,461		26.7%
1990	46,302		9.0%
2000	55,797		20.5%
2010	60,158		7.8%
2020	63,404		5.4%
2025 (est.)	65,912	▲	4.0%
U.S. Decennial Census; 1790–1960 1900–1990; 1990–2000 2010 2020

=== Racial and ethnic composition ===
Georgetown County, South Carolina – Racial and ethnic composition Note: the US Census treats Hispanic/Latino as an ethnic category. This table excludes Latinos from the racial categories and assigns them to a separate category. Hispanics/Latinos may be of any race.
Race / Ethnicity (NH = Non-Hispanic)	Pop 1980	Pop 1990	Pop 2000	Pop 2010	Pop 2020	% 1980	% 1990	% 2000	% 2010	% 2020
White alone (NH)	23,218	26,070	33,011	37,311	41,186	54.68%	56.30%	59.16%	62.02%	64.96%
Black or African American alone (NH)	18,652	19,925	21,393	20,128	18,051	43.93%	43.03%	38.34%	33.46%	28.47%
Native American or Alaska Native alone (NH)	20	49	74	128	111	0.05%	0.11%	0.13%	0.21%	0.18%
Asian alone (NH)	45	54	120	269	258	0.11%	0.12%	0.22%	0.45%	0.41%
Native Hawaiian or Pacific Islander alone (NH)	x	x	16	6	27	x	x	0.03%	0.01%	0.04%
Other race alone (NH)	21	17	25	31	130	0.05%	0.04%	0.04%	0.05%	0.21%
Mixed race or Multiracial (NH)	x	x	239	418	1,416	x	x	0.43%	0.69%	2.23%
Hispanic or Latino (any race)	505	187	919	1,867	2,225	1.19%	0.40%	1.65%	3.10%	3.51%
Total	42,461	46,302	55,797	60,158	63,404	100.00%	100.00%	100.00%	100.00%	100.00%

=== 2020 census ===
As of the 2020 census, there were 63,404 people, 27,231 households, and 17,334 families residing in the county. The median age was 51.9 years; 17.8% of residents were under the age of 18 and 29.7% were 65 years of age or older. For every 100 females there were 89.6 males, and for every 100 females age 18 and over there were 86.6 males age 18 and over.

The county's racial and ethnic composition is summarized in the table above, with 64.96% identifying as white (non-Hispanic), 28.47% as Black or African American (non-Hispanic), and the remainder split among American Indian, Asian, Pacific Islander, other/mixed, and Hispanic or Latino categories.

57.8% of residents lived in urban areas, while 42.2% lived in rural areas.

Of the 27,231 households, 22.9% had children under the age of 18 living with them, 30.4% had a female householder with no spouse or partner present, about 28.2% were made up of individuals, and 15.6% had someone living alone who was 65 years of age or older. There were 35,916 housing units, of which 24.2% were vacant; among the occupied units, 78.7% were owner-occupied and 21.3% were renter-occupied, with homeowner and rental vacancy rates of 1.8% and 12.5%, respectively.

=== 2010 census ===
At the 2010 census, there were 60,158 people, 24,524 households, and 17,282 families living in the county. The population density was 73.9 inhabitants per square mile (28.5/km^{2}). There were 33,672 housing units at an average density of 41.4 per square mile (16.0/km^{2}). The racial makeup of the county was 63.2% white, 33.6% black or African American, 0.5% Asian, 0.2% American Indian, 1.6% from other races, and 0.9% from two or more races. Those of Hispanic or Latino origin made up 3.1% of the population. In terms of ancestry, 13.5% were English, 9.0% were Irish, 8.7% were American, and 7.6% were German.

Of the 24,524 households, 29.1% had children under the age of 18 living with them, 50.8% were married couples living together, 15.6% had a female householder with no husband present, 29.5% were non-families, and 25.4% of all households were made up of individuals. The average household size was 2.43 and the average family size was 2.89. The median age was 45.4 years.

The median income for a household in the county was $42,666 and the median income for a family was $54,115. Males had a median income of $39,127 versus $28,390 for females. The per capita income for the county was $23,942. About 13.2% of families and 19.7% of the population were below the poverty line, including 32.3% of those under age 18 and 11.1% of those age 65 or over.

=== 2000 census ===
At the 2000 census, there were 55,797 people, 21,659 households, and 15,854 families living in the county. The population density was 68 people per square mile (26 people/km^{2}). There were 28,282 housing units at an average density of 35 per square mile (14/km^{2}). The racial makeup of the county was 59.69% White, 38.61% Black or African American, 0.14% Native American, 0.23% Asian, 0.03% Pacific Islander, 0.81% from other races, and 0.49% from two or more races. 1.65% of the population were Hispanic or Latino of any race.

There were 21,659 households, out of which 30.20% had children under the age of 18 living with them, 54.10% were married couples living together, 15.10% had a female householder with no husband present, and 26.80% were non-families. 23.30% of all households were made up of individuals, and 9.20% had someone living alone who was 65 years of age or older. The average household size was 2.55 and the average family size was 3.01.

In the county, the population was spread out, with 25.20% under the age of 18, 7.70% from 18 to 24, 25.90% from 25 to 44, 26.20% from 45 to 64, and 15.00% who were 65 years of age or older. The median age was 39 years. For every 100 females, there were 91.80 males. For every 100 females age 18 and over, there were 88.40 males.

The median income for a household in the county was $35,312, and the median income for a family was $41,554. Males had a median income of $31,110 versus $20,910 for females. The per capita income for the county was $19,805. About 13.40% of families and 17.10% of the population were below the poverty line, including 25.80% of those under age 18 and 14.00% of those age 65 or over.

== Politics ==
Georgetown County was a Democratic stronghold throughout much of the 19th and early 20th centuries. Like a lot of other counties in South Carolina, it began to shift politically in the latter half of the 20th century to the Republican Party.

In recent decades, Georgetown County has become reliably Republican in presidential elections, though Democrats have continued to perform competitively in areas like Georgetown and among African American voters. The last Democratic presidential candidate to carry the county was Bill Clinton in 1996.

In 2024, Kamala Harris received less than 40% of the vote in the county, marking the first time a Democratic presidential candidate has fallen below that threshold since 1956. Donald Trump, meanwhile, secured nearly 60% of the vote—the strongest showing yet for a Republican in presidential elections since 1952.

United States presidential election results for Georgetown County, South Carolina
Year	Republican		Democratic		Third party(ies)	
Year	No.	%	No.	%	No.	%
1900	451	50.28%	446	49.72%	0	0.00%
1904	0	0.00%	728	100.00%	0	0.00%
1912	10	2.21%	405	89.60%	37	8.19%
1916	2	0.42%	470	98.74%	4	0.84%
1920	38	13.43%	245	86.57%	0	0.00%
1924	24	15.00%	134	83.75%	2	1.25%
1928	74	11.21%	586	88.79%	0	0.00%
1932	33	1.92%	1,684	98.08%	0	0.00%
1936	61	4.57%	1,273	95.43%	0	0.00%
1940	155	9.35%	1,503	90.65%	0	0.00%
1944	52	3.69%	1,197	85.01%	159	11.29%
1948	92	3.72%	432	17.49%	1,946	78.79%
1952	2,340	63.07%	1,370	36.93%	0	0.00%
1956	1,057	24.24%	1,020	23.39%	2,284	52.37%
1960	2,607	48.12%	2,811	51.88%	0	0.00%
1964	4,705	57.89%	3,423	42.11%	0	0.00%
1968	3,269	32.62%	4,110	41.01%	2,642	26.36%
1972	6,114	57.27%	4,446	41.64%	116	1.09%
1976	4,058	35.97%	7,169	63.54%	56	0.50%
1980	5,151	42.78%	6,701	55.65%	190	1.58%
1984	7,370	53.29%	6,392	46.22%	68	0.49%
1988	7,032	56.23%	5,402	43.20%	72	0.58%
1992	6,870	42.22%	7,494	46.05%	1,908	11.73%
1996	7,023	42.95%	8,298	50.75%	1,031	6.31%
2000	10,535	51.77%	9,445	46.41%	371	1.82%
2004	12,606	53.43%	10,602	44.94%	385	1.63%
2008	15,790	52.13%	14,199	46.88%	301	0.99%
2012	16,526	53.37%	14,163	45.74%	276	0.89%
2016	17,389	54.93%	13,310	42.04%	958	3.03%
2020	20,487	55.87%	15,822	43.15%	359	0.98%
2024	22,326	59.14%	14,965	39.64%	463	1.23%

== Economy ==
In 2022, the GDP of Georgetown County was $3.3 billion (approx. $50,598 per capita). In chained 2017 dollars, the real GDP of Georgetown County was $2.8 billion (about $41,996 per capita). In 2022 through 2024, the unemployment rate has fluctuated between 2.4-4.9%.

Some of the largest employers in the county include AGRU, Food Lion, International Paper, ScribeAmerica, and Walmart.

Employment and Wage Statistics by Industry in Georgetown County, South Carolina
Industry	Employment Counts	Employment Percentage (%)	Average Annual Wage ($)
Accommodation and Food Services	4,463	18.4	26,000
Administrative and Support and Waste Management and Remediation Services	1,248	5.2	40,664
Agriculture, Forestry, Fishing and Hunting	421	1.7	48,360
Arts, Entertainment, and Recreation	1,420	5.9	25,532
Construction	1,358	5.6	55,016
Finance and Insurance	1,204	5.0	66,144
Health Care and Social Assistance	3,727	15.4	52,364
Information	114	0.5	67,444
Management of Companies and Enterprises	78	0.3	118,924
Manufacturing	2,374	9.8	77,948
Other Services (except Public Administration)	641	2.6	36,556
Professional, Scientific, and Technical Services	1,074	4.4	62,140
Public Administration	1,272	5.3	49,556
Real Estate and Rental and Leasing	697	2.9	39,780
Retail Trade	2,969	12.3	32,448
Transportation and Warehousing	550	2.3	53,196
Utilities	263	1.1	86,580
Wholesale Trade	340	1.4	65,988
Total	24,213	100.0%	46,531

== Communities ==
=== City ===
- Georgetown (county seat)

=== Towns ===
- Andrews (partly in Williamsburg County)
- Pawleys Island

=== Census-designated places ===
- DeBordieu Colony
- Dunbar
- Litchfield Beach
- Murrells Inlet (largest community)
- Garden City (mostly in Horry County)

=== Unincorporated communities ===
- Belle Isle
- Graves
- Hopewell (partly in Williamsburg County)
- Kensington
- Maryville
- North Santee
- Oatland
- Plantersville
- Pleasant Hill
- Prince George
- Sampit
- Sandy Island
- Spring Gully
- Yauhannah

== See also ==
- List of counties in South Carolina
- National Register of Historic Places listings in Georgetown County, South Carolina
- Georgetown County School District
