= Paul Trapier =

American politician

Paul Trapier (1749–1778) was a public official in South Carolina during the American Revolution.

Trapier was born Georgetown, South Carolina, and educated in England. During the American Revolution, he served on the Georgetown Committee of Safety and in the South Carolina Provincial Congress. He was a captain in a militia artillery unit. In 1776 he was elected to the South Carolina General Assembly. The next year he was elected to represent South Carolina in the Second Continental Congress, but never attended a meeting and died the next year.

He is buried in Georgetown in the churchyard of Prince George Winyah Parish Church.
