= Prince George Winyah Parish Church =

Historic church in South Carolina, United States

Prince George Winyah (Anglican) and Churchyard
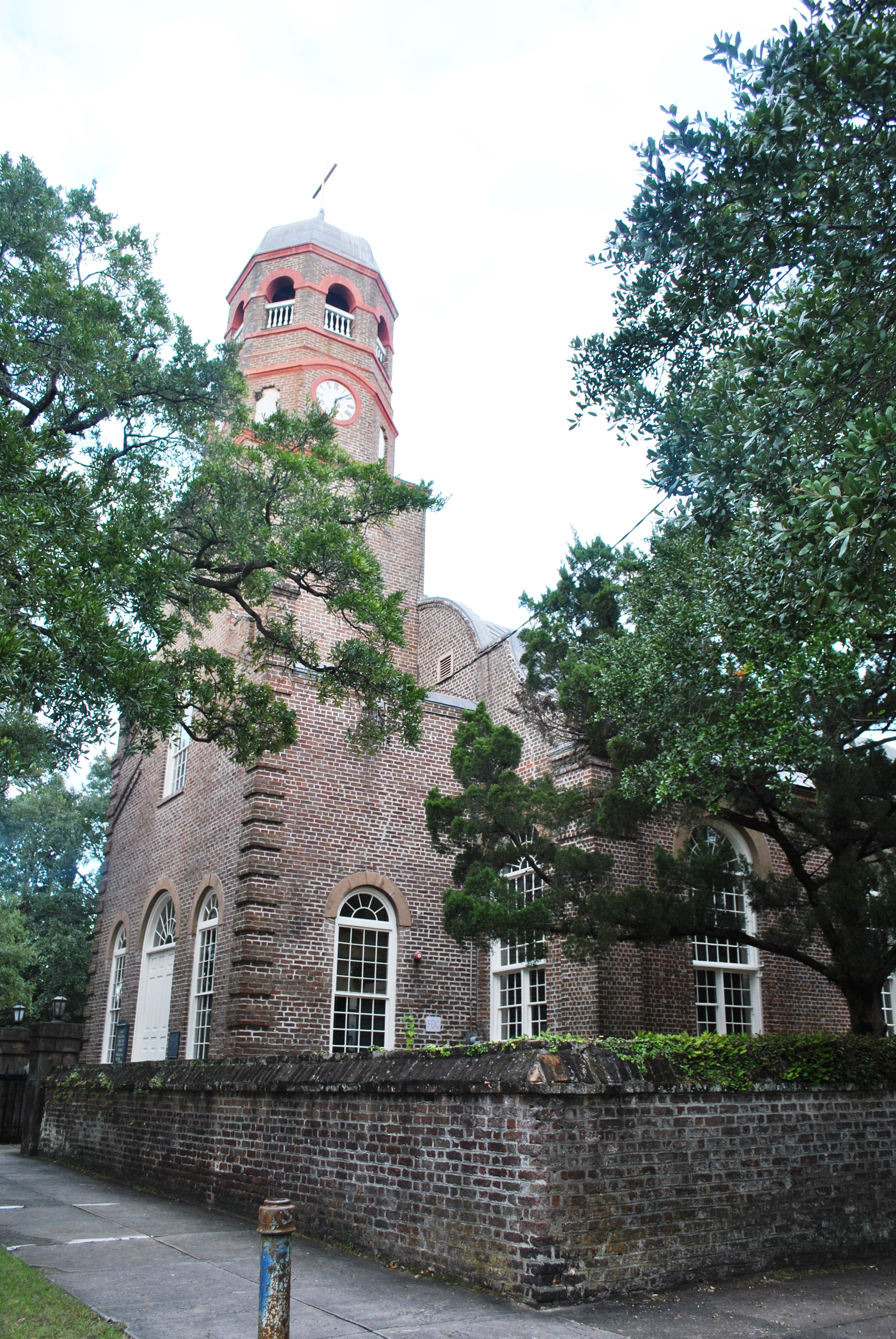

Religion
- Affiliation: Anglican
- District: Anglican Diocese of South Carolina
- Leadership: The Reverend Gary N. Beson
- Status: Active

Location
- Location: Corner of Broad and Highmarket Sts., Georgetown, South Carolina
- State: South Carolina
- Interactive map of Prince George Winyah (Anglican) and Churchyard
- Coordinates: 33°22′8″N 79°16′51″W

Architecture
- Completed: c. 1750

Specifications
- Spire: 1
- Materials: Brick with stone trim

U.S. National Register of Historic Places
- Added to NRHP: May 06, 1971
- NRHP Reference no.: 71000783

Website
- http://www.pgwinyah.org/

Prince George Winyah Parish Church is an Anglican church in Georgetown, South Carolina. Prince George Winyah is one of the oldest continuous congregations in South Carolina, and the church building is one of the oldest churches in continuous service in South Carolina. Prince George Winyah (Anglican) and Churchyard was named to the National Register of Historic Places on May 6, 1971.

Starting in 1716, Anglican parishes were electoral and administration units in South Carolina government. Therefore, Prince George Parish and Prince George Winyah Parish can also refer to an electoral and administrative district that had the same geographic boundaries as this church.

== Early history ==
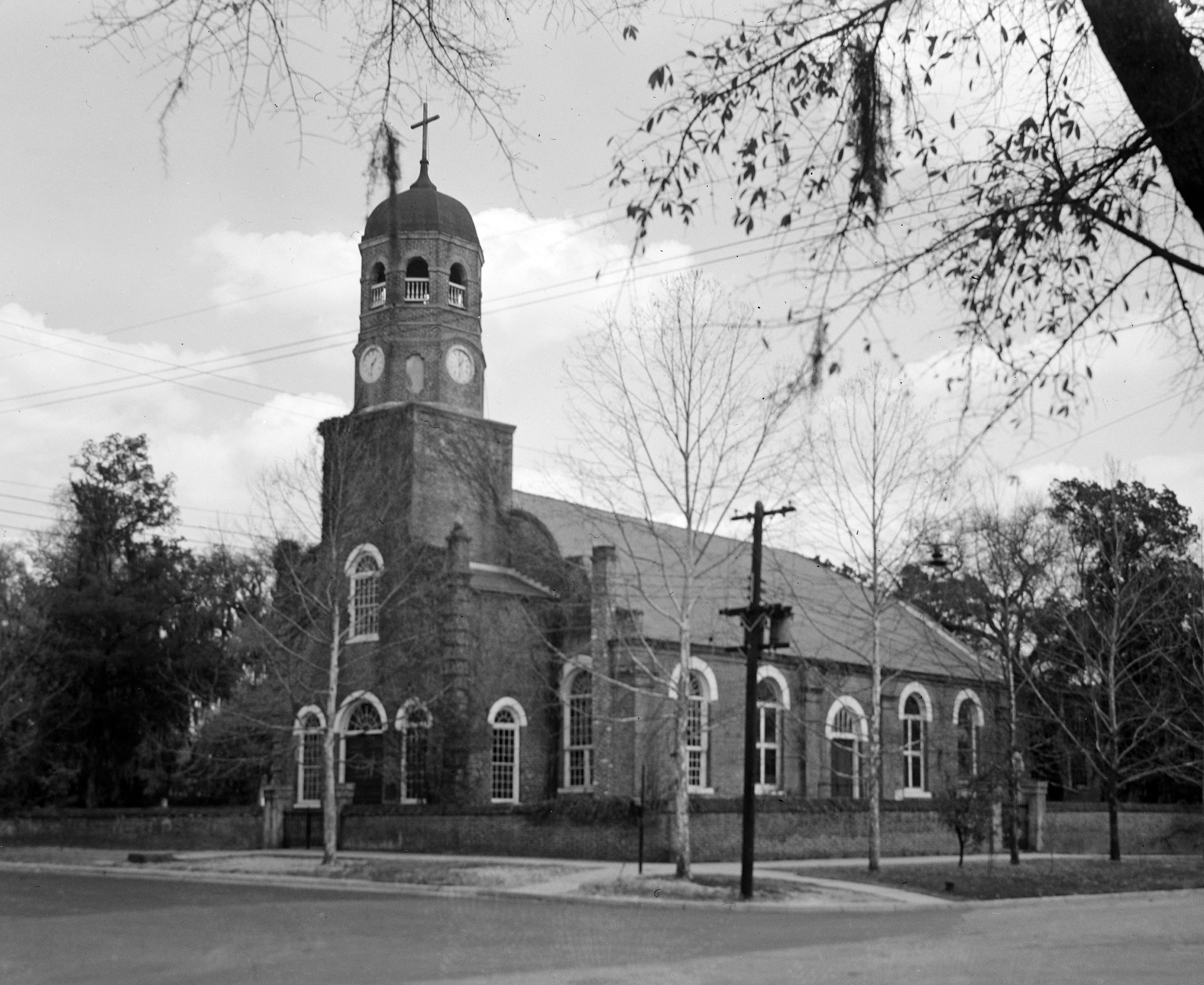
Prince George Winyah

As early colonialist spread across the South Carolina Lowcountry, there was a need of a new parish north of the existing St. James Santee Parish. Prince George Parish was established on March 10, 1721. It was named after the Prince of Wales, who became King George II. There were two potential locations for the church: an inland settlement on the Black River and Winyah on the Sampit River and Winyah Bay at the location of today's Georgetown. In 1726, a wooden church was built inland on a bend of the Black River near Brown's Ferry and twelve miles from the present Georgetown.

On April 9, 1734, the parish was divided to form St. Frederick's Parish. The wooden church was transferred to the new parish.

== Prince George Winyah Church ==
The earliest vestry records for Prince George Winyah are January 13, 1737. A subscription campaign for a new church at Winyah was begun in 1737. This was supplemented by an import tax at the port and £1,000 from the colonial Assembly. Starting in 1740, the bricks were collected. Land was donated by William Screven, who was the first Baptist minister in Carolina, and his son Elisha Screven. Construction was begun in the mid-1750s. The cornerstone was laid in 1745.

The church was built of English red bricks with local oyster shell mortar. The cornerstone was laid on October 30, 1745. The nave has a rectangular plan with five bays. The center bays have side doors with fanlights and the others have windows with fanlights. Brick pilasters flank the side doors and are at the corners of the church. The roof is hipped over the sanctuary and has a Jacobean or Dutch gable at the entrance. The nave has a plastered, barrel-vaulted ceiling. The pews are paneled, wooden box pews. There is a center aisle and a cross aisle at the side doors. The floor is flagstone. The first service was held on August 16, 1747.

The church was occupied by British troops in the Revolutionary War. During the occupation, the church's interior was burned. Tradition also indicates that the church was used for a stable.

A chancel with a semielliptical apse and a gallery was built about 1809. A vestibule entrance with double doors and a tower was constructed in 1824. The brick tower had a square cross section topped with an octangular section with cupola and large cross. A clock and balustraded belfry is in the upper section. A Mohler organ was installed in 1850.

In 1823, Francis Huger Rutledge was ordained a deacon. He eventually became bishop of the Episcopal Diocese of Florida. In 1828, Anthony Toomer Porter, who founded Porter Military Academy in Charleston, was baptized.

On February 25, 1865, the Union Navy occupied Georgetown. The church remained open.

In 1871, the chancel furnishings were replaced and the altar was enlarged. In 1874, the church was given a bell and a clock. A stained glass window from St. Mary's Chapel at Hagley on the Waccamaw was installed.

In 2012, Prince George disaffiliated from the older Episcopal Church and associated itself with the theologically conservative Anglican Church in North America.

== Churchyard ==
The churchyard is surrounded by a brick wall and contains the cemetery. In addition to parishioners and clergy of Prince George Winyah, the cemetery has the graves of several notable South Carolinians: Paul Trapier, who was a patriot and was elected to the Second Continental Congress; James H. Trapier, who was a brigadier general in the Confederate Army, Rev. Dr. Anthony T. Porter; Capt. Roger Shackelford, born in North Carolina and among the early Shackelford family of Georgetown; and Governor Robert F. W. Allston.
