= Springwood Cemetery =

Historic cemetery in Greenville County, South Carolina

- U.S. National Register of Historic Places
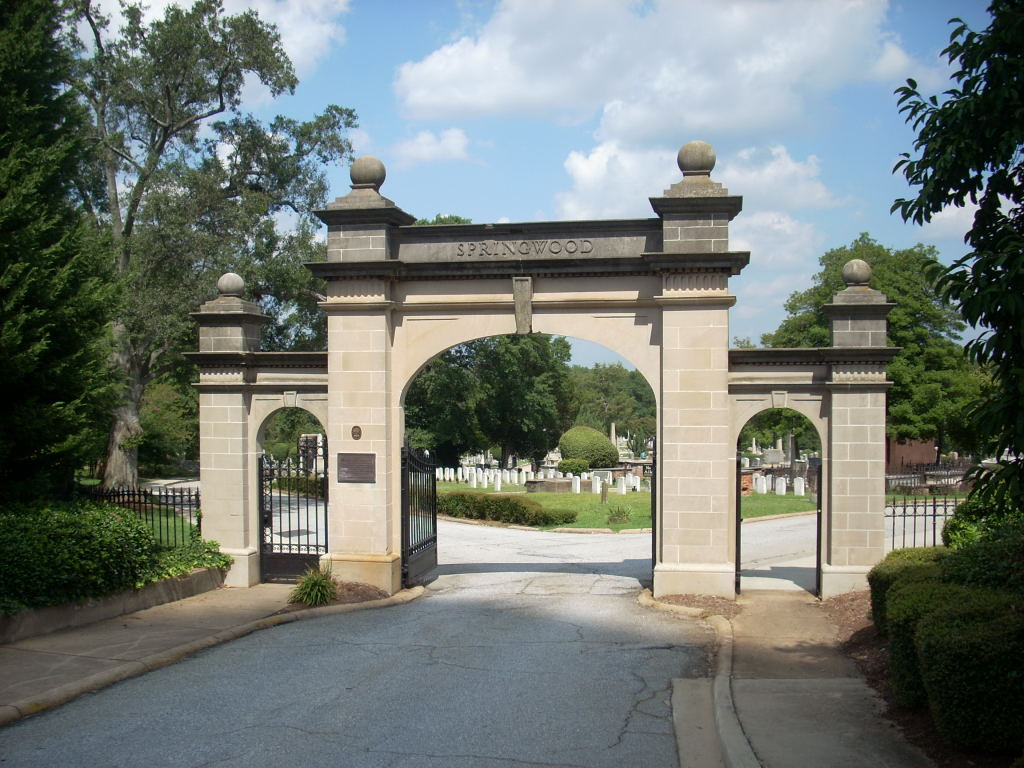
- Springwood Cemetery Main Gate (1914)

- Location within South Carolina Location within the United States
- Location: 400 North Main Street, Greenville, South Carolina
- Coordinates: 34°51′18″N 82°23′46″W
- Area: 30 acres (12 ha)
- Architect: G. L. Norrman
- NRHP reference No.: 05001156
- Added to NRHP: October 4, 2005

Springwood Cemetery is an American historic cemetery in Greenville, South Carolina, listed on the National Register of Historic Places. It is the oldest municipal cemetery in the state and has approximately 7,700 marked, and 2,600 unmarked, graves.

The first burial in what today is Springwood Cemetery occurred in July 1812, after Elizabeth Blackburn Williams (1752–1812), the mother-in-law of prominent early Greenvillian Chancellor Waddy Thompson, expressed a desire to be buried in the family garden. Many other burials occurred in the area after Thompson sold 60 acres of his property to one Francis H. McLeod in 1817. In 1829 McLeod opened the private graveyard to the public, and in 1833, he conveyed a tract of land to the city for use as a cemetery. The city acquired additional acres during the 1870s, and the last five acres of the cemetery were purchased before 1944. Presumably the cemetery was named for a spring that was once included in, or was just beyond, its boundaries.

The 200-year-old cemetery includes "a comprehensive collection of gravemarker types," including field stones, raised masonry tombs topped with stone ledgers, Victorian monoliths, and Veterans Administration markers. Eighty unknown Confederate soldiers are buried near the entrance, presumably soldiers who died of wounds or disease after being removed to one of the two Greenville buildings used for hospitals during the Civil War.

Springwood retains its rural cemetery design elements and the 1876 landscape planning of prominent New South architect G. L. Norrman. The entrance gate, designed by local architect James Lawrence and built of Indiana limestone, was completed in 1914. Just outside the Main Street entrance, in its own pocket park, is a Confederate monument that from 1891 to 1923 stood in the middle of Main Street.

The northeast corner of the cemetery, which was used as a potter's field for African Americans and indigent whites has perhaps only a dozen remaining headstones, although the area is believed to contain hundreds of graves. In 1969 the City of Greenville extended Academy Street through this section and removed the remains of approximately 250 to 275 people.

Although burials continue, no new plots have been sold since the 1970s. The city of Greenville contributes to the maintenance of the cemetery, but there is no perpetual care fund, and the graves themselves remain private property. A "Friends of Springwood Cemetery" organization was formed in 2002 to raise awareness of cemetery needs.

== Notable Interments ==
- Martin Frederick Ansel, 89th Governor of South Carolina.
- Charles R. Attwood, pediatrician, promoter of vegetarianism.
- John Dickson Carr, mystery writer.
- Charles E. Daniel, construction company executive and interim U. S. Senator.
- John D. Hollingsworth, textile machinery executive and philanthropist.
- Butch Lindley, NASCAR driver.
- Basil Manly, Sr., Baptist clergyman and educator.
- John J. McSwain, U. S. Representative.
- Roger C. Peace, newspaper publisher and interim U. S. Senator.
- Mary Camilla Judson, educator at Furman University

== Further reading/external links ==
- Lucile Parrish Ward, God's Little Acre on Main Street: Springwood Cemetery (Greenville, SC: A Press, 2003)
- Masterplan for Springwood and Richland Cemeteries (2003)
- Springwood Cemetery Interment Locator
