= John D. Hollingsworth =

- Born: December 26, 1917; Atlanta, Georgia, U.S.
- Died: December 30, 2000 (aged 83); Greenville, South Carolina, U.S.
- Resting place: Springwood Cemetery
- Known for: Textile machine manufacturing, philanthropy
- Spouse(s): Ella Mae Bennett, c. 1944
- Children: 1 daughter

John Dargan Hollingsworth Jr. (December 26, 1917 – December 30, 2000) was an American businessman, textile machinery inventor, and philanthropist.

== Background and early life ==
Hollingsworth was born in Atlanta, Georgia, but moved to Greenville, South Carolina, as a small child. During the last decade of the 19th century, Hollingsworth's grandfather, Pinckney Carson Hollingsworth, traveled between textile mills repairing carding machines, a business inherited by Hollingsworth's father, John D. Hollingsworth Sr. (1878–1942), and one in which Hollingsworth Jr. participated from an early age. Hollingsworth graduated from Greenville High School and spent one lackluster year as a student at Furman University. But following his father's death in 1942, he and his mother inherited the business.

== Career ==
In January 1944, Hollingsworth received his first patent for "an invention that allowed textile machinery to better process synthetic fibers." Shortly thereafter he was both drafted into the U.S. Navy and married his bookkeeper, Ella Mae Bennett, who managed the business in his absence. In the 1950s, Hollingsworth perfected metallic card clothing, revolutionizing the textile carding process. He also purchased and rebuilt used cards for sale. Though Hollingsworth products and his reputation for excellent service soon made him a wealthy, internationally significant manufacturer of textile machinery, he could be a slapdash businessman. In 1964, a newly hired accountant was horrified to discover that although Hollingsworth's company had annual sales of about $9 million, the business was not incorporated and Hollingsworth had kept no accounting books. Hollingsworth was also overly enamored of innovative textile machinery and made many uneconomical purchases.

Nevertheless, Hollingsworth used his wealth to invest in land, spending forty years amassing 42,000 acres. In 1989, he was reputedly the largest private landholder in South Carolina, and Forbes listed him as one of the 400 wealthiest Americans.

== Personal life ==
Hollingsworth's accountant called him "very private, secretive, a perfectionist, and a genius." In 1964 Hollingsworth accused his wife and only daughter of stealing more than a half million dollars from his office, and thereafter they remained permanently estranged—though the wife and daughter were acquitted after he refused to testify against them at trial. For many years thereafter, Hollingsworth lived in eccentric simplicity, making his home in an Airstream trailer behind his plant and driving a Volkswagen Rabbit. Yet he was generous to his employees and kept a warehouse full of boxed toys.

== Death and philanthropy ==
Hollingsworth died suddenly in 2000. He had specified that his funeral be private with no obituary notice, and he was quietly buried beside his parents in Springwood Cemetery. In 1976, Hollingsworth had established a charitable foundation, Hollingsworth Funds; and at his death, the bulk of his estate, between $290 million and half a billion dollars, passed to the foundation, which was required to make annual distributions to Furman University (45%), the YMCA of Greenville (10%), and public charities of Greenville County (45%). The announcement of his massive gift to Greenville came as a "stunning surprise."
