= James H. Trapier =

United States Army officer

James Heyward Trapier
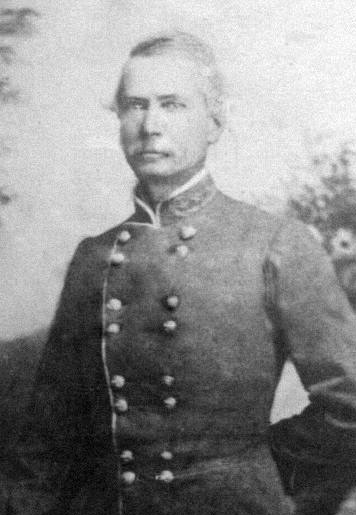
- James Heyward Trapier
- Born: November 24, 1815; Georgetown County, South Carolina
- Died: December 21, 1865 (aged 50); Georgetown, South Carolina
- Burial place: Prince George Winyah Churchyard, Georgetown, South Carolina
- Military career
- Allegiance: United States of America; Confederate States of America
- Branch: United States Army; Confederate States Army
- Service years: 1838–1848 (USA); 1861–1865 (CSA)
- Rank: First Lieutenant (USA); Brigadier General (CSA)
- Conflicts: Mexican–American War; American Civil War

James Heyward Trapier (November 24, 1815 – December 21, 1865) was a career United States Army officer, who fought during the Mexican–American War. He also served as a Confederate general during the American Civil War, dying shortly after its conclusion.

== Early life and career ==
Trapier was born in 1815 at a plantation called "Windsor," located along the Black River near the city of Georgetown, South Carolina. In 1834, he attended the United States Military Academy at West Point, and graduated four years later, standing third out of 45 cadets. P.G.T. Beauregard, whom Trapier would serve under later in life, placed second in this same class. He was commissioned a second lieutenant in the 1st U.S. Artillery on July 1, 1838. Six days later, Trapier transferred to the Engineer Corps, and he was promoted to the rank of first lieutenant on July 1, 1839. He was a cousin of Thomas F. Drayton.

In his work for the Engineers, Trapier helped in the construction of defenses on the coastline of the United States. He also served in the Mexican–American War from 1846–1848, and he would resign his commission on February 28, 1848. After tendering his resignation, Trapier moved back to his plantation in South Carolina and became a planter. He also was active in the South Carolina State Militia, rising to the rank of colonel and serving as the militia's aide-de-camp. As the chief of ordnance of South Carolina, Trapier "ensured that the state was well-armed."

== Civil War service ==
At the start of the American Civil War in 1861, Trapier chose to follow his home state and the Confederate cause. He entered the Confederate Army in January, assigned as a captain in the Engineers as well as aide-de-camp to South Carolina's Governor Francis W. Pickens. He then began his service under Brig. Gen. Beauregard, becoming part of his staff in April and Chief Engineer of the newly formed Department of South Carolina until November. While there he aided Beauregard in the construction of artillery batteries within Charleston Harbor, and on June 19 he was promoted to major and was assigned assistant quartermaster.

Trapier was promoted to the rank of brigadier general on October 21, 1861. He was given command the District of Middle and Eastern Florida from November 5 until March 14 of the following year. He then was ordered to the Western Theater and Gen. Albert Sidney Johnston's Army of the Mississippi, with Brig. Gen. Joseph Finegan taking over his district command in April. Trapier was assigned to lead the 4th Brigade of the 2nd Division in Maj. Gen. Braxton Bragg's II Corps in March. Gen. Beauregard assumed command of the Army of the Mississippi upon Johnston's death at Shiloh and led it during the First Battle of Corinth in late April.

Trapier was then temporarily given command of the 1st Division of the I Corps on April 14 when its commander, Charles Clark, fell ill. When Clark recovered, Trapier was then given temporary command of the 2nd Division of Bragg's II Corps, and led it in this capacity during the Battle of Farmington. Trapier's performance during the Union siege at Corinth was highly criticized and Bragg, now the army commander, ordered him relieved of command and sent him home for duty in South Carolina. In November 1862, Trapier was given command of the Fourth Military District of South Carolina, headquartered in Georgetown. This district encompassed the area from the North Carolina line to the Santee River. Trapier strengthened the defense of this district by placing troops in coastal fortifications, notably Battery White, which guarded Winyah Bay.

In April 1863, Trapier was called by Gen. P.G.T. Beauregard, who at this time commanded at Charleston, to command the garrison located on Sullivan's Island during Union Admiral Samuel DuPonts' naval assault on the city. DuPont's attack failed and, with Charleston safe, Trapier reported back to Georgetown.

After April 1863, Trapier performed well in the command of the district although constantly plagued by a lack of supplies and troops. Trapier asked the Confederate government repeatedly for extra troops to defend this district; however, the government allocated what extra troops it had to more active theaters.

Trapier's district was unmolested until February 25, 1865, when Union Admiral John Dahlgren's fleet sailed into Georgetown's harbor and captured the town. Trapier evacuated the town and its outlying fortifications previous to its occupation in concurrence with the surrender of Charleston. On March 1, 1865, Admiral Dahlgren's flagship, the USS Harvest Moon, struck a torpedo that had been placed there by Trapier's orders. The admiral was uninjured but the Harvest Moon sank.

There is no record showing Gen. Trapier was ever captured or paroled. Trapier was not with Confederate forces under Gen. Joseph Johnston in North Carolina at the time of surrender.

== Postbellum and death ==
After the end of the war, Trapier returned to farming in South Carolina. He died at the age of 50 during the winter of 1865 at the home of a friend in Georgetown. He was buried there in the cemetery of Prince George Winyah Churchyard.

== See also ==
- List of American Civil War generals (Confederate)
