= Confederate Monument (Greenville, South Carolina) =

Soldier statue in Greenville

Coordinates: 34°51′18″N 82°23′48″W

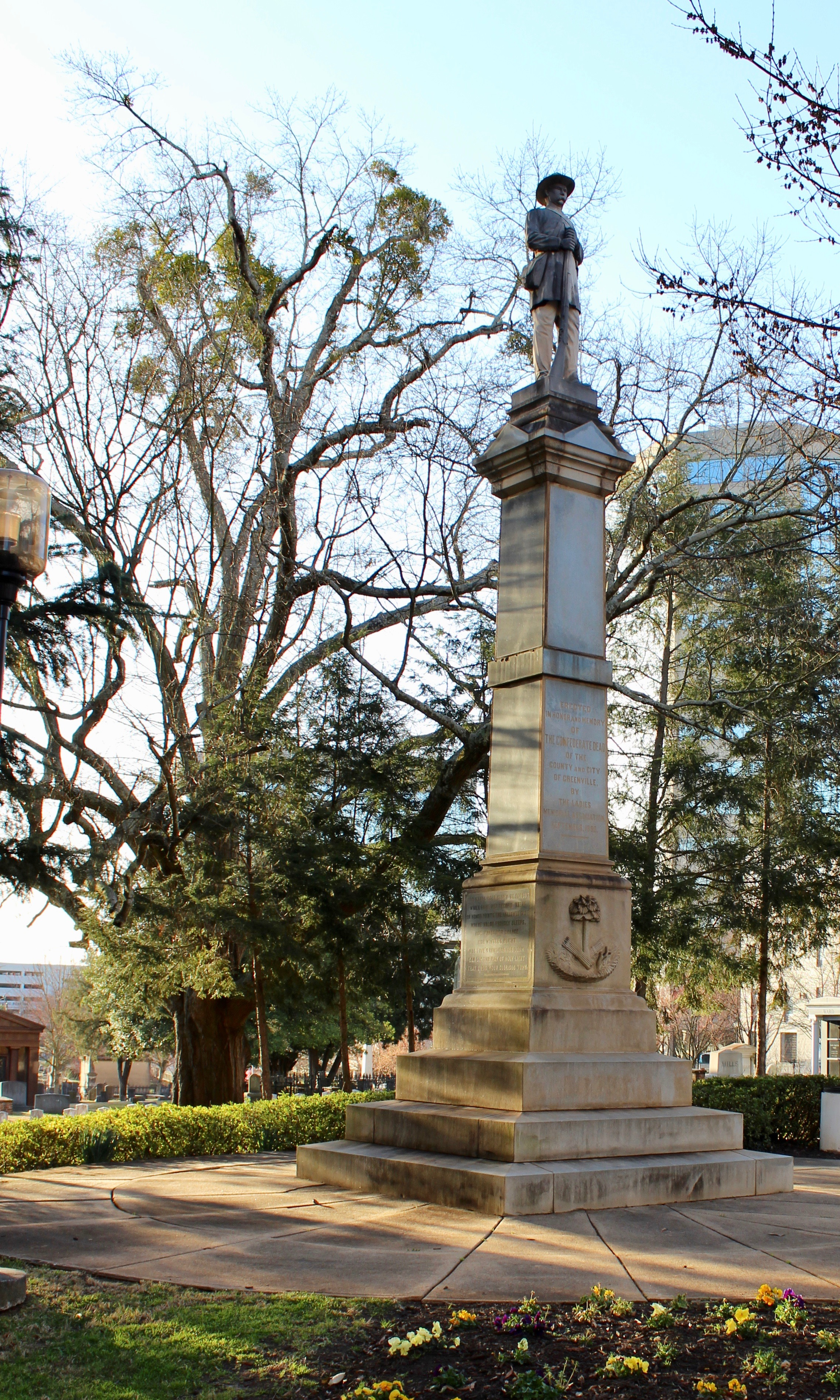
Confederate monument, Greenville, South Carolina, 2021

The Confederate Monument (Greenville, South Carolina) is a shaft of granite topped by a marble statue of a soldier—the oldest public sculpture in Greenville—that memorializes the Confederate dead of the American Civil War from Greenville County, South Carolina. The monument is flanked by two period Parrott rifles manufactured at the West Point Foundry.

== History ==
In 1892, following eight years of fund raising by the local Ladies Memorial Association, the $3,500 monument (more than $100,000 in early 21st century dollars) was erected at the intersection of North Main and College Streets with a statue said to have been sculpted by one C. F. Kohlrus of Augusta, Georgia, from photographs of the by-then middle-aged Confederate veteran and Greenville police chief James B. Ligon (1837-1908). The monument was dedicated on September 27, 1892, with ceremonies, speeches, and a grand parade. Railroads provided reduced rates to members of state military companies, who while attending the dedication, fired their weapons and gave the rebel yell. The Columbia State called the monument “one of the handsomest and costliest in the South.”

The Greenville Confederate monument well represents the contemporary Southern Lost Cause interpretation of the Civil War. One sentence inscribed on the shaft reads: “The world shall yet decide in truth’s clear far off light that the soldiers who wore the grey and died with Lee were in the right.”

By 1919, with the coming of the streetcar and the automobile, the monument in the middle of Main Street had become a traffic hazard. Nevertheless, when city council voted to move it, the local chapter of the United Daughters of the Confederacy (UDC) and Confederate veterans strenuously objected. On October 11, 1922, after learning that opponents were seeking a restraining order to prohibit the move, members of the city council had the shaft partially dismantled and the statue hidden. Although demolition ceased after a temporary injunction prohibiting the move was served on the mayor, the statue-less remnant of the shaft remained in place on Main Street for almost two years.

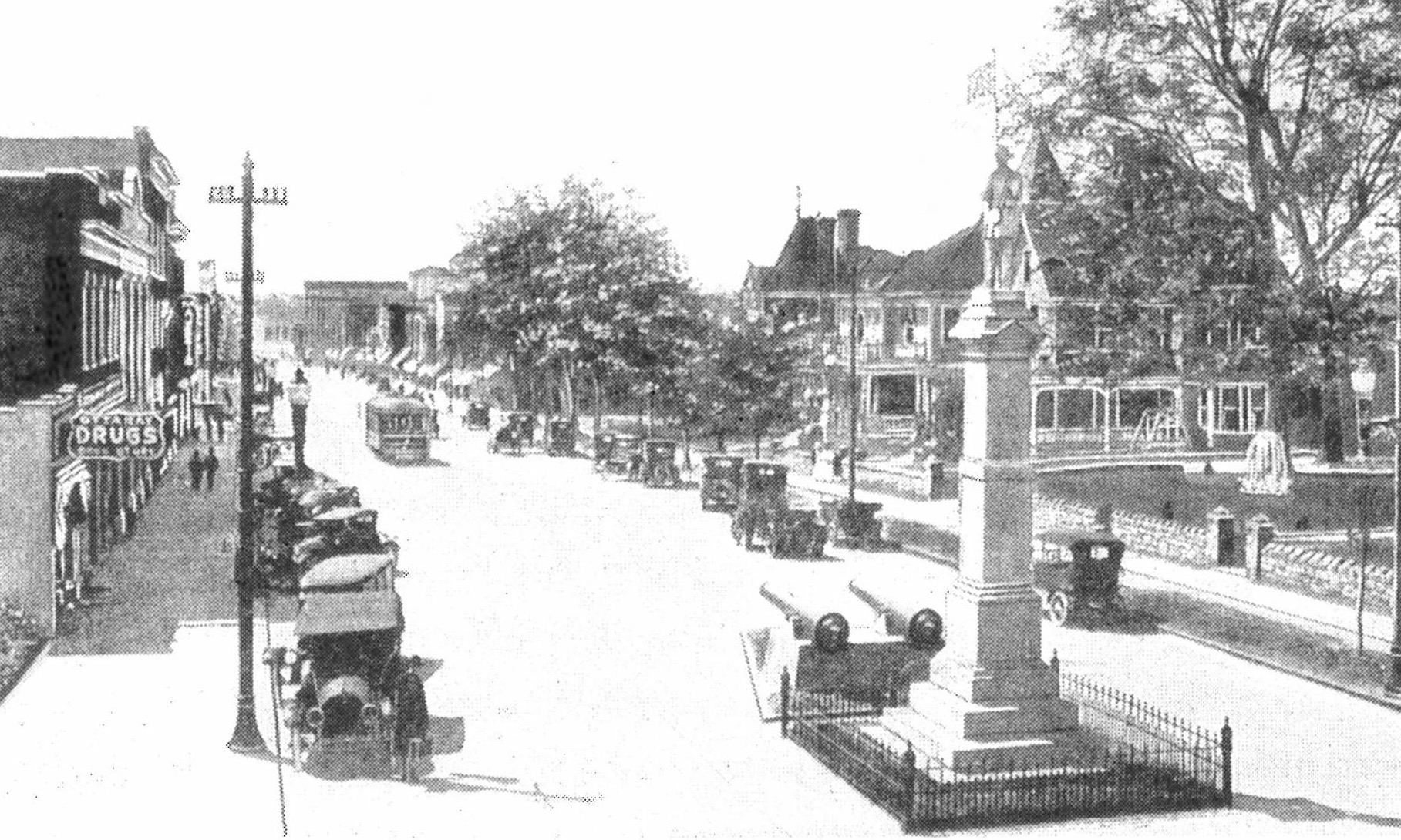
Confederate Monument, Greenville, SC, in its original location in the center of Main Street, c. 1918.

On June 9, 1924, the South Carolina Supreme Court unanimously ruled that the city had the right to determine use of its streets and that removing the monument to a more suitable place would likely increase proper attention to this “sermon in stone.” The legal precedent led many other South Carolina cities to move Confederate monuments from middle-of-the-street locations to town squares and courthouse lawns.

After some negotiation with veterans and the UDC, city fathers had the Greenville monument and statue re-erected in the newly created "Confederate Plaza" just outside Springwood Cemetery—the park having been formed by moving the cemetery fence. The monument was rededicated on June 19, 1924 along with the cannon balls and two cannons that had stood in front of the shaft on Main Street.

In 2017, protests against the Greenville monument followed violence associated with a white supremacist rally in Charlottesville, Virginia, that had ostensibly been organized to protest the removal of a Confederate statue from a Charlottesville park. Greenville Mayor Knox White proposed adding a plaque to the Greenville monument in order to provide historical context; but his suggestion never came to a vote before city council because of the difficulty in composing the text of the plaque.

In 2020, in the wake of nationwide protests against systemic racism and police brutality, opponents of the Greenville Confederate monument again demanded that the monument be relocated or removed. Mayor Knox White again noted that the South Carolina Heritage Act (2000) forbade removal of war memorials from public property without a two-thirds vote of the state legislature. On August 1, 2020, supporters and opponents held simultaneous rallies at the monument, during which the police made a few arrests.

== Monument Inscriptions ==
Erected in honor and memory of the Confederate dead of the County and City of Greenville, by the Ladies Memorial Association, September 1892.

All lost, but by the graves/ where martyred heroes rest,/ he wins the most who honor saves/Success is not the test. /The world shall yet decide/in truth's clear far off light/ that the soldiers/ who wore the grey and died/with Lee, were in the right.

Come from the four winds, O breath,/and breathe upon these slain/ that they may live./Resting at last in that glorious/ land, where the white flag/ of peace is never furled.

Nor shall your glory be forgot/while fame her record keeps,/or honor points the hallowed spot/where valor proudly sleeps./ Nor wreck, nor change, nor winter's blight/Nor time's remorseless doom,/can dim one ray of holy light/that gilds your glorious tomb.

== Additional Commemorations at Confederate Plaza ==
Created especially for the relocation of the Greenville Confederate monument in 1924, the pocket park was carved out of Springwood Cemetery at the northeast corner of the intersection of East Elford and North Main Streets. Named "Confederate Plaza" (The name "Monument Place" was initially considered), the site was improved with walkways and benches to encourage visitors to contemplate the monument's inscriptions and to provide a setting for the pair of cannons that accompanied the monument as well as "perhaps other features [that would] be added from time to time." By the 1960s, the site was also called "Monument Park" and "Confederate Memorial Park."

The site did become the site of other commemorations, most of which were originally installed elsewhere, including:

- Confederate Armory Plaque: In 1937, the Greenville Chapter of the United Daughters of the Confederacy erected a bronze tablet atop the granite cornerstone of the Confederate armory on Greene Avenue along the railway tracks. The plaque commemorated the manufacturer of weapons for the Confederacy, including a breech-loading carbine invented by George W. Morse. A later owner of the property removed the cornerstone and plaque and moved them to the back of the lot. In the 1950s, the city reinstalled the marker on a pole (without the cornerstone) at Confederate Plaza after a Greenville Piedmont reporter brought it to the attention of the UDC.
- A Tribute to the Memory of General Robert E. Lee: The Greenville and Fort Sumter Chapters of the UDC dedicated a bronze plaque marking the Dixie Highway (now US Route 25) affixed to a boulder in front of the Greenville County Courthouse in 1935. It features an image in low relief of the Confederate general atop his horse Traveler. Two thousand people attended the unveiling, where they heard Governor Olin D. Johnston compare the hardships faced by Lee and his soldiers to those faced by Americans during the Great Depression. The monument was relocated to Confederate Plaza in the early 1960s.
- Kershaw Brigade Marker: This marker recognizes a monument at Gettysburg, Pennsylvania, honoring the Kershaw Brigade, a unit of South Carolina soldiers that fought in the Battle of Gettysburg. The marker further recognizes Greenville pharmacist Albert M. Goldstine, who led the group Project Southland to erect the Gettysburg monument in 1970. In 1973, Greenville Mayor Max Heller dedicated the plaque in Confederate Plaza.
- 81st Wildcat Division: Originally erected in a small park next to Greenville's old city hall at the corner of Main and Broad Streets (now demolished), this granite monument recognizes the National Guard soldiers who trained for World War I at Camp Sevier in Greenville. In October 1956, the monument was dedicated at a Greenville reunion of the 81st Wildcat Division and was likely moved when the new city hall was built in the late 1960s.

At the city's request, in 1946, the Greenville Garden Club planted trees and shrubs to "beautify certain areas in the city" including the Monument Park.
