= Battery White =

- U.S. National Register of Historic Places
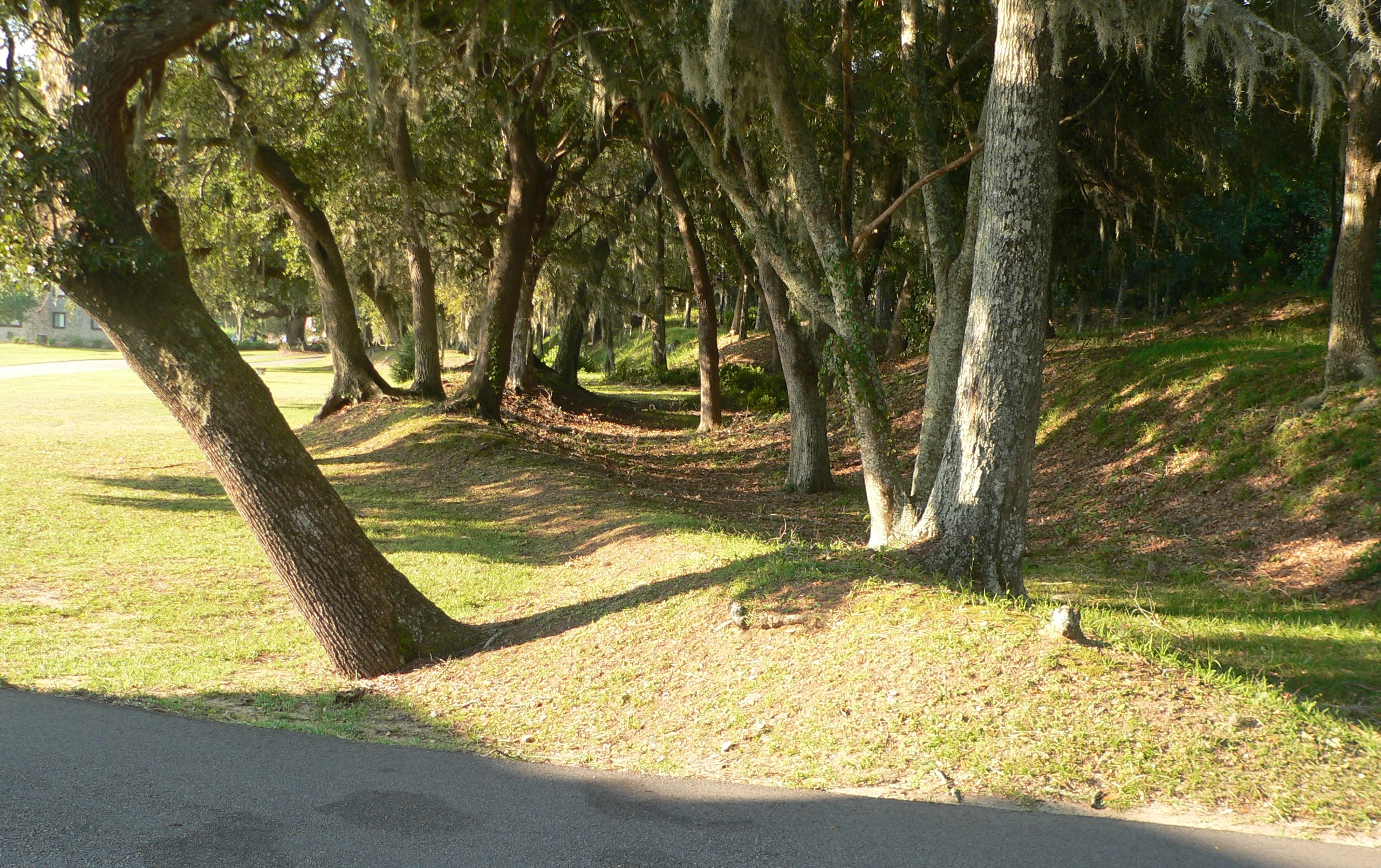
- Battery White earthworks. Winyah Bay is out of the photo to the left.

- Location within South Carolina Location within the United States
- Location: 1228 Belle Isle Road
- Nearest city: Georgetown, South Carolina
- Coordinates: 33°18′13″N 79°17′38″W
- Built: 1862
- NRHP reference No.: 77001222
- Added to NRHP: November 16, 1977

Battery White was an artillery battery constructed by the Confederates during the American Civil War. Built in 1862–63 to defend Winyah Bay on the South Carolina coast, the battery was strongly situated and constructed; however, it was inadequately manned, and was captured without resistance during the final months of the war.

The battery is listed in the National Register of Historic Places. It is located on private land, but is open to the public.

== Island fortifications ==
Even before the outbreak of the Civil War, the secessionist government of South Carolina was concerned with the possibility of attack by sea in Georgetown County. Shortly after the December 20, 1860, passage of the Ordinance of Secession, an aide-de-camp to governor Francis Pickens urged Lowcountry planters to "aid in the erection of Batteries to protect and defend the entrance of Winyah Bay and the Santee River".

The area offered a tempting target to Union forces. Winyah Bay would furnish a sheltered anchorage large enough for the entire United States Navy of 1861. The city of Georgetown on the bay was the largest on the South Carolina coast north of Charleston. Georgetown County produced nearly half of the rice grown in the United States, amounting to some 54 million pounds (24,000 tonnes) in 1860; Georgetown exported more rice than any other port in the world. This production and shipping could be disrupted by gunboats moving up the Black, the Pee Dee, the Waccamaw, and the Sampit rivers, which flow into the bay; and the two distributary channels of the Santee River, whose mouths lie just below the bay. Curtailing rice production would not only damage the local economy, but would impair the Confederacy's ability to feed its armies.

Winyah Bay, including locations of Battery White and sunken USS Harvest Moon

In May 1861, General P. G. T. Beauregard ordered the development of coastal defenses for South Carolina, including batteries situated on three islands flanking the mouth of Winyah Bay: North Island, South Island, and Cat Island. The Federal capture of Port Royal in November 1861 lent urgency to the construction and improvement of these works, which was done under Robert E. Lee, the newly appointed commander of the Department of South Carolina, Georgia, and East Florida, with Colonel Arthur Middleton Manigault in charge of the district that included Georgetown and Horry counties.

The island fortifications were never tested against a major Union attack. However, they served a useful purpose in dealing with grounded ships, both Confederate and Federal; in protecting the entrance to the bay; and in maintaining Confederate possession of the islands.

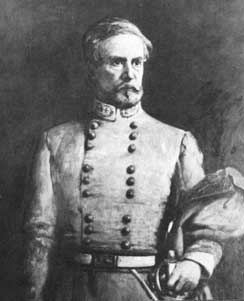
John C. Pemberton

== Withdrawal ==
Matters changed in early 1862. In March of that year, Lee was recalled to Richmond as military advisor to President Jefferson Davis. He was replaced by General John C. Pemberton, who ordered the withdrawal of troops and artillery from the positions around Georgetown, apparently in order to concentrate his limited manpower on shorter defensive lines.

Union naval forces were quick to take advantage of this new vulnerability. In May 1862, the gunboats USS Albatross and USS Norwich noted that the island forts were unoccupied. They landed troops to occupy North Island, which became the principal local Union base for much of the war; and they destroyed the fortifications on South and Cat Islands. They also sailed some 10 miles (16 km) up the Waccamaw River, where they raided a mill and carried off 80 slaves. Settled on North Island, these freed slaves formed the nucleus of a colony of "contrabands" that grew to more than a thousand before being removed to Port Royal for fear of Confederate raids leading to their recapture or massacre.

The Federal forces made no attempt to seize territory up the rivers, and their expeditions were limited by the draft of their vessels. Nevertheless, they conducted a number of raids in which they damaged facilities, seized rice, and released slaves; and these raids severely disrupted the region's economy. Rice production in particular suffered, since it depended on a labor force of skilled slaves performing carefully timed tasks.

Pemberton still refused to move artillery and men to the Georgetown area, maintaining that all of his resources were necessary for the protection of Charleston. However, his superiors ordered him to construct new fortifications at Winyah Bay. Since the Union now controlled the islands, it was necessary to find sites further up the bay. On August 3, 1862, Pemberton visited the area and selected Mayrant's Bluff and Frazier's Point as the sites for the new batteries.

== Battery White ==
Later in August 1862, Pemberton was promoted to lieutenant general and sent to the Department of Mississippi and East Louisiana, where he would eventually surrender Vicksburg. He was replaced in the Department of South Carolina and Georgia by Beauregard, who assumed command on September 24, 1862. The new commander supported the fortification of Winyah Bay: on October 8, 1862, he assured Governor Pickens that he had ordered the construction of a battery of five or six pieces of artillery at Mayrant's Bluff; on November 10, he wrote Colonel James Chesnut, Jr. that the battery was "armed and completed", and that he had sent a new regiment of the State Reserves to General James H. Trapier, in command of the Georgetown District.

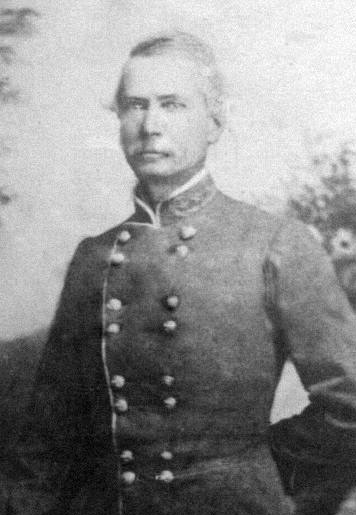
James H. Trapier

Trapier was less than pleased with the troops and artillery that he had been given. The new regiment, he noted, arrived at the battery without arms and ammunition; and as Reserves, would only be in service for 90 days, not enough time to make effective soldiers of them even had they been armed. He had also been given fairly light guns; what he wanted was Columbiads, suitable for defending the battery and the bay against incursions by ironclads.

Despite the paucity of men and weaponry, the new battery proved effective. On November 11, 1862, two Union gunboats entered Winyah Bay and began firing on the Mayrant's Bluff works. The Second South Carolina Artillery, which had set up nine guns in the fortification, responded; and within a few minutes, the Federal vessels were forced to retire.

In February 1863, Trapier reported that the Mayrant's Bluff fortification, now named Battery White, was occupied by only 53 men and nine guns. Even this small force sufficed to stop Federal incursions up the rivers of Winyah Bay. However, rice production in the Georgetown area did not recover: the raids had destroyed too much of the physical plant, carried off too many of the slaves, and created too much uncertainty for planters to return to anything near full production.

The battery continued to lose manpower, despite Trapier's ongoing calls for more troops and guns. In October 1864, a body of eleven deserters from the Confederate German Artillery reached the gunboat USS Potomska; they reported that there was great discontent among the troops, and that many would desert were they not so strongly guarded. They also reported that there were ten guns at the battery; the captain of Potomska concluded that the bay was too well defended for him to render aid to prospective deserters.

== Capture ==
In November 1864, Trapier was ordered to bring most of his forces to Mount Pleasant, just north of Charleston. Only a company of the German Artillery was left to defend the Georgetown district. By the end of January 1865, only a small crew commanded by a lieutenant remained at Battery White.

In January and early February 1865, Union forces under General William Tecumseh Sherman moved northward from Georgia into South Carolina. On February 2 and 3, they defeated a Confederate force in the Battle of Rivers' Bridge, clearing their pathway into the state. After a feint at Charleston, they marched to Columbia, which they entered on February 17; on the same day, Charleston was evacuated, and on the 18th, it was surrendered.

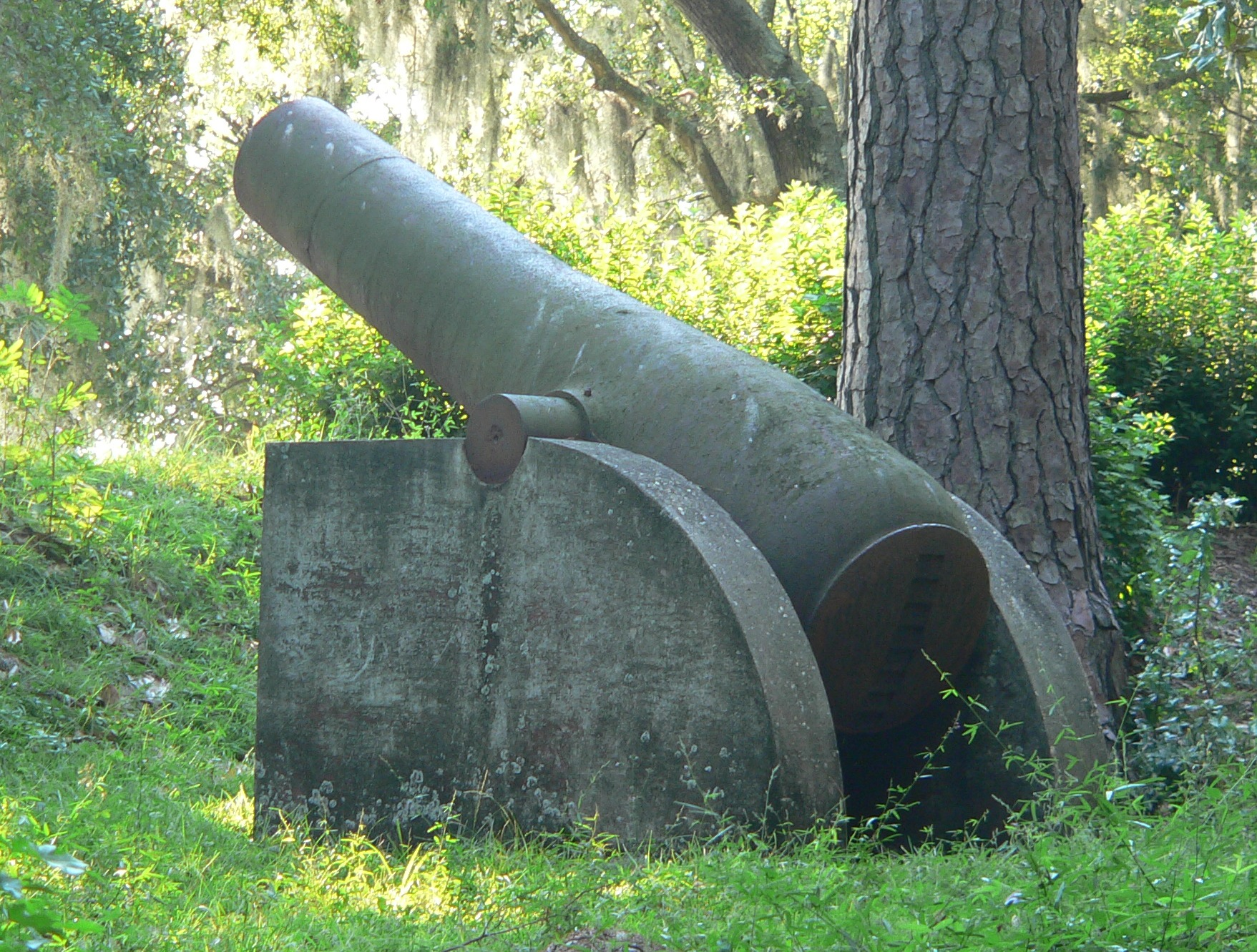
Columbiad at Battery White

From Charleston, Union naval forces under Admiral John A. Dahlgren moved up the coast to Georgetown, which Dahlgren thought might be a useful point of communication with Sherman's land forces. On February 23, deserters told the captain of the gunboat USS Mingoe that Battery White had been or would soon be evacuated. Mingoe fired four rounds into the battery. When no response was made, a party was sent ashore; they found the battery abandoned and its guns spiked. The sloop-of-war USS Pawnee and the gunboat USS Nipsic continued up the bay and landed a party of Marines to take possession of Georgetown; the intendant and wardens of the city formally surrendered it on February 25.

Soon thereafter, Dahlgren inspected the battery, and was impressed. The fortification, he wrote, was well situated and designed, laid out to defend against both shipborne bombardment and attack by landing parties. Eleven guns bore on the channel: two 10-inch (254 mm) Columbiads, three banded rifled 32-pounders, four smoothbore 24-pounders, and two banded rifled 12-pounders. A 6-pound smoothbore flanked the ditch. The rear was defended by a "formidable" rampart and ditch, with a 24-pound smoothbore at either end; in the fort were numerous traverses and magazines. The approach along the beach to the battery's right flank was covered by a 24-pound and a 12-pound smoothbore. "If the works had been sufficiently manned", wrote Dahlgren, "it would have required good troops to take the work."

=== Sinking of USS Harvest Moon ===
By the fall of 1864, the Union fleet had effectively closed Winyah Bay to blockade runners. Accordingly, the Confederate command had elected to lay mines, at the time known as "torpedoes", in the bay. Eighteen mines had been constructed in Georgetown by Captain Thomas West Daggett and Stephen W. Rouquie and placed strategically in the bay.

As early as January 1865, Union sympathizers in Georgetown had warned Dahlgren's forces about the existence of mines in the channel. While approaching Battery White, Mingoe had sent its boats out to sweep for such devices. However, their efforts may have been perfunctory: according to Dahlgren's report, "...so much has been said in ridicule of torpedoes that very little precautions are deemed necessary, and if resorted to are probably taken with less care than if due weight was attached to the existence of these mischievous things."

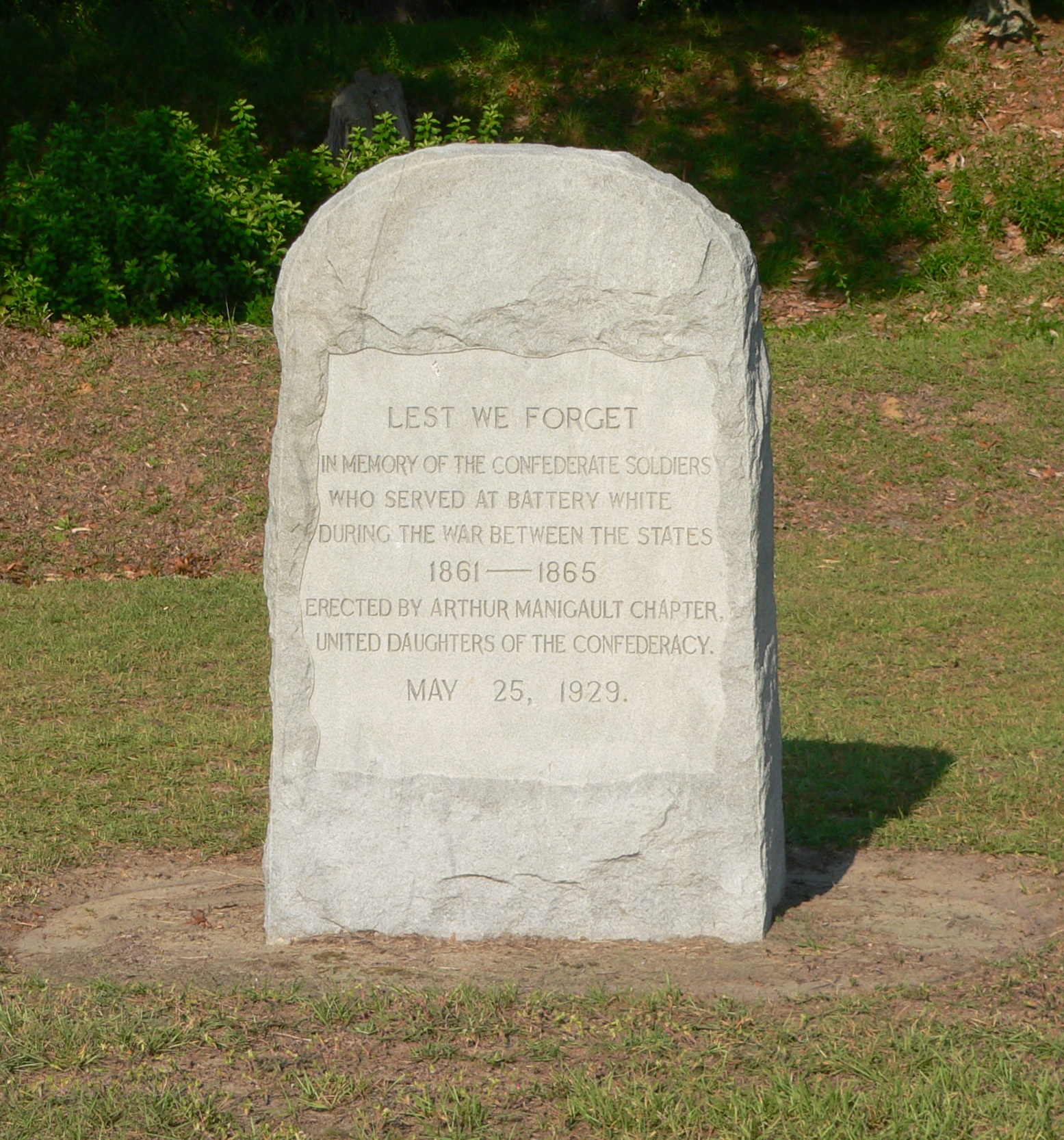
United Daughters of the Confederacy monument

On the morning of March 1, 1865, Dahlgren's flagship, the side-wheel steamer USS Harvest Moon, sailed from Georgetown toward Battery White, which Dahlgren intended to inspect. En route, the vessel struck one of Daggett and Rouquie's mines, which blew a large hole in it, killing one sailor; the boat quickly sank in two and a half fathoms of water.

== Battery White postbellum ==
For over a century after the Civil War, the grounds on which Battery White stood were part of the Belle Isle Plantation. During the late 19th century, extensive landscaping was undertaken on the plantation. The United Daughters of the Confederacy erected a memorial stone on the site in 1929. In about 1946, the plantation gardens, including the battery, were opened to the public, and remained thus until 1974.

In the 1970s, the plantation was developed as a condominium complex. Portions of the 100-acre (40 ha) complex of fortifications were lost to construction. However, the owners elected to preserve Battery White itself. In 1977, a 3-acre (1.2 ha) area encompassing the battery was nominated to the National Register of Historic Places. In 2008, the site was re-opened to the public.

The battery's earthworks are for the most part well preserved. The powder magazines have deteriorated, owing to collapse of the earth mounds following decay of their wooden interior shoring. The two Columbiads have been re-mounted and once again point out over Winyah Bay.

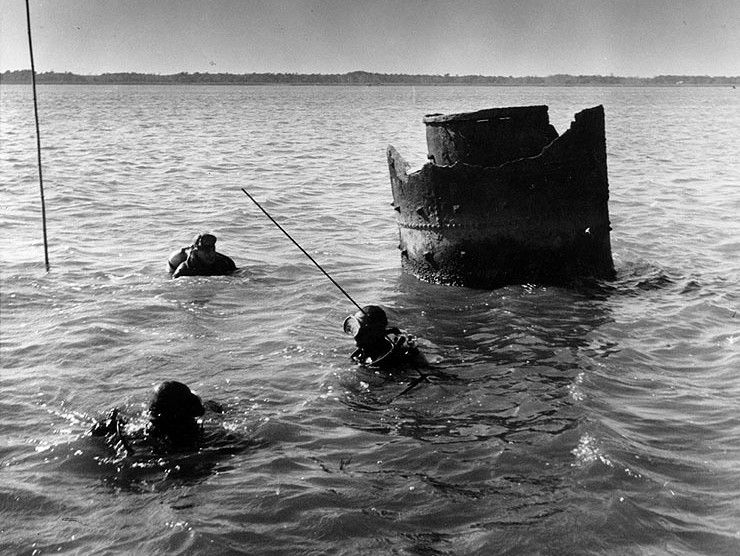
U.S. Navy divers survey Harvest Moon, 1963

Three of the battery's guns have been placed in Georgetown. A 24-pound gun has been mounted in front of the National Guard Armory, and two cannon are displayed in Constitution Park on the Georgetown waterfront.

Harvest Moon was never salvaged, and has gradually sunk deeper into the mud of the bay. In the mid-1960s, the top deck lay under an estimated six feet (1.8 m) of mud. A Georgetown group attempted to salvage and restore the vessel as a tourist attraction, and in 1964 the U.S. Navy formally abandoned it, rendering it eligible for private salvage; but the attempt failed for lack of funds. As of 2011, the ship's boiler stack was still visible at low tide.
