= Charles R. Attwood =

American physician

- Photo of Attwood taken from the back cover of his 1998 book A Vegetarian Doctor Speaks Out.
- Born: 1932
- Died: 8 September 1998 (aged 65–66)
- Occupation: Pediatrician

Charles Raymond Attwood (1932 – 8 September 1998) was an American board-certified pediatrician and vegetarianism activist who promoted a low-fat diet.

== Biography ==
Attwood was born near New Edinburg, Arkansas. He was the son of Mrs. Raymond Attwood. He received his Bachelor of Arts from Hendrix College in 1953, qualified MD from the University of Arkansas School of Medicine in 1958, and interned at Brook General Hospital in San Antonio, Texas. He served in the US Army as a pediatrician at Fort McClellan, Alabama, and completed his pediatric residence at Letterman General Hospital in San Francisco. After his army career, Attwood worked with Henry Bruin, specializing in infectious disease. He was a Fellow of the American Academy of Pediatrics.

In 1972, Attwood moved to Crowley, Louisiana, and opened a private practice. In the 1990s, Attwood was instrumental in defending some vegan parents whose children were removed by social workers from the California Department of Children's Services. Attwood wrote health articles in national and European publications, and served as a writer and consultant for Medical Economics Magazine. Along with colleagues Dean Ornish, John A. McDougall and Neal Barnard, Attwood successfully petitioned the United States Department of Agriculture to include a statement in its Guidelines for Americans that a vegetarian diet promotes health.

Attwood published Dr. Attwood’s Low-fat Prescription for Kids in 1995, in which he advocated a low-fat, plant-based diet for children and cited evidence that such a diet is necessary for children to avoid heart disease, stroke, certain cancers, and diabetes. Benjamin Spock wrote the Foreword. Attwood took a leave of absence from his practice to promote his book, and traveled over the ensuing three and a half years until his death.

In 1996, as a consultant for the Center for Science in the Public Interest, Attwood exposed the Gerber Baby Food practice of diluting fruits and vegetables with water, sugar, and modified starch. Gerber's market share dropped from 85% to 65% in the months following a national news conference on the practice. Shortly thereafter Gerber discontinued this 40-year practice, changing their labels to reflect 100% fruit and 100% vegetables.

In June 1997, Attwood was sued for malpractice by the mother of a child who died from complications of diabetes.

Attwood established and helped build the vegetarian website, VegSource.org. Benjamin Spock later hired Attwood to work as a nutritional consultant for the last revision of his own classic bestseller, Baby and Child Care, released in July 1998.

Attwood's audio series, The Gold Standard Diet: How to Live to be 100, was released nationally to bookstores in 1998. In October 1998, Hohm Press published Attwood's book, A Vegetarian Doctor Speaks Out, some of which grew out of letters from people who contacted him through his website.

== Diet ==
Attwood's recommended diet was a low-fat vegetarian diet that excluded processed foods and vegetable oils. Attwood's diet emphasized the consumption of vegetables, fruit, legumes and whole grains with the optional addition of egg whites and non-fat dairy products. Attwood argued that a low-fat vegetarian diet could reduce the risk of certain cancers, cardiovascular disease, diabetes, and stroke.

== Personal life ==
Attwood was married to his publicist, Judy B. Calmes Attwood. The couple had seven children.

Attwood died at his home in Greenville, South Carolina, at the age of 66 from complications of a malignant brain tumor. He is buried in Springwood Cemetery in Greenville.

== Selected publications ==
- Dr. Attwood's Low-Fat Prescription for Kids (1995)
- A Vegetarian Doctor Speaks Out (1998)
