= Greenville County Courthouse =

- U.S. National Register of Historic Places
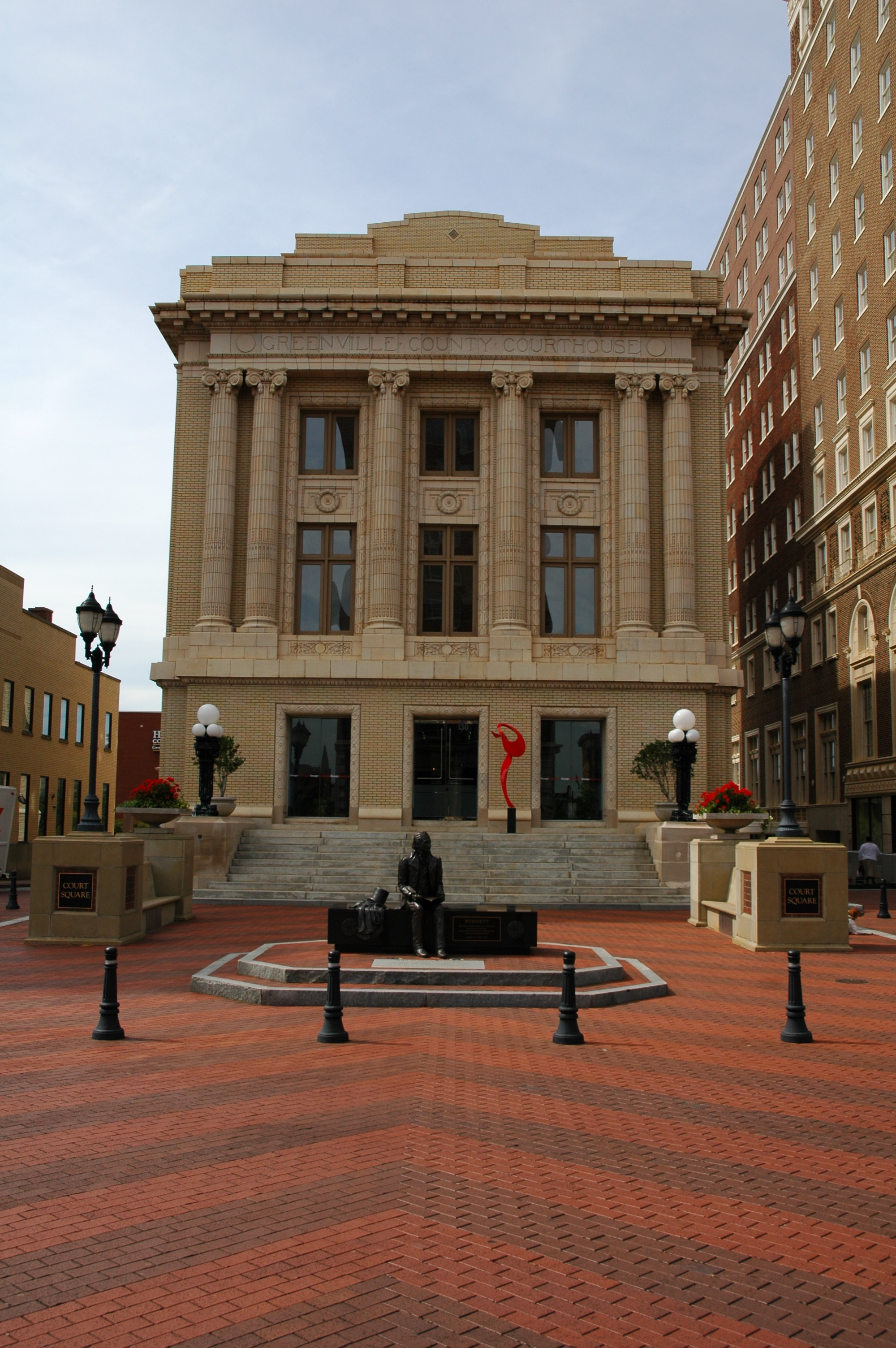
- Greenville County Courthouse, September 2008

- Location within South Carolina Location within the United States
- Location: 130 S. Main St., Greenville, South Carolina
- Coordinates: 34°50′55″N 82°24′2″W
- Area: less than one acre
- Built: 1918
- Architect: Marye, Phillip Thornton
- Architectural style: Beaux Arts
- NRHP reference No.: 94000300
- Added to NRHP: April 7, 1994

Greenville County Courthouse, also known as Greenville Family Courts Building, is a historic courthouse located at Greenville, South Carolina. It was built in 1918, and is a Beaux-Arts style brick and concrete building with terra cotta trim. The building consists of a three-story front section, with an eight-story tower behind. The building served as the courthouse for Greenville County until 1950 when the court was moved to a new building. The Family Court of Greenville County was located then in the building and remained there until 1991.

It was added to the National Register of Historic Places in 1994.

Today, the courthouse serves as the site for M. Judson Booksellers, a locally owned independent bookstore. M. Judson Booksellers was named after Mary Camilla Judson, a long-time educator at the Greenville Women's College, what is today Furman University.
