= Hampton Heights =

Historic house in South Carolina, United States

- Hampton Heights Historic District
- U.S. National Register of Historic Places
- U.S. Historic district
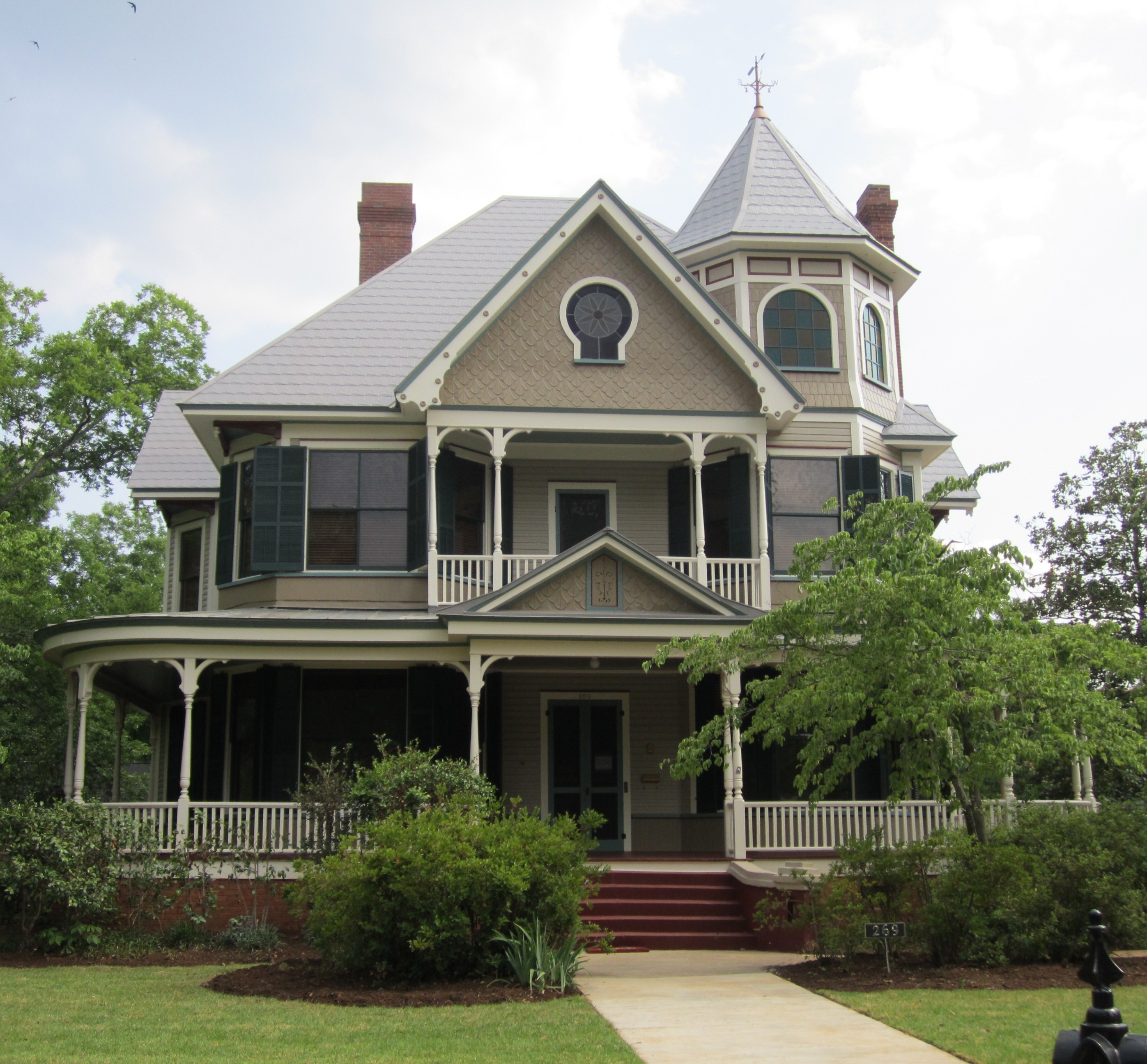
- The Irwin House is one of the oldest and grandest homes in Hampton Heights.

- Location within South Carolina Location within the United States
- Location: Roughly bounded by Spring, Henry, Hydrick, Peronneau Sts., Hampton Dr., and Hampton Ave., (both sides), Spartanburg, South Carolina
- Coordinates: 34°56′29″N 81°55′54″W
- Area: 45 acres (18 ha)
- Architectural style: Bungalow/Craftsman, Queen Anne
- NRHP reference No.: 83002208
- Added to NRHP: January 27, 1983

Hampton Heights is a neighborhood and historic district located in Spartanburg, South Carolina. Although the oldest existing home of the neighborhood dates to 1885, the majority of the homes in the neighborhood are from the 1900s to the 1930s. It is the oldest residential neighborhood in the city and one of the closest to Morgan Square, the historical center of Spartanburg. Although the neighborhood suffered from neglect and changing economics during the 1960s and 1970s, today it is a vibrant area undergoing restoration and improvement.

== History ==
During the mid to late nineteenth century, most of the neighborhood was farmland owned by the Kirby family, whose home was located at the top of a hill overlooking the city of Spartanburg, the current site of Bethel Methodist Church. During Reconstruction, the Union Army was encamped in this area.

As Spartanburg's economy grew during the 1890s, upper-middle class residents looked for homes adjacent to, but not within, the urban core. Many chose to locate along Spring Street and the newly opened Hampton Avenue, which also featured a small dairy farm owned by the Irwin family and a Methodist mission. By the turn of the century, homes were lining many of the other streets in the neighborhood, which include Hydrick Street, Lee Street, Carlisle Street, Brookwood Terrace, Hampton Drive, Perroneau Street, Irwin Avenue, Pinckney Court, Timothy Street, South Hampton Drive and Cecil Court. Architectural styles in the neighborhood include Queen Anne, Dutch Colonial, Arts and Crafts, and Colonial Revival.

== Recent developments ==
In 1983, the neighborhood was listed on the National Register of Historic Places after a campaign by several neighborhood activists. In 1998, the neighborhood was listed as a local historic district. That same year, the Preservation Trust of Spartanburg was established to increase home ownership in the neighborhood and promote its preservation.

The neighborhood also has an active neighborhood association, which coordinates home tours, picnics, clean-up days, and other activities throughout the year. Two public parks are located in the neighborhood, Willow Oaks Park and Irwin Park.

== Gallery ==
Hampton Heights Historic District

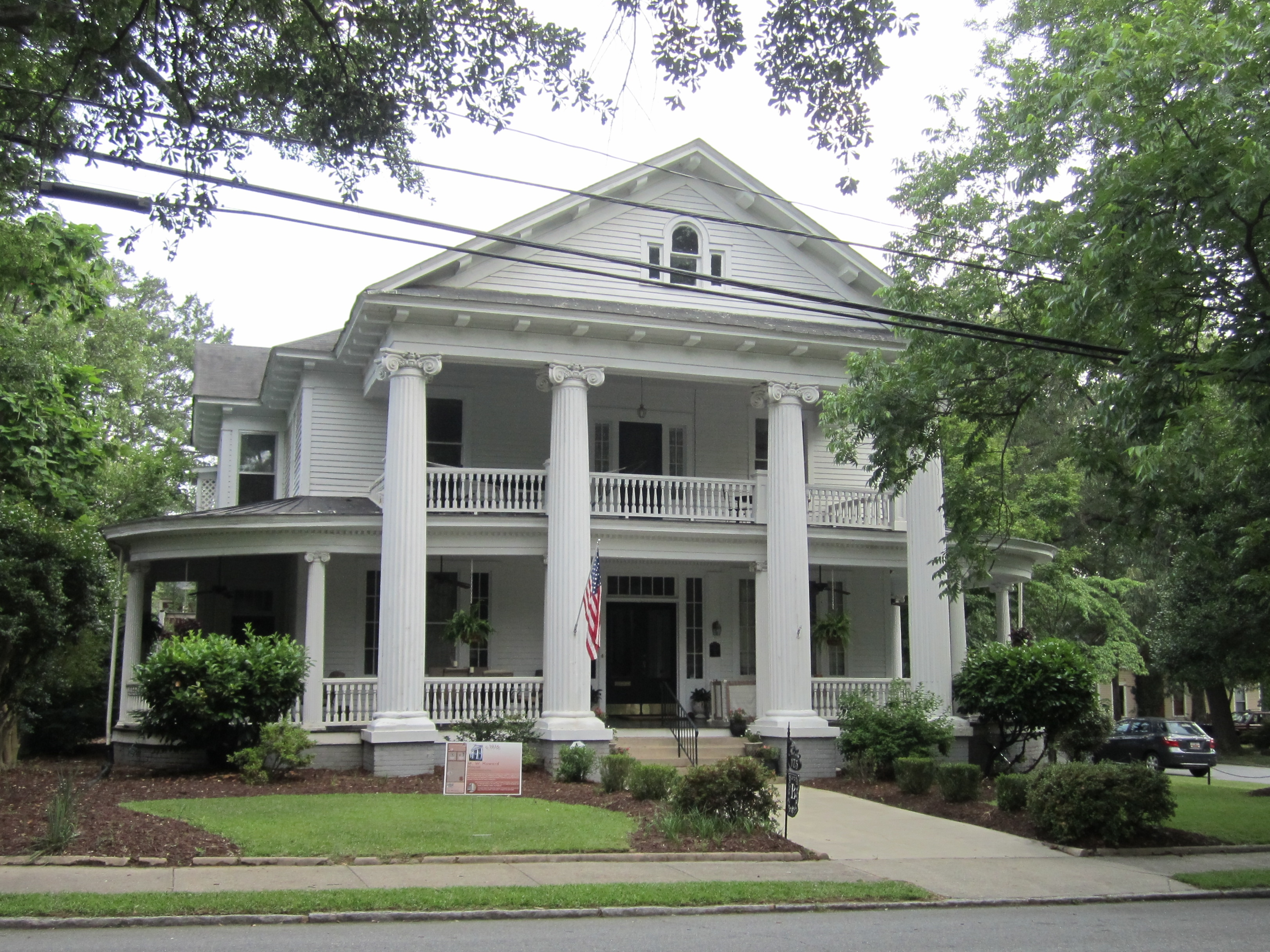
175 West Hampton Ave.

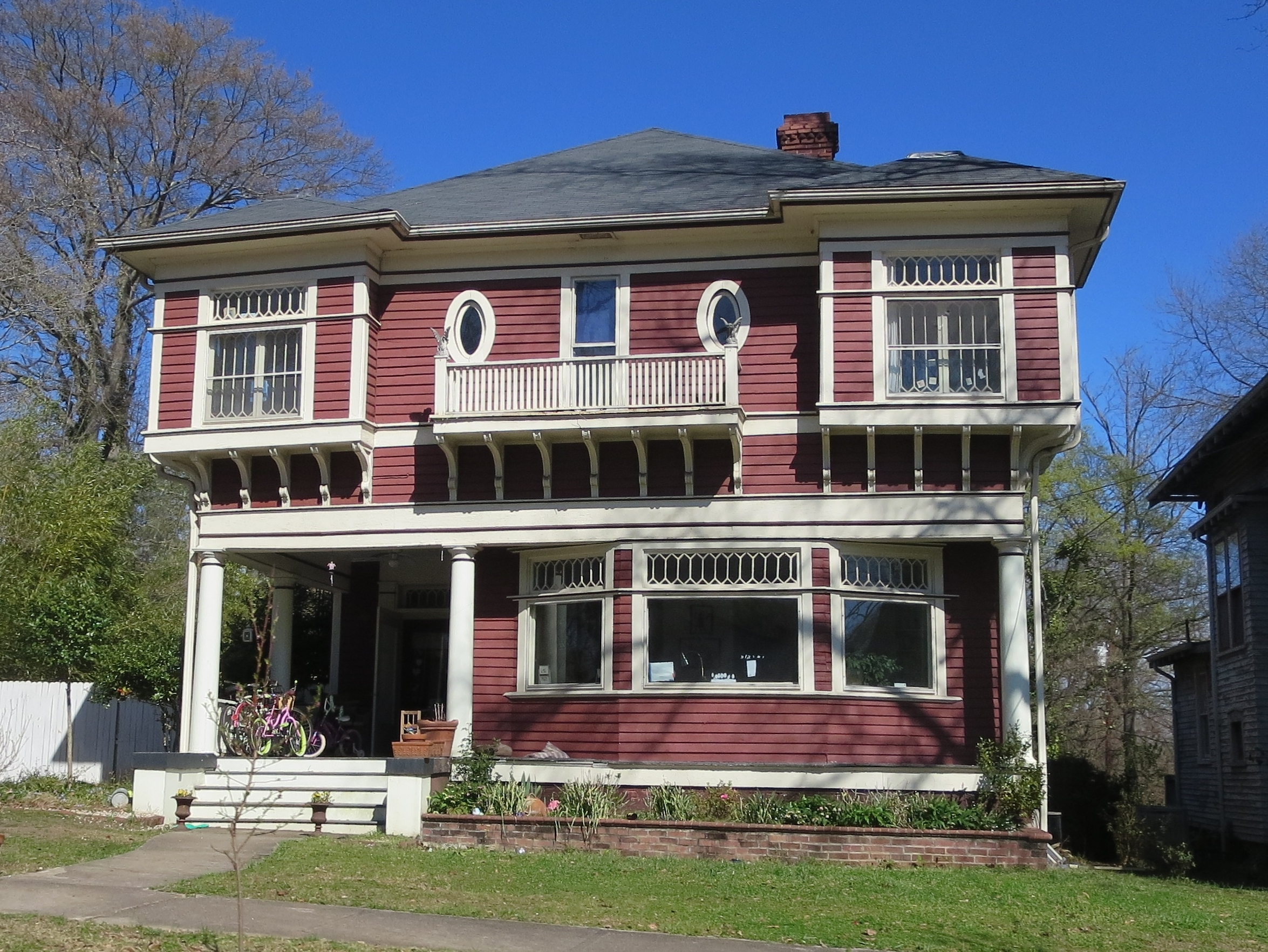
461 Hampton Drive

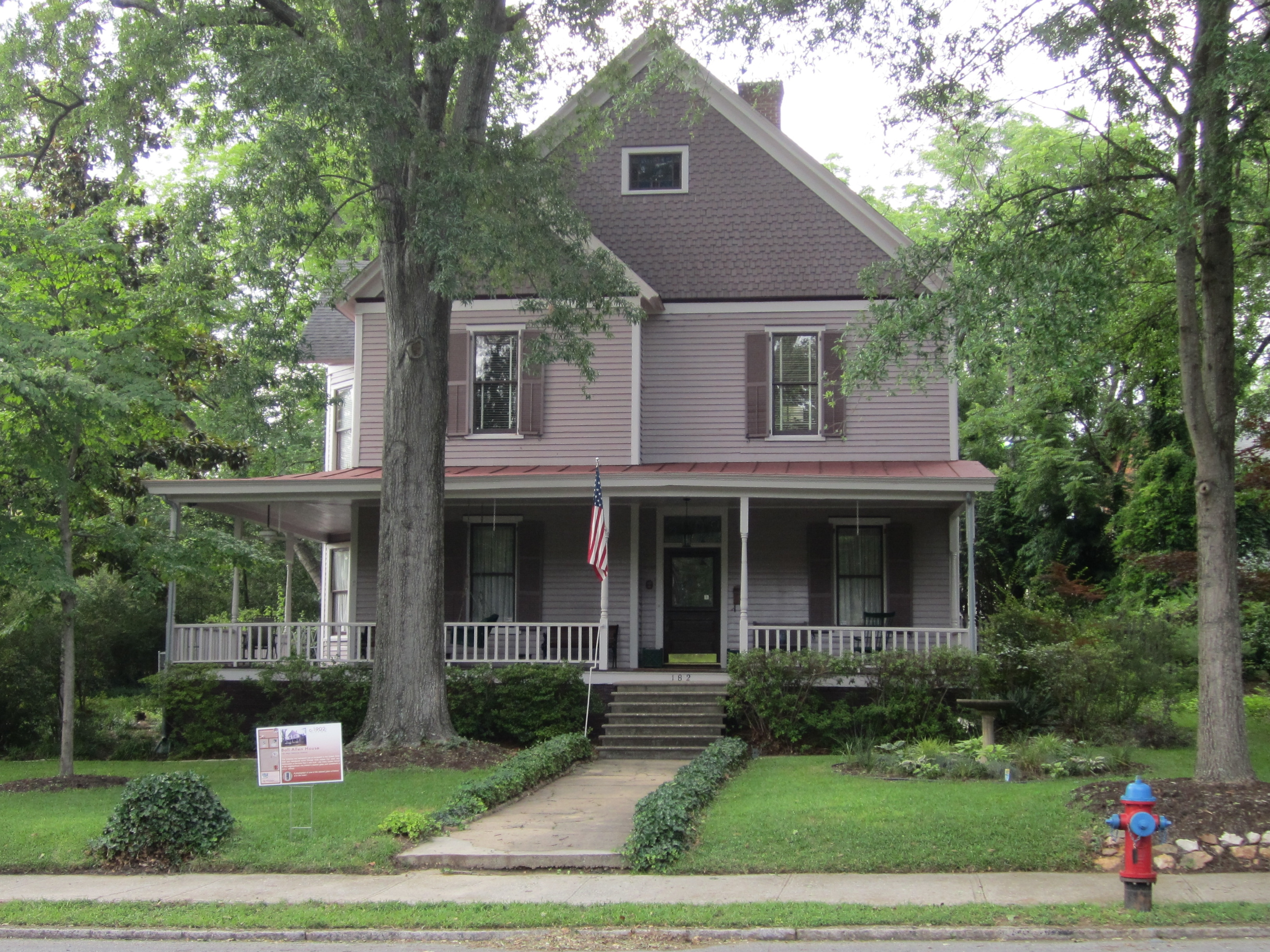
182 West Hampton Ave.

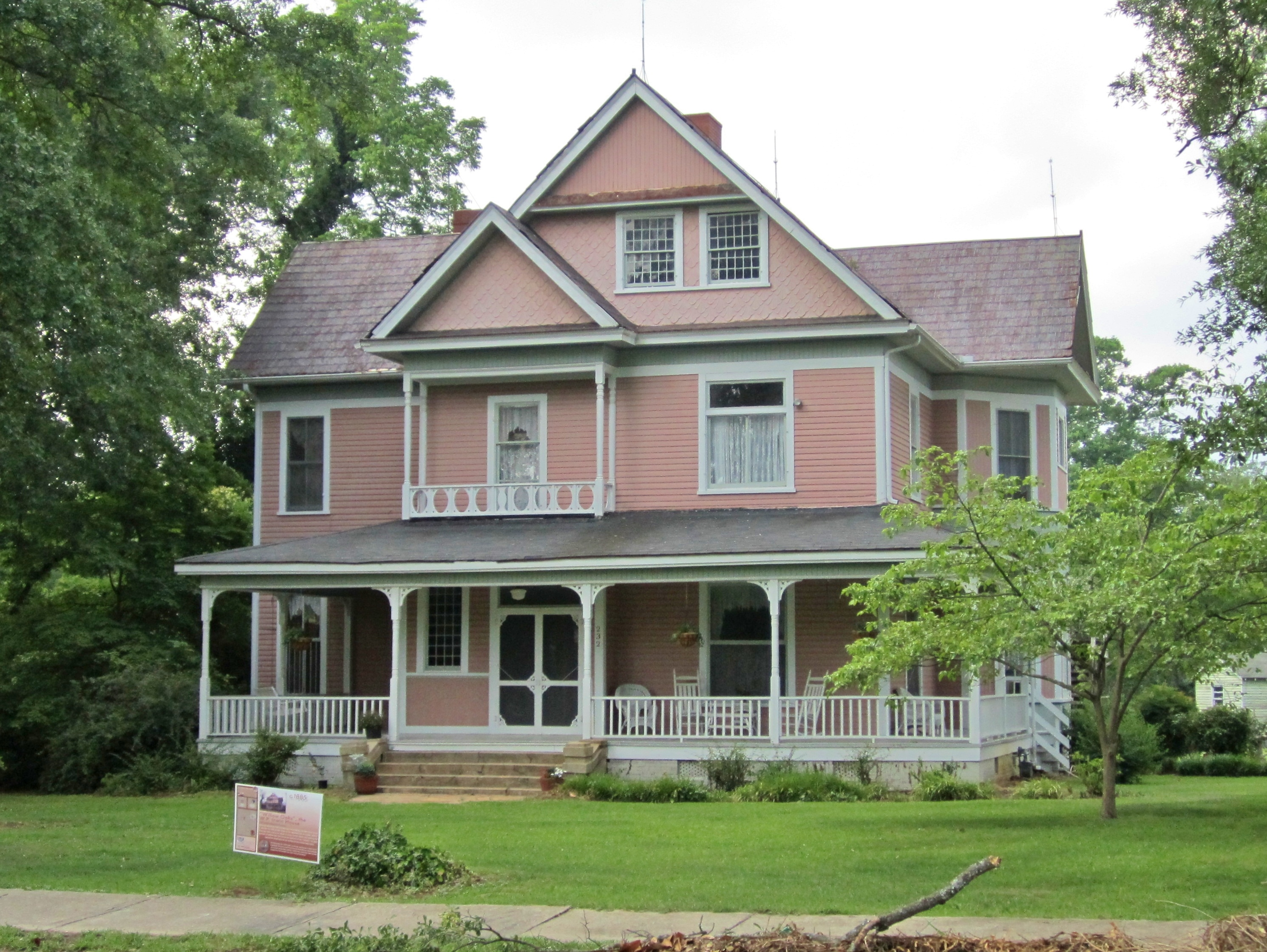
William Pinckney Irwin House

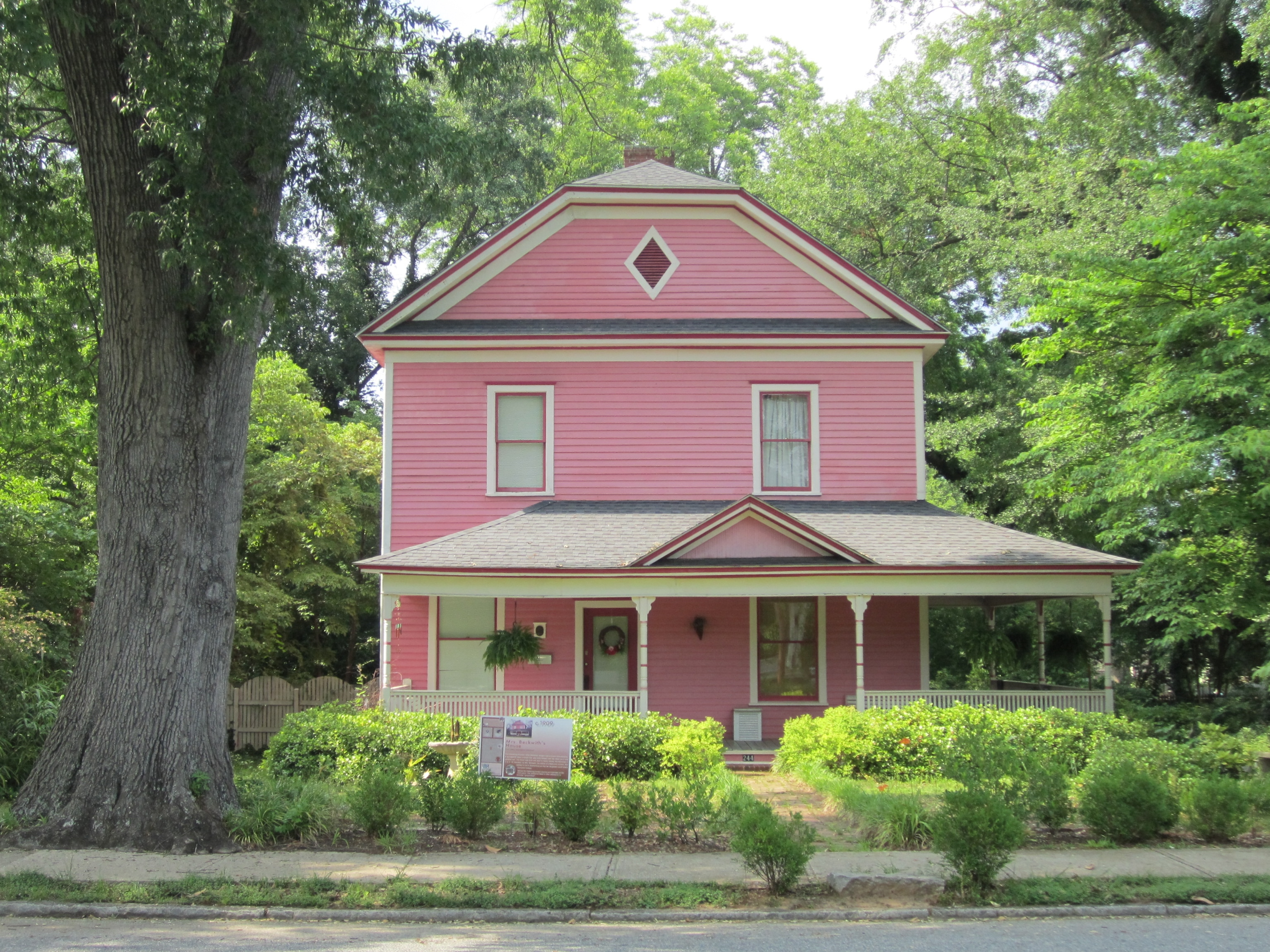
244 West Hampton Ave.

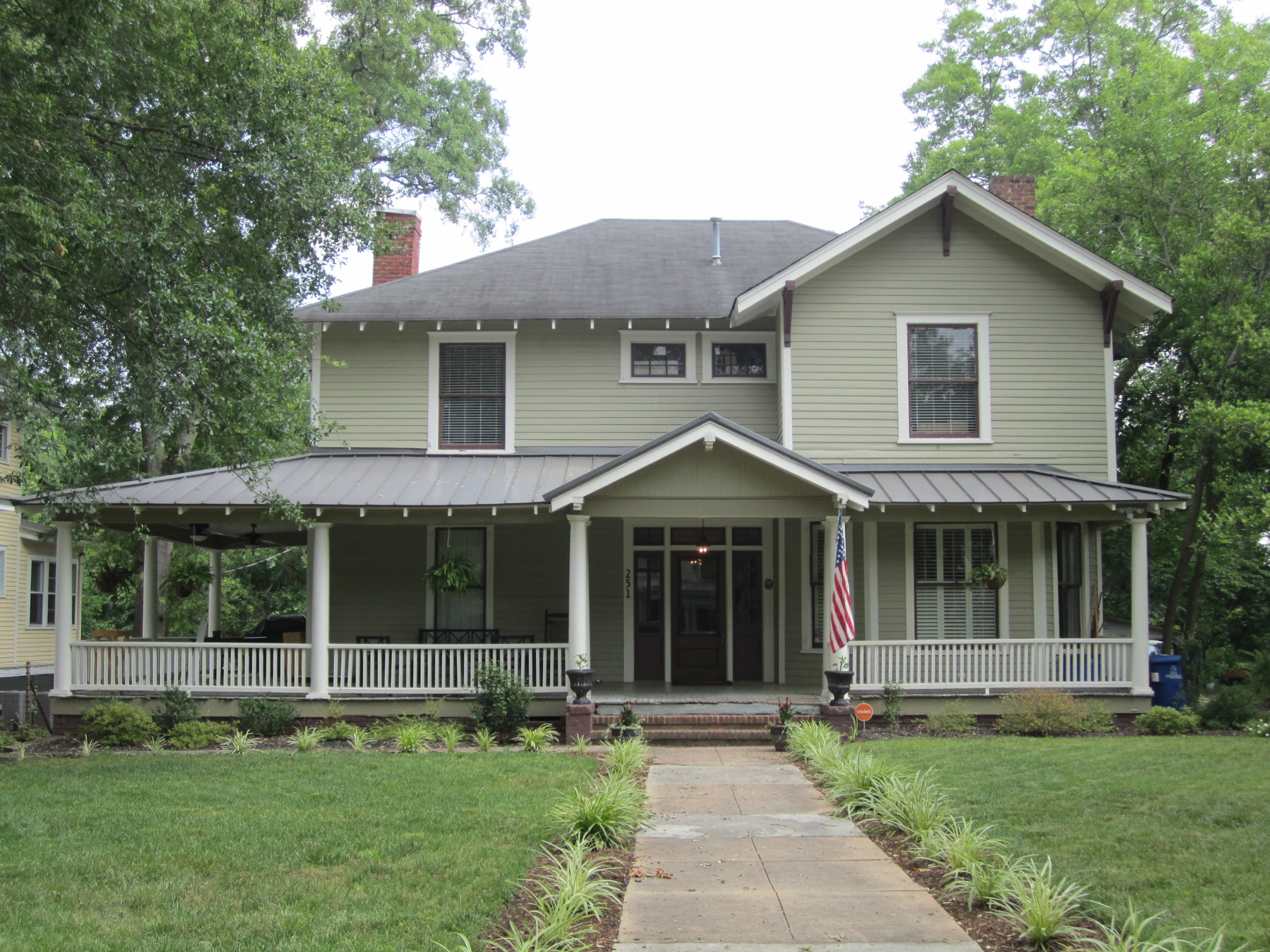
251 West Hampton Ave.

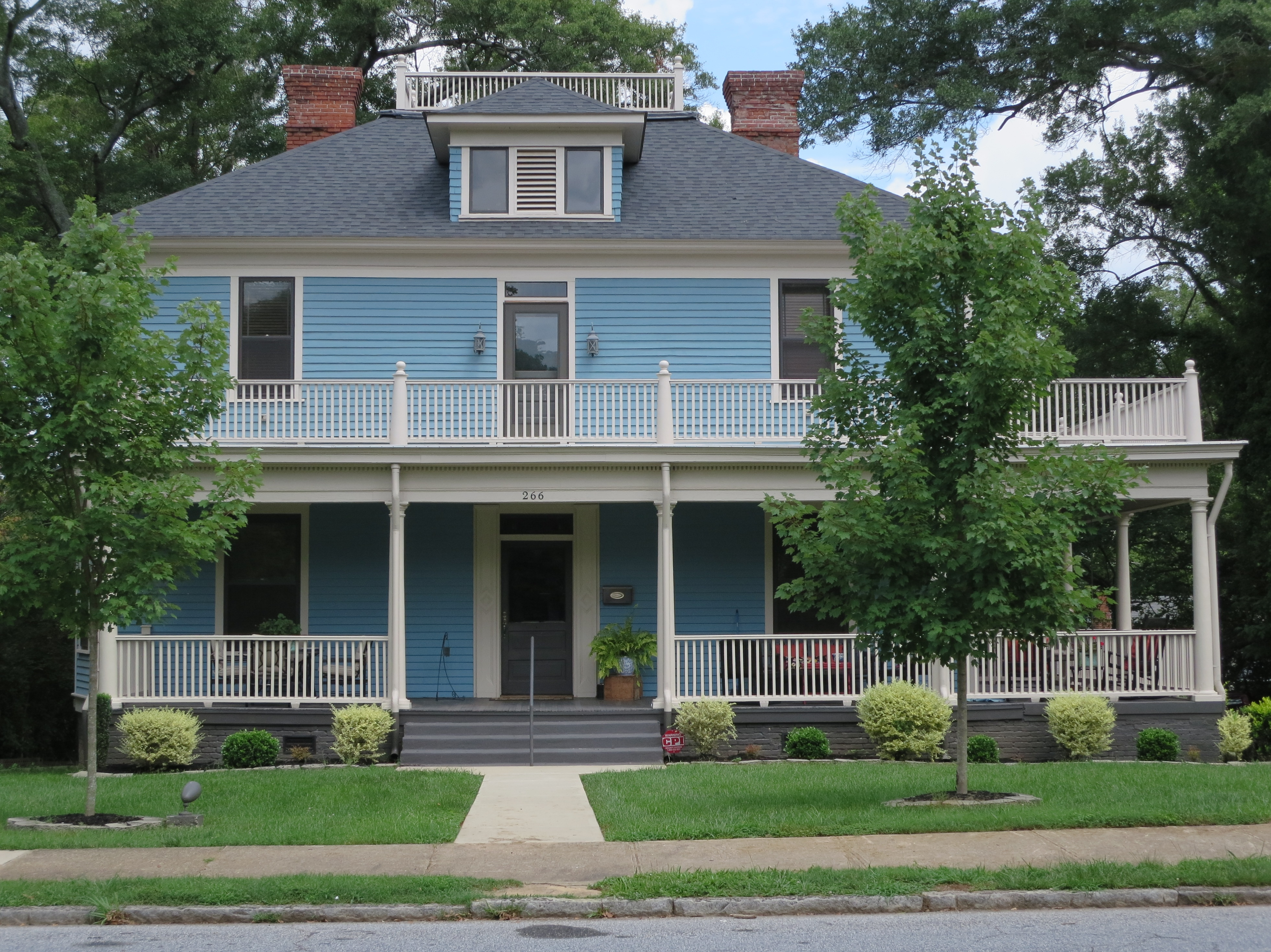
266 West Hampton Ave.

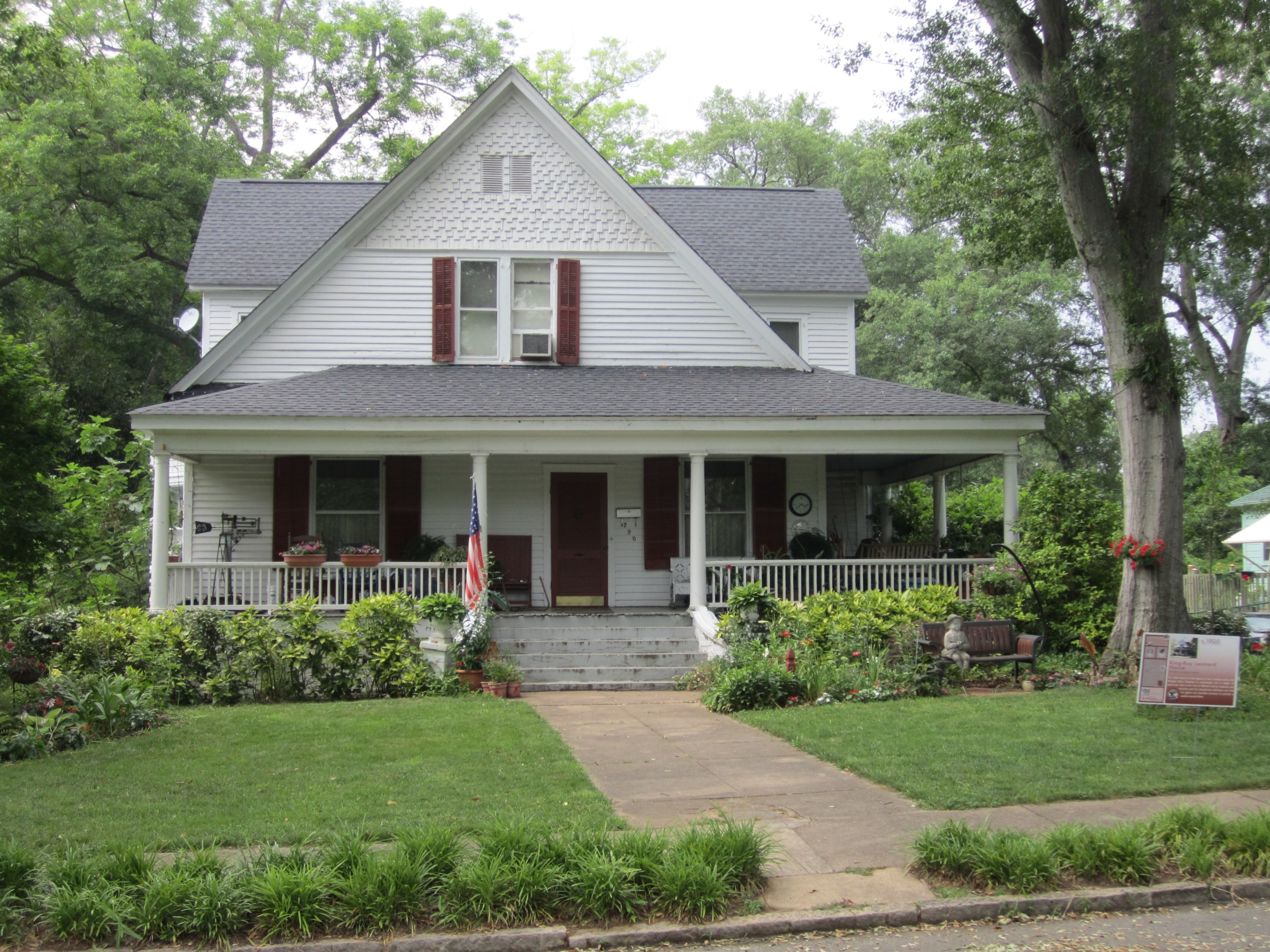
290 West Hampton Ave.

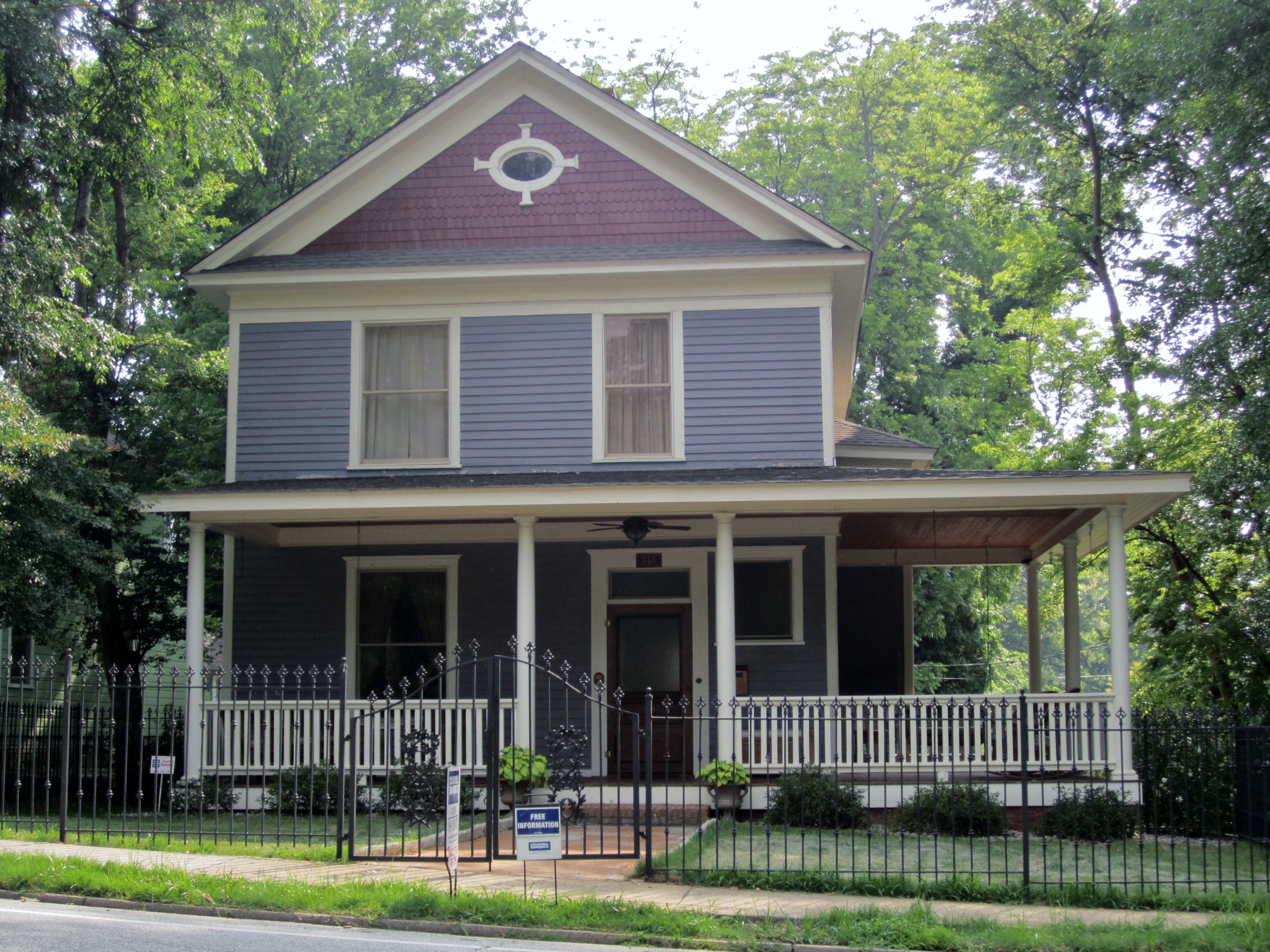
346 South Spring Street

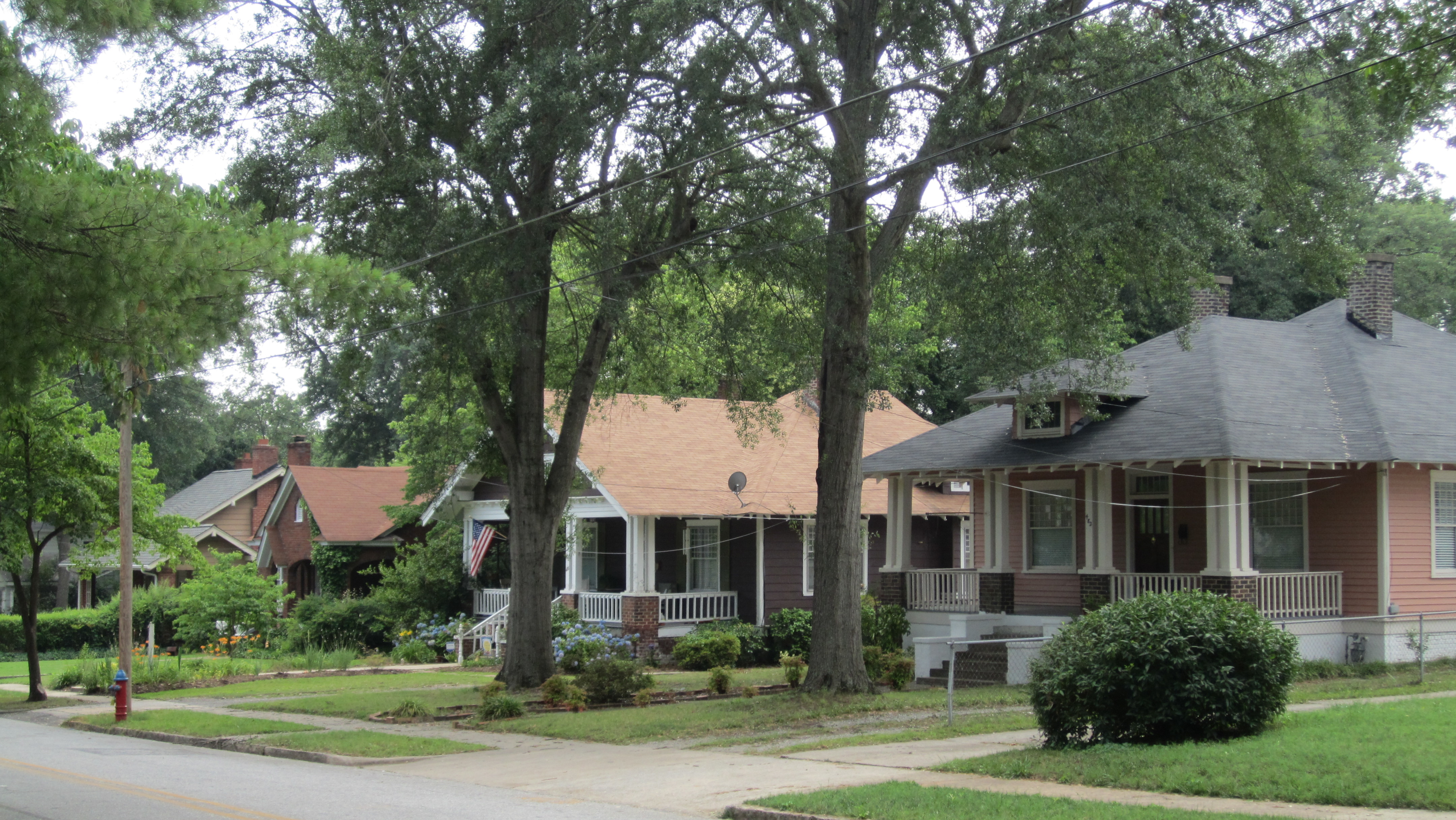
South Irwin Avenue houses
