= USS Harvest Moon =

Gunboat of the United States Navy

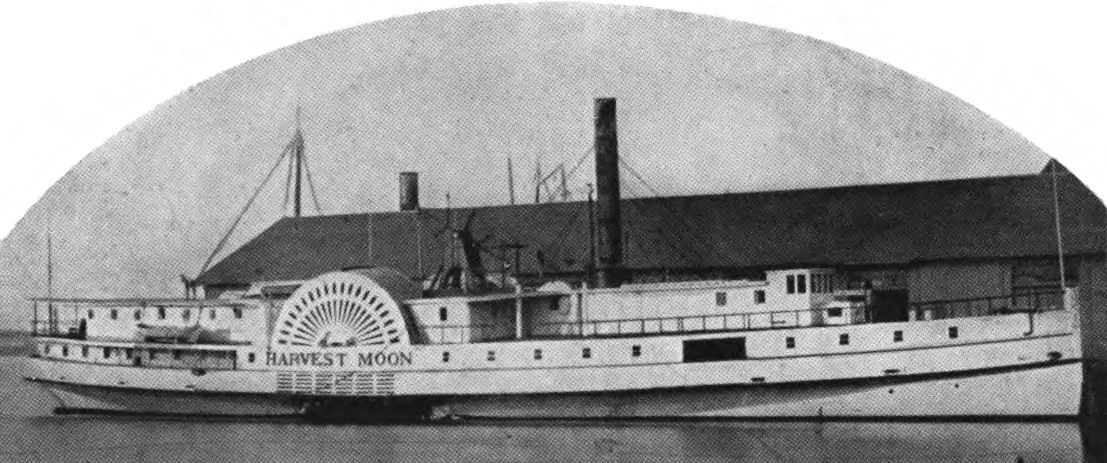
- Harvest Moon, probably before her naval service

History

United States
- Name: USS Harvest Moon
- Namesake: The full moon nearest the autumnal equinox.
- Owner: Charles Spear at Boston, Massachusetts
- Laid down: not known
- Launched: 1863 at Portland, Maine
- Completed: at the Boston Navy Yard
- Acquired: by Commodore Montgomery 16 November 1863 at Boston, Massachusetts
- Commissioned: 12 February 1864 at Boston
- Fate: Sunk 1 March 1865; Abandoned 21 April 1865

General characteristics
- Type: side-wheel paddle steamer
- Displacement: 546 tons
- Length: 193 ft (59 m)
- Beam: 29 ft (8.8 m)
- Draught: 8 ft (2.4 m)
- Propulsion: steam engine, side-wheel propelled
- Speed: 15 knots
- Complement: not known
- Armament: four 24-pounder howitzers

The USS Harvest Moon was a steam operated gunboat acquired by the Union Navy during the American Civil War. She was used by the Navy to patrol navigable waterways of the Confederacy to prevent the South from trading with other countries.

== Background ==
Harvest Moon, a side-wheel steamer, was built in 1863 at Portland, Maine, and was purchased by Commodore Montgomery from Charles Spear at Boston, Massachusetts, 16 November 1863. She was fitted out for blockade duty at Boston Navy Yard and commissioned 12 February 1864.

== Civil War Service ==
=== Operating with the South Atlantic Blockade ===
Assigned to the South Atlantic Blockading Squadron, Harvest Moon departed Boston 18 February and arrived off Charleston, South Carolina, 25 February 1864. Next day Rear Admiral John A. Dahlgren made the steamer his flagship. After putting into Washington Navy Yard for repairs. Harvest Moon began her regular blockading duties 7 June 1864 off Charleston.

For the next nine months the steamer served off Tybee Island, Georgia, the North Edisto River, and Charleston harbor. During this period she also acted as a picket and dispatch vessel as well as Admiral Dahlgren's flagship.

=== Sinking ===
While proceeding in company with the tugboat USS Clover shortly after 08:00 on 1 March 1865 Harvest Moon struck a torpedo (mine) in Winyah Bay, South Carolina. Admiral Dahlgren, awaiting breakfast in his cabin, saw the bulkhead shatter and explode toward him.

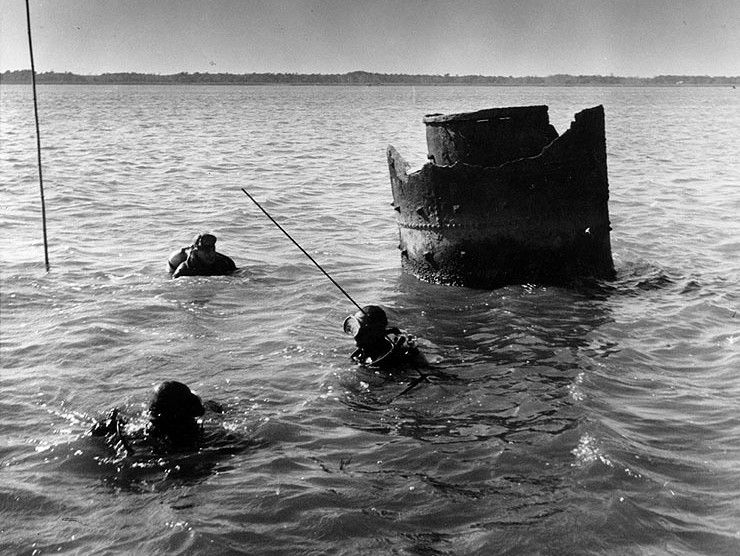
SCUBA Divers use rods to probe the area of the Harvest Moon’s wreck, circa 1963. Note the remains of her smokestack nearby.

The explosion blew a large hole in the ship's hull aft and she sank in 2½ fathoms of water. One man was killed. The admiral and the crew were taken on board USS Nipsic. Harvest Moon was stripped of her valuable machinery and abandoned 21 April 1865.

== Attempts to raise ==
In 1963, nearly 100 years later, a project was initiated to raise Harvest Moon from the mud at the bottom of Winyah Bay and to restore the ship, but has made little headway.
