= Atalaya and Brookgreen Gardens =

- U.S. National Register of Historic Places
- U.S. National Historic Landmark District
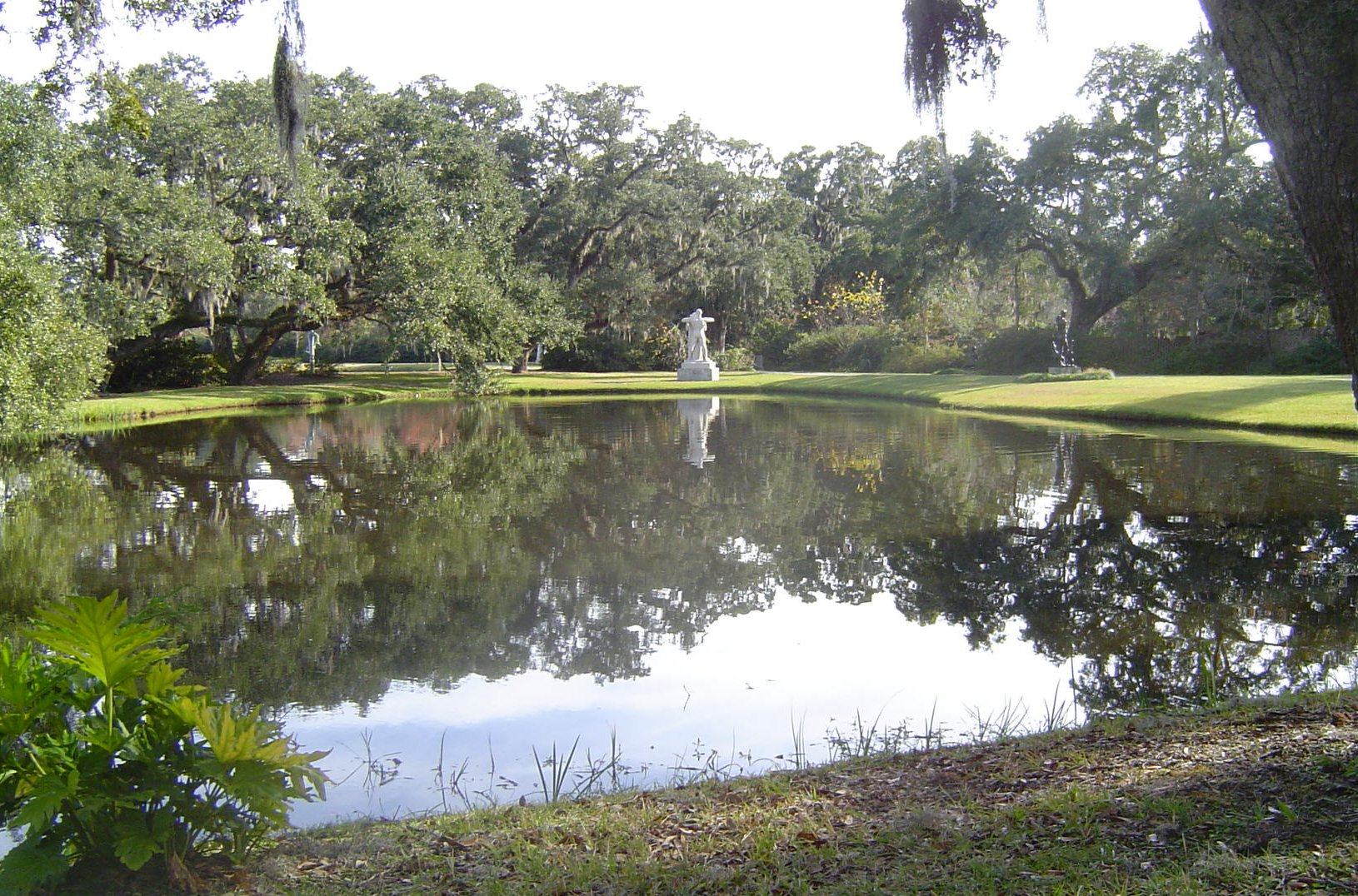
- Brookgreen Gardens

- Location within South Carolina Location within the United States
- Nearest city: Murrells Inlet, South Carolina
- Coordinates: 33°30′50″N 79°5′7″W
- Area: 551 acres (223 ha)
- Built: 1931
- Architect: Archer Milton Huntington; William Thompson; Anna Hyatt Huntington
- Architectural style: Spanish Revival
- NRHP reference No.: 84002045
- Designated NHLD: October 5, 1992

Atalaya and Brookgreen Gardens is a National Historic Landmark District encompassing two formerly-united properties associated with sculptor Anna Hyatt Huntington (1876-1973) on the coast of Georgetown County, South Carolina. The district includes Atalaya Castle, now part of Huntington Beach State Park, and the sculpture garden of Brookgreen Gardens, both properties part of a large estate developed by Anna and Archer M. Huntington in the 1930s. It includes the nation's first formal sculpture garden, and one of the studios at which Huntington did her most productive work. The district was designated a National Historic Landmark in 1992.

== Atalaya ==
Atalaya is a large Spanish Revival building, built in 1931–33, without architectural drawings, but with clear design ideas imparted by Archer Huntington, who was (among other pursuits) a scholar of Spanish arts. Its styling is reminiscent of Moorish architecture found in coastal Spain. Roughly square in shape, it has about thirty rooms, most notably a large studio space in the southeast that was one of Anna Huntington's workspaces. The property was used by the Huntingtons as their winter quarters until about 1947, and was leased by Anna to the state in 1960 for use as a state park.

== Brookgreen Gardens sculpture garden ==
Brookgreen Gardens is a large (more than 9,000-acre (3,600 ha)) nature preserve, established by the Huntingtons in 1931 as a place to showcase not just Anna's art, but that of other contemporary sculptors. The sculpture garden takes up about 550 acres (220 ha) of the property, and is the only portion included in the landmark designation. It was the first public sculpture garden established in the United States, and is probably its largest. Its permanent collection includes numerous pieces by Huntington, and contemporaries who were working between about 1890 and 1940. The buildings of the garden include a studio in which Anna Huntington worked.

== Significance ==
Atalaya and Brookgreen Gardens are the only major site reflective of the full range of Anna Hyatt Huntington's work and philanthropy. Although she had other studio spaces where she worked (notably at their summer estate in Connecticut, where the house no longer stands), those at Brookgreen and Atalaya are the only ones that survive. Anna Hyatt Huntington began selling sculptures in partnership with her sister in 1895, and had received numerous national and international awards for her work by the time she married industrialist and philanthropist Archer Huntington in 1923. Her work, mainly realistic depictions of animals, was in marked contrast to contemporary female sculptors, who tended to produce human representations. She came down with tuberculosis in the 1920s, and the South Carolina estate was developed as a natural retreat. Anna's contributions to the construction of Atalaya and Brookgreen include the fabrication of wrought iron hardware, include Brookgreen's gates. She was responsible for laying out and directing the landscaping of the sculpture garden.

== See also ==
- List of National Historic Landmarks in South Carolina
- National Register of Historic Places listings in Georgetown County, South Carolina
- Collis P. Huntington State Park, Anna Hyatt Huntington's studio in Connecticut
