= Murrells Inlet Estuary =

Estuary in South Carolina, United States

Coordinates: 33°33′14″N 79°01′19″W

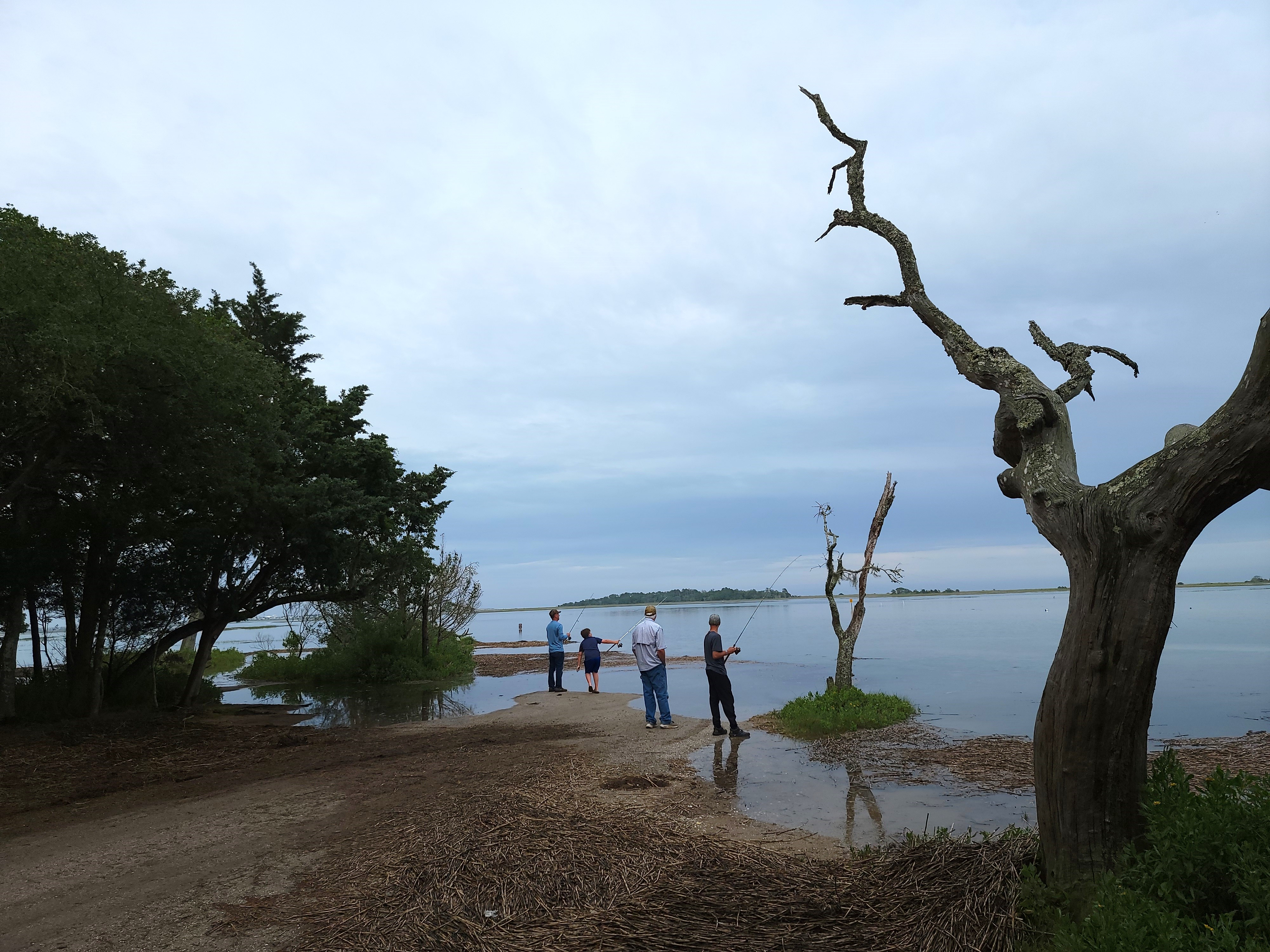
Bank fishing at the southern end of the Murrells Inlet estuary 2023

The Murrells Inlet Estuary, located on the northern coast of the U.S. state of South Carolina, is a small, high-salinity, tidally influenced estuary that contains 16.5 miles of tidal creeks. The southern boundary of the estuary is in Georgetown County at Huntington Beach State Park and its northern boundary is located in Horry County at Garden City Beach.

Murrells Inlet is a bar built or pocket estuary and stretches approximately 5 miles behind the highly developed barrier beach of the Garden City peninsula and undeveloped portion of Huntington Beach where the beach and salt marsh is more pristine. The estuary is approximately 1.5 miles at its widest point and the western boundary is the Murrells Inlet mainland. The Inlet opens to the Atlantic Ocean at the southern tip of Garden City Beach and prior to jetty construction, sandbars shifted along the opening impeding water flows in and out of the estuary.

== Features ==
The estuary itself contains over 3100 acres of shellfish beds and contains acres of high and low salt marshes and winding tidal creeks. The spartina grasses change color with the seasons and the marsh detritus that sheds each fall is part of the ecosystem.

The tide in the estuary changes every 6 hours with 2 high tides and 2 low tides during a 24 hour period. The tidal exchange in Murrells Inlet contributes to the high salinity in the estuary as freshwater inputs are limited to rainfall and sheet flows from land based sources from the Murrells Inlet Watershed.

The estuary serves as essential habitat for fish, shrimp, blue crabs, oysters, clams and has an abundance of organisms below water and in mudflats that contribute to estuary life. Murrells Inlet marine resources are managed by the South Carolina Department of Natural Resources' Marine Division.

A wide variety of species spend time in the estuary ecosystem and depend on healthy waters and salt marsh to develop and thrive. During low tide the estuary is teeming with bird life that depend on the diverse species within the tidal creek ecosystem. for survival. Several threatened and endangered bird species and marine mammals are known to inhabit the estuary. More recently manatees have been documented in the Murrells Inlet estuary and in 2017 an endangered leatherback turtle was rescued at low tide from a mud flat in the estuary.

=== Water classifications ===
Waters in the estuary are classified as shellfish harvesting waters by the state of South Carolina and are subject to the Clean Water Act. The estuary is one of 25 Shellfish Management Areas on the South Carolina coast. SCDHEC Management Area 4 is monitored for water quality in order to meet the National Shellfish Monitoring Program Requirements. Oysters are a keystone species in the Murrells Inlet estuary and an important to sustaining the overall health of the estuarine ecosystem. Intertidal oyster reefs can be found throughout the estuary.

=== Threatened and endangered species ===
The Murrells Inlet is an essential fish habitat and nursery for many marine species including threatened and endangered species that spend time in the salt marsh and nearshore beach areas. Threatened and endangered bird species include the wood stork, red knot, piping plover, and black rail. Huntington Beach State Park at the southern end of the estuary is known as one of the best birding areas in the southeast.

Marine species that are threatened and endangered include the West Indian manatee. Threatened and endangered species that are found and often nest in the area include the sea turtle species: green sea turtle, Kemp's ridley sea turtle, leatherback sea turtle, and loggerhead sea turtle.

=== Anthropogenic change ===
Anthropogenic changes from rapid development are impacting coastal estuaries across the globe. Changing climate conditions can have major impacts on estuaries and the species that inhabit the ecosystem. Land development is the leading cause of degradation in the coastal zone

In 1971 the Murrells Inlet Jetty Project was authorized by Congress and the jetty project was completed by the US Army Corps of Engineers in 1980 resulting in changes to tidal flushing in the estuary along with growth of sand beach on the tip of Garden City. The project was monitored to determine ecological impacts both prior to and after the jetties were installed. Many species are found near and on the jetty rocks.

Maintenance dredging is an ongoing issue in the federal channel and more recently in tidal creeks that have historically been subject to limited water at time of low tide. Dredging can alter the hydrology of estuarine systems as these systems are in a constant state of flux due to tidal influences and human alteration. Human activities including increasing boat wakes can cause excess erosion and sedimentation that can smother oyster reefs.

The salt marshes in the Murrells Inlet estuary are among the most imperiled in the state of South Carolina to sea level rise. Currently king tides impact the salt marshes of the estuary and will be a growing issue in the coming decades as sea level continues to rise. If the marsh is unable to migrate upward and collect sediments to keep it up with rising seas, the marsh will drown. Marsh migration can occur in areas where the marsh has room to move upslope.

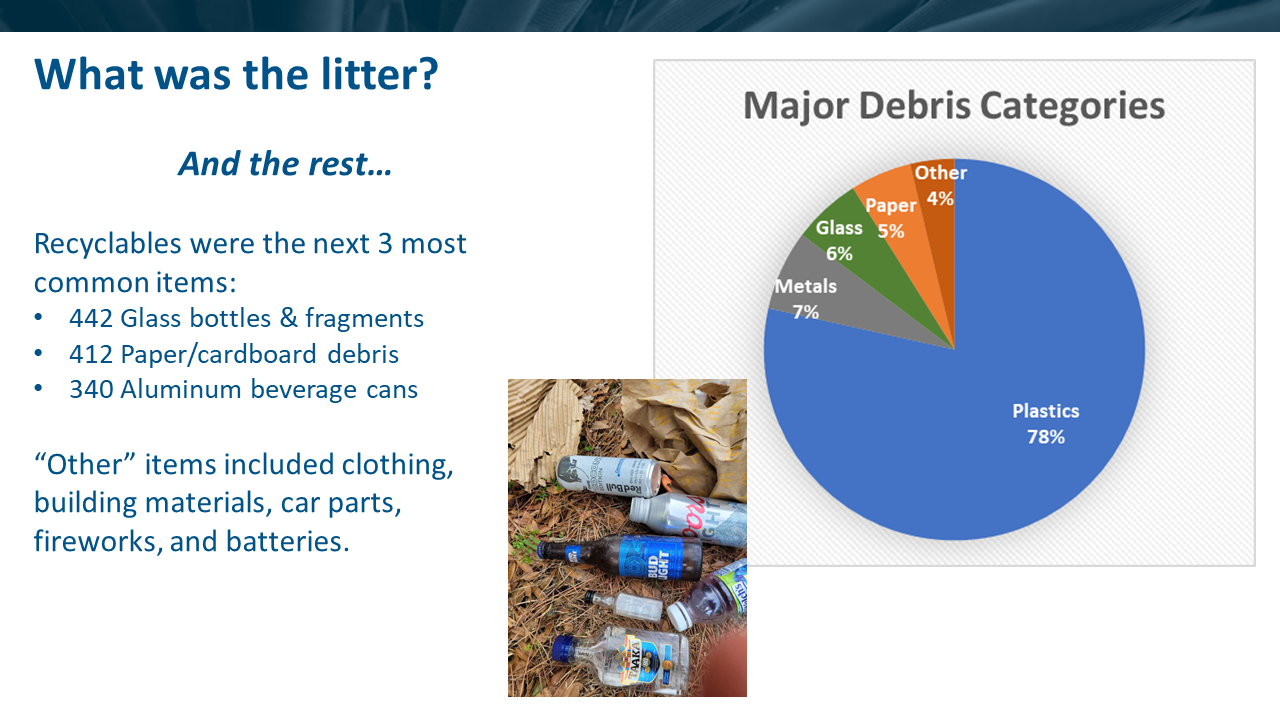
Murrells Inlet litter data

=== Plastic pollution ===
Plastics are impacting oceans and marine ecosystems around the globe. In 2022 a citizen science data collection project in Murrells Inlet at four sites at the edge of the marsh showed 78% of litter collected contained plastics. Sediment studies show microplastics have accumulated in salt marshes as a result of increased development and urbanization.

=== Impacts of stormwater runoff ===
Stormwater runoff is a major concern for the health and integrity of the United States' waters. The Murrells Inlet Estuary has sites on 303d list for bacteria impairments and a total maximum daily load (TMDL) was approved in 2005. The Murrells Inlet Watershed Plan was completed in 2014, with the help of local stakeholders and resource managers, to improve water quality and protect local oyster harvests. A 2022 audit of the SMS4 program by the SC Department of Health and Environmental Control found that Georgetown County had failed to implement the watershed plan.
