= Dream Lady =

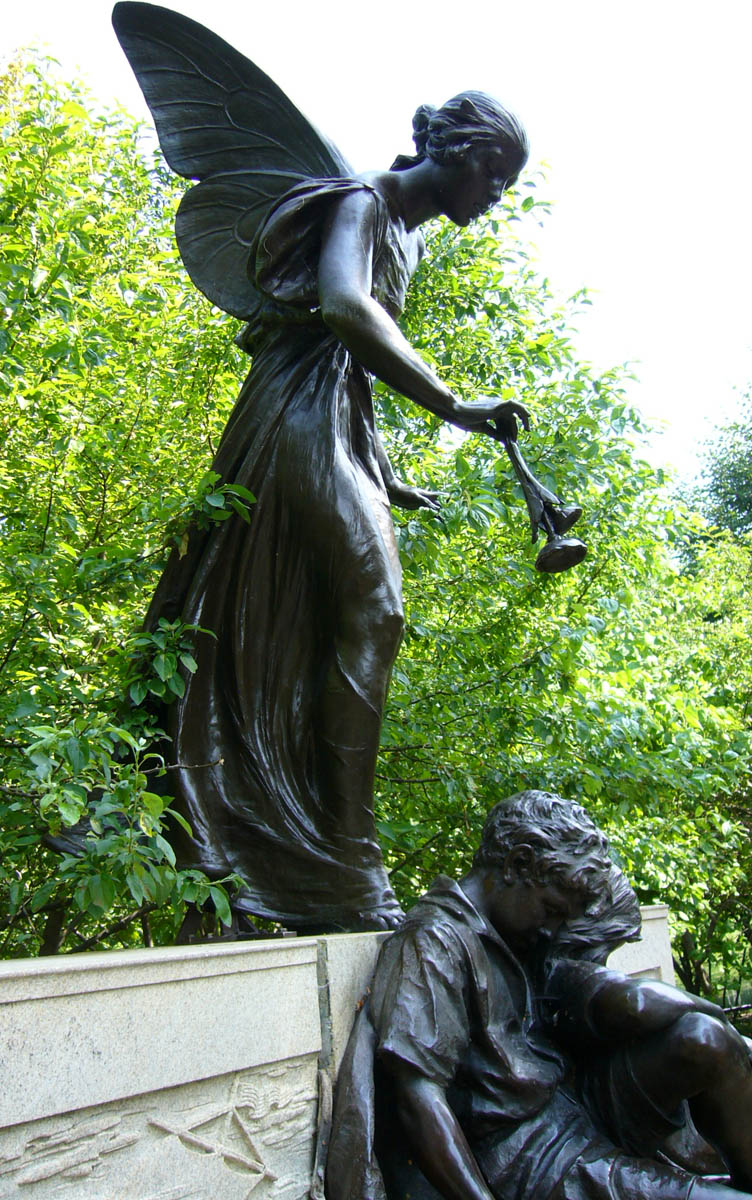

- Location in Chicago
- Artist: Edward McCartan
- Year: 1922
- Type: Bronze
- Location: Chicago, Illinois, United States; 41°55′16.23″N 87°37′56.03″W

Dream Lady, also known as the Eugene Field Memorial, is a bronze sculpture by Edward McCartan. It is located in Lincoln Park, Chicago.

Eugene Field (1850–1895) was an author and journalist, and wrote a humor column, "Sharps and Flats", for the Chicago Daily News. He was also well known as an author of poems for children.

== History ==
The memorial cost $35,000, and was funded by public school children, citizens of Chicago and the B. F. Ferguson Monument Fund. It was dedicated on October 9, 1922.

The inscriptions reads:

- On upper base front left side:

Have you ever heard of the sugar plum tree
tis a marvel of great renown
it blooms on the shore of the lollipop sea
in the garden of shut eye town.

- On upper base front right side:

Wynken, Blinken and Nod one night
sailed off in a wooden shoe
sailed on a river of crystal light
into a sea of dew.

- On back of base:

Erected in 1922 by
school children and
citizens aided by the
Benj. F. Ferguson Fund

== See also ==
- List of public art in Chicago
