= Richmond Hill Plantation Archeological Sites =

Archaeological site in South Carolina, United States

- U.S. National Register of Historic Places
- Nearest city: Murrells Inlet, South Carolina
- Area: 136.3 acres (55.2 ha)
- MPS: Georgetown County Rice Culture MPS
- NRHP reference No.: 88000537
- Added to NRHP: October 6, 1988

Richmond Hill Plantation Archeological Sites consists of five historic archaeological sites located near Murrells Inlet, Georgetown County, South Carolina. The Richmond Hill Plantation complex sites include remains of the planter's house, two possible overseers' houses, approximately 20 slave houses, a slave cemetery, a rice barn, and rice fields and dikes. The plantation house, overseers' houses, and slave houses were all burned by about 1930. Richmond Hill plantation was owned by Dr. John D. Magill, who was considered one of the least efficient planters in the area and the most brutal slaveowner among the Georgetown District rice planters.

It was listed on the National Register of Historic Places in 1988.
