= Sandy Island, South Carolina =

Coordinates: 33°33′28″N 79°7′51″W

- Unincorporated Community
- Interactive map of Sandy Island, South Carolina
- Country: United States
- State: South Carolina
- County: Georgetown
- Time zone: Eastern
- Area code: 843

Sandy Island is the name of a small unincorporated community in Georgetown County, South Carolina, United States, and a larger island between the Pee Dee and Waccamaw Rivers that has been preserved as a refuge and nature center.

The island is about 9,000 acres (36 km^{2}) of a prehistoric sand dune. It is bounded east and west by the rivers, on the north by Bull Creek, and on the south by Thoroughfare Creek.

The northern part of the island is higher and is mostly a longleaf pine forest, which provides a refuge for the endangered red-cockaded woodpecker and American peregrine falcon, along with numerous other species of plants and animals. About 9,000 acres (36 km^{2}) of the island has been purchased by The Nature Conservancy for permanent protection from development.

On the southern, lower end of the island are the remnants of old rice plantations, with the watergates and earthwork canals, built by African enslaved people who were forced to grow rice there. Such development was used to manage the water supply for irrigating the rice fields. A small community in the south is made up of a few families who are descendants of former slaves. The island is only accessible by boat, and workers and school children commute to the mainland daily for work and school.

Because of its resources, the island is regularly visited by naturalists, planters, archaeologists and geologists. Brookgreen Gardens runs daily "scenic" boat rides close to the island. Tours of the southern end are available by private tour company.
