= Atalaya Castle (US) =

Historic house in South Carolina, United States

- Atalaya
- U.S. National Register of Historic Places
- U.S. National Historic Landmark District – Contributing property
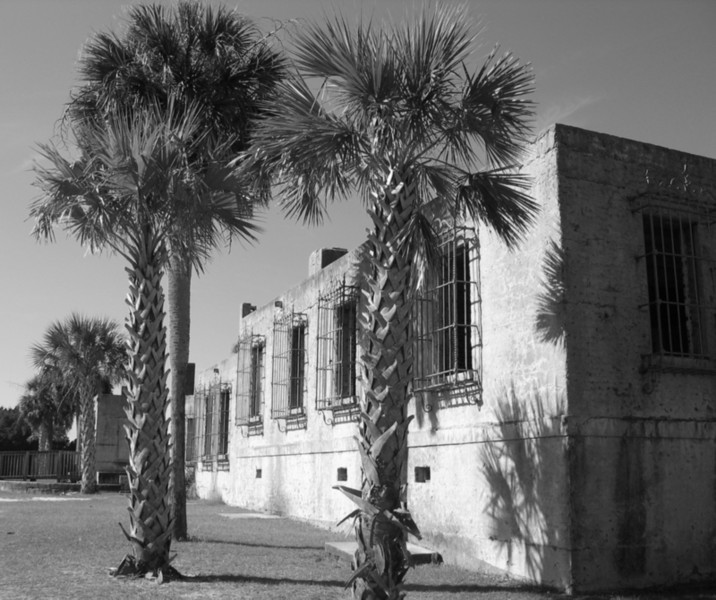
- Ocean side view of the 'Atalaya Castle' facade.
- Nearest city: Murrells Inlet, South Carolina
- Coordinates: 33°30′6″N 79°4′3″W
- Built: 1931
- Architect: Archer Milton Huntington; William Thompson
- Part of: Atalaya and Brookgreen Gardens (ID84002045)
- NRHP reference No.: 84002045

Significant dates
- Added to NRHP: September 7, 1984
- Designated NHLDCP: October 5, 1992

Atalaya Castle, often known simply as Atalaya, was the winter home of industrialist and philanthropist Archer M. Huntington and his wife, the sculptor Anna Hyatt Huntington, located in Huntington Beach State Park near the Atlantic coast in Murrells Inlet, Georgetown County, South Carolina.

Archer Huntington was a noted scholar of Moroccan culture and art, and designed the residence in the Moorish Revival and Mediterranean Revival architecture styles from Moroccan Andalusian coast models.

== Residence ==
Atalaya was built near the Atlantic Ocean in northeastern South Carolina, within present day Huntington Beach State Park. The location was chosen as a milder winter retreat for the health of Anna Huntington, who suffered from tuberculosis from the mid-twenties to the mid-thirties.

The 200-by-200-foot (61 m × 61 m) masonry structure was built from 1931 to 1933 apparently without drawn plans, Archer Huntington had already designed the residence for them with his detailed imagination 'in his head.' Local labor was used at Archer Huntington's insistence to provide work for a community hard hit by the Great Depression.

=== Description ===
Atalaya (ah-tuh-LIE-yuh) means "watchtower" in Spanish, as in the real Atalaya Castle in Spain. The house is dominated by a square tower, which housed a 3,000-US-gallon (11,000 L) water tank. Rising nearly 40 feet (12 m) from a covered walkway, it bisects Atalaya's inner court. The inner walls of the main courtyard were covered with creeping fig vines, Sabal palmettos, the South Carolina state tree, and other palms.

The living quarters consist of 30 rooms around three sides of the perimeter, while the studio, with its 25-foot (7.6 m) skylight, opens onto a small, enclosed courtyard where Anna Hyatt Huntington worked on her sculptures. Pens for animal models, including horses, dogs and bears, are situated adjacent to the open studio. The building also features hand-wrought iron grills designed by Mrs. Huntington, which cover the exteriors of windows. These and shutters were installed for protection against hurricane winds.

==== Transition ====
During World War II the Huntingtons vacated Atalaya and provided it to the Army Air Corps for use from 1942 to 1946.

The Huntingtons last used Atalaya as their winter home in 1947. Most of the furnishings were sent to New York City after Mr. Huntington's death in 1955. The studio equipment was moved to a new studio at Brookgreen Gardens just across U.S. Route 17, which cut through the Huntingtons' former contiguous property.

== Public era ==
The 2,500-acre (1,000 ha) tract was leased to the state in 1960 for use as a state park. Mrs. Huntington died in 1973.

Atalaya Castle was listed on the National Register of Historic Places in 1984, and was included in the designation of Atalaya and Brookgreen Gardens (along with the sculpture garden at Brookgreen Gardens) as a National Historic Landmark District in 1992.

The Friends of Huntington Beach State Park offer guided tours of Atalaya and operate the Atalaya Visitor Center with exhibits about the house and the Huntingtons.

The annual Atalaya Arts and Crafts Festival is held each year in late September.

== Photos ==
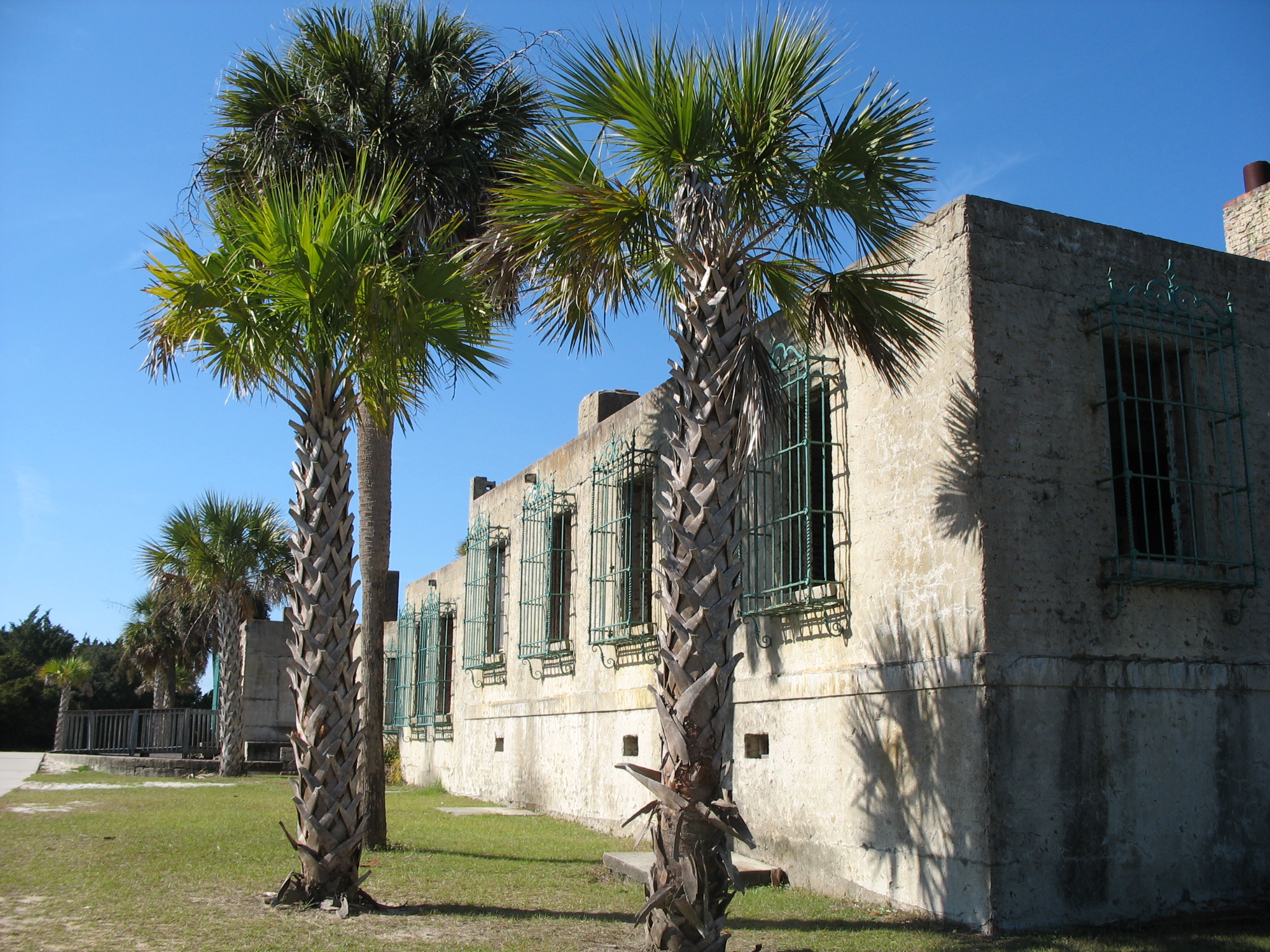
Atalaya, ocean front

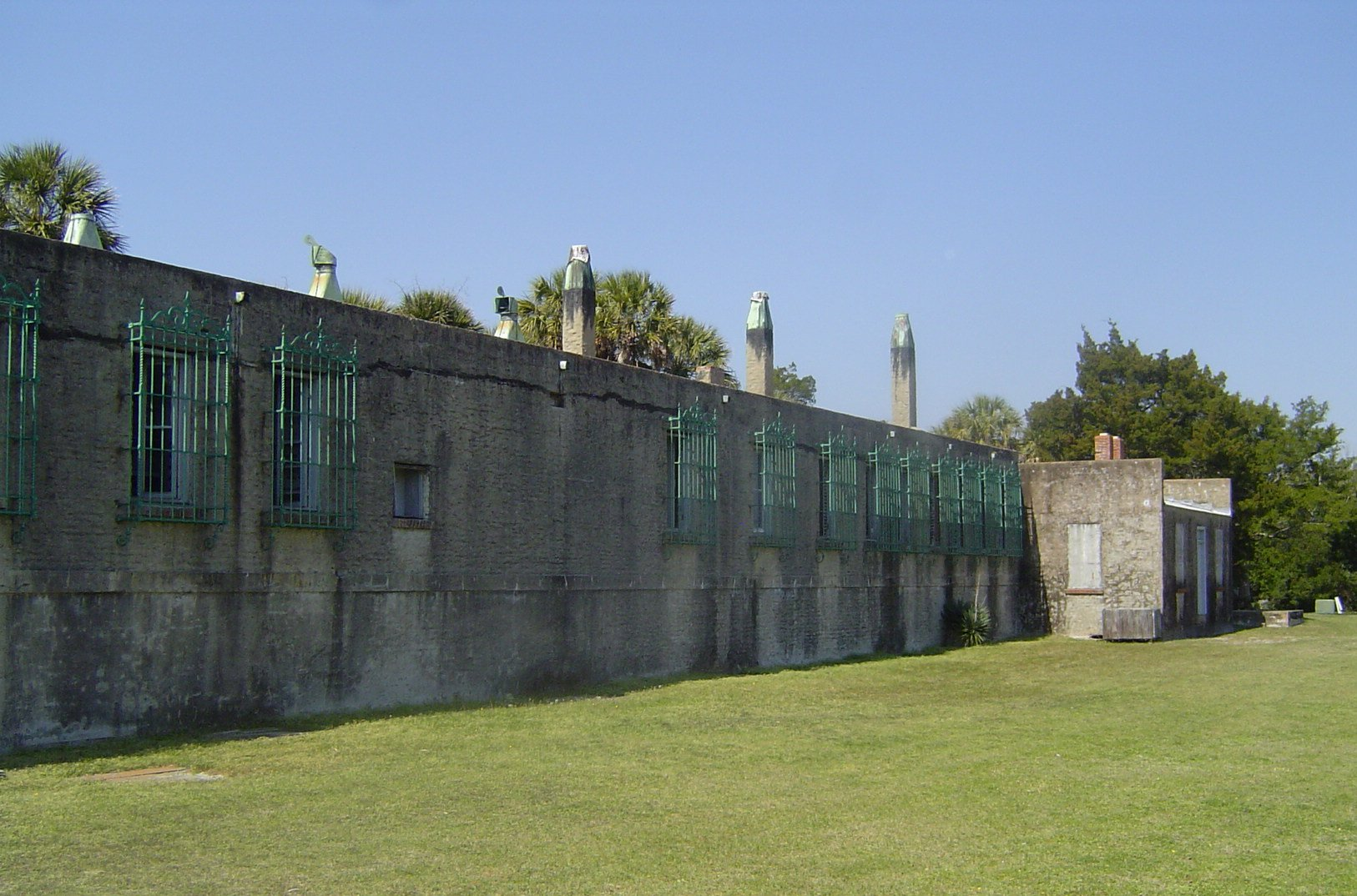
Atalaya, north side

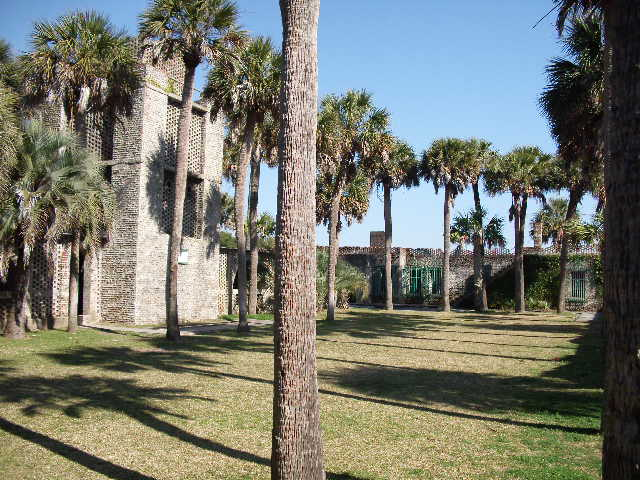
The tower

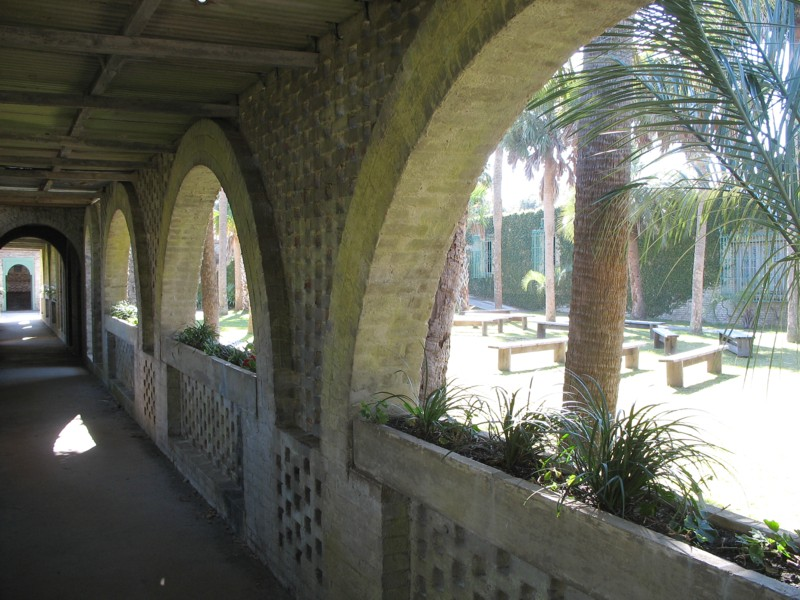
Covered Walkway

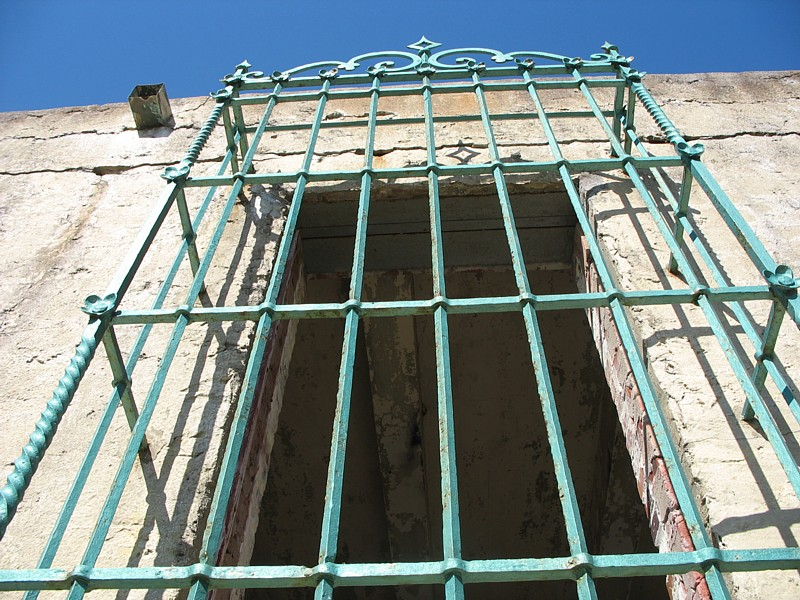
Wrought iron grill on window

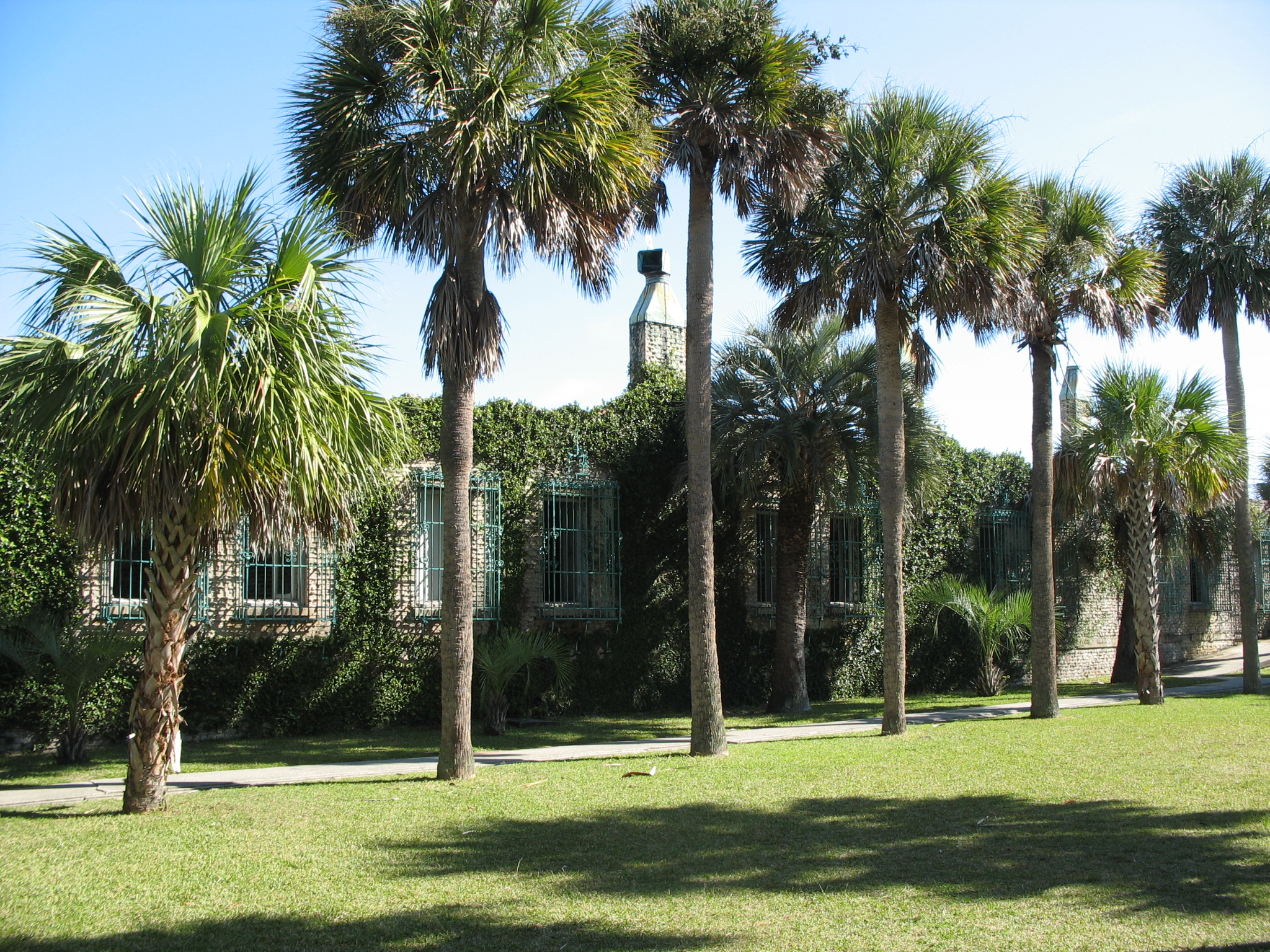
Courtyard

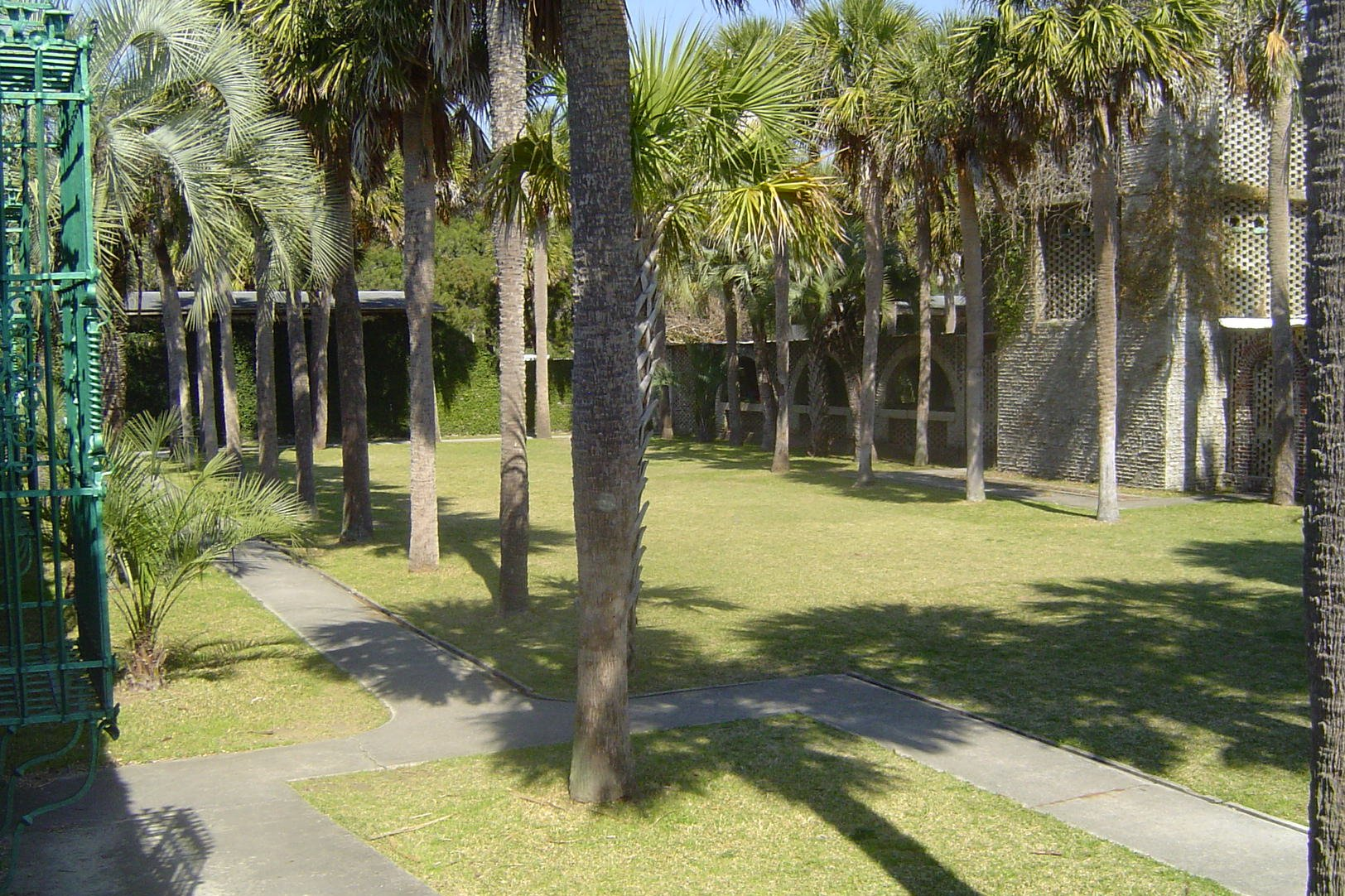
Inside Courtyard Walk

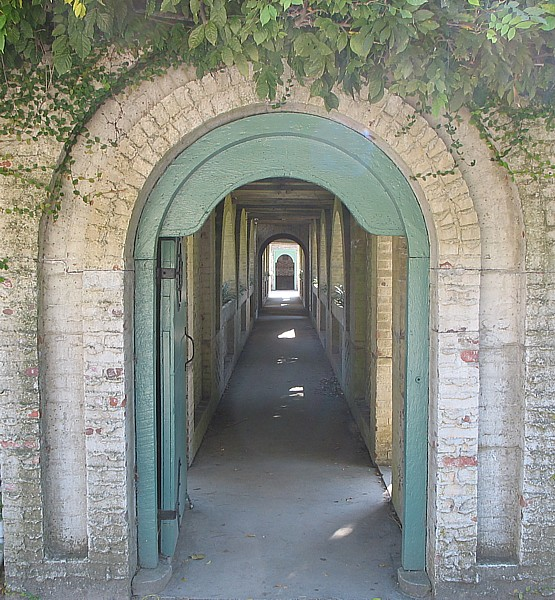
Entrance

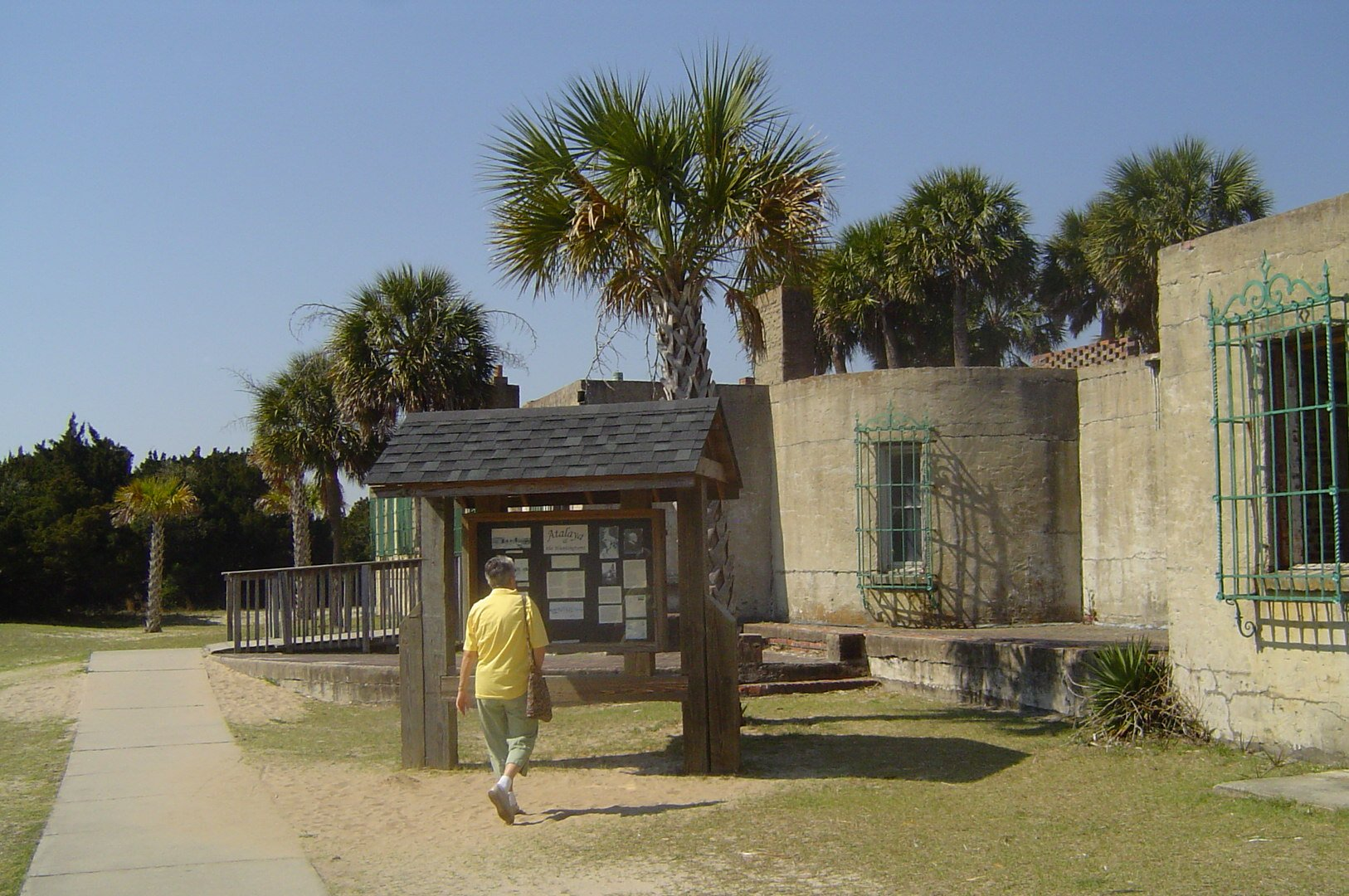
Back
