= Edward McCartan =

American sculptor (1879–1947)

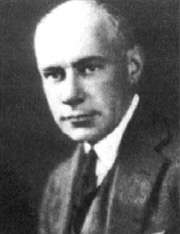
Edward McCartan

Edward Francis McCartan (August 16, 1879 – September 20, 1947) was an American sculptor, best known for his decorative bronzes done in an elegant style popular in the 1920s.

== Life ==
Born in Albany, New York, he studied at the Pratt Institute, with Herbert Adams. He also studied at the Art Students League of New York with George Grey Barnard and Hermon Atkins MacNeil, and then in Paris for three years under Jean Antoine Injalbert before his return to the United States in 1910.

In 1914, McCartan became the Director of the sculpture department of the Beaux-Arts Institute of Design in New York City. Eleanor Mary Mellon was among those he taught during his career.

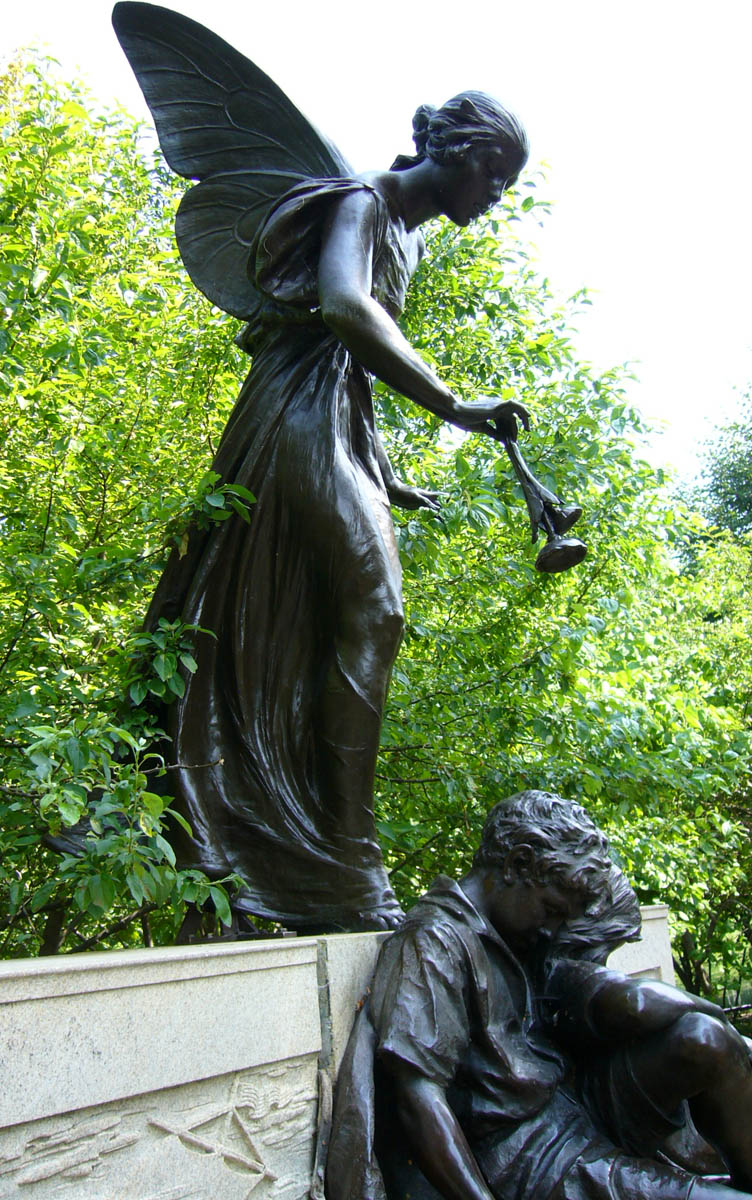
Eugene Field Memorial (detail)

Posthumously honored by the National Sculpture Society, his public monuments were few—but the Eugene Field Memorial ("Winken, Blinken, and Nod") can still be found in the Lincoln Park Zoo, Chicago.

McCartan's sculpture, The Nude, was stolen from the Grosse Pointe War Memorial in Michigan and was discovered at the bottom of the Detroit River eight years later.

McCartan sculpted the 19th issue of the Society of Medalists, Peace in the New World/War in the Old World. Other work can be found at Brookgreen Gardens in South Carolina. New Jersey Bell Headquarters Building, a national historic site in Newark, New Jersey includes pilasters by the artist. He worked on a pediment for the Department of Labor Building, in 1934 to 1935. His work was also part of the sculpture event in the art competition at the 1932 Summer Olympics.

He died in New Rochelle, New York, September 20, 1947.

== Works ==
- Girl Drinking from a Shell, c. 1915 Reading Public Museum
- Nymph and Satyr, 1920, The Century Association
- Boy and Panther, 1920
- Dream Lady, Eugene Field Memorial 1922, Lincoln Park
- Diana, 1923, Metropolitan Museum of Art
- Diana and Hound, 1923, High Museum of Art
- Dionysus (McCartan) 1923 remodeled 1936 Brookgreen Gardens
- Diana and Doe 1924
- Bather, 1935, Pennsylvania Academy of the Fine Arts
- Nymph and Frog, 1938
