= Brookgreen Gardens =

Park in Murrells Inlet, SC, U.S.

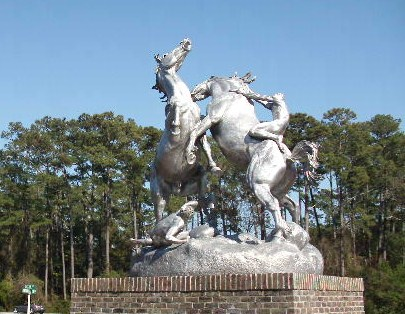
- Fighting Stallions – by Anna Hyatt Huntington at garden park entrance.
- Established: 1932
- Location: Murrells Inlet, South Carolina, U.S.
- Coordinates: 33°31′14″N 79°5′59″W
- Type: Sculpture garden and wildlife preserve
- Website: brookgreen.org
- Brookgreen Gardens
- U.S. National Register of Historic Places
- U.S. National Historic Landmark District – Contributing property
- Nearest city: Murrells Inlet, South Carolina, U.S.
- Area: 9,100 acres (37 km^{2})
- Architect: Anna Hyatt Huntington
- Architectural style: Sculpture gardens
- Part of: Atalaya and Brookgreen Gardens (ID84002045)
- NRHP reference No.: 78002510

Significant dates
- Added to NRHP: April 15, 1978
- Designated NHLDCP: October 5, 1992

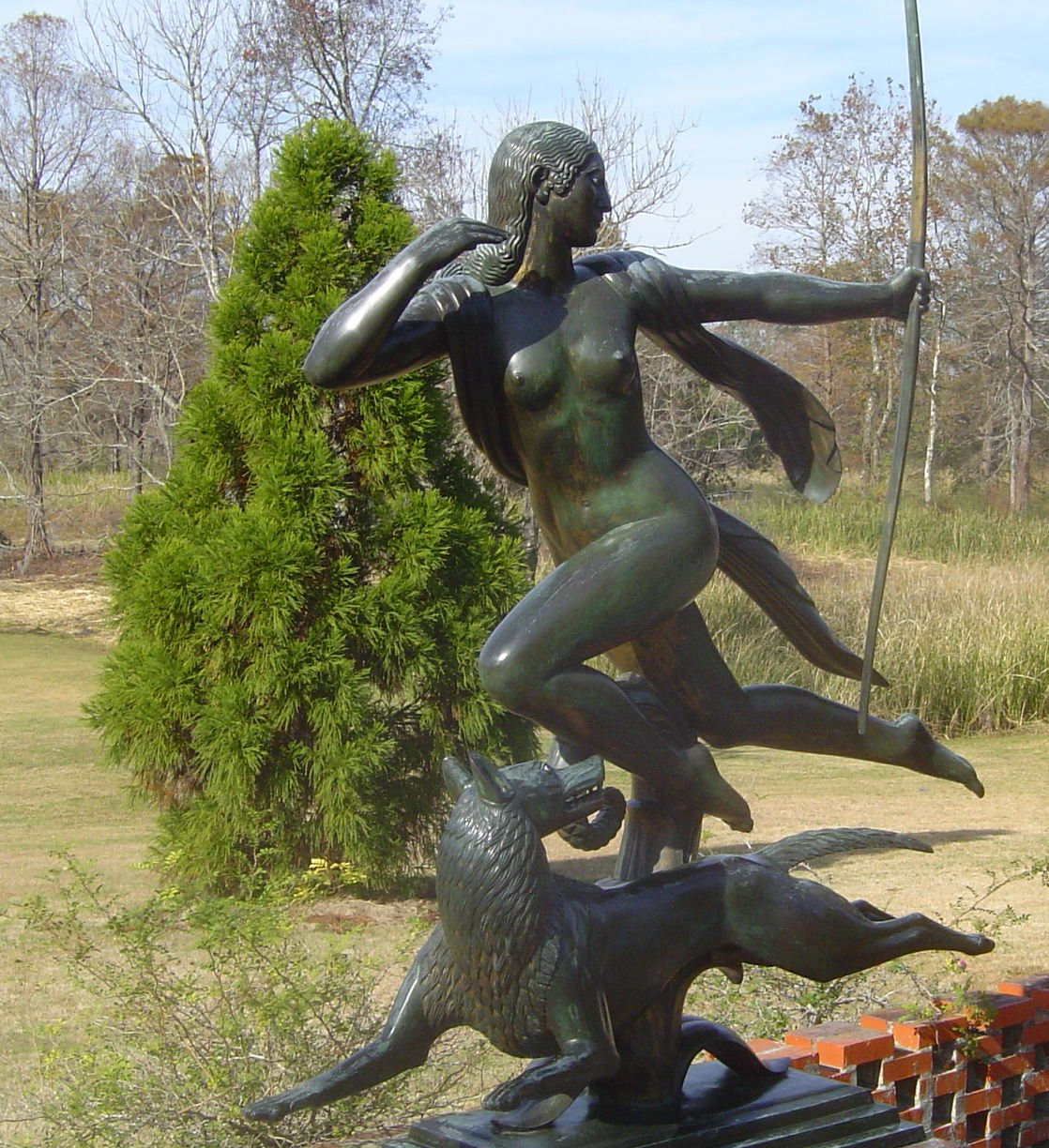
Diana by Paul Manship

Brookgreen Gardens is a sculpture garden and wildlife preserve, located just south of Murrells Inlet, in South Carolina, US. The 9,100-acre (37 km^{2}) property includes several themed gardens featuring American figurative sculptures, the Lowcountry Zoo, and trails through several ecosystems in nature reserves on the property. It was founded by Archer Milton Huntington, stepson of railroad magnate Collis Potter Huntington, and Anna Hyatt Huntington, his wife, to feature sculptures by Anna and her sister Harriet Randolph Hyatt Mayor, along with other American sculptors. Brookgreen Gardens was opened in 1932. It was developed on property of four former rice plantations, taking its name from the former Brookgreen Plantation, which dates to the antebellum period.

== Early history ==
The property that now comprises Brookgreen Gardens was four rice plantations. The plantations from south to north were The Oaks, Brookgreen, Springfield, and Laurel Hill. The current gardens and surrounding facilities are located completely within the former Brookgreen Plantation, which was owned by Joshua John Ward. Before his death in 1853, he held more than 1,000 enslaved African Americans and in 1860 his estate (in his name) was the largest slaveholder in the United States.

Only a handful of relics survive on the former plantations. The Alston (or Allston) cemetery survives on the grounds of The Oaks plantation. Gov. Joseph Alston and his child are buried in the cemetery. The same grave is a memorial to the governor's wife Theodosia Burr Alston, daughter of Vice President of the United States Aaron Burr, who was lost at sea. Her ghost is said to haunt the Grand Strand, looking for her father. The rice mill at Laurel Hill is all that stands of that plantation today. During the American Civil War, Confederates built an earthen structure on the grounds to block Union Navy ships from coming into the tidal rivers.

== The Huntingtons ==
Archer and Anna Hyatt Huntington of Redding, Connecticut purchased the four plantations in order to develop gardens to showcase her sculptures. Situated on Waccamaw Neck in Georgetown County, South Carolina, between the Waccamaw River and the Atlantic Ocean, Brookgreen Gardens is the country's first public sculpture garden. It has the largest collection in the world of figurative sculpture by American artists in an outdoor setting. It is also a nature and historical preserve with a small zoo and a nature exhibition center.

Archer and Anna Hyatt Huntington first visited the area in 1929. Because they were captivated by its beauty, they purchased nearly 9,100 acres (37 km^{2}) of forest, swamp, rice fields, and beachfront. They intended to establish a winter home on the coast, but Anna saw the potential of the property. They began to develop her vision of making it a showcase for her sculptures. Archer, son of philanthropists Arabella Worsham Huntington and stepson of Collis Huntington, and Anna have donated property and contributed to U.S. arts and culture in a number of states. Her sculpture of Joan of Arc is a feature of New York City's Riverside Park.

== Public landmark ==
=== Sculpture gardens ===
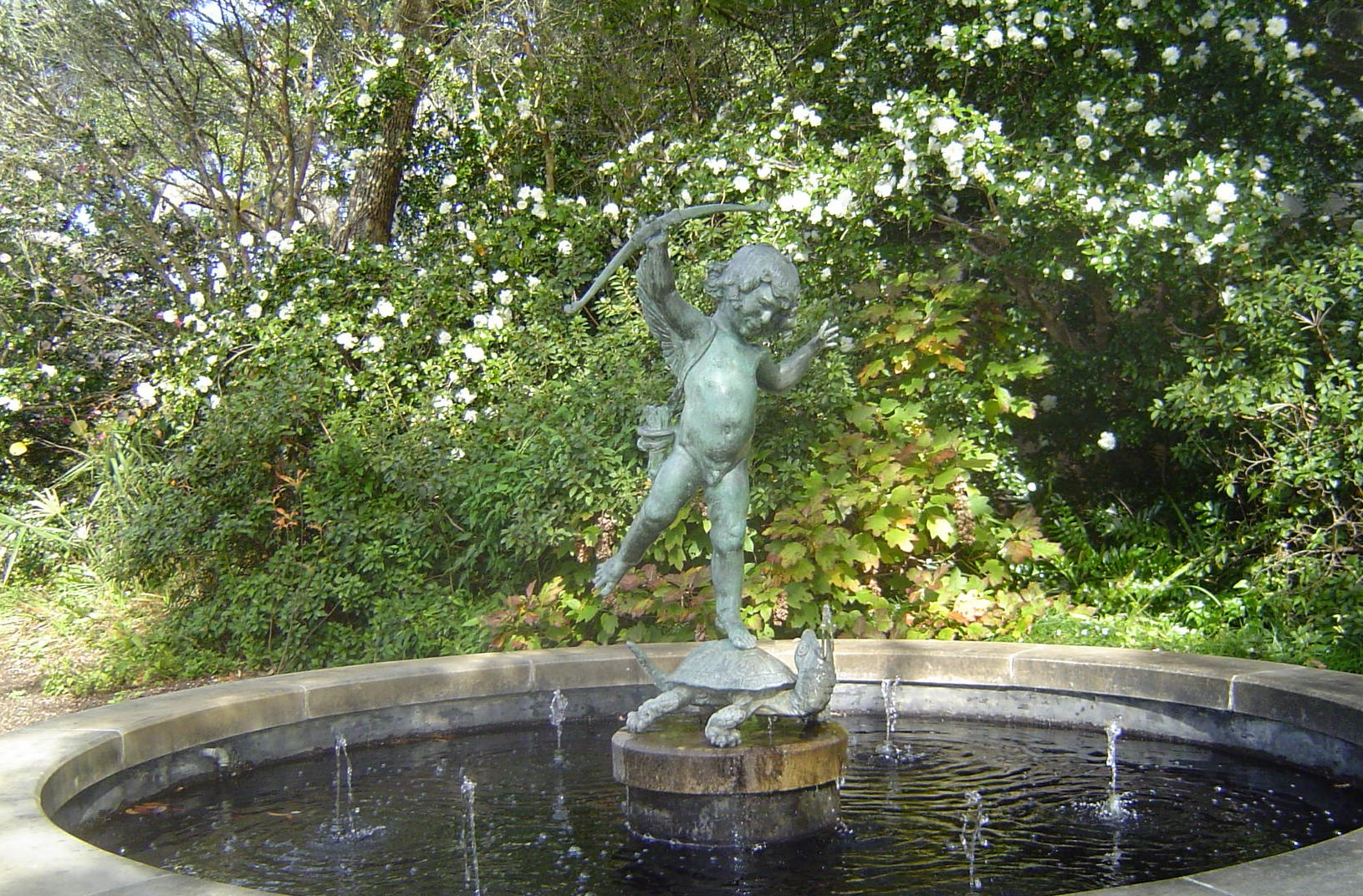
The Tortoise Fountain by Janet Scudder

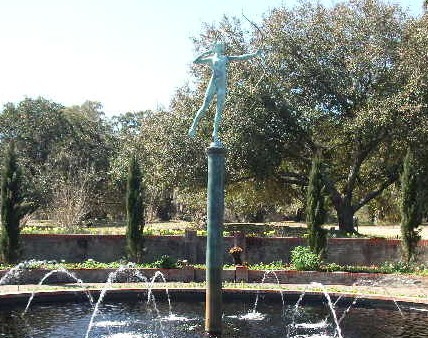
Diana by Augustus Saint-Gaudens in garden fountain setting

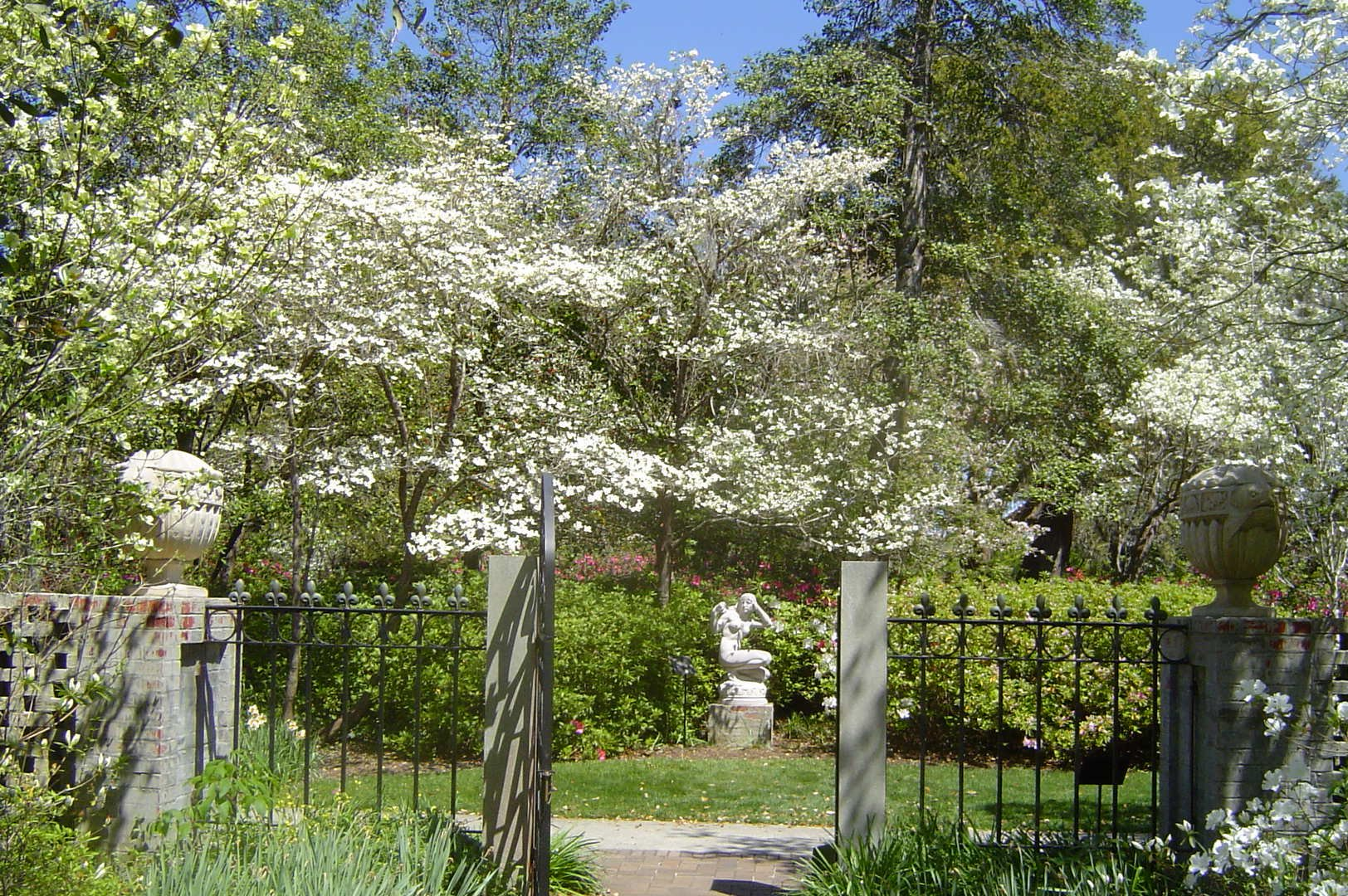
Brookgreen Gardens, with old gate and sculpture

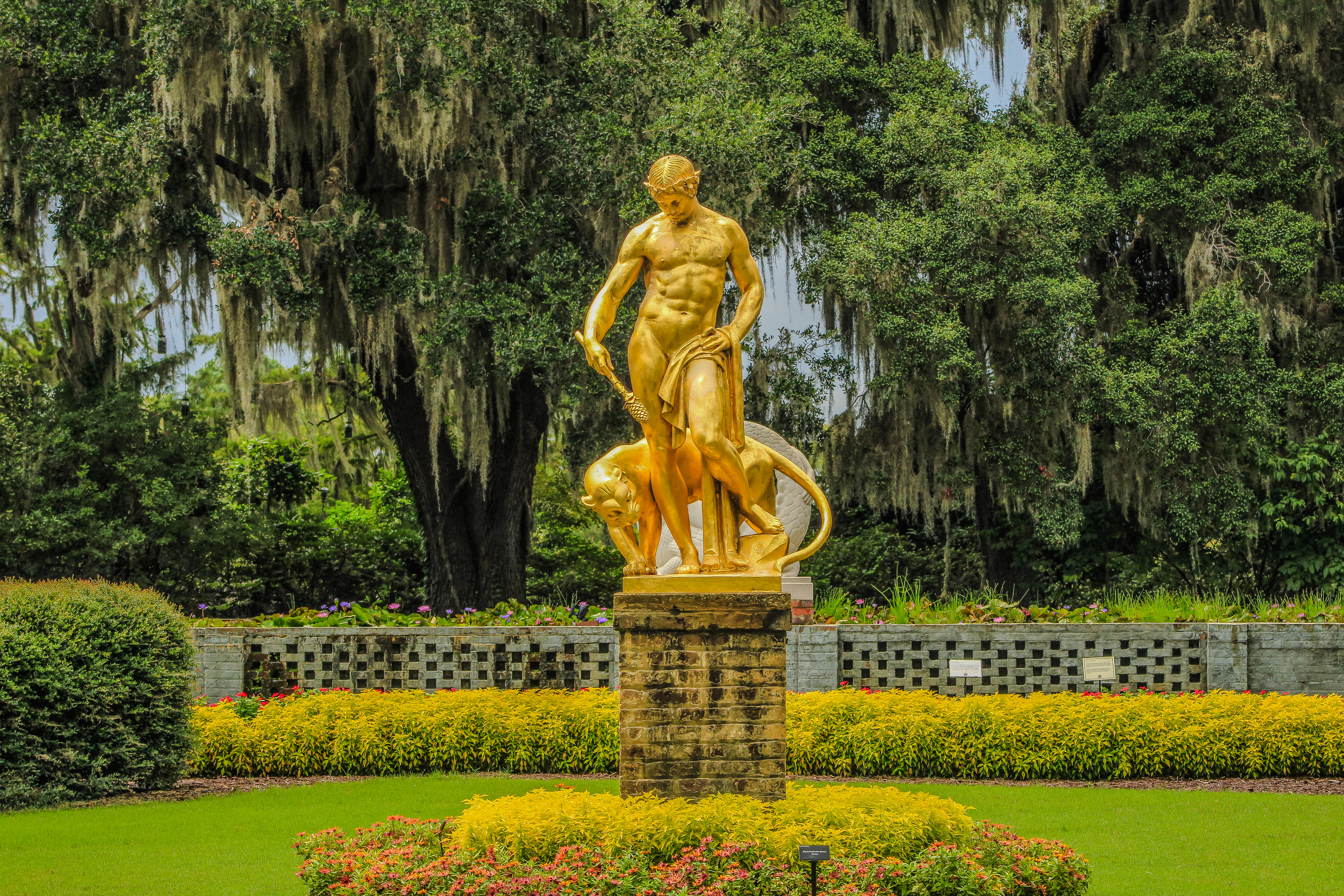
Dionysus by Edward Francis McCartan

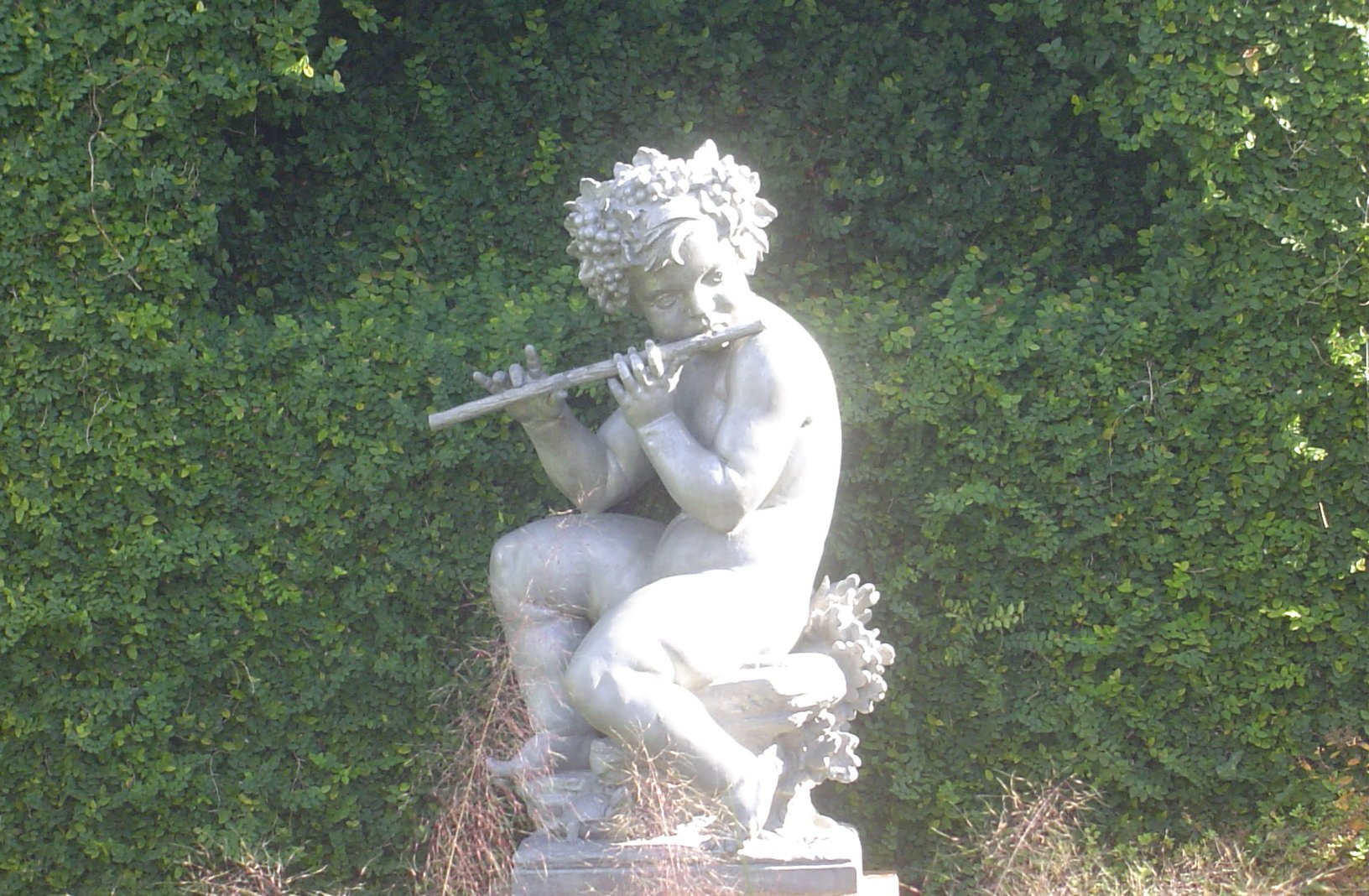
Wood Nymph by Henry Hering

About 1,445 works of American figurative sculpture are displayed at the Archer and Anna Hyatt Huntington Sculpture Garden. Many of the works are by Hyatt Huntington, but other artists are also featured. Walkways and garden paths link the sculptures in their distinctive garden, fountain, or landscape settings, with vistas of the scenery surrounding them. A 1,600-acre (650 ha) area of Brookgreen Gardens was listed on the National Register of Historic Places in 1978. The sculpture garden portion, 551 acres (223 ha), of Brookgreen Gardens was included in the designation of Atalaya and Brookgreen Gardens as a National Historic Landmark in 1984. Atalaya Castle is just across U.S. 17, which cuts through the former combined Huntington property. A seventy-inch long sea horse, sculpted by Joseph Kiselewski, was place in Brookgreen Gardens in 1942.

The sculpture gardens also include works by:

- Robert Alexander Baillie
- Gutzon Borglum
- Joseph Lorkowski Boulton
- Clio Hinton Bracken
- Cornelia Van Auken Chapin
- Henry Clews
- Joseph Bailey Ellis
- Sally James Farnham
- Joseph Charles Fleri
- Vincent Glinsky
- Karl Gruppe
- Ethel Painter Hood
- Edith Howland
- Cecil de Blaquiere Howard
- Anna Hyatt Huntington
- Leo Lentelli
- Donald De Lue
- Albino Manca
- Edward Francis McCartan
- Eleanor Mary Mellon
- Roland Hinton Perry
- Attilio Piccirilli
- Furio Piccirilli
- Horatio Piccirilli
- Augustus Saint-Gaudens
- Louis St. Gaudens
- Marion Sanford
- Janet Scudder
- Amory Coffin Simons
- Erwin Springweiler
- Charles Eugene Tefft

=== Lowcountry Trail ===
Winner of the South Carolina Heritage Tourism Award, the Lowcountry Trail is a boardwalk that crosses the hillside overlooking Mainfield, a restored rice field of the former Brookgreen Plantation. For enslaved African Americans on Brookgreen Plantation, this hill was a bridge between the world of daily work and life in the slave village beyond the crest of the hill. The rhythms of life – planting, growing, harvesting, threshing – changed seasonally for everyone on the rice plantation.

Archaeological survey and excavation projects have revealed the remains of four structures on the hillside: the site of the overseer's residence at the apex of the hill, and its kitchen, smokehouse and dependency closer to the edge of the rice field. Along the trail, interpretive panels that describe life on a rice plantation and four stainless steel figures have been placed to represent the Plantation Owner, the Overseer, and an Enslaved African Male and an Enslaved African Female. These figures were created in stainless steel by Babette Bloch.

==== Lowcountry Trail Audio Tour ====
The Lowcountry Trail Audio Tour is a public education program that emphasizes historic preservation. The tour winds along the Ricefield Overlook and adjacent rice field and is free with garden admission.

=== Zoo and plantation sites ===
The Lowcountry Zoo and the Lowcountry Center are also on the property. 'Trekker tours' are conducted on the backroads of the former plantations. Recent archeological work has uncovered the foundations of several buildings at The Oaks plantation. Ponds have been created from the former 'Brookgreen' plantation house sites.

=== Natural areas ===
The Atlantic Coast side of the property was later leased to the state of South Carolina to form Huntington Beach State Park. Boat tours are available from here with views of Sandy Island. A self-guided tour of the nature trail shows off the 2000 identified species of life, including longleaf pines, Spanish moss draped live oaks, and vistas of the river, and nearby marshland. The gardens make every effort to preserve the natural environment.

=== Nights of a Thousand Candles ===
Every year, the Brookgreen Gardens are lit with more than 2,700 candles and countless lights set among the plants, trees and sculptures of the garden. Tickets for the same are available every year for visitors.

=== Labyrinth ===
The Labyrinth at Brookgreen Gardens is located along the north end of the Trail Beyond the Garden Wall. It was built in 2009 and underwent a substantial redesign in 2014 under the direction of artist Kenny Pellar. It is maintained today by both staff and volunteers as an oasis for members and guests. The Labyrinth is available to walkers any time the Gardens are open. However, the Labyrinth will be closed when weather or river conditions indicate safety concerns.

== Awards and recognition ==
- Top 10 Public Gardens in the U.S. by Coastal Living Magazine
- American Public Gardens Association Award for Garden Excellence, 2019
- Gari Melchers Memorial Medal from the Artists' Fellowship, 2018
- USAToday 10Best - #9 in Best Botanical Garden category, 2018
- USAToday 10Best - Nights of a Thousand Candles Top 10 in Best Botanical Garden Holiday Lights category, 2018

== See also ==
- List of botanical gardens and arboretums in the United States
- List of sculpture parks

== Photo gallery ==
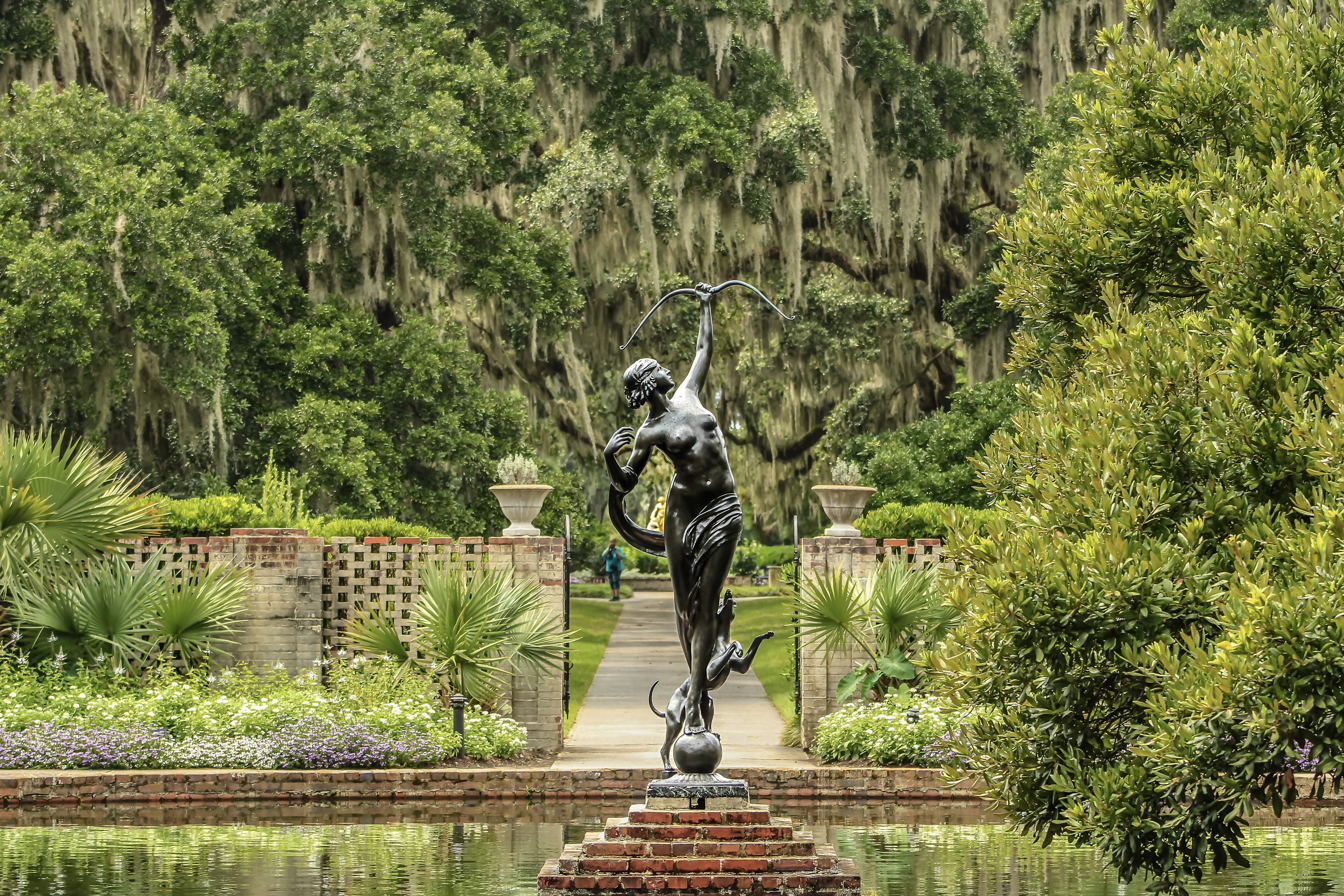
Diana of the Chase by Anna Hyatt Huntington (1922)

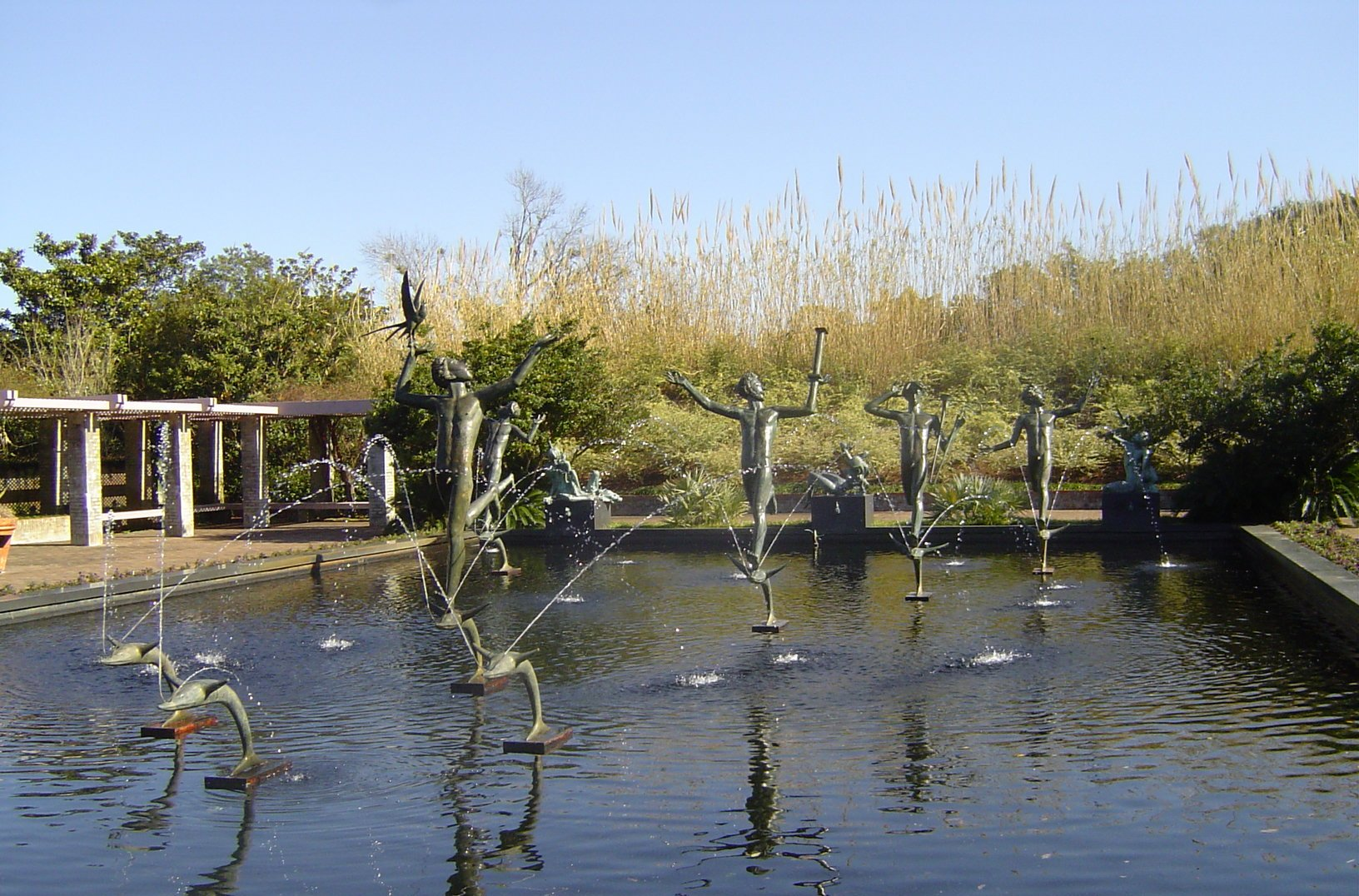
Fountain of the Muses by Carl Milles (1949-1955)

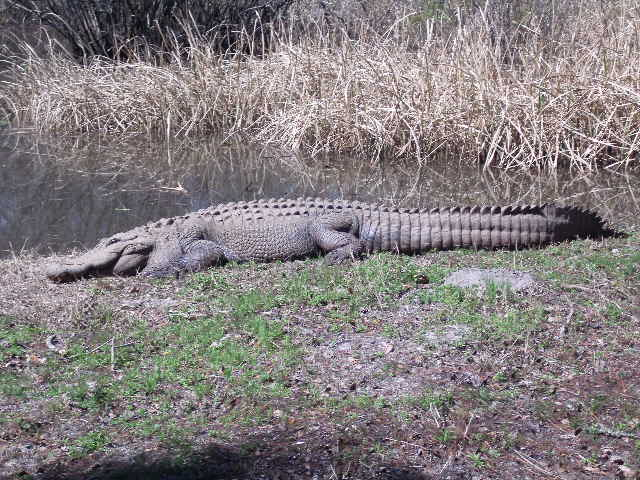
Resident alligator named Cowboy at Lowcountry Zoo

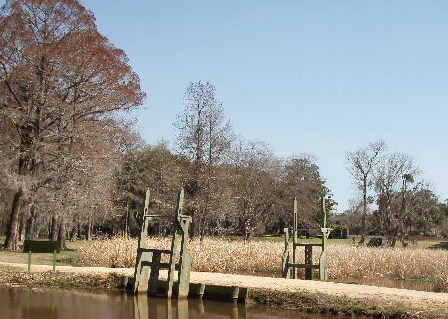
Rice mill 'trunk' site in Lowcountry plantations area

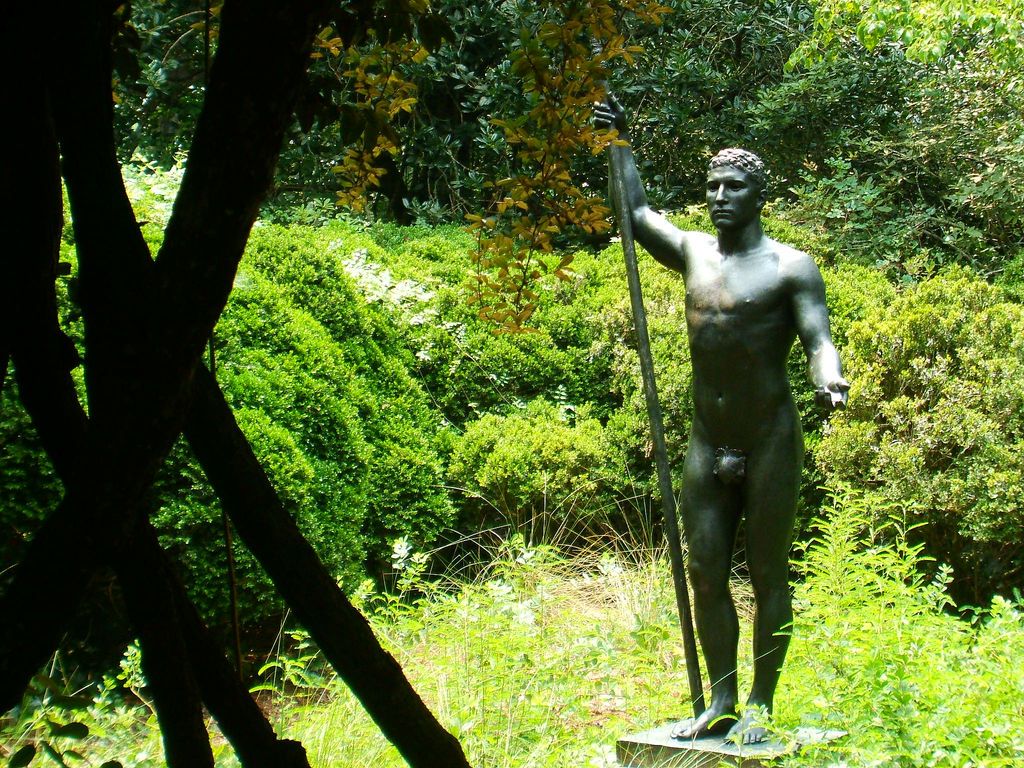
Athlete, sculpture in garden by Rudulph Evans (1915)

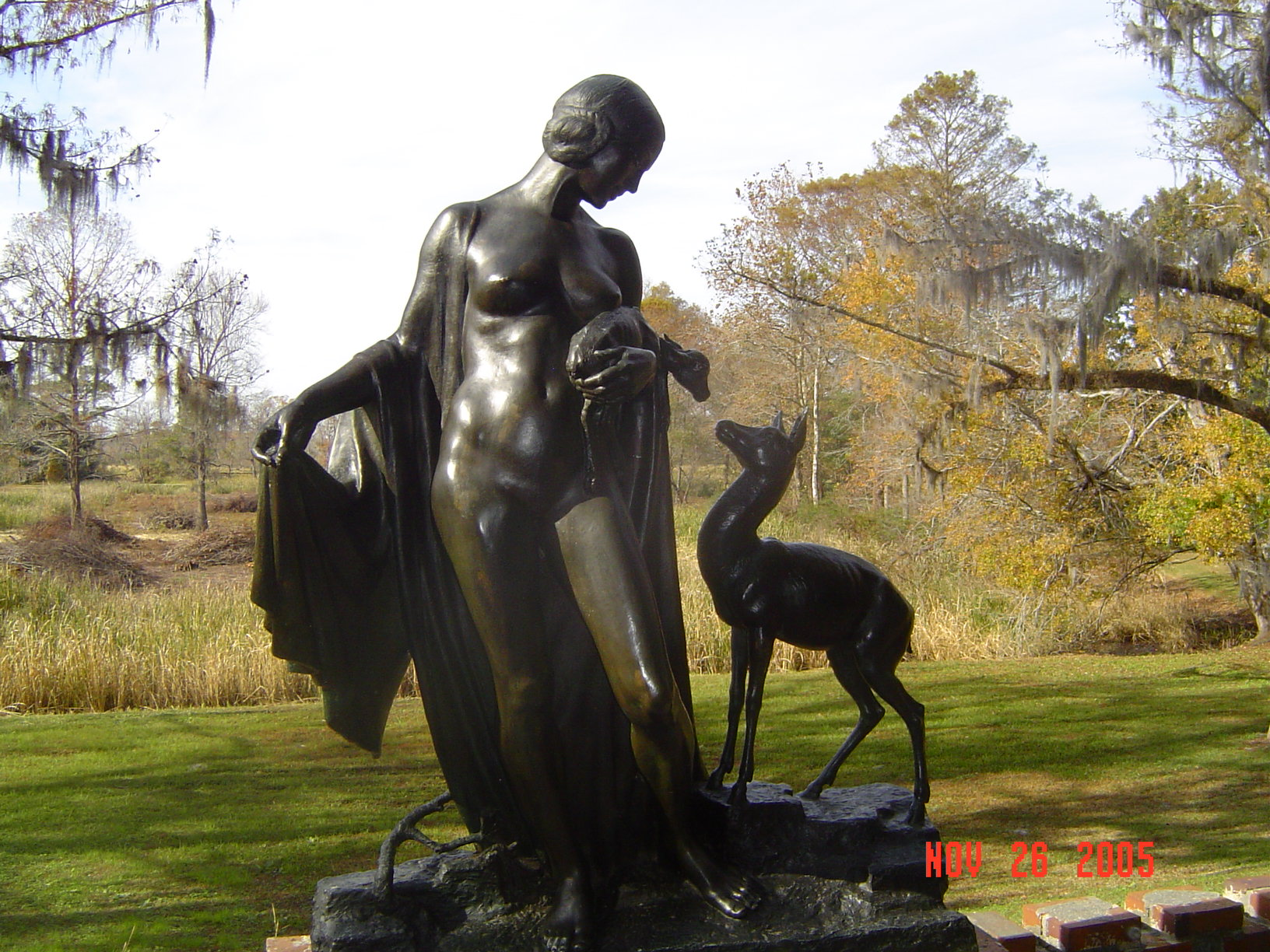
Forest Idyll by Albin Polasek (1924)
