= Eleanor Mary Mellon =

American sculptor

- Born: 1894; Narberth, Pennsylvania
- Died: 1979
- Known for: Sculpture
- Awards: Barnet Prize of the National Academy of Design; Bronze medal, Society of Washington Artists (1931)

Eleanor Mary Mellon (1894–1979) was an American sculptor.

A native of Narberth, Pennsylvania, Mellon studied with Robert Ingersoll Aitken, Harriet Whitney Frishmuth, Charles Grafly, Edward McCartan, Victor Salvatore, and Adolph Alexander Weinman. She won numerous awards, including the Barnet Prize of the National Academy of Design, a bronze medal from the Society of Washington Artists in 1931, an honorable mention from the National Association of Women Painters and Sculptors in 1932, and others. Her work was exhibited widely in the United States, and she was a member of the National Sculpture Society and the American Federation of Arts. Brookgreen Gardens is among the collections holding examples of her work. Mellon was noted for her ecclesiastical work. She was a full academician of the National Academy of Design.
