= Huntington Beach State Park =

State park in South Carolina, United States

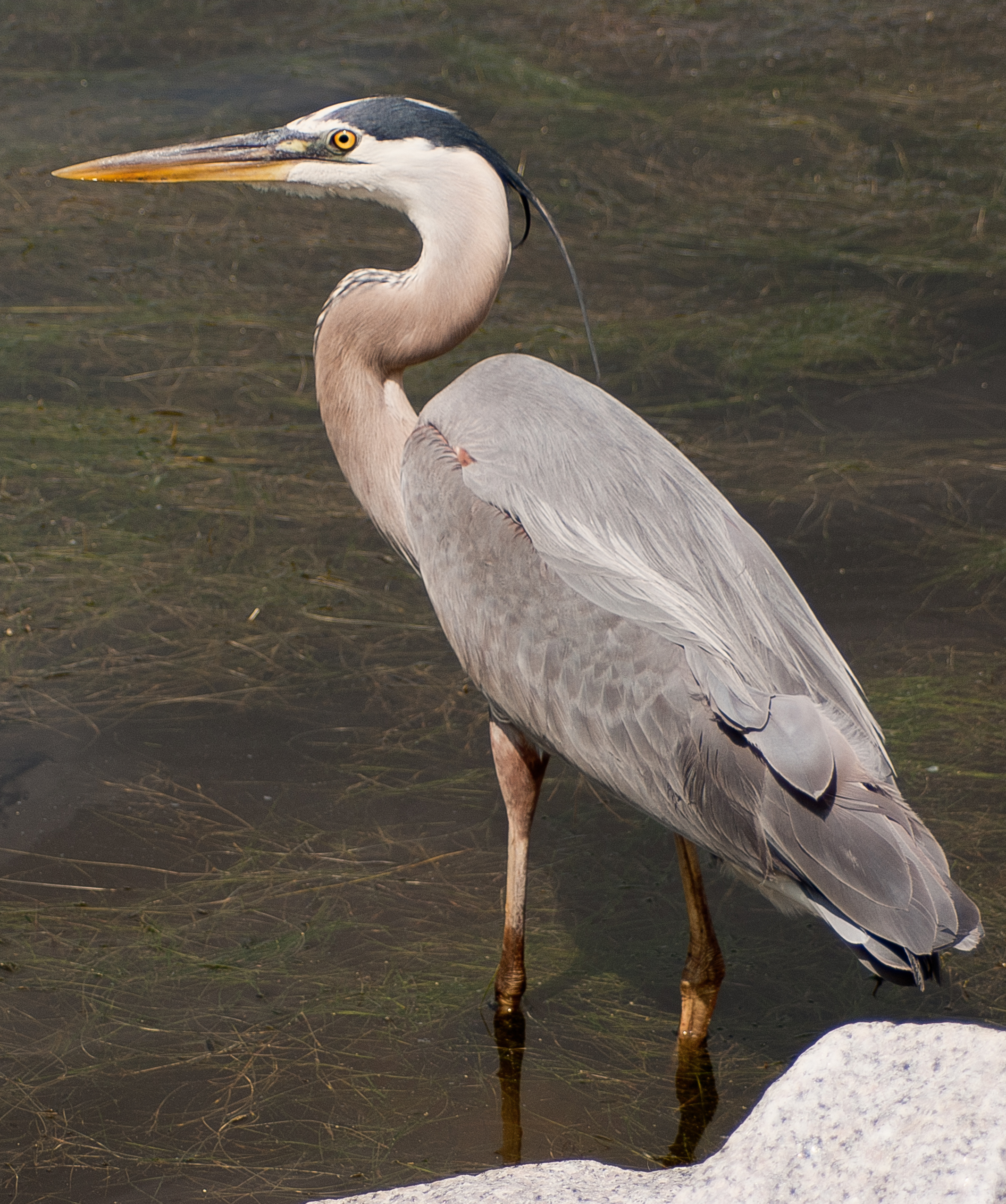
- Great blue heron (Ardea herodias) at Huntington Beach Park
- Interactive map of Huntington Beach State Park
- Nearest city: Murrells Inlet, Georgetown County, South Carolina
- Coordinates: 33°30′50″N 79°3′40″W
- Area: 2,500 acres (10.1 km^{2})
- Camp sites: 107 30 Amp standard campsites 21 30 Amp full service campsites 42 50 Amp full service campsites 6 walk-in tent sites
- Hiking trails: 2
- Website: Official website

Huntington Beach State Park is a 2500 acre coastal preserve and state park near Murrells Inlet, in Georgetown County, South Carolina. It has a large sandy beach, few beach-goers, and numerous wild birds to watch over the seasons.

== History ==
The park, originally property of Anna Hyatt Huntington and Archer M. Huntington, was leased after his death and takes its name from him. The 2500 acre (10 km^{2}) tract was leased to the state in 1960 for use as a state park. Mrs. Huntington died in 1973. Atalaya was listed on the National Register of Historic Places in 1984, and was included in the designation of Atalaya and Brookgreen Gardens as a National Historic Landmark in 1984.

Atalaya and Brookgreen

He and his wife's winter home, Atalaya Castle, is located in the park. Built during the Great Depression by only local workers, the residence was designed to withstand hurricanes.

The studio of his wife, the noted 20th-century American sculptor Anna Hyatt Huntington, was part of the compound. Many of her significant sculptures are in nearby Brookgreen Gardens, an extension of the former Huntington estate, now a public sculpture garden.

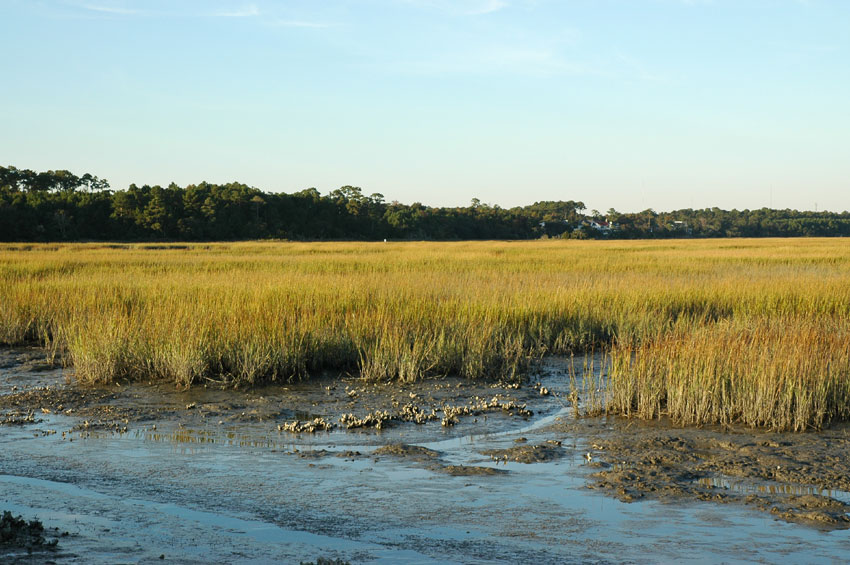
Afternoon view across the expansive salt marsh at Huntington Beach State Park in the fall

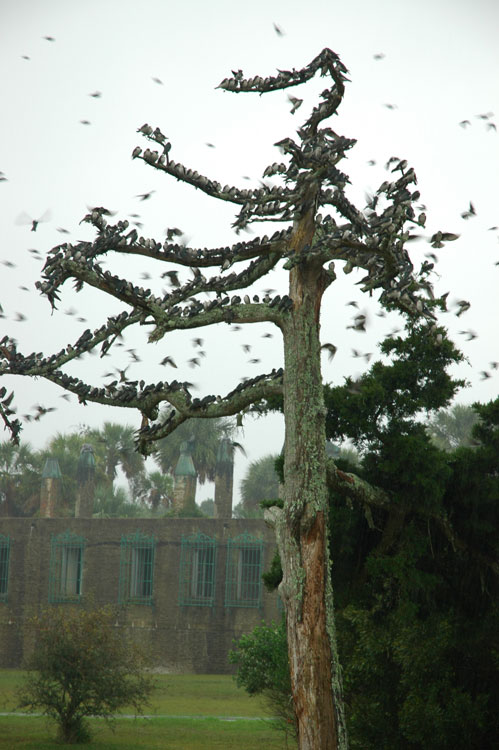
Huge tree swallow flock preparing for fall migration takes refuge from the rain on a snag in front of Atalaya

== Features ==
The Friends of Huntington Beach State Park offer scheduled tours of Atalaya Castle, and operate the Atalaya Visitor Center with exhibits about the house and the Huntingtons.

=== Birding ===
Local birders frequently refer to the park as "HBSP" in communications. The park features various species of birds of the Southeast coast of the United States for bird watching.

It hosts many types of ducks and waders like roseate spoonbills in winter in both fresh and saltwater marshes. It has a jetty where oceanbirds like gannets, loons, scoters and occasionally alcids like razorbills and murres can be found. The large tree swallow (Tachycineta bicolor) flocks here.

=== Nature Center ===
The Nature Center features natural history displays and live animals, including a saltwater touch tank and a live baby alligator among its exhibits. Park naturalists offer free programs about the park's wildlife and habitat. The building sits beside the salt marsh, north of the causeway entry road at Huntington Beach State Park and the park's marsh boardwalk.

The original building, was destroyed in a fire in the early morning hours on Wednesday, July 20, 2016, caused by a lightning strike. All of the animals on display within the Education Center were lost in the fire.

The Nature Center was rebuilt beginning 2019 and reopened in September 2020. It is open daily from 10-5pm.

Other park features include: the beach and jetty, hiking, and nature trails and boardwalks, the gift shop and a public campground.

== See also ==
- Atalaya Castle
- Brookgreen Gardens — adjacent sculpture park.
- Anna Hyatt Huntington
