= Clayton Geathers =

American football player (born 1992)

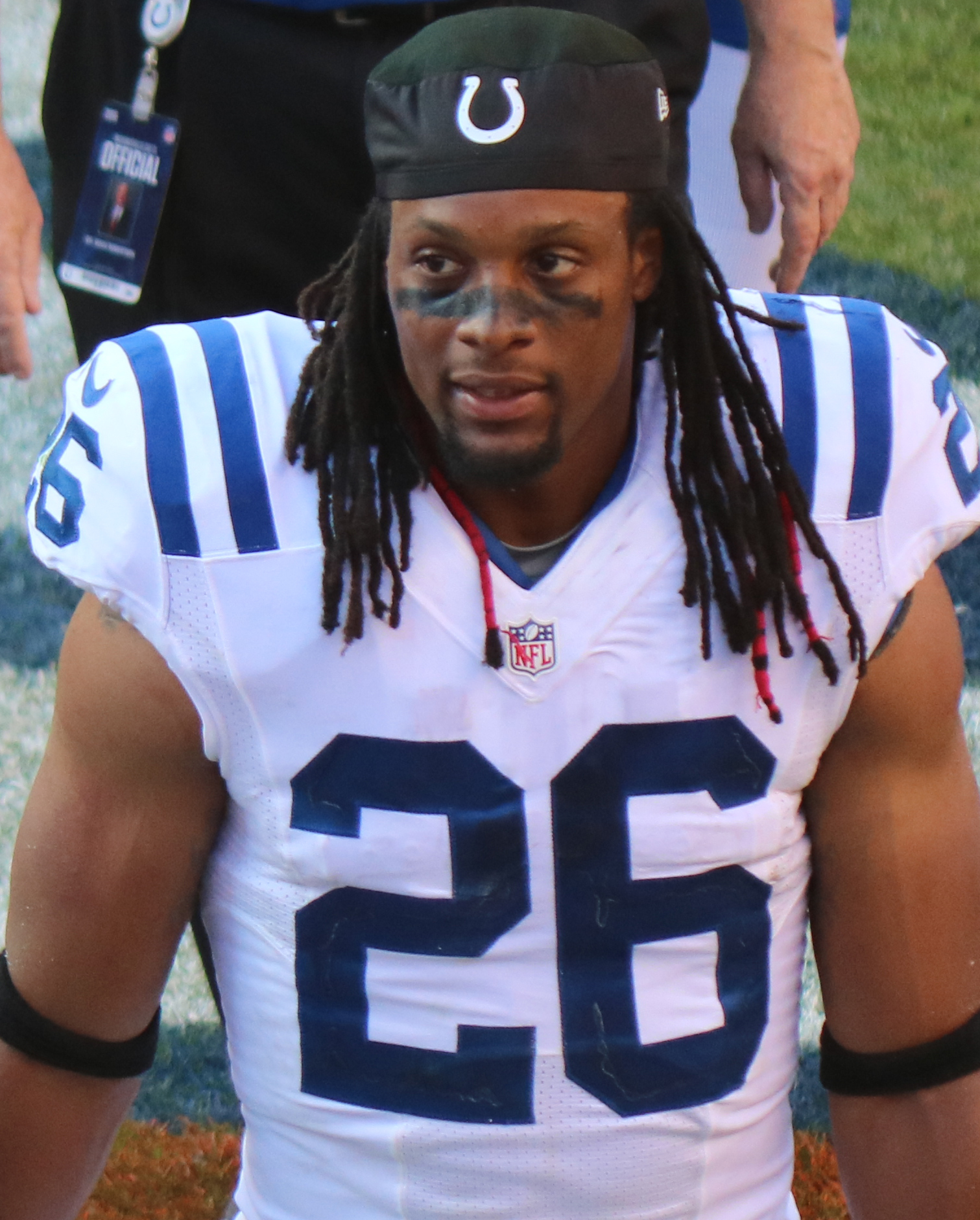
- Geathers with the Indianapolis Colts in 2015

No. 42, 26
- Position: Safety

Personal information
- Born: June 1, 1992 (age 34); Georgetown, South Carolina, U.S.
- Listed height: 6 ft 2 in (1.88 m)
- Listed weight: 216 lb (98 kg)

Career information
- High school: Carvers Bay (Hemingway, South Carolina)
- College: UCF
- NFL draft: 2015: 4th round, 109th overall pick

Career history

Playing
- Indianapolis Colts (2015–2019); Tennessee Titans (2021)*
- * Offseason or practice squad member only

Coaching
- UCF (2022–2023) Assistant director of personnel/defensive backs assistant

Awards and highlights
- AAC Fifth Anniversary Team (2018); First-team All-AAC (2014)

Career NFL statistics
- Total tackles: 244
- Forced fumbles: 2
- Fumble recoveries: 1
- Pass deflections: 10
- Interceptions: 1
- Stats at Pro Football Reference

Clayton Geathers (born June 1, 1992) is an American former professional football player who was a safety in the National Football League (NFL). He played college football for the UCF Knights, and was selected by the Indianapolis Colts in the fourth round of the 2015 NFL draft.

== Early life ==
Geathers attended and played at Carvers Bay High School and help them advance to the Lower State Championship two consecutive years (2007–2008). Geathers was selected to the all-state team twice as a defensive back in 2009 and as a running back in 2008.

== College career ==
Geathers was selected to the All-American Athletic Conference (AAC) Second-team, Sporting News All-AAC Team and Phil Steele's Postseason All-AAC Second-team in his junior season.

Geathers finished third in tackles in University of Central Florida football history with 383 tackles. As a redshirt freshman in 2011, Geather had 67 tackles, the following year as a sophomore had 117 tackles, then as a redshirt junior 100 tackles, and then in his last season Geathers tallied 97 tackles. Geathers also started in 52 games out of a total of 53 games he played in college.

== Professional career ==
=== Pre-draft ===
On December 15, 2014, it was announced that Geathers had accepted his invitation to play in the 2015 Senior Bowl. On January 24, 2015, Geathers attended the Senior Bowl and played for Jacksonville Jaguars head coach Gus Bradley's South team. He recorded four solo tackles as the South lost 34–13 to the North. Geathers attended the NFL Scouting Combine in Indianapolis, Indiana and performed all of the combine drills. He finished second among his position group in the bench press, eighth in the broad jump, and 12th in the short and long shuttle.

External videos
- Clayton Geathers' NFL Combine Workout

On March 25, 2015, Geathers attended UCF's pro day, but opted to stand on his combine numbers and only run positional drills. Team representatives and scouts from all 32 NFL teams attended his pro day, including New England Patriots' head coach Bill Belichick. At the conclusion of the pre-draft process, Geathers was projected to be a fourth to seventh round pick or a priority undrafted free agent. He was ranked as the fifth best strong safety prospect in the draft by DraftScout.com and was ranked the 11th best safety by Scouts Inc.

Pre-draft measurables
Height	Weight	Arm length	Hand span	40-yard dash	10-yard split	20-yard split	20-yard shuttle	Three-cone drill	Vertical jump	Broad jump	Bench press
6 ft 1 5/8 in (1.87 m)	218 lb (99 kg)	31 5/8 in (0.80 m)	9 1/8 in (0.23 m)	4.55 s	1.58 s	2.63 s	4.27 s	7.21 s	37 in (0.94 m)	10 ft 0 in (3.05 m)	22 reps
All values from NFL Combine

=== 2015 ===
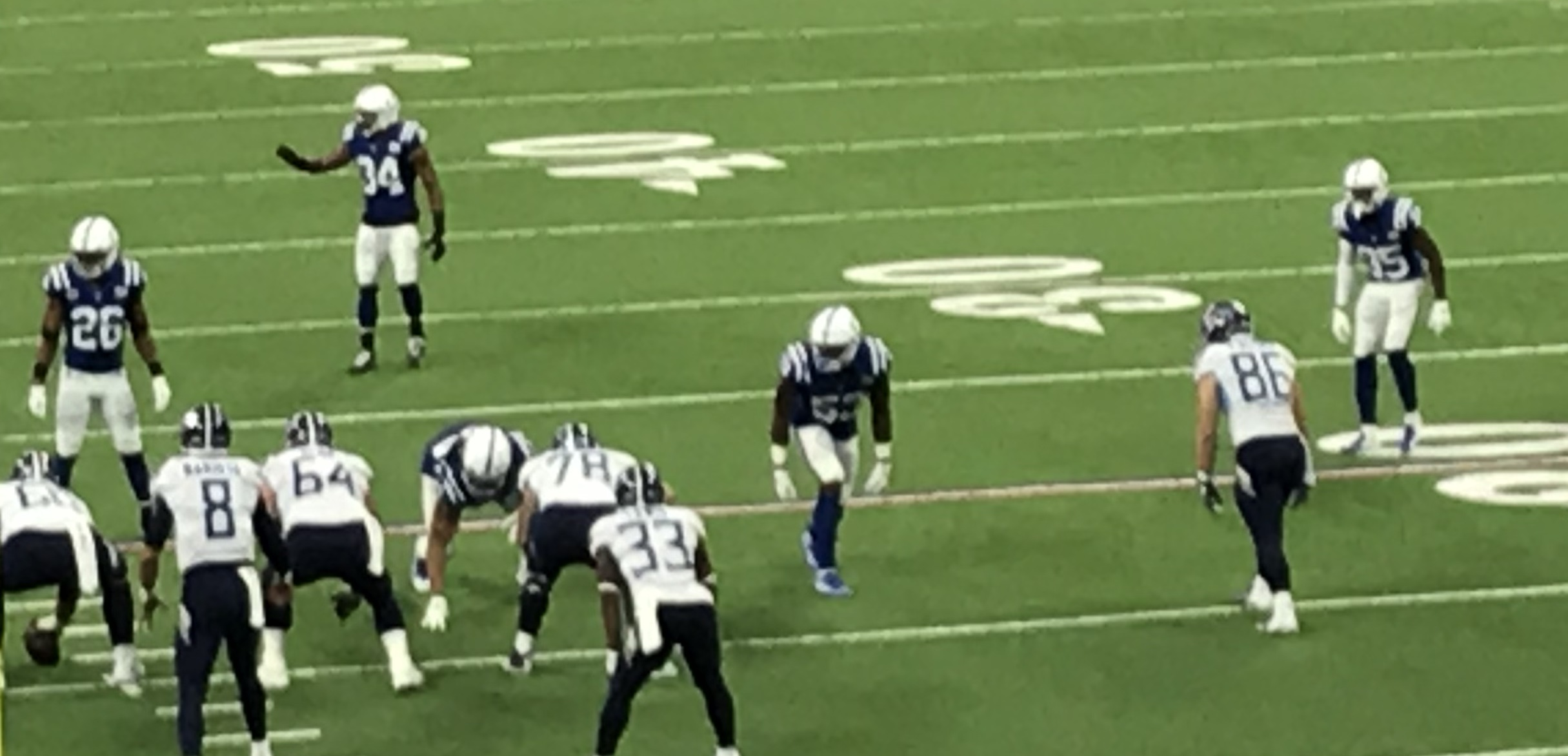
Geathers (far left) in a game against the Tennessee Titans in November 2018.

The Indianapolis Colts selected Geathers in the fourth round (109th overall) of the 2015 NFL draft. Geathers was the sixth safety drafted in 2015. On May 6, 2015, the Colts signed Geathers to a four-year, $2.81 million contract that includes a signing bonus of $533,930.

External videos
- Colts draft Clayton Geathers 109th overall
- NFL Draft Profile: Clayton Geathers

Throughout training camp, he competed to be the starting free safety against Dwight Lowery after it was vacant due to the release of Sergio Brown. Head coach Chuck Pagano named Geathers the backup free safety, behind Dwight Lowery, to begin the regular season.

He made his professional regular season debut in the Colts' season-opener at the Buffalo Bills and recorded two solo tackles and deflected a pass in their 27–14 loss. Geathers was inactive for the Colts' Week 7 loss to the New Orleans Saints due to a knee injury. On November 22, 2015, Geathers earned his first career start after Mike Adams was unable to play due to a hamstring injury. Geathers finished the Colts' 24–21 win at the Atlanta Falcons with a season-high nine combined tackles in Week 11. He finished his rookie season in 2015 with 34 combined tackles (27 solo) and a pass deflection in 15 games and two starts.

=== 2016 ===
On January 5, 2016, the Colts announced their decision to fire defensive coordinator Greg Manusky. On January 7, 2016, the Colts hired former Baltimore Ravens linebackers coach Ted Monachino as their new defensive coordinator. Geathers entered training camp slated as the starting free safety. On July 26, 2016, it was reported that Geathers fractured a bone in his foot during training camp. Pagano named Geathers the starting free safety to start the regular season, alongside strong safety Mike Adams.

External videos
- Clayton Geathers tackles Demarco Murray
- Geathers forces fumble to clinch win

Geathers remained inactive for the Colts' season-opening 39–35 loss to the Detroit Lions due to his foot injury. On September 25, 2016, Geathers recorded six combined tackles and forced a fumble in a 26–22 win against the San Diego Chargers in Week 3. Geathers forced a key fumble by Chargers' tight end Hunter Henry, which was recovered by Colts' teammate Mike Adams, in the fourth quarter. In Week 5, he collected a season-high nine combined tackles during a 29-23 win against the Chicago Bears. On November 20, 2016, Geathers tied his season-high of nine combined tackles and deflected a pass in the Colts' 24–17 victory against the Tennessee Titans in Week 11. He exited in the fourth quarter of the game after sustaining a concussion and neck injury while tackling Titans' running back Demarco Murray during a crucial fourth and one-yard attempt with less than three minutes remaining. On December 12, 2016, the Colts officially placed Geathers on injured reserve due to his neck injury. He finished the season with 59 combined tackles (50 solo) and five pass deflections in nine games and nine starts.

=== 2017 ===
During the offseason, Geathers underwent surgery to repair a bulging herniated disc in his neck in March 2017. On September 2, 2017, the Colts placed Geathers on their physically unable to perform list to start the season as he recovered from neck surgery. On November 14, 2017, the Colts activated Geathers off of their physically unable to perform list. Upon returning from injury, Geathers was named the backup free safety behind Darius Butler. Geathers was inactive for the Colts' Week 16 loss at the Ravens for personal reasons. In Week 17, he collected a season-high three combined tackles during a 22–13 victory against the Houston Texans. Geathers was limited to five games and one start in 2017 and finished the season with eight combined tackles (five solo).

=== 2018 ===
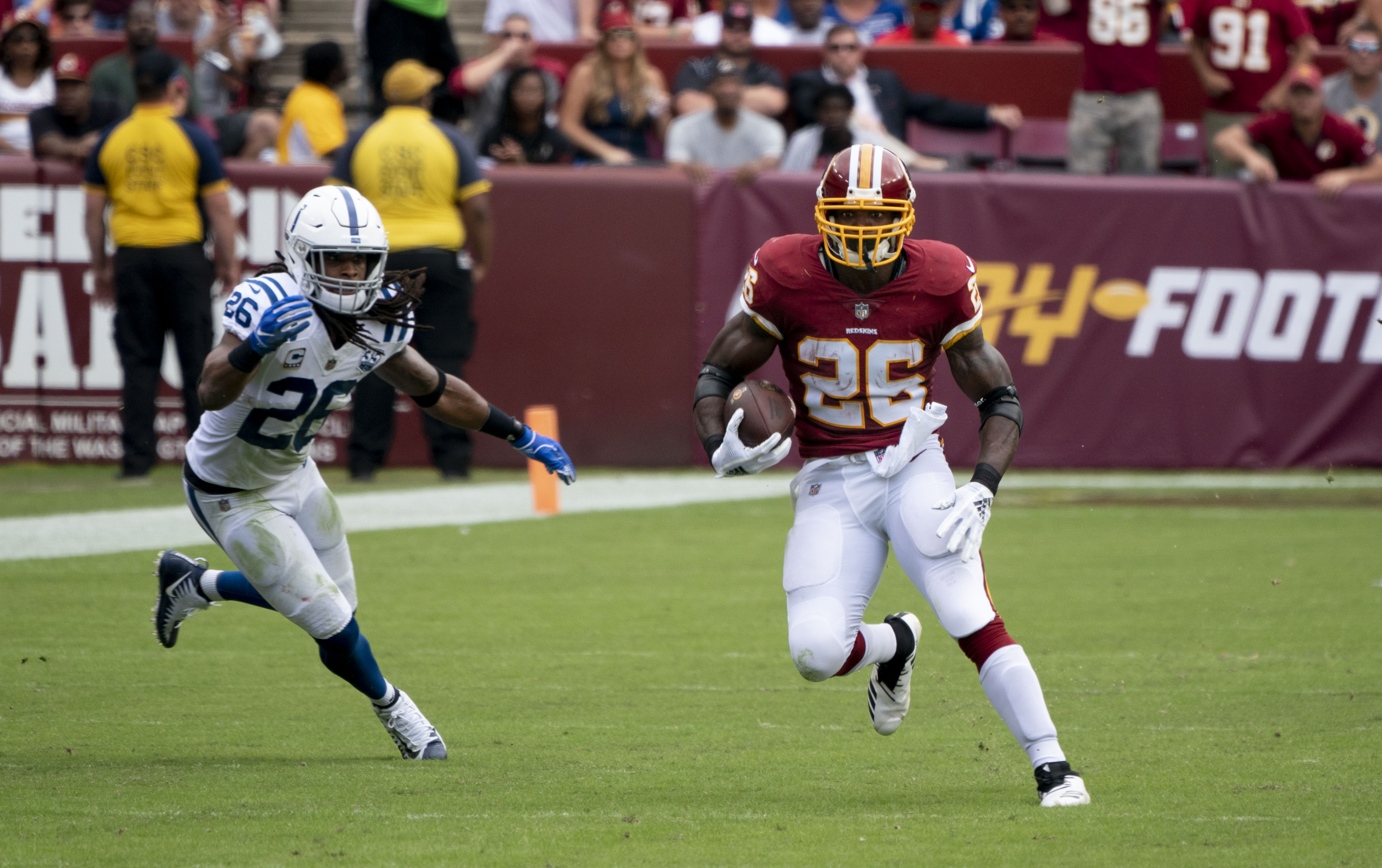
Geathers pursuing Adrian Peterson in a game against the Washington Redskins in 2018.

On January 1, 2018, the Colts fired Pagano after they finished with a 4–12 record in 2017. On February 11, 2018, the Colts announced their decision to hire former Philadelphia Eagles offensive coordinator Frank Reich to be their next head coach. Reich and defensive coordinator Matt Eberflus switched the defense from a base 3-4 defense to a base 4-3 defense. Throughout training camp, Geathers competed against Matthias Farley to be the starting strong safety. He was named the Colts starting strong safety to begin the season.

He started in the Colts' season-opener against the Cincinnati Bengals and recorded seven solo tackles and forced a fumble in their 34–23 loss. On September 23, 2018, Geathers collected 13 combined tackles (11 solo) and deflected a pass during a 20–16 loss at the Philadelphia Eagles in Week 3.

=== 2019 ===
On March 20, 2019, Geathers re-signed with the Colts. In week 3 against the Atlanta Falcons, Geathers intercepted Matt Ryan in the 27-24 win.

=== Tennessee Titans ===
On August 16, 2021, Geathers signed with the Tennessee Titans. He was released on August 29, 2021.

== NFL career statistics ==
Legend
**Bold**	Career high

=== Regular season ===
Year	Team	Games		Tackles					Interceptions					Fumbles			
Year	Team	GP	GS	Cmb	Solo	Ast	Sck	TFL	Int	Yds	TD	Lng	PD	FF	FR	Yds	TD
2015	IND	**15**	2	34	27	7	0.0	0	0	0	0	0	1	0	**1**	**29**	0
2016	IND	9	9	59	50	9	0.0	**2**	0	0	0	0	**5**	**1**	0	0	0
2017	IND	5	1	8	5	3	0.0	0	0	0	0	0	0	0	0	0	0
2018	IND	12	**12**	**89**	**61**	**28**	0.0	1	0	0	0	0	3	**1**	0	0	0
2019	IND	**15**	10	54	40	14	0.0	1	**1**	0	0	0	1	0	0	0	0
		56	34	244	183	61	0.0	4	1	0	0	0	10	2	1	29	0

=== Playoffs ===
Year	Team	Games		Tackles					Interceptions					Fumbles			
Year	Team	GP	GS	Cmb	Solo	Ast	Sck	TFL	Int	Yds	TD	Lng	PD	FF	FR	Yds	TD
2018	IND	**2**	**2**	**20**	**14**	**6**	0.0	0	0	0	0	0	**1**	0	0	0	0
		2	2	20	14	6	0.0	0	0	0	0	0	1	0	0	0	0

== Coaching career ==
In April 2022, Geathers returned to UCF to join Gus Malzahn's coaching staff as assistant director of personnel and defensive backs assistant.

== Personal life ==
Geathers is the nephew of retired NFL defensive end Jumpy Geathers, cousin of Orlando Predators defensive end Jeremy Geathers, free agent defensive end Clifton Geathers, free agent nose tackle Kwame Geathers, former Cincinnati Bengals defensive end Robert Geathers, and former UCF defensive end Jarvis Geathers.
