= Robert Geathers =

American football player (born 1983)

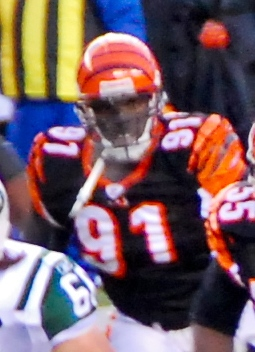
- Geathers with the Cincinnati Bengals in 2010

No. 91
- Position: Defensive end

Personal information
- Born: August 11, 1983 (age 43); Georgetown, South Carolina, U.S.
- Listed height: 6 ft 3 in (1.91 m)
- Listed weight: 280 lb (127 kg)

Career information
- High school: Carvers Bay (Hemingway, South Carolina)
- College: Georgia (2001–2003)
- NFL draft: 2004: 4th round, 117th overall pick

Career history
- Cincinnati Bengals (2004–2014)

Career NFL statistics
- Total tackles: 326
- Sacks: 34.0
- Forced fumbles: 7
- Pass deflections: 20
- Interceptions: 3
- Defensive touchdowns: 2
- Stats at Pro Football Reference

Robert Lee Geathers, Jr. (born August 11, 1983) is an American former professional football player who was a defensive end in the National Football League (NFL). He played college football for the Georgia Bulldogs. He was selected by the Cincinnati Bengals in the fourth round of the 2004 NFL draft.

Geathers played his entire professional career for the Bengals and became a regular starter at defensive end in 2005, his second season in the NFL. With the Bengals, Geathers has been known for making sacks and returning recovered fumbles. Geathers has many family members who played football at the college or professional level; his uncle Jumpy Geathers played in the NFL from 1984 to 1996, and his father Robert Geathers Sr. was a 1981 draft pick. A younger brother Clifton Geathers has played in the NFL since 2010 and another brother Kwame Geathers played for the San Diego Chargers.

In July 2017, Geathers was selected as #48 of the 50 greatest Cincinnati Bengals players in the team's 50-year history.

== Early life ==
Geathers played at Carvers Bay High School and graduated in 2001. As a senior, he recorded 100 tackles and nine sacks on defense and played quarterback on offense. This helped him garner several scholarship offers, and decided to attend the University of Georgia.

== College career ==
At the University of Georgia, Geathers majored in sports studies and began playing on the Georgia Bulldogs football team in 2001 as a true freshman. During his three-year career with Georgia, Geathers started 16 of 39 games and in 2001 was the only true freshman to play all games. Geathers made 81 tackles with five sacks, 10 stops for losses, 22 quarterback pressures, six pass deflections, a fumble recovery, a forced fumble and two interceptions. Declaring for the NFL Draft after his junior year, Geathers was selected in the fourth round (117th overall) of the 2004 NFL draft by Cincinnati.

== Professional career ==
=== Cincinnati Bengals ===
==== 2004 season ====
Pre-draft measurables
Height	Weight	40-yard dash	10-yard split	20-yard split	Vertical jump	Broad jump	Bench press
6 ft 3 in (1.91 m)	271 lb (123 kg)	4.84 s	1.71 s	2.71 s	33 1/2 in (0.85 m)	9 ft 4 in (2.84 m)	24 reps
Times from the NFL Scouting Combine

On April 25, 2004, the Cincinnati Bengals used the team's second fourth-round pick (117th overall) to select Geathers. Geathers debuted with the Bengals on September 26 after sitting out the first two games due to an ankle injury. As a rookie, Geathers primarily played on special teams. He had a career game resulting in a victory on Nov 7 against the Dallas Cowboys with a sack, forced fumble, pass defended, and QB pressure that led to an intentional grounding penalty. Geathers made his first NFL start on November 14, 2004, versus the Washington Redskins. On January 2, 2005, against the Philadelphia Eagles, he intercepted a pass by Jeff Blake and returned it 36 yards for his first career NFL touchdown; that score and extra point put the Bengals up 24–3. Geathers finished the 2004 season with 16 tackles, 4 passes deflected, and 1 interception.

==== 2005 season ====
The following season in 2005, Geathers started all sixteen games and the Bengals' Wild Card playoff game against the Pittsburgh Steelers. Geathers had 33 tackles, 3.0 sacks, and 1 forced fumble in 2005. In the November 6 win over the Baltimore Ravens, Geathers, Anthony Mitchell, and John Thornton combined for 3 sacks. On December 10, Geathers and rookie Odell Thurman combined for a sack of Charlie Frye in the Bengals' 23–20 win over in-state rival Cleveland Browns.

==== 2006 season ====
On September 10, 2006, Geathers made a tackle on a scrambling Kansas City Chiefs quarterback Trent Green on Green's chest and shoulder, and Green had a concussion. There was no penalty on the play. Coach Marvin Lewis maintained that Eddie Kennison might have tried to block Geathers forcing him into Green. Green was on the injured list for almost two months. Geathers was not fined by the NFL for his hit. Geathers finished the 2006 season with 42 tackles and 10.5 sacks. On December 10, Geathers reached 10.5 sacks after making two sacks of Oakland Raiders quarterback Aaron Brooks and became the first Bengals player to make 10 sacks in a season since Alfred Williams in 1992.

On January 11, 2007, the Bengals extended Geathers' contract by six years with a maximum value of $33.7 million.

==== 2007 season ====
Geathers was the Bengals' top sacker with 3.5 sacks in 2007 and also had 47 tackles, 3 passes deflected, 1 interception, and 1 forced fumble. In the September 10 season opener against the Baltimore Ravens, Geathers returned an interception for 30 yards, forced a fumble, and made a sack for 8 yards. In the season, Geathers started all 16 games: 12 as left defensive end and 4 as strongside linebacker.

==== 2008 season ====
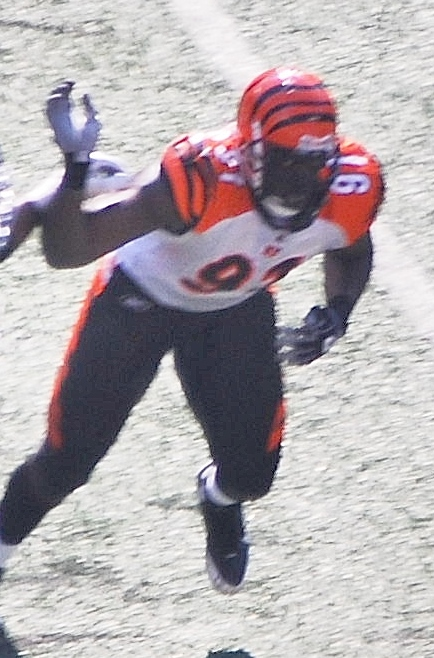
Geathers in 2008

In 2008, Geathers started the first 11 games of the year before injuring his knee on the November 20 game and sat out the rest of the season. He finished the season with 38 tackles, 2.5 sacks, 1 pass deflected, and 1 forced fumble. On November 16, in a tied game against the Philadelphia Eagles, Geathers sacked Donovan McNabb and forced a fumble recovered by Cincinnati; the ensuing drive led to a Shayne Graham field goal.

==== 2009 season ====
In 2009, Geathers led the Bengals in tackles with 36 and made 3.5 sacks, 3 passes deflected, and 1 forced fumble. He started 15 regular season games and the Wild Card game. On September 27, Geathers made an assisted sack of Pittsburgh Steelers quarterback Ben Roethlisberger on third down late in the fourth quarter, forcing a Steelers punt. The Bengals made the game-winning drive afterwards. On October 3 against the Cleveland Browns, Geathers returned a fumble recovery 75 yards for a touchdown. On November 15 against the Steelers, Geathers's sack of Roethlisberger on first-and-goal from the Bengals' 8 held the Steelers to a field goal. Geathers had another fumble recovery on November 21 against the Oakland Raiders and returned the ball 38 yards; the ensuing Bengals drive led to a field goal.

==== 2010 season ====
On September 26, 2010, Geathers's recovery of a Jonathan Stewart fumble and return to the Carolina Panthers' 37-yard line set up a game-clinching touchdown drive for the Bengals. Geathers finished 2010 playing and starting in all 16 games, with 33 tackles, 1 sack, 2 passes deflected, and 1 forced fumble.

==== 2011 season ====
In 2011, Geathers started 13 of 14 games played and made 29 tackles, 2.5 sacks, and 1 pass deflected.

==== 2012 season ====
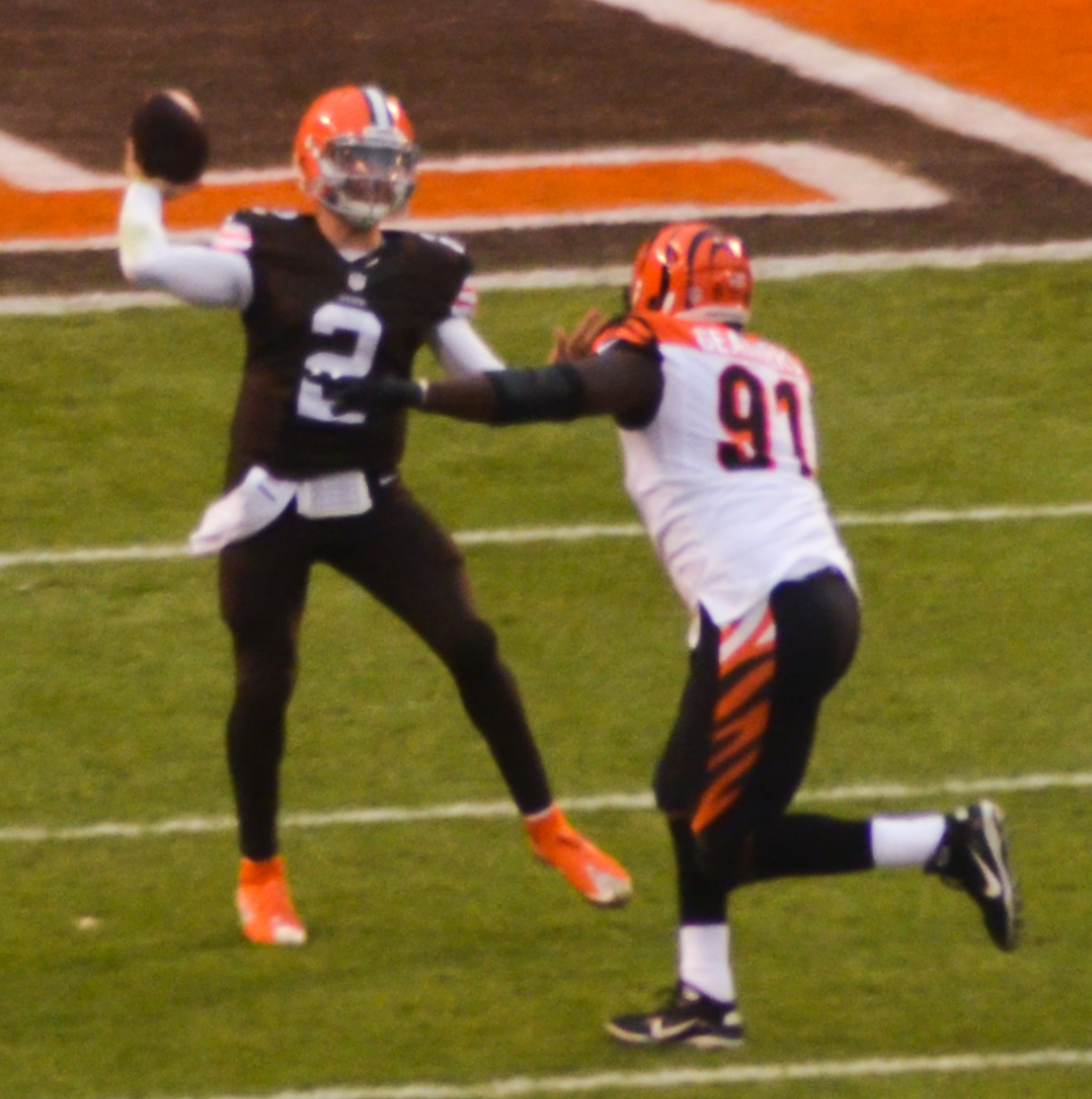
Geathers rushing Johnny Manziel in 2014

In 2012, Geathers became the longest-tenured player on the Bengals roster. That season, he started all 16 games and had 30 tackles.

==== 2015 offseason ====
Geathers was released by the Bengals on February 27, 2015.

== NFL career statistics ==
Legend
	Led the league
**Bold**	Career high

=== Regular season ===
Year	Team	Games		Tackles					Interceptions					Fumbles			
Year	Team	GP	GS	Cmb	Solo	Ast	Sck	TFL	Int	Yds	TD	Lng	PD	FF	FR	Yds	TD
2004	CIN	14	1	16	9	7	3.5	3	**1**	**36**	**1**	**36**	**6**	1	0	0	0
2005	CIN	**16**	**16**	34	25	9	3.0	5	0	0	0	0	1	1	0	0	0
2006	CIN	**16**	0	42	**28**	14	**10.5**	**13**	0	0	0	0	0	0	0	0	0
2007	CIN	**16**	**16**	**47**	25	**22**	3.5	4	**1**	30	0	30	3	**2**	1	0	0
2008	CIN	11	11	38	22	16	2.5	6	0	0	0	0	1	1	1	0	0
2009	CIN	15	15	36	21	15	3.5	4	0	0	0	0	3	1	**2**	**113**	**1**
2010	CIN	**16**	**16**	33	22	11	1.0	1	0	0	0	0	2	1	1	5	0
2011	CIN	14	13	29	10	19	2.5	3	0	0	0	0	1	0	0	0	0
2012	CIN	**16**	**16**	30	12	18	3.0	3	0	0	0	0	0	0	0	0	0
2013	CIN	2	0	0	0	0	0.0	0	0	0	0	0	0	0	0	0	0
2014	CIN	**16**	0	21	10	11	1.0	2	**1**	2	0	2	3	0	0	0	0
		152	104	326	184	142	34.0	44	3	68	1	36	20	7	5	118	1

=== Playoffs ===
Year	Team	Games		Tackles					Interceptions					Fumbles			
Year	Team	GP	GS	Cmb	Solo	Ast	Sck	TFL	Int	Yds	TD	Lng	PD	FF	FR	Yds	TD
2005	CIN	**1**	**1**	2	**2**	0	0.0	**1**	0	0	0	0	**1**	0	0	0	0
2009	CIN	**1**	**1**	3	1	**2**	0.0	0	0	0	0	0	0	0	0	0	0
2011	CIN	**1**	**1**	3	**2**	1	0.0	0	0	0	0	0	0	0	0	0	0
2012	CIN	**1**	**1**	**4**	**2**	**2**	0.0	0	0	0	0	0	0	0	0	0	0
2014	CIN	**1**	0	0	0	0	0.0	0	0	0	0	0	0	0	0	0	0
		5	4	12	7	5	0.0	1	0	0	0	0	1	0	0	0	0

== Family ==
Geathers comes from a line of football athletes. He is the son of Robert and Debra Geathers. Robert Sr. was a standout defensive lineman at South Carolina State and was a third round draft choice in the 1981 NFL draft, but an injury ended his career. His uncle James "Jumpy" Geathers played at Wichita State University and then in the NFL, recording 62 sacks and two Super Bowl wins in a 13-year career (1984–96 with New Orleans, Washington (Super Bowl XXVI), Atlanta, and Denver (Super Bowl XXXIII).

His brother Clifton Geathers played for the University of South Carolina and was drafted by the Cleveland Browns in the 6th round of the 2010 NFL draft. His other brother Kwame Geathers is a former nose tackle for the San Diego Chargers. His cousin Clayton Geathers played defensive back for the Indianapolis Colts. His other cousin, Carlton Geathers, is a center on the University of South Carolina basketball team.
