= Clifton Geathers =

American football player (born 1987)

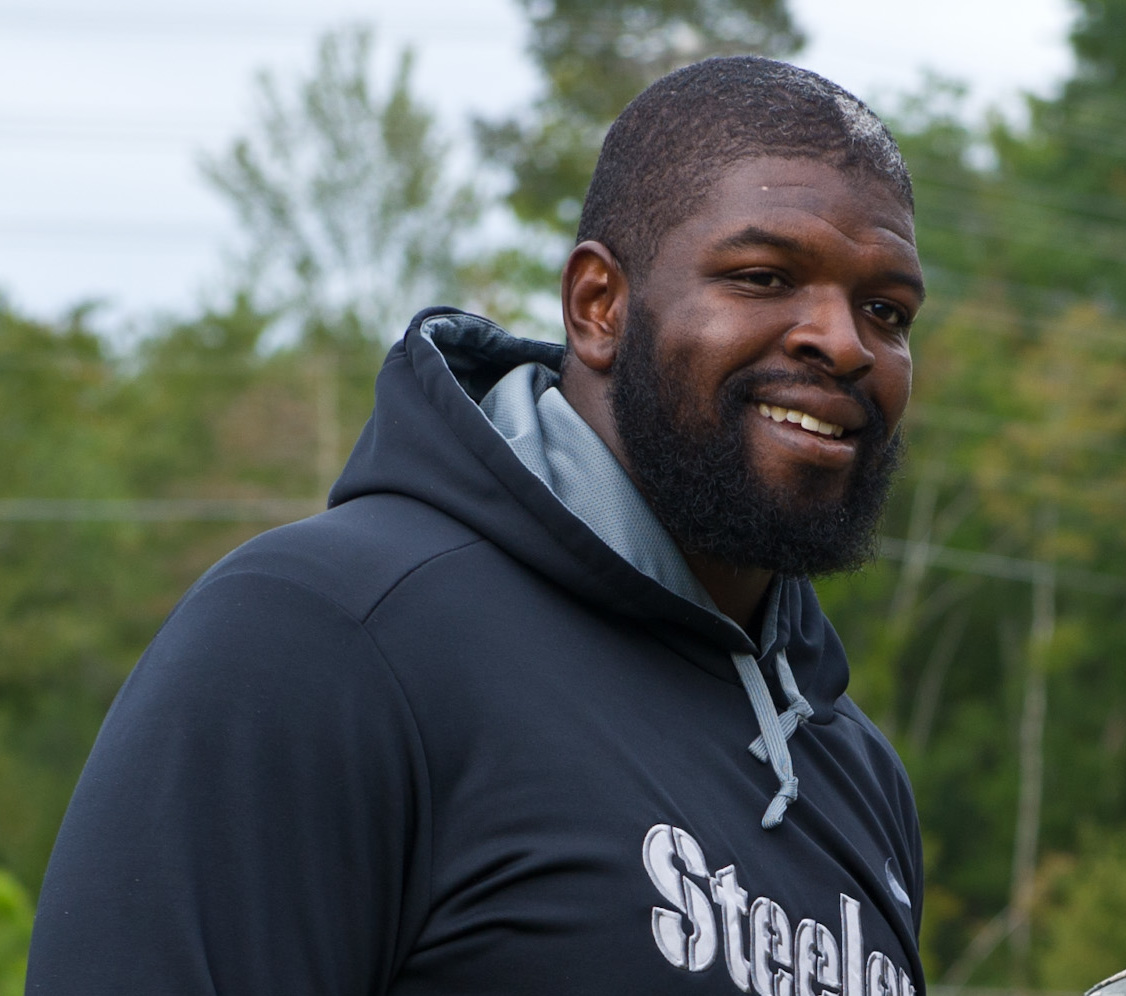
- Geathers in 2015

No. 62, 66, 96, 90, 94
- Position: Defensive end

Personal information
- Born: December 11, 1987 (age 38); Georgetown, South Carolina, U.S.
- Listed height: 6 ft 8 in (2.03 m)
- Listed weight: 281 lb (127 kg)

Career information
- High school: Carvers Bay (Hemingway, South Carolina)
- College: South Carolina
- NFL draft: 2010: 6th round, 186th overall pick

Career history
- Cleveland Browns (2010)*; Miami Dolphins (2010); Seattle Seahawks (2010); Dallas Cowboys (2010–2011); Indianapolis Colts (2012); Philadelphia Eagles (2013); Washington Redskins (2014); Pittsburgh Steelers (2014–2015)
- * Offseason or practice squad member only

Career NFL statistics
- Total tackles: 24
- Sacks: 1.0
- Stats at Pro Football Reference

Clifton Geathers (born December 11, 1987) is an American former professional football player who was a defensive end in the National Football League (NFL) for the Miami Dolphins, Dallas Cowboys, Indianapolis Colts, Philadelphia Eagles, and Washington Redskins. He was selected by the Cleveland Browns in the sixth round of the 2010 NFL draft. He played college football for the South Carolina Gamecocks.

== Early life ==
Geathers attended Carvers Bay High School in Hemingway, South Carolina. He enrolled at Hargrave Military Academy as a senior.

Although he originally intended to join the University of Georgia, he decommitted and accepted instead a football scholarship from the University of South Carolina. As a freshman, he was a backup defensive tackle, tallying 2 tackles in one game against South Carolina State University. He did not play in the season finale against Clemson University.

As a sophomore, he appeared in 13 games (one start) and recorded 29 tackles (17 solo). His first career start came against the University of Alabama at Birmingham, where he had 5 tackles (one for loss) and one quarterback hurry.

As a junior, he appeared in 12 games, posting 41 tackles (8.5 for loss), 3.5 sacks, 2 forced fumbles and one fumble recovery. He declared for the NFL draft before his senior season. He finished his college career with 36 games, 72 tackles (12 tackles for loss), 6 sacks, 2 forced fumbles and one fumble recovery.

== Professional career ==
Pre-draft measurables
Height	Weight	Arm length	Hand span	40-yard dash	10-yard split	20-yard split	20-yard shuttle	Three-cone drill	Vertical jump	Broad jump	Bench press
6 ft 7 1/2 in (2.02 m)	299 lb (136 kg)	37 3/4 in (0.96 m)	11 1/8 in (0.28 m)	4.98 s	1.75 s	2.90 s	4.72 s	7.20 s	36.0 in (0.91 m)	9 ft 4 in (2.84 m)	26 reps
All values from NFL Combine/Pro Day.

=== Cleveland Browns ===
Geathers was selected by the Cleveland Browns in the sixth round (186th overall) of the 2010 NFL draft. He was released on September 4.

=== Miami Dolphins ===
On September 5, 2010, Geathers was awarded to the Miami Dolphins on waiver claims. On November 26, he was waived to make room for Chris Baker.

=== Seattle Seahawks ===
On November 27, 2010, Geathers was claimed off waivers by the Seattle Seahawks. He was released on December 7.

=== Dallas Cowboys ===
On December 8, 2010, he was claimed off waivers by the Dallas Cowboys. He appeared in one game and was declared inactive for three others.

In 2011, he played in five games as a backup defensive tackle, making 2 tackles and 3 quarterback pressures. He was released on August 31, 2012.

=== Indianapolis Colts ===
On October 3, 2012, Geathers was signed to the Indianapolis Colts practice squad. He would replace former Baylor nose tackle Nicolas Jean-Baptiste. He would spend 4 days total on Indianapolis' practice squad before being elevated to the active roster due to an injury to Colts' defensive end, Fili Moala. He recorded a sack against the Houston Texans on December 30. He had five tackles and his first career sack during the season.

=== Philadelphia Eagles ===
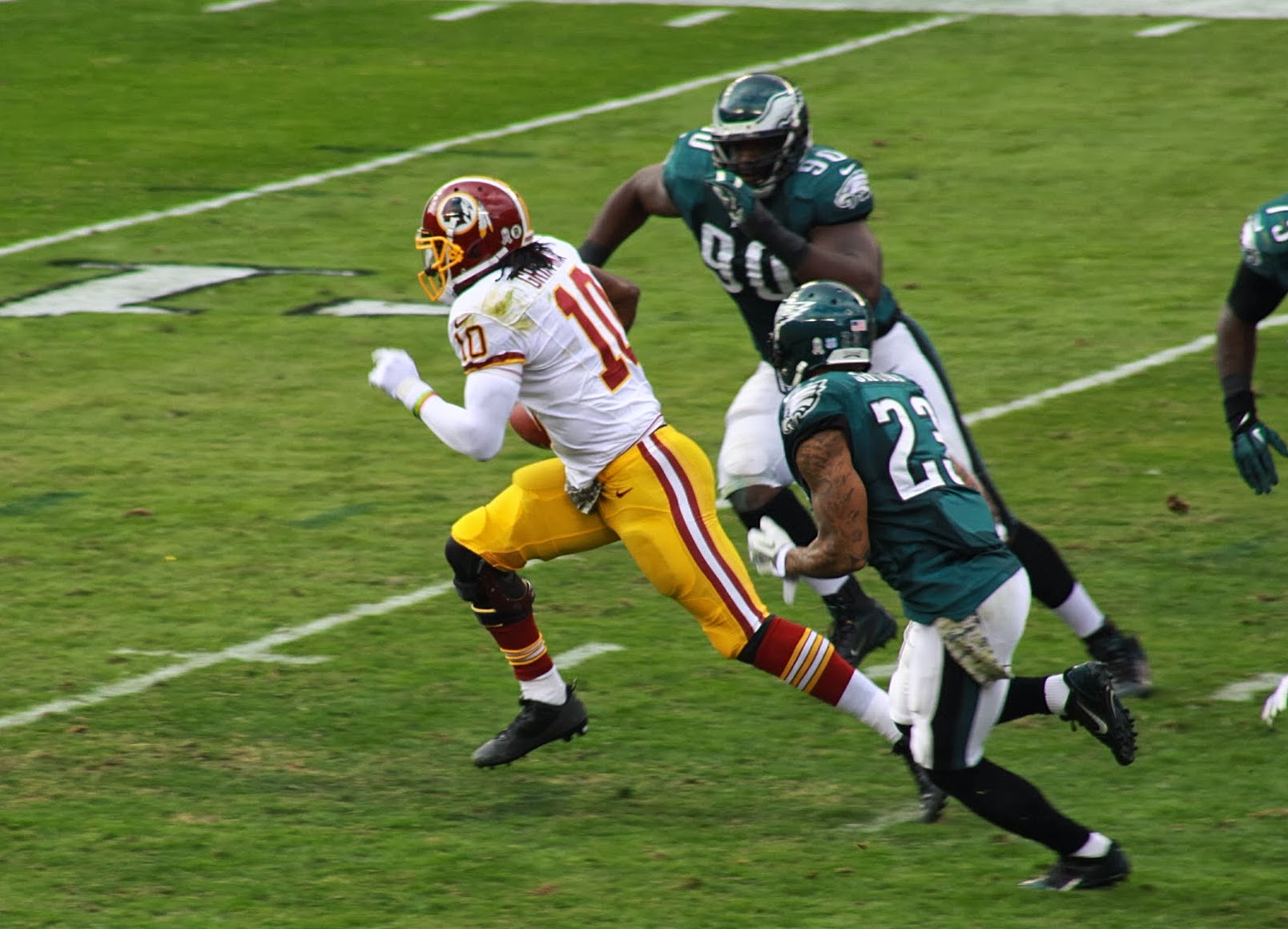
Geathers (#90 on right) pursuing Robert Griffin III in 2013.

On March 28, 2013, the Philadelphia Eagles traded fullback Stanley Havili in exchange for Geathers. He played in 16 games for the first time in his career. He wasn't re-signed after the season.

=== Washington Redskins ===
On March 13, 2014, Geathers signed as an unrestricted free agent with the Washington Redskins. He appeared in six games and made 6 tackles. He was released on November 1, 2014.

=== Pittsburgh Steelers ===
On December 1, 2014, he signed a one-year contract with the Pittsburgh Steelers as a free agent, following an injury to Brett Keisel. He was a game-day inactive for each of the 5 (4 regular season and 1 postseason) games he was on the Steelers roster.

Geathers signed another one-year contract with the Steelers on April 1, 2015. On August 7, he was placed on season-ending injured reserve.

== Personal life ==
His brother Robert Geathers Jr., was a defensive end for the Cincinnati Bengals. His uncle, Jumpy Geathers, played defensive end in the NFL. Clifton's father, Robert Geathers Sr., was a third-round pick in the 1981 NFL draft, but an injury ended his career. His younger brother, Kwame Geathers, played college football at The University of Georgia and was a nose tackle for the Cincinnati Bengals. His cousin Clayton Geathers plays defensive back for the Indianapolis Colts.
