= Kwame Geathers =

American football player (born 1990)

No. 76, 95
- Position: Nose tackle

Personal information
- Born: October 4, 1990 (age 36); Georgetown, South Carolina, U.S.
- Listed height: 6 ft 6 in (1.98 m)
- Listed weight: 335 lb (152 kg)

Career information
- High school: Carvers Bay (Hemingway, South Carolina)
- College: Georgia
- NFL draft: 2013: undrafted

Career history
- San Diego Chargers (2013–2014); Cincinnati Bengals (2014–2015)*
- * Offseason or practice squad member only

Career NFL statistics
- Total tackles: 4
- Stats at Pro Football Reference

Kwame Geathers (born October 4, 1990) is an American former professional football player who was a nose tackle in the National Football League (NFL). He played college football for the Georgia Bulldogs.

== College career ==
Geathers entered the 2013 NFL draft after his junior season.

== Professional career ==
=== 2013 NFL draft ===
Pre-draft measurables
Height	Weight	Arm length	Hand span	40-yard dash	20-yard shuttle	Three-cone drill	Vertical jump	Broad jump
6 ft 5 3/8 in (1.97 m)	342 lb (155 kg)	35 1/2 in (0.90 m)	9 1/2 in (0.24 m)	5.44 s	5.27 s	8.11 s	26 1/2 in (0.67 m)	8 ft 0 in (2.44 m)
All values from NFL Combine

=== San Diego Chargers ===
Geathers was signed by the San Diego Chargers on May 13, 2013. He was waived by the Chargers on December 2, 2014.

=== Cincinnati Bengals ===
On December 12, 2014, Geathers was signed to the Cincinnati Bengals' practice squad. On August 31, 2015, he was released by the Bengals.

== Personal life ==
Geathers brothers Robert and Clifton play in the NFL. His father Robert Geathers, Sr., uncle Jumpy Geathers and cousin Jeremy Geathers also played in the NFL.
