= John Stamper (American football) =

American football player (born 1978)

No. 95
- Position: Defensive end

Personal information
- Born: August 30, 1978 (age 48); Andrews, South Carolina, U.S.
- Listed height: 6 ft 4 in (1.93 m)
- Listed weight: 265 lb (120 kg)

Career information
- High school: Andrews
- College: South Carolina
- NFL draft: 2002: 6th round, 193rd overall pick

Career history
- Tampa Bay Buccaneers (2002)*; Chicago Bears (2002)
- * Offseason or practice squad member only
- Stats at Pro Football Reference

John Stamper (born August 30, 1978) is an American former professional football player who was a defensive end for the Chicago Bears of the National Football League (NFL) in 2002. He was selected in the sixth round of the 2002 NFL draft by the Tampa Bay Buccaneers with the 193rd overall pick. He played college football for the South Carolina Gamecocks. In his lone season in the NFL, he appeared in four games in the 2002 season.
