= Carvers Bay High School =

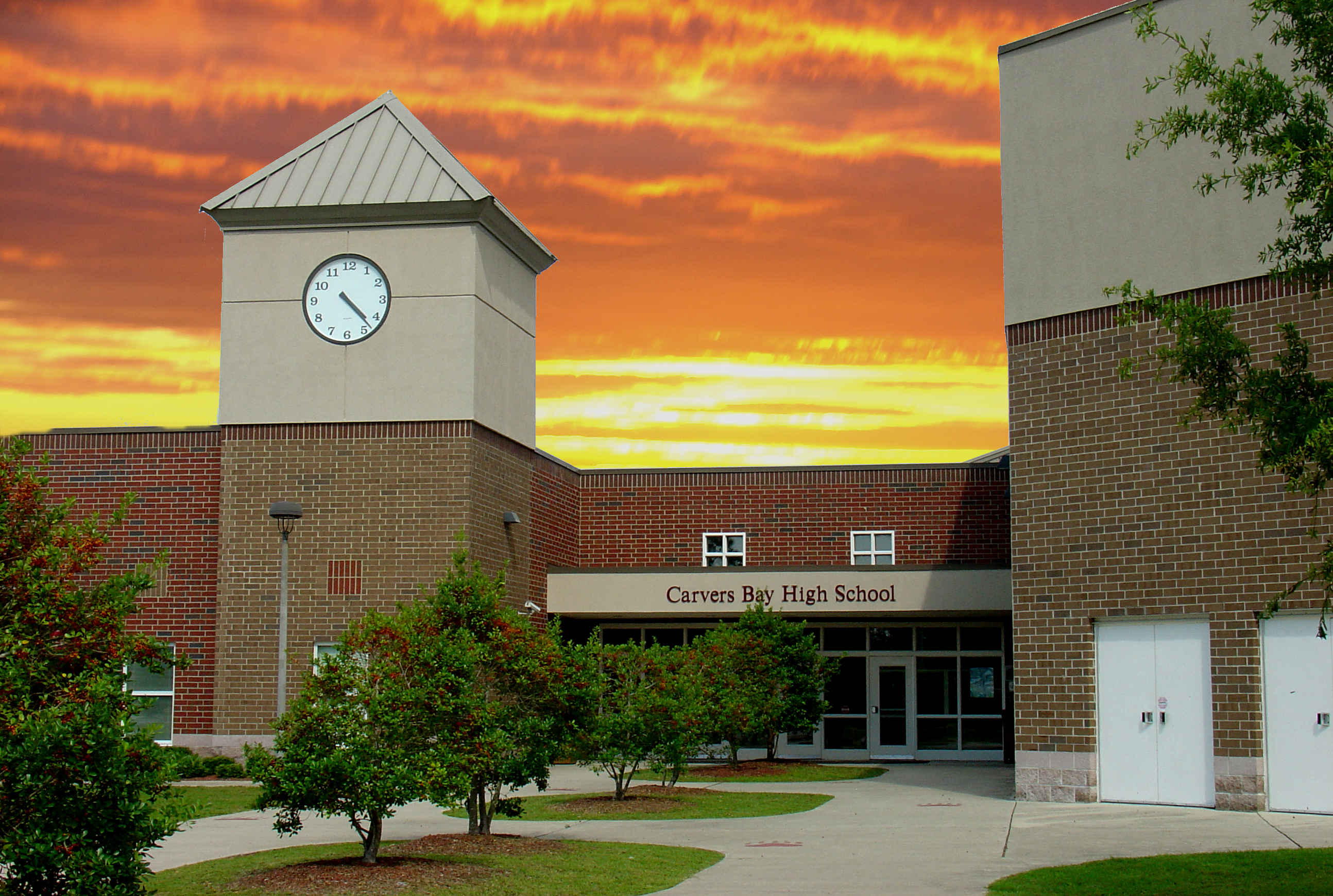
- Photo by Mr. Sorensen

Location
- 13002 Choppee Road; Hemingway, Georgetown County, South Carolina 29554; United States; 33°36′43″N 79°19′38″W

Information
- Type: Public high school
- School district: Georgetown County School District
- Principal: Vacant
- Faculty: 90
- Teaching staff: 40.50 (FTE)
- Grades: 9–12
- Enrollment: 382 (2023-2024)
- Student to teacher ratio: 9.43
- Colors: Cardinal red and Vegas gold
- Mascot: Bear
- Website: https://www.gcsd.k12.sc.us/o/cbhs/

Carvers Bay High School is a public high school in Hemingway, South Carolina serving students from parts of Georgetown County, South Carolina, United States. It is in the Georgetown County School District and has grades 9 to 12 . The school was established from a merger between Choppee High School and Pleasant Hill High School and opened in 2000. In 2000 it enrolled nearly 800 students. It serves students from the towns of Pleasant Hill, Plantersville, Hemingway, Lanes Creek, Dunbar, Oatland, St. Luke, Pee Dee, Choppee and Browns Ferry.

== Middle school ==
Carvers Bay Middle School is located on the same campus, in a separate building.

== Notable alumni ==
- Clifton Geathers — National Football League (NFL) player, Philadelphia Eagles
- Kwame Geathers — NFL player, San Diego Chargers
- Robert Geathers — NFL player, Cincinnati Bengals
- Clayton Geathers — NFL player, Indianapolis Colts
- Tyrell Richard — US Track runner and medalist
- Melissa Jefferson-Wooden (sprinter) — Olympic gold and bronze medalist
- Byron Young — NFL player, Los Angeles Rams
