= Celeste Beatty =

First Black woman to own a brewery in the United States

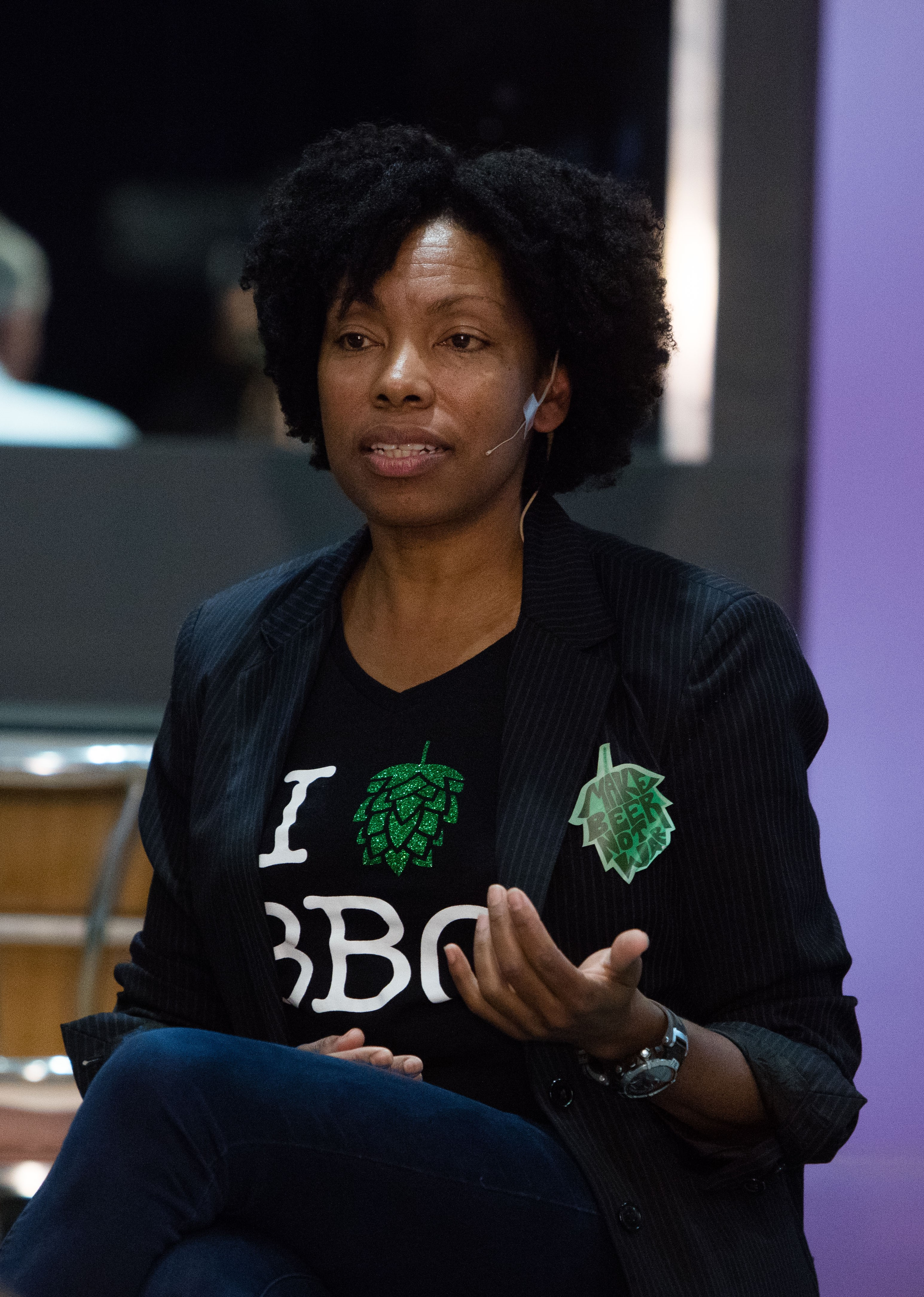
- Beatty speaking at Smithsonian Food History Weekend in 2017
- Born: Winston-Salem, North Carolina
- Education: Shaw University
- Occupation: Brewer
- Known for: First Black woman to own a brewery in the United States

Celeste Beatty (born 1964) is the first Black woman to own a brewery in the United States. She established her brewery, Harlem Brewing Company, in 2000.

== Personal life ==
Beatty was born in 1964 in Winston-Salem, North Carolina. She graduated from Shaw University in 1984 with a degree in International Relations. Beatty was interested in studying at Shaw in part because the Student Nonviolent Coordinating Committee, a civil rights organization, had been founded there. Some of Beatty's family members had moved from North Carolina to Harlem during the 1950s and 60s, and in the early 1990s she followed in their footsteps, moving to Harlem. Beatty has a son, Khouri, who was born around 1982.

== Career ==
Beatty first started working in the non-profit sector for organizations that ran homeless shelters and worked with artists. However, after experimenting in the 1990s with a homebrewing kit that she had received as a gift and teaching homebrewing classes in her home, Beatty's interest in brewing turned professional. Beatty was also influenced by her interactions with Ben Cohen and Jerry Greenfield, founders of Ben & Jerry's ice cream company. Beatty helped operate Ben & Jerry's first partner shop in Harlem at the intersection of 125th St. and 5th Ave, which opened in July 1992. The ice cream shop was operated in partnership with Harlem Ark of Freedom, a non-profit organization that operated a shelter for men experiencing homelessness, some of whom worked as employees at the ice cream shop. Beatty cited her experiences working there as inspirational in understanding how small businesses could engage the communities around them.

Beatty founded her brewery, Harlem Brewing Co., in November 2000. Beatty had the support of Sylvia Woods, founder and owner of Sylvia's Restaurant, who helped Beatty promote Harlem Brewing Co. in her restaurants.

Beatty has cited the histories of the Harlem neighborhood and West African brewing techniques and ingredients as influences in developing her beers. Harlem Brewing Co.'s beers include Harlem Sugar Hill Golden Ale, inspired by Duke Ellington's song Take the 'A' Train [to Sugar Hill]; Harlem Renaissance Wit, flavored with cumin, grains of paradise, orange peel, and coriander; 125th Street IPA, an India Pale Ale named in honor of one of Harlem's most iconic avenues; and Queen Stout, a stout flavored with coffee, chocolate, and cinnamon, brewed in honor of Beatty's mother, Rachel Patterson Beatty Jackson.

In 2006, Anheuser-Busch offered to acquire Harlem Brewing Co., but Beatty declined. Harlem Brewing Co.'s beers are sold in Whole Foods, Walmart, and Fairway Market and distributed in New York, Virginia, and North Carolina. Beatty's "Renaissance Wit" won the "Best Brew of New York City" in a 2018 competition.

Beatty has collaborated with Black brewers across the country. In 2018, Beatty partnered with Briana Brake, founder and head brewer of Spaceway Brewing Company, LLC, to open Rocky Mount Brewery in Rocky Mount, North Carolina. Briana serves as the head brewer and CEO, while Beatty is the Co-Brewer and Adviser. In 2021, Harlem Brewing Co. collaborated with Montclair Brewery, a Black-owned brewery in Montclair, New Jersey, to create a porter called "Noble Like It Is" in honor of Gil Noble, a Black journalist who was born in Harlem to Jamaican immigrant parents and lived in Montclair. Brewers chose a porter style because porters and stouts are favored by Jamaican beer drinkers and they flavored the beer with Jamaican pimento (allspice).

In 2020, Celeste Beatty and her brothers Carl Beatty and Pernell Beatty incorporated Harlem Brew South, a brewery, taproom, and training center in a former tobacco warehouse located in Rocky Mount, North Carolina. The team plans to open the facility in 2023.

In 2021, Beatty was featured in the documentary film One Pint at a Time, which also featured Alisa Bowens-Mercado, Teri Fahrendorf, and others.

Beatty is also a member of the New York State Brewers Association, the Brewers Association, and the New York City Brewers Guild.
