= Andrews High School =

Andrews High School may refer to:

== In the United States ==
- Andrews High School (North Carolina), Andrews, North Carolina
- Andrews High School (South Carolina), Andrews, South Carolina
- Andrews High School (Texas), Andrews, Texas
- T. Wingate Andrews High School, High Point, North Carolina
