= Waccamaw High School =

Coordinates: 33.4537792°N 79.1447658°W

Location
- 2412 Kings River Road; Pawleys Island, South Carolina 29585; United States

Information
- Type: Public
- Established: 1990 (36 years ago)
- Oversight: Georgetown County School District
- Principal: David Hammel
- Teaching staff: 59.00 (FTE)
- Grades: 9–12
- Enrollment: 846 (2023–2024)
- Student to teacher ratio: 14.34
- Colors: Red, black, and white
- Mascot: Warrior
- Rival
- Website: www.gcsd.k12.sc.us/o/whs

Waccamaw High School (WHS) is one of four schools that are encompassed in the Waccamaw school family on the Waccamaw Neck of Georgetown County, South Carolina. Opening in 1990, it was a school that consisted of grades 7–11, with its first senior class being the class of 1992. In 1996, the first group of students who helped open the school as 7th grade middle schoolers graduated.

== Academics and ratings ==
Waccamaw High School has generally strong academic performance relative to other public high schools in South Carolina. According to Niche, the school has a B overall academic grade, with approximately 52% of students proficient in math and 90% proficient in reading on state assessments. The school also reports an average graduation rate of about 94% and standardized test results including an average SAT score around 1180 and an average ACT score of 26. AP participation is around 24% with multiple AP courses offered.

School ranking data indicate Waccamaw High School ranks within the top 20% of public high schools in South Carolina based on combined math and reading proficiency testing data. Math proficiency at the school exceeds the state average, and reading proficiency is notably higher than the state average as well. The student–teacher ratio is about 14:1, roughly in line with the state average.

According to , Waccamaw High consistently maintains a high star rating and typically outperforms district and state averages on end‑of‑course assessments in subjects such as Algebra I, English I, and U.S. History.

The school also contributed to improvements in its district’s overall state report card ratings, with the Georgetown County School District showing positive performance trends in recent state evaluations.

== Sports ==
- Swimming
- Baseball
- Basketball
- Cheerleading
- Cross Country
- Football
- Golf
- Lacrosse
- Marching Band
- Soccer
- Softball
- Tennis
- Track and Field
- Volleyball
- Wrestling
- Dance
- Sailing
