= Georgetown High School =

Georgetown High School may refer to:

- Georgetown High School (Delaware) in Georgetown, Delaware
- Georgetown High School (Louisiana) in Georgetown, Louisiana
- Georgetown High School (Massachusetts) in Georgetown, Massachusetts
- Georgetown Junior/Senior High School in Georgetown, Ohio
- Georgetown High School (South Carolina) in Georgetown, South Carolina
- Georgetown High School (Texas) in Georgetown, Texas
- Georgetown High School (Pietermaritzburg) in Pietermaritzburg, South Africa
