= Robert F. Swinnie Airport =

- IATA: ADR; ICAO: KPHH; FAA LID: PHH

Summary
- Airport type: Public
- Owner: Georgetown County
- Location: Andrews, South Carolina
- Elevation AMSL: 26 ft / 8 m
- Coordinates: 33°27′06″N 079°31′34″W

Map

Runways
Direction	Length		Surface
Direction	ft	m	Surface
18/36	3,001	915	Asphalt

Statistics (2006)
- Aircraft operations: 1,000
- Source: Federal Aviation Administration

Robert F. Swinnie Airport (IATA: ADR, ICAO: KPHH, FAA LID: PHH) is a public airport located two miles (3 km) east of the central business district of Andrews, a town in Georgetown County, South Carolina, United States. It is owned by Georgetown County. The airport serves the general aviation community, with no scheduled commercial airline service.

Although most U.S. airports use the same three-letter location identifier for the FAA and IATA, Robert F. Swinnie Airport is assigned PHH by the FAA and ADR by the IATA.

== Facilities and aircraft ==
Robert F. Swinnie Airport covers an area of 92 acres (37 ha) which contains one asphalt paved runway (18/36) measuring 3,001 feet (915 m) by 60 feet (18 m). For the 12-month period ending 9 October 2019, the airport had 4,000 aircraft operations, 100% of which were general aviation. The airport served as the base for 7 single-engine aircraft and one ultra-light vehicle.

== See also ==
- List of airports in South Carolina
