= Jeremy Geathers =

American gridiron football player (1986–2017)

No. 6
- Position: Defensive end

Personal information
- Born: June 19, 1986; New Orleans, Louisiana, U.S.
- Died: February 11, 2017 (aged 30); Las Vegas, Nevada, U.S.
- Listed height: 6 ft 2 in (1.88 m)
- Listed weight: 256 lb (116 kg)

Career information
- High school: Andrews (SC)
- College: UNLV
- NFL draft: 2008: undrafted

Career history
- New Orleans Saints (2008); Spokane Shock (2010); BC Lions (2010); Chicago Rush (2011); Spokane Shock (2012); BC Lions (2012)*; Toronto Argonauts (2012); Spokane Shock (2013–2014); Orlando Predators (2015)
- * Offseason or practice squad member only

Awards and highlights
- ArenaBowl champion (2010); ArenaBowl Defensive Player of the Game (2010); Second-team All-MW (2006)

Career AFL statistics
- Total tackles: 72.5
- Sacks: 18
- Forced fumbles: 5
- Stats at ArenaFan.com
- Stats at CFL.ca (archive)

Jeremy James Geathers (June 19, 1986 – February 11, 2017) was an American professional football player. He was signed by the New Orleans Saints of the National Football League (NFL) as an undrafted free agent in 2008. He played college football at Nevada-Las Vegas.

== Early life ==
Geathers attended Andrews High School in Andrews, South Carolina.

== College career ==
After his high school graduation, Geathers attended Butler Community College in El Dorado, Kansas. While at Butler, Geathers was a member of the Grizzlies football team.

Geathers spent two seasons playing for the UNLV Rebels before forgoing his final season of eligibility to enter the 2008 NFL draft.

== Professional career ==
=== Return to the Shock ===
Geathers returned to the Shock in 2013 and 2014.

=== Orlando Predators ===
On October 27, 2014, Geathers was assigned to the Orlando Predators.

== Death ==
Geathers was killed as he tried to cross a street and was struck by a limousine driver on February 11, 2017, in Las Vegas. Geathers was reportedly not at an intersection or marked crosswalk when the incident occurred.
