= Alisa Bowens-Mercado =

American brewery owner

Alisa Bowens-Mercado is the founder and owner of the first Black-woman owned brewery in Connecticut - Rhythm Brewing Co. As of June 2022, Bownes-Mercado's brewery is also the only Black-woman-owned brewery in Connecticut.

Before entering the brewery business, Bowens-Mercado worked at her family business dealing with construction work. She worked in the construction business for 12 years before pivoting in 2000 to open her own dance studio - Alisa’s House of Salsa - in Westville.

Bowens-Mercado founded Rhythm Brewing Co. in 2018. Rhythm Brewing Co.'s supporters are colloquially known as "The Rhythm Nation."

In 2021, Bowens-Mercado was featured in the documentary film One Pint at a Time, which also featured Celeste Beatty, Teri Fahrendorf, Jon Renthrope, Huston Lett and others. She also partnered with Samuel Adams on a sparkling lager called "Up Tempo" in February 2021. Along with 43 other women-owned businesses, Bowens-Mercado received grant money from the Women's Business Development Council's Equity Match Grant Program in April 2021. She used the grant money to go toward creating a new tap room. On June 15, 2021, Bowens-Mercado was a speaker at an event hosted by the New Haven Museum and Historical Society titled “Founders Chat: The Rhythm of Work,” that was also hosted in partnership with the 2021 International Festival of Arts & Ideas. In August of that same year, the New Haven Museum and Historical Society displayed donated items from Alisa Bowens-Mercado relating to both her Salsa studio and Brewery.

In March 2022, Bowens-Mercado partnered with Joy Braddock of Hog River Brewing Co. and Heather Wilson of Hop Culture Farms & Brew Co. to create Bombshell IPA, whose proceeds will go to the CT Pink Boots Society Scholarship for Women in Brewing, which was established in 2021 to increase opportunities for women interested in pursuing a career in brewing at Sacred Heart University.

In 2022, Bowens-Mercado and her brewery was named as one of the five finalists for the annual Samuel Adams Brewer Experienceship, which is a national mentorship program for brewing entrepreneurs that started in 2012.
