= Pleasant Hill Consolidated School =

- U.S. National Register of Historic Places
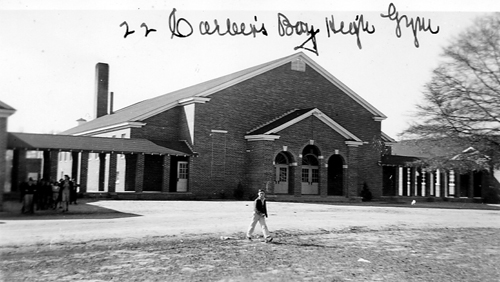

- Location within South Carolina Location within the United States
- Location: 11957 Pleasant Hill Dr., near Hemingway, South Carolina
- Coordinates: 33°40′44″N 79°22′07″W
- Area: 10.6 acres (4.3 ha)
- Built: 1938
- Architectural style: Late 19th And 20th Century Revivals
- NRHP reference No.: 98000421
- Added to NRHP: April 30, 1998

Pleasant Hill Consolidated School, also known as Pleasant Hill Middle School and Carvers Bay School, is a historic school complex located near Hemingway, Georgetown County, South Carolina. It was built about 1938, and consists of three one-story brick buildings connected by two covered walkways. The three buildings were the grammar school, auditorium/gymnasium (central block), and high school. Both schools are U-shaped. The cannery and home economics/farm-shop buildings are located behind the high school.

It was listed on the National Register of Historic Places in 1998.
