= Sylvia Woods =

American restaurateur

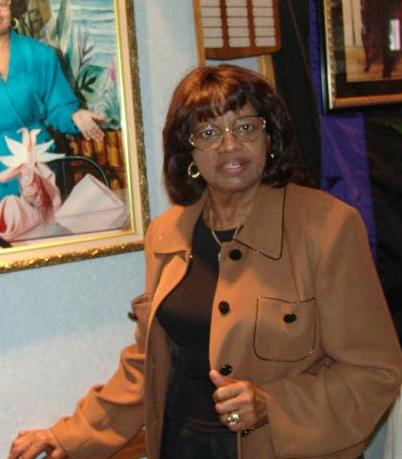
- Woods in 2009
- Born: Sylvia Pressley; February 2, 1926; Hemingway, South Carolina
- Died: July 19, 2012 (aged 86); Mount Vernon, New York
- Spouse: Herbert Woods (1944–2001) his death
- Culinary career
- Cooking style: Soul food
- Current restaurant
- Sylvia's

Sylvia Woods (February 2, 1926 – July 19, 2012) was an American restaurateur who founded the restaurant Sylvia's in Harlem on Lenox Avenue, New York City with her husband, Herbert Woods, in 1962. The soul food eatery is a popular gathering place for Harlem residents and tourists not far from the Apollo Theater.

== Life ==
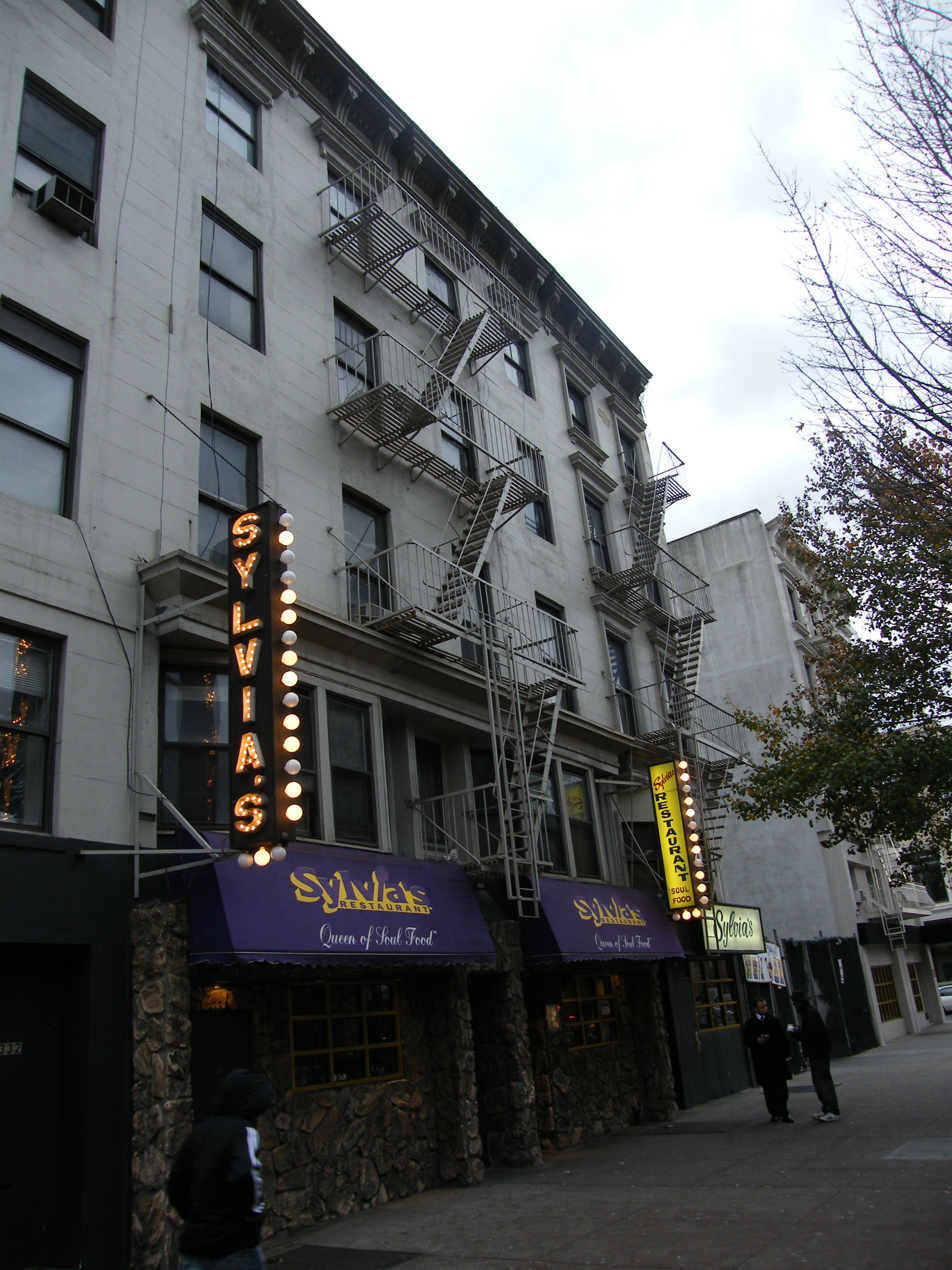
Sylvia's Restaurant

Sylvia was born to Julia and Van Pressley in Hemingway, South Carolina. Her father, Van Pressley, died when she was just three days old from complications of injuries he received during combat in World War I. By April 10, 1930, she had lived in Williamsburg County, South Carolina, with her grandmother Sylvia Johnson, the woman she was named after. Johnson had worked as a farmer, a trade that Pressley would get into when she got a little older. In 1930, Sylvia's mother took the rest of her family to New York so she could better provide for her family, leaving her grandmother, Sylvia Johnson to raise three-year-old Sylvia.

Woods met her future husband, Herbert, in a bean field when she was 11 years old and he was 12. They married in 1944 after he followed her to New York. They had four children together: Van, Bedelia, Kenneth, and Crizette. Woods graduated from high school in her hometown of Hemingway, South Carolina. She trained to become a beautician in New York, and also ran a beauty shop in South Carolina. Woods also worked in a hat factory, and as a waitress at a restaurant called Johnson's Luncheonette in Harlem from 1954 to 1962.

Woods worked at Johnson's for about seven or eight years. When the owner wanted to sell, he offered the place to Woods for $20,000.

During the early 1990s, the business expanded and now seats up to 450 people. It also has a catering business. Organized and started by her son Van in 1992, Sylvia came out with her own line of soul food products that are sold nationally. Woods' products include many of her special sauces, vegetables, spices, syrup, and cornbread and pancake mixes. Woods produced two cookbooks: Sylvia’s Soul Food Cookbook, published in 1992; and Sylvia’s Family Soul Food Cookbook, published in 1999, both by William Morrow and Company. While Sylvia's was a popular neighborhood restaurant, it was not until New York magazine's food critic Gael Grene wrote a 1979 article naming Woods "the queen of soul food" that the business gained worldwide attention. The restaurant remains owned and operated by the Woods family. In August 2011, they celebrated 50 years in Harlem. Guests have included Quincy Jones, Diana Ross, Muhammad Ali, Bill Clinton, Robert F. Kennedy, and President Barack Obama.

Sylvia Woods stepped down from the day-to-day operations of the restaurant when she was 80 years old. Sylvia's is currently owned and operated by her children and grandchildren. Her husband Herbert predeceased her, dying in 2001.

Woods died on July 19, 2012, at her home in Mount Vernon, New York, at the age of 86. She had suffered from Alzheimer's disease for several years.

In 2014, the corner of W.126th Street and Lenox Avenue in Harlem was co-named "Sylvia P. Woods Way."

== Awards and recognition ==
Due to the immense popularity of her soul-food staples, Woods was known as "the Queen of Soul Food." Spike Lee used Sylvia's restaurant as a location for his 1991 film Jungle Fever.

New York Mayor Michael R. Bloomberg was due to present Woods with an award at a celebration of the 50th anniversary of Sylvia's Restaurant shortly after she died; a family friend accepted it on her behalf.

Former President of the United States Bill Clinton was one of many who spoke in her memory at a two-hour-long memorial on July 24, 2012.

== Bibliography ==
- Sylvia’s Soul Food: Recipes From Harlem’s World Famous Restaurant, with Christopher Styler (1992, William Morrow and Company)
- Sylvia’s Family Soul Food Cookbook: From Hemingway, South Carolina, to Harlem, with Melissa Clark (1999, William Morrow and Company)
