= Choppee Creek =

Stream in South Carolina, United States

Coordinates: 33.5479°N 79.3584°W

Choppee Creek is a stream in the U.S. state of South Carolina.

According to tradition, Choppee Creek is named after an Indian tribe. A variant name is "Chopper Creek".
