= Choppee, South Carolina =

Settlement in South Carolina, United States

Coordinates: 33°34′17″N 79°22′58″W

Choppee is an unincorporated community in Georgetown County, in the U.S. state of South Carolina.

== History ==
The community was named for its location on Choppee Creek.
