= Georgetown County School District =

School district in South Carolina, United States

Location
- Georgetown, South Carolina United States

District information
- Superintendent: Dr. Bethany Giles

Other information
- Website: https://www.gcsd.k12.sc.us/

Georgetown County School District is a school district serving Georgetown County, South Carolina, United States. It is based in Georgetown, South Carolina. Dr. Bethany Giles has been the superintendent since 2024.

== Schools ==
=== Elementary schools ===
- Andrews Elementary School
- Brown's Ferry Elementary School for the Creative and Performing Arts
- Coastal Montessori Charter School
- Kensington Elementary School
- Maryville Elementary School
- McDonald Elementary School
- Plantersville Digital Immersion School
- Pleasant Hill Elementary STREAM Academy
- Sampit Elementary School
- Waccamaw Elementary School
- Waccamaw Intermediate School

=== Middle schools ===
- Carvers Bay Middle STEAM Academy
- Georgetown Middle School
- Rosemary Middle School
- Waccamaw Middle School

=== High schools ===
- Andrews High School
- Carvers Bay Early College & Career High School
- Georgetown High School
- Waccamaw High School

=== Adult education ===
- Howard Adult Center

=== Historic Schools ===
- Choppee High School
- Howard High School
- Winyah High School
- J.B. Beck Middle School
