= Andrews, South Carolina =

Andrews
- Town
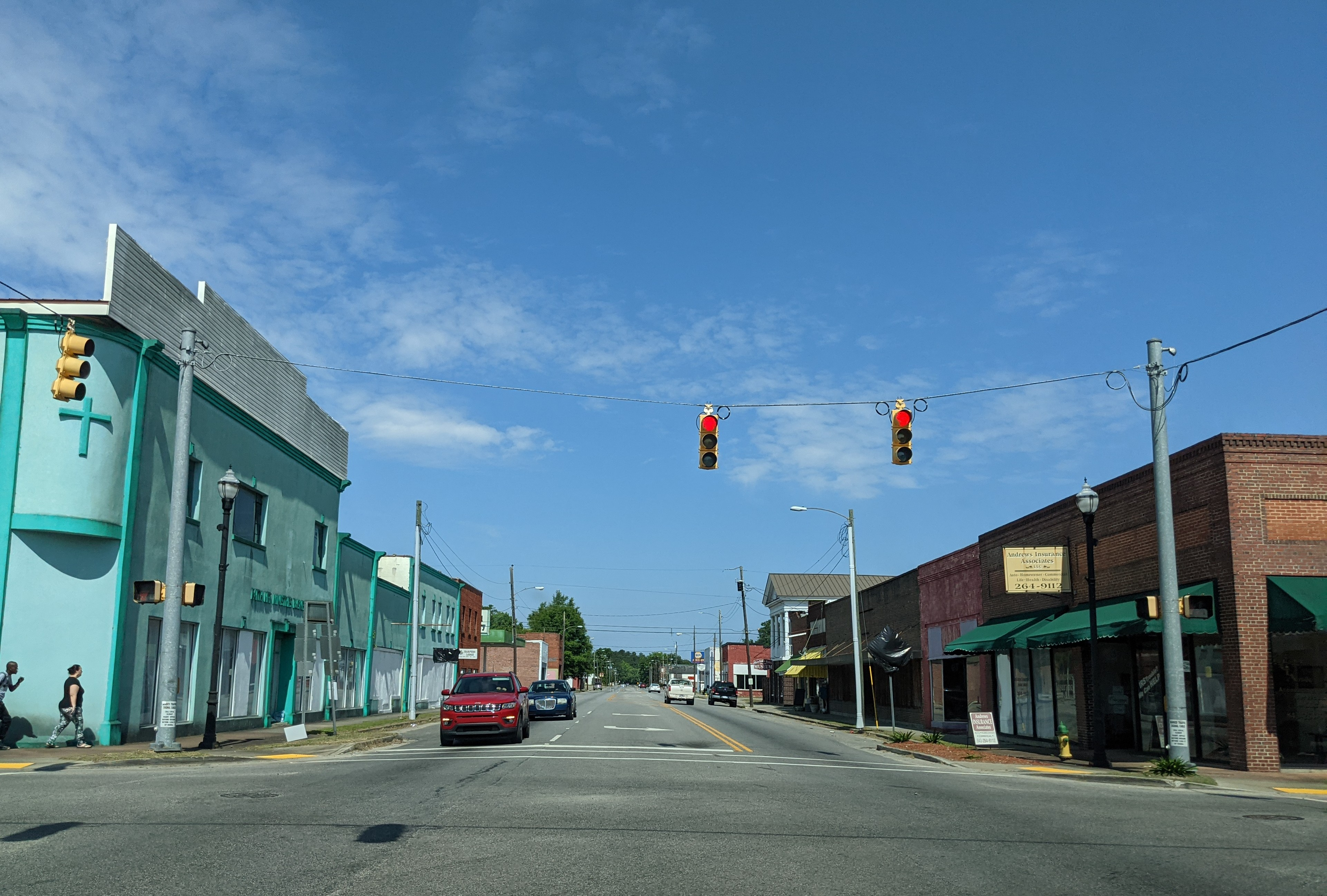
- Downtown Andrews, SC

- Location in Georgetown County and the state of South Carolina.
- Coordinates: 33°26′58″N 79°33′58″W
- Country: United States
- State: South Carolina
- Counties: Georgetown, Williamsburg

Area
  - Total: 2.21 sq mi (5.73 km^{2})
  - Land: 2.21 sq mi (5.73 km^{2})
  - Water: 0 sq mi (0.00 km^{2})
- Elevation: 33 ft (10 m)

Population (2020)
  - Total: 2,575
  - Density: 1,164.9/sq mi (449.77/km^{2})
- Time zone: UTC-5 (EST)
  - Summer (DST): UTC-4 (EDT)
- ZIP code: 29510
- Area codes: 843, 854
- FIPS code: 45-01450
- GNIS feature ID: 2405150
- Website: www.townofandrews.sc.gov

Andrews is a town in both Georgetown and Williamsburg counties in the U.S. state of South Carolina. Its total population was 2,575 at the 2020 census, down from 2,861 in 2010. General aviation airfield Robert F. Swinnie Airport is 2 miles (3 km) east of its central business district.

== Geography ==
Andrews is located in western Georgetown County, with a small portion extending west into Williamsburg County. U.S. Route 521 bypasses the town to the south, then passes through the west side of the town; the highway leads northwest 62 miles (100 km) to Sumter and east 17 miles (27 km) to Georgetown, the county seat. South Carolina Highway 41 leads northeast 24 miles (39 km) to Hemingway and southwest 15 miles (24 km) to Jamestown. Charleston is 59 miles (95 km) to the southwest.

According to the United States Census Bureau, Andrews has a total area of 2.2 square miles (5.7 km^{2}), all land.

== Demographics ==
Historical population
Census	Pop.	Note	%±
1920	1,968		—
1930	1,712		−13.0%
1940	2,008		17.3%
1950	2,702		34.6%
1960	2,995		10.8%
1970	2,839		−5.2%
1980	3,129		10.2%
1990	3,050		−2.5%
2000	3,068		0.6%
2010	2,861		−6.7%
2020	2,575		−10.0%
U.S. Decennial Census

=== 2020 census ===
Andrews racial composition
Race	Num.	Perc.
White (non-Hispanic)	811	31.5%
Black or African American (non-Hispanic)	1,609	62.49%
Native American	7	0.27%
Asian	5	0.19%
Pacific Islander	1	0.04%
Other/Mixed	60	2.33%
Hispanic or Latino	82	3.18%

As of the 2020 United States census, there were 2,575 people, 1,049 households, and 754 families residing in the town.

=== 2000 census ===
As of the census of 2000, there were 3,068 people, 1,182 households, and 843 families residing in the town. The population density was 1,392.6 inhabitants per square mile (537.7/km^{2}). There were 1,347 housing units at an average density of 611.4 per square mile (236.1/km^{2}). The racial makeup of the town was 60.76% African American, 37.55% White, 0.23% Native American, 0.88% from other races, and 0.59% from two or more races. Hispanic or Latino of any race were 1.43% of the population.

There were 1,182 households, out of which 35.5% had children under the age of 18 living with them, 40.2% were married couples living together, 26.4% had a female householder with no husband present, and 28.6% were non-families. 26.3% of all households were made up of individuals, and 11.6% had someone living alone who was 65 years of age or older. The average household size was 2.60 and the average family size was 3.12.

In the town, the population was spread out, with 30.5% under the age of 18, 8.8% from 18 to 24, 25.3% from 25 to 44, 22.1% from 45 to 64, and 13.3% who were 65 years of age or older. The median age was 35 years. For every 100 females, there were 77.8 males. For every 100 females age 18 and over, there were 73.3 males.

The median income for a household in the town was $19,375, and the median income for a family was $22,750. Males had a median income of $24,891 versus $17,344 for females. The per capita income for the town was $12,105. About 30.8% of families and 34.2% of the population were below the poverty line, including 45.8% of those under age 18 and 21.4% of those age 65 or over.

== History ==
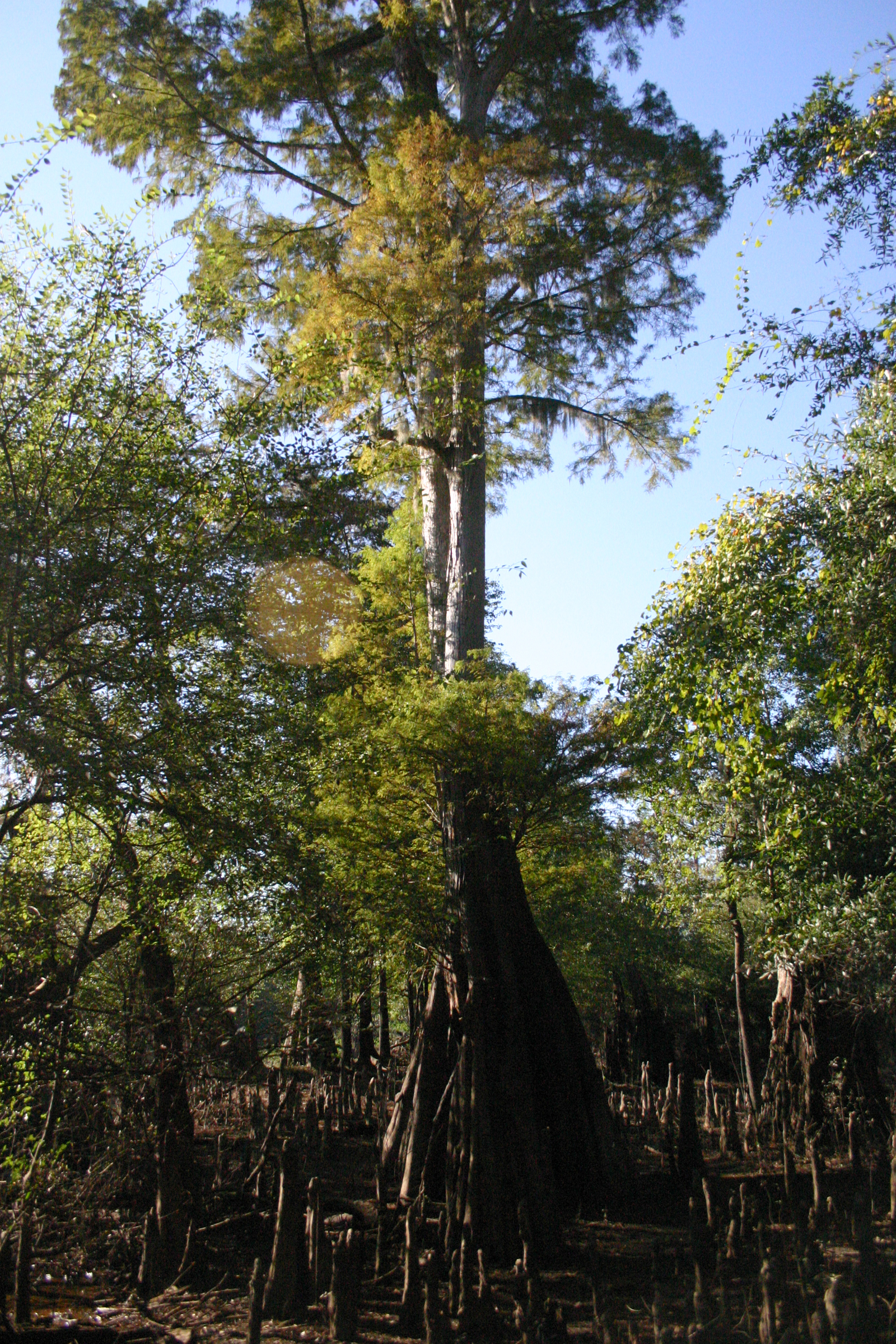
A grand old bald cypress tree in the Santee River valley near Andrews

The towns of Rosemary and Harpers Crossroads were settled along the Georgetown and Western Railroad, which started operation in 1886. In 1905, the Seaboard Air Line Railroad built a route through the town, along with a sizable maintenance shop. In 1909, voters agreed to incorporate the two separate towns into a single community, which was named Andrews, after Colonel Walter H. Andrews, who played an important role in the incorporation. Andrews worked for the Atlantic Coast Lumber Co. and served as mayor through most of the 1920s. In 1915, a town hall was built, which is now a museum. By 1919, Andrews had reached a population of 2,000 and continued to grow. During the 1920s, Andrews had the title of being the fastest growing town in the United States for its age. The two schools were the Andrews School and the Rosemary School. These were segregated, with the Andrews School being the white school and Rosemary being the black.

When the Great Depression of the 1930s started, Andrews was hit hard, with population down by 700 when Seaboard scaled back its operations. In 1932, the local economy was dealt a further blow when the Atlantic Coast Lumber Co. closed its nearby plant. The lumber business never regained prominence in the area. The economy subsequently improved in the late 1930s when an International Paper paper mill was built in Georgetown County.

After World War II, the Andrews Development Board was incorporated to attract businesses to the area. Among the industries added were Brooks Veneer Co., the Beale and the Ingram lumber companies, the Rogers Saw Mill Co., the Hardee livestock market, the Andrews Ice Co., and the Oneita Knitting Mill. In 1970, the schools were integrated. Rosemary became a middle school. The Andrews school became the elementary/high school. In 1984, Andrews Elementary School was built. In 2000, new middle and high school facilities were built. An expansion to the local branch library began in 2010. It celebrated its centennial year in 2009.

== Education ==
Public education in Andrews is administered by Georgetown County School District. The district operates Andrews Elementary School (child development-5th), Rosemary Middle School (6th-8th), and Andrews High School (9th-12th).

Trinity Christian Academy is a private institution.

Andrews has a public library, a branch of the Georgetown County Library.

== Notable people ==
- Chris Rock
- Chubby Checker
