= Sylvia's Restaurant of Harlem =

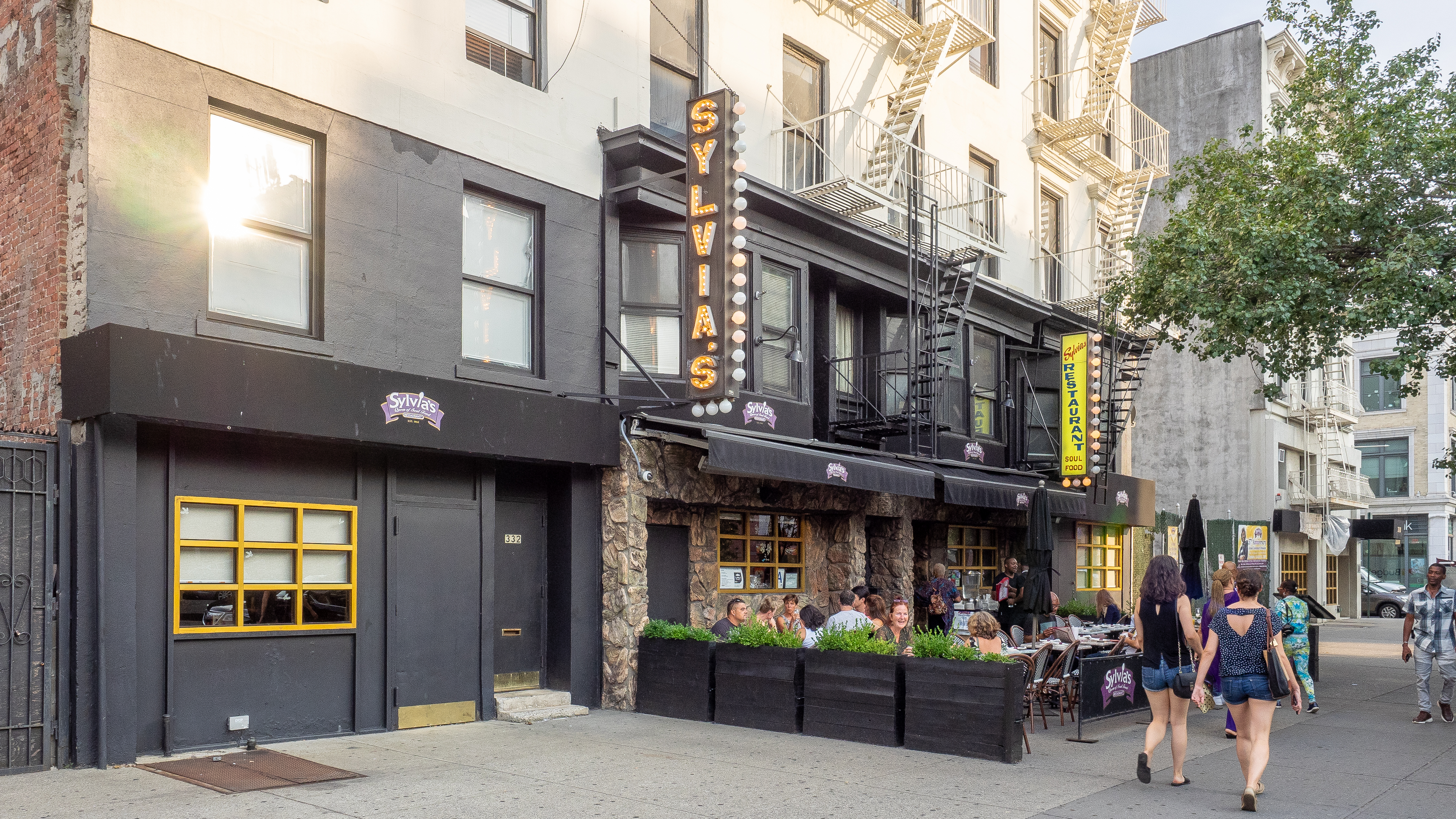
- Interactive map of Sylvia's Restaurant of Harlem

Restaurant information
- Established: 1962
- Food type: Soul food, Southern
- Location: 328 Malcolm X Boulevard, New York City, New York, 10027
- Coordinates: 40.808718°N 73.944538°W
- Website: sylviasrestaurant.com

Sylvia's Restaurant of Harlem, often called Sylvia's Soul Food or just Sylvia's, is a soul food restaurant located at 328 Malcolm X Boulevard, between 126th and 127th Streets, in Harlem, Manhattan, New York City. Founded in 1962 by Sylvia Woods, it sells a line of prepared foods, beauty and skin care items, cookbooks, and a children's book written by Woods. The restaurant attracts a clientele that ranges from Harlem locals to visiting celebrities.

== History ==
Sylvia's Restaurant of Harlem was founded as a soul food restaurant located at 328 Malcolm X Boulevard, between 126th and 127th Streets, in Harlem in 1962 by Sylvia Woods.

It has since expanded to a much larger space at its present location, and an adjacent building. The restaurant also sells a line of prepared foods, beauty and skin care items, cookbooks, and a children's book written by Woods. Woods purchased the original luncheonette by borrowing money from her mother, who had to mortgage her farm to provide it; Woods repaid the loan a year after opening. Since opening, the restaurant has remained within the family, and as of 2021 is owned by Sylvia's son, Kenneth Woods, and managed by Sylvia's grandson, CEO K. De’Sean Woods.

Staff of the restaurant (pictured sometime prior to 2006).

The restaurant attracts a clientele that ranges from Harlem locals to visiting celebrities. Whoopi Goldberg, Bill Clinton, Nelson Mandela, Caroline Kennedy, Jesse Jackson, Al Sharpton, Magic Johnson, Barack Obama, Bernie Sanders and Bruno Mars are among those who have dined there. Sylvia's was also featured on a Manhattan-themed episode of the Travel Channel's Man v. Food in early 2009. On September 19, 2007, commentator Bill O'Reilly received criticism regarding comments he made on his syndicated radio show, about having lunch at Sylvia's with Al Sharpton. O'Reilly concluded that stereotypes regarding African Americans were not true based on observations he had made at the restaurant.

In response to the COVID-19 pandemic, Sylvia's Restaurant participated in relief efforts by donating meals to Harlem Hospital. Sylvia’s also operated a food pantry donating over 1,000 meals a week to those in need. The restaurant announced plans to open a pop-up pantry featuring meal kits to serve the community.

== See also ==
- List of restaurants in New York City
- List of soul food restaurants
