= Georgetown High School (South Carolina) =

Location
- 2500 Anthuan Maybank Drive; Georgetown, South Carolina 29440; United States; 33.386724°N 79.30259°W

Information
- Type: Public high school
- Established: 1983 (43 years ago)
- School district: Georgetown County School District
- Principal: Taylor Hering
- Staff: 75.40 (FTE)
- Grades: 9–12
- Enrollment: 918 (2025-2026)
- Student to teacher ratio: 12.16
- Colors: Navy and gray
- Mascot: Bulldog
- Website: www.gcsd.k12.sc.us/o/ghs/

Georgetown High School is a public high school located in Georgetown, South Carolina, United States. It is one of four high schools in the Georgetown County School District.

== Academics and ratings ==
Georgetown High School’s academic performance relative to other public high schools in South Carolina is mixed. According to Niche, the school has a C overall academic grade, with approximately 27% of students proficient in math and 80% proficient in reading based on state assessment results. The average graduation rate is about 79%, and standardized test scores include an average SAT score of 1050 and an average ACT score of 22.

School ranking data from Public School Review indicate that Georgetown High School ranks within the top 50% of public high schools in South Carolina based on combined math and reading proficiency testing data. Reading proficiency at the school is above the state average, while math proficiency is slightly below the state average.

Georgetown High School offers seven Advanced Placement courses:

- AB Calculus
- Biology
- Human Geography
- Macroeconomics
- US Government & Politics
- US History
- World History

== Athletics ==
Georgetown High School offers baseball, basketball, cheerleading, cross country, football, golf, soccer, softball, swimming, tennis, track and field, volleyball, and wrestling.
