= Jumpy Geathers =

American football player (born 1960)

No. 97, 79
- Positions: Defensive tackle, defensive end

Personal information
- Born: June 26, 1960 (age 66); Georgetown, South Carolina, U.S.
- Listed height: 6 ft 7 in (2.01 m)
- Listed weight: 290 lb (132 kg)

Career information
- High school: Choppee (SC)
- College: Wichita State
- NFL draft: 1984: 2nd round, 42nd overall pick

Career history
- New Orleans Saints (1984–1989); Washington Redskins (1990–1992); Atlanta Falcons (1993–1995); Denver Broncos (1996–1997)

Awards and highlights
- 2× Super Bowl champion (XXVI, XXXII)

Career NFL statistics
- Total tackles: 273
- Sacks: 62
- Forced fumbles: 5
- Fumble recoveries: 9
- Stats at Pro Football Reference

James Allen "Jumpy" Geathers (born June 26, 1960) is an American former professional football player who was a defensive tackle in the National Football League (NFL). At the time of his retirement, he was the only active player who played at Wichita State University, which discontinued its football program following the 1986 season, making him the last WSU football player to play in the NFL. Geathers was selected by the New Orleans Saints with the 42nd overall selection in the second round of the 1984 NFL draft.

== Career ==
He played defensive tackle at Wichita State, and then for 13 seasons in the NFL (New Orleans Saints 1984–1989, Washington Redskins 1990–1993, Atlanta Falcons 1994–1995, and Denver Broncos 1996). He was a part of the Redskins team that won Super Bowl XXVI. At 6 feet 7 inches (2.01 m) and 290 pounds (130 kg) he was a forceful pass rusher, famous for his "forklift" rush, in which he picked up his blocker and carried him to the quarterback. Despite bad knees later in his career, Geathers played well into his 30s. Geathers' career was cut short when he ruptured his Achilles tendon during training camp with the Denver Broncos and spent the 1997 season on injured reserve, the same year the Broncos would go on to win the Super Bowl for the first time in franchise history. He retired with 62 sacks in 183 games. Geathers attended Choppee High School located in Georgetown, South Carolina.
