= Andrews High School (South Carolina) =

Location
- 12890 County Line Road; Andrews, South Carolina 29510; United States; 33°27′33″N 79°34′20″W

Information
- Type: Public
- Established: 1922 (104 years ago)
- Oversight: Georgetown County School District
- Principal: Kevin Branham
- Staff: 48.20 (FTE)
- Grades: 9–12
- Enrollment: 509 (2023-2024)
- Student to teacher ratio: 10.56
- Colors: Gold and black
- Nickname: Yellow Jackets
- Website: www.gcsd.k12.sc.us/o/ahs/

Andrews High School (AHS) is a secondary school located in Andrews, South Carolina, United States. It is the oldest continually serving school in Georgetown County. It was established in 1922 with grades 7–11 on a campus on Farr Avenue. In 1963, the campus was moved to Alder Street a few blocks away. It remained there for 47 years before being moved to its current location on County Line Road. In the ninth grade, the school employs the Freshman Academy system.

== History ==
=== Establishment ===
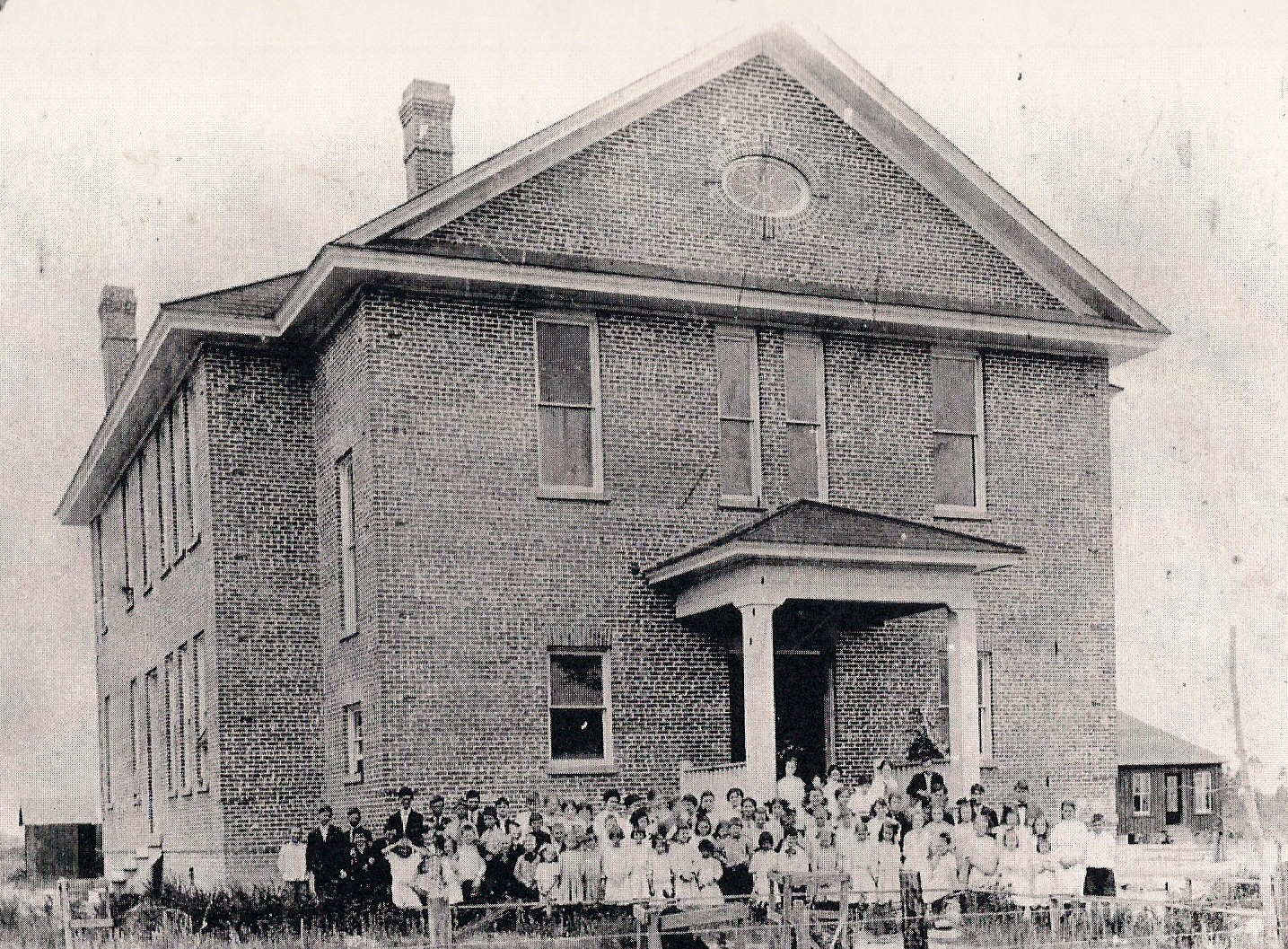
1911 school building

The first school in Andrews opened in 1911 and was located on Morgan Avenue. One student graduated from the school in the spring of 1912. In 1922, the first Andrews High School building opened. In 1939, the first gym for Andrews High School was built alongside the Farr Avenue building. In the mid-1950s, a cafeteria was built facing Morgan Avenue. This building continues to be used today as the Town Hall.

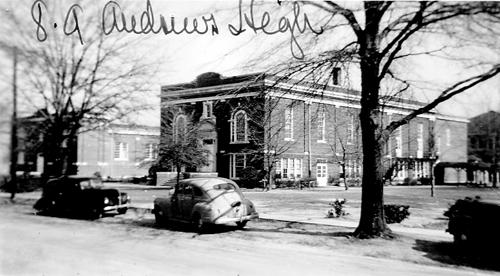
The 1922 main high school building on the right, with the 1939 gym on the left

When the school moved out in the mid-1960s, the main high school building and the grammar school building were torn down, leaving the gym and the cafeteria. The gym continued to be used by the rec department until 2009, when the building was torn down due to disrepair and lack of funds for upkeep.

=== First relocation ===
The second campus was located on Alder Street.

In 1964, tragedy struck Andrews when the principal for 40 years, J.E. Millard, died in October. Andrews Superintendent C.C. Garris filled in for the remainder of the school year, at which point he retired. In 1965, a new principal, Mr Highsmith, was appointed and served until 1970, when Webber Rowell, the head coach, became principal. He was principal until 1988.

When integration came to Andrews in 1970, the middle school grades (4–8) were moved to the former Rosemary High School, now Rosemary Middle School. The elementary school grades (K–3) remained at the Andrews High campus until 1984, when Andrews Elementary School was built on County Line Road.

The high school moved out of the Alder Street campus in 2001 to the current campus on County Line Road. The gym on the campus and sport fields are used by the rec department. The remainder of the campus (except the shop, which will become the EMS station) was torn down in 2011 to make way for a central park and community center.

=== Current campus ===
The campus is on County Line Road. The school was moved there in 2001 under the guidance of Rene King. In 2004, King gave over the reins to Michelle Staggers, his assistant principal.

In 2011, the Andrews Schools celebrated their 100th anniversary, and the schools celebrated their 100th graduating class in 2013 (there was no graduating class in 1930).

=== Athletics ===
Andrews High School offers the following sports to students:

Sports offered at Andrews High School
| Boys | Girls |
|---|---|
| Football | Volleyball |
| Basketball | Basketball |
| Baseball | Softball |
| Golf | Track and Field |
| Track and Field | |

=== Principals of Andrews High School ===
- J.E. Millard: 1924–1964 (died while principal)
- C.C. Garris: 1964–1965 (interim)
- William V. Highsmith: 1965–1970
- Webber Rowell: 1970–1988
- Albert Hayward: 1988–1989
- Terry Cash: 1989–1993
- Rene King: 1993–2004
- Michelle Greene: 2004–2017
- Paula Anderson: 2017–2021
- Toshawnka Mahone 2021–2026
- Kevin Branhaw 2026–Present
