= Hemingway, South Carolina =

- Town
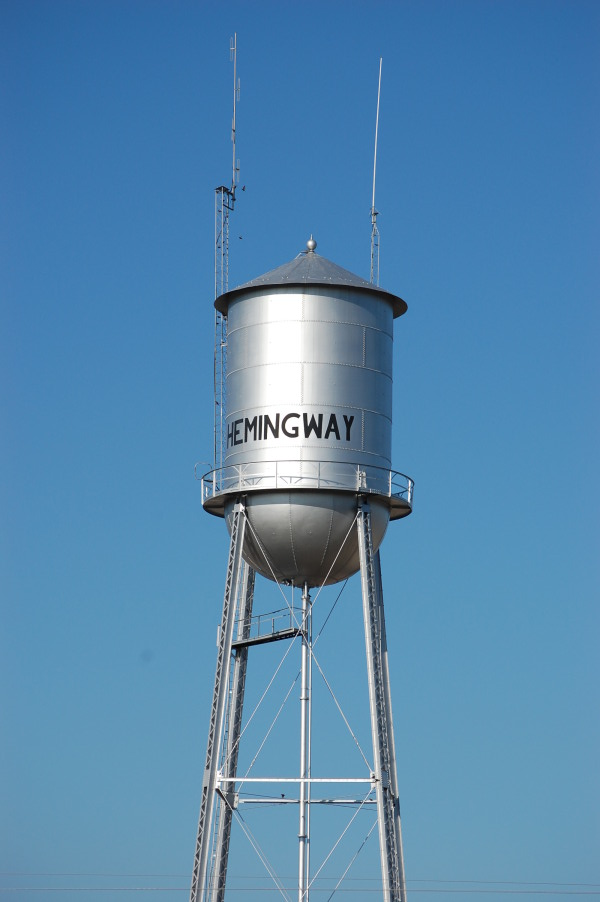
- Water tower in downtown Hemingway

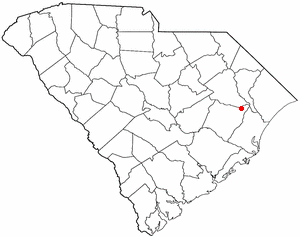
- Location of Hemingway, South Carolina
- Coordinates: 33°45′06″N 79°26′47″W
- Country: United States
- State: South Carolina
- County: Williamsburg

Area
  - Total: 0.86 sq mi (2.24 km^{2})
  - Land: 0.86 sq mi (2.24 km^{2})
  - Water: 0 sq mi (0.00 km^{2})
- Elevation: 56 ft (17 m)

Population (2020)
  - Total: 504
  - Density: 583.5/sq mi (225.28/km^{2})
- Time zone: UTC-5 (Eastern (EST))
  - Summer (DST): UTC-4 (EDT)
- ZIP code: 29554
- Area codes: 843, 854
- FIPS code: 45-33145
- GNIS feature ID: 2405816
- Website: www.townofhemingway.org

Hemingway is a town in Williamsburg County, South Carolina, United States. The population was 504 as of the 2020 Census.

== History ==
Hemingway was created from a crossroads community named Lamberts in 1911 by Dr. W. C. Hemingway, in an effort to secure a depot for the proposed Seaboard Coast Line Railroad, which was to run from Mullins to Andrews. Land owned by Dr. Hemingway was surveyed and the lots auctioned off. Subsequently, the railroad established a Hemingway depot, and the post office name was changed to Hemingway.

With rail access, Hemingway grew into a market town for local agricultural products. Cotton declined after 1921, when the boll weevil arrived, but was already being replaced by flue-cured tobacco as the primary money crop for farmers. Other local products were naval stores from the pine forests (later replaced by timbering), corn, soybeans, wheat, and vegetables.

Hemingway is near the Pee Dee River, which was the main commercial route for the area until the coming of the railroad. Snows Lake is near Hemingway. This is also a site in the Revolutionary War camp of US war hero General Francis Marion. The river was named by early explorers after the Pee Dee tribe. A major tributary is the Waccamaw River, likewise named.

Pleasant Hill Consolidated School was listed on the National Register of Historic Places in 1998.

== Geography ==
According to the United States Census Bureau, the town has a total area of 0.9 square miles (2.3 km^{2}), all of it land.

== Demographics ==
Historical population
Census	Pop.	Note	%±
1920	371		—
1930	351		−5.4%
1940	536		52.7%
1950	821		53.2%
1960	951		15.8%
1970	1,026		7.9%
1980	853		−16.9%
1990	829		−2.8%
2000	573		−30.9%
2010	459		−19.9%
2020	504		9.8%
U.S. Decennial Census

As of the census of 2000, 573 people, 259 households, and 182 families resided in the town. The population density was 653.2 inhabitants per square mile (252.2/km^{2}). The 278 housing units averaged 316.9 per square mile (122.0/km^{2}). The racial makeup of the town was 80.80% White, 18.50% African American, 0.35% Native American, 0.17% from other races, and 0.17% from two or more races. Hispanics or Latinos of any race were 0.17% of the population. Of the 259 households, 26.3% had children under the age of 18 living with them, 49.4% were married couples living together, 15.8% had a female householder with no husband present, and 29.7% were not families. About 29.3% of all households were made up of individuals, and 15.4% had someone living alone who was 65 years of age or older. The average household size was 2.21 and the average family size was 2.71.

In the town, the population was distributed as 22.3% under the age of 18, 5.9% from 18 to 24, 21.3% from 25 to 44, 26.7% from 45 to 64, and 23.7% who were 65 years of age or older. The median age was 45 years. For every 100 females, there were 82.5 males. For every 100 females age 18 and over, there were 75.2 males.

The median income for a household in the town was $28,250, and for a family was $50,179. Males had a median income of $28,125 versus $20,987 for females. The per capita income for the town was $17,888. About 9.9% of families and 13.1% of the population were below the poverty line, including 18.2% of those under age 18 and 15.6% of those age 65 or over.

== Economy ==
Besides agriculture, the manufacture of textiles has been important in the past, with numerous sewing factories, but most of these have since closed. Talous, where insect-resistant suits for sportsmen are sewed, and Hemingway Apparel, are exceptions. Important industries today are Tupperware (plastic kitchenware), House of Raeford (meat products), C-V Unlimited (remanufactured auto parts), Don's Scrap Iron and Metal Co., Southeastern Wire Fabricators, Inc. (manufactured wire products), and Palmetto Paper Tube. Some people commute to Wellman Industries in Johnsonville, South Carolina or to International Paper Company or Georgetown Steel in Georgetown. Williamsburg County runs a bus service for workers who commute to nearby Myrtle Beach, which offers jobs in the hospitality industry and construction.

In June 2024, Tupperware announced the closure of its factory in Hemingway and the layoff of almost 150 people. The factory had opened in April 1976, but layoffs previously occurred of 300 people in 1996 and 250 in 2005. Tupperware itself was in bankruptcy by September 2024.

Hemingway has always been associated with Johnsonville, which, though divided by a county line, is only 4 miles (6.4 km) north, and they are sometimes referred to locally as the twin cities. Hemingway recently completed a new industrial park midway between the two cities, with a deep well and sewer service.

== Arts and culture ==
Hemingway hosts the annual Bar-B-Q Shag Festival held in the spring. This features a cookoff of low country-style pork barbecue, and dancing of the official state dance of South Carolina - the Carolina shag.

Hemingway has a public library, a branch of the Williamsburg County Library.

== Notable people ==
- Rodney Scott, pitmaster and James Beard award winner.
- Sylvia Woods, American restaurateur, co-founded Sylvia's Restaurant of Harlem.
