= Myrtle Beach, South Carolina =

City in South Carolina, United States

Myrtle Beach
- City
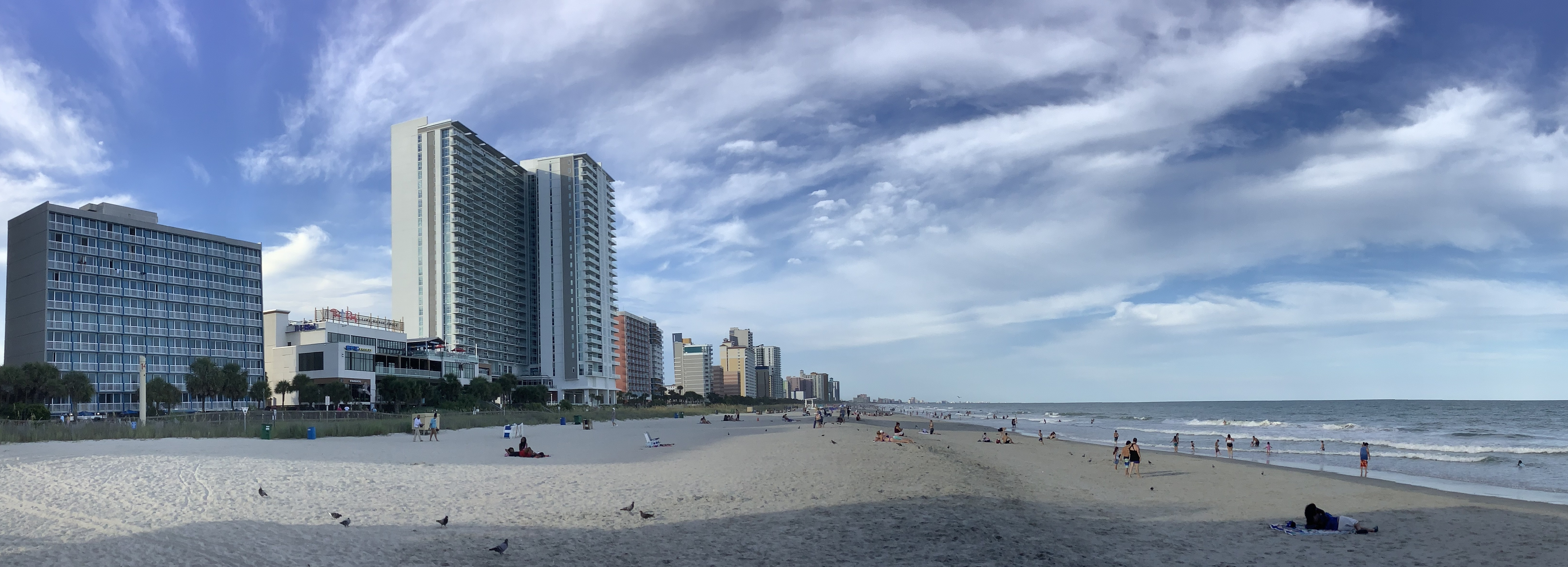
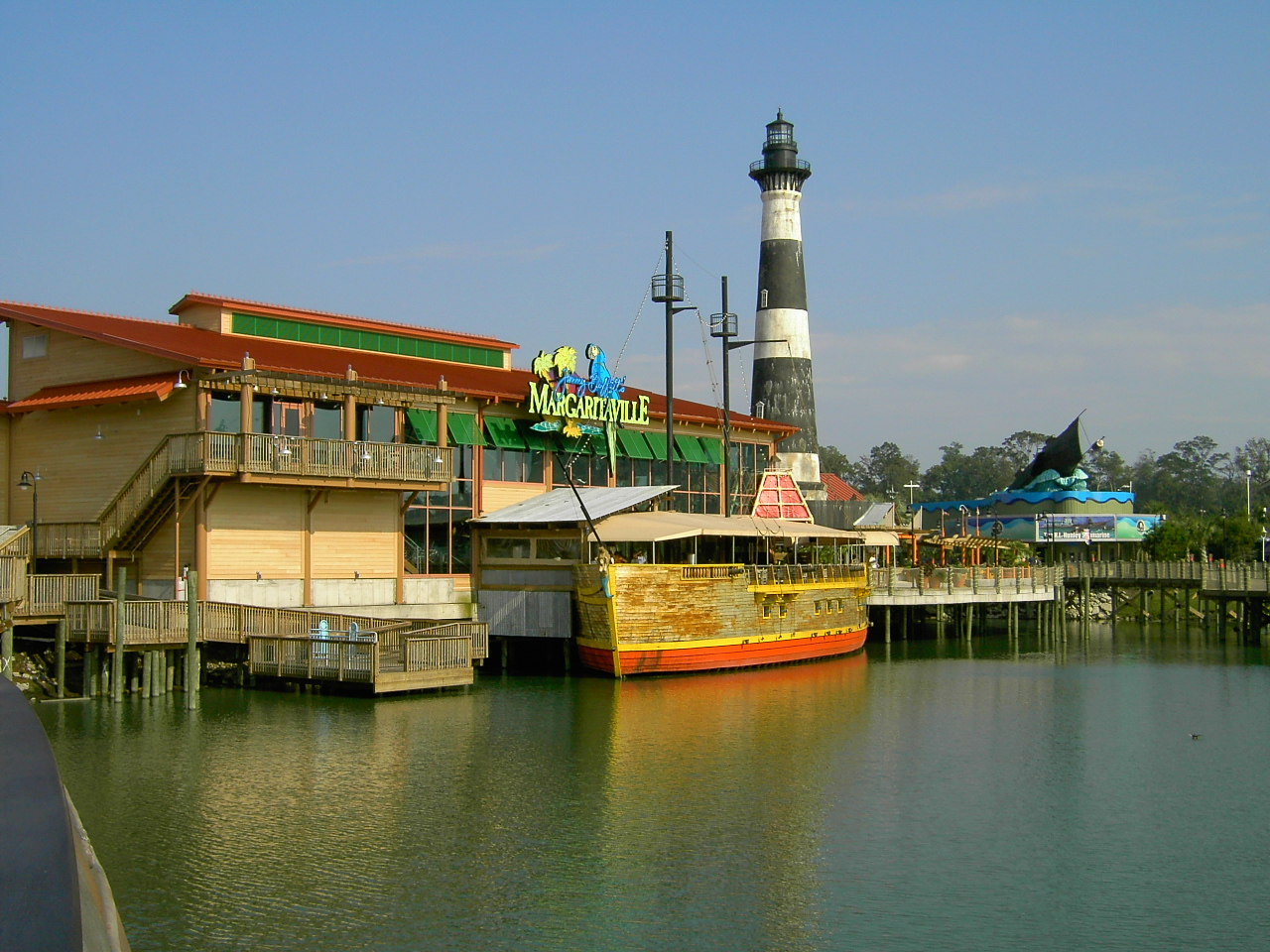
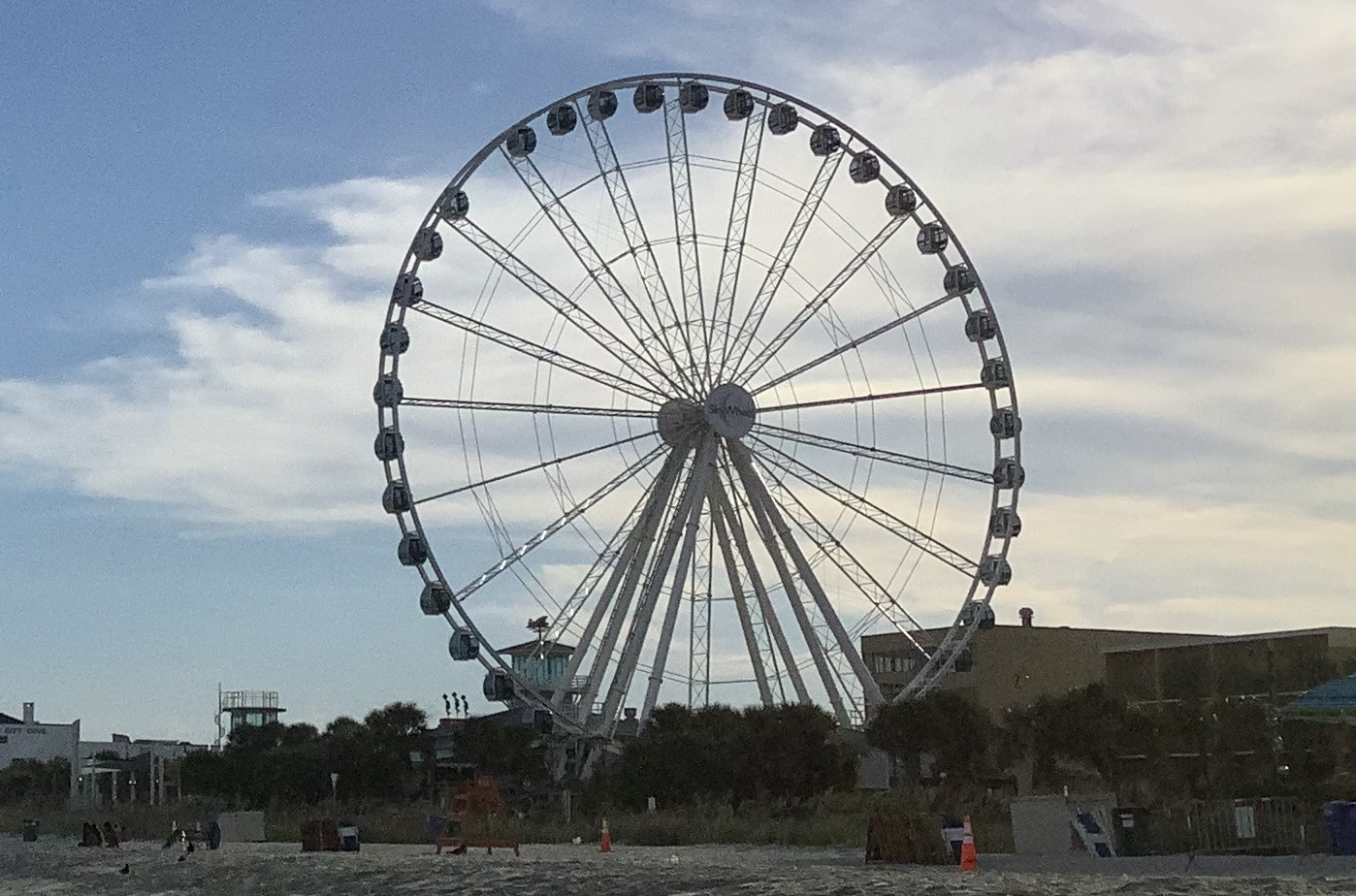
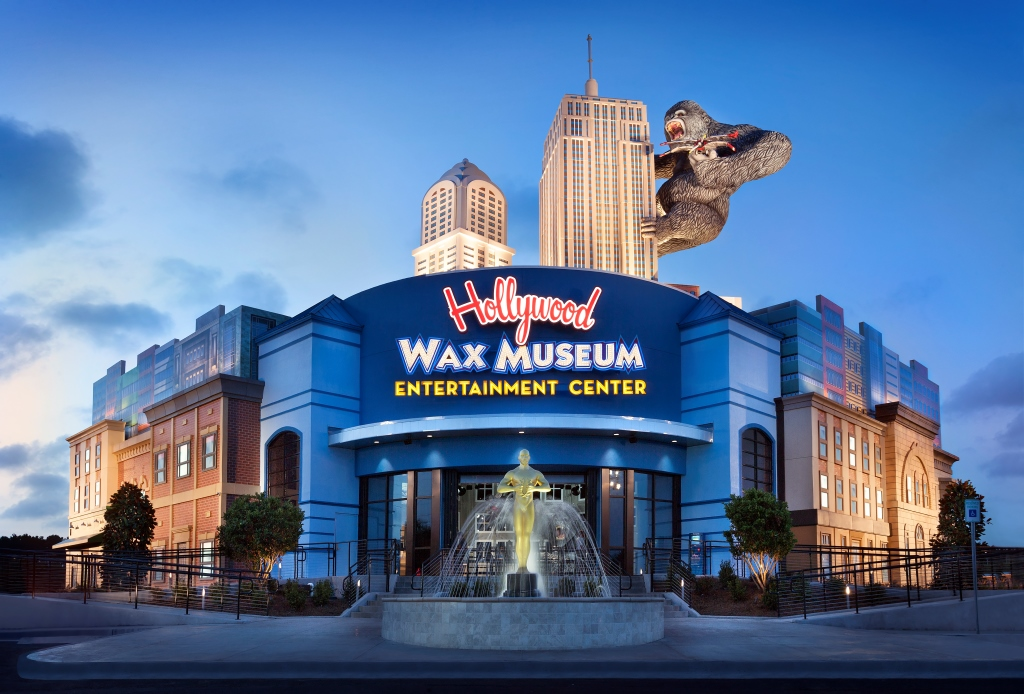
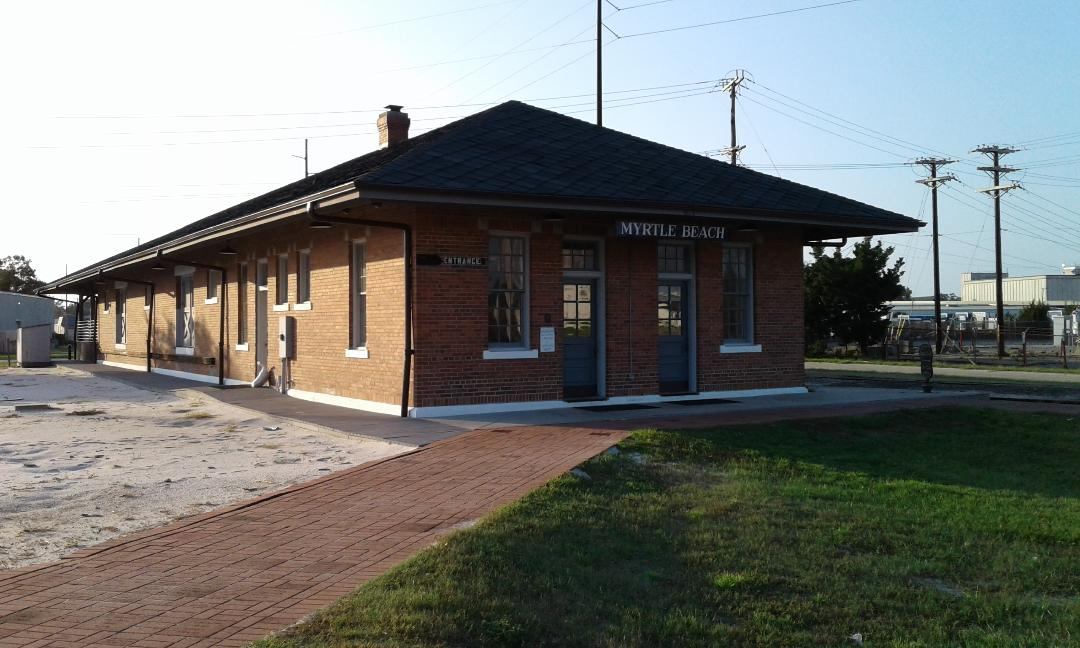
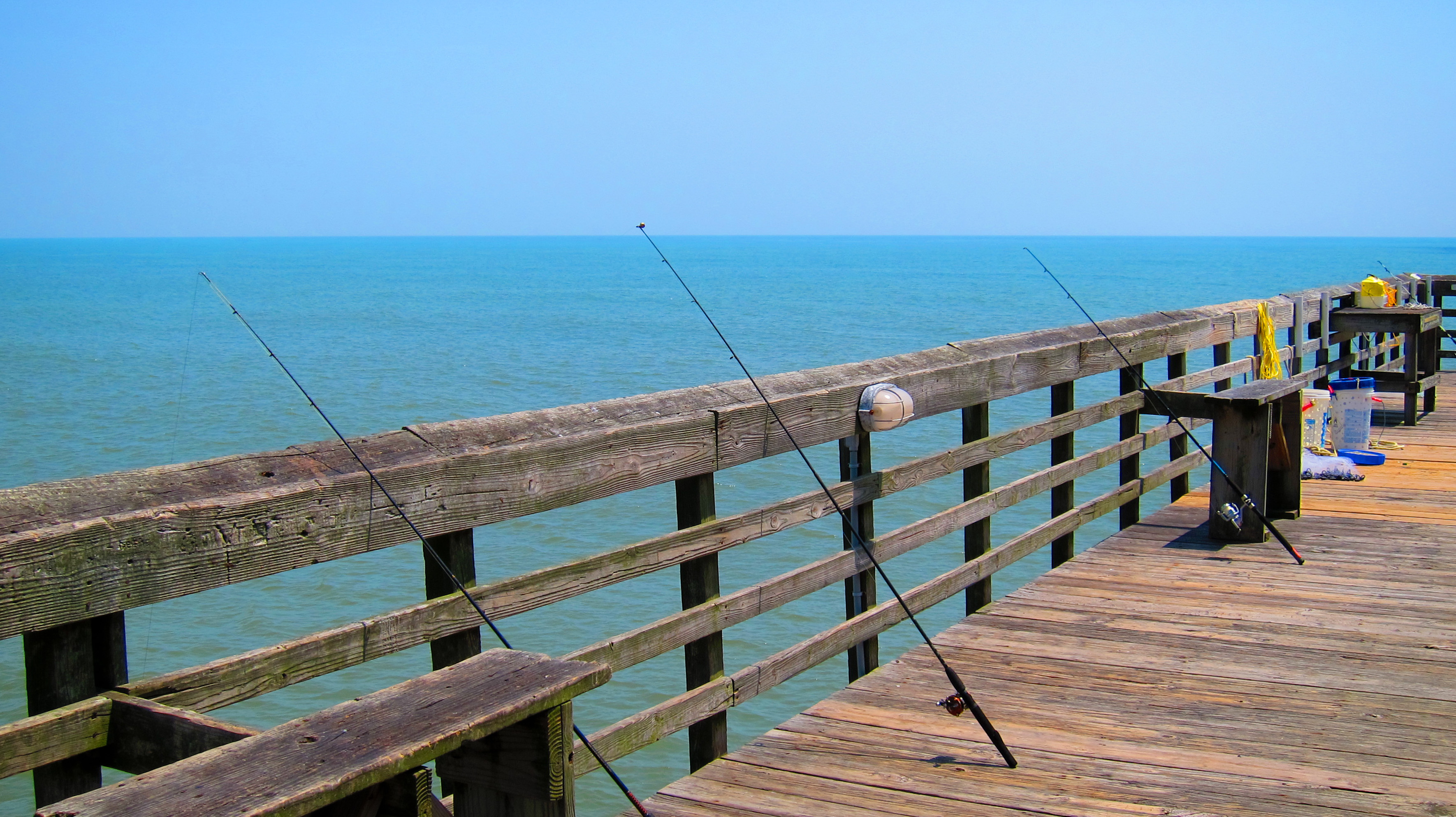
- Myrtle Beach shoreline Broadway at the Beach Myrtle Beach SkyWheel Hollywood Wax Museum Atlantic Coast Line Depot Myrtle Beach State Park

- Flag Seal
- Motto: "First in Service"
- Interactive map of Myrtle Beach
- Location within South Carolina Location within the United States
- Coordinates: 33°43′49″N 78°52′11″W
- Country: United States
- State: South Carolina
- County: Horry
- Incorporated (town): March 12, 1938
- Incorporated (city): 1957
- Named for: The wax myrtle, an abundant local shrub

Government
  - Type: Mayor–Council
  - Mayor: Mark Kruea
  - City Council: Members: Mark Kruea – Mayor; Jackie Vereen Hatley – Mayor Pro Tempore; Michael Chestnut; John Krajc; Clyde H. "Mike" Lowder; Philip N. Render, DMD; Gregg Smith

Area
  - City: 23.69 sq mi (61.36 km^{2})
  - Land: 23.42 sq mi (60.65 km^{2})
  - Water: 0.27 sq mi (0.71 km^{2}) 1.14%
- Elevation: 26 ft (7.9 m)

Population (2020)
  - City: 35,682
  - Rank: 13th in South Carolina
  - Density: 1,523.7/sq mi (588.32/km^{2})
  - Urban: 298,954 (US: 135th)
  - Urban density: 1,365/sq mi (527.2/km^{2})
  - Metro: 397,478 (US: 139th)
- Time zone: UTC−05:00 (EST)
  - Summer (DST): UTC−04:00 (EDT)
- ZIP Codes: 29572, 29575, 29577, 29578, 29579, 29587, 29588
- Area codes: 843, 854
- FIPS code: 45-49075
- GNIS feature ID: 2404346
- Website: cityofmyrtlebeach.com

Myrtle Beach is a resort city in Horry County, South Carolina, United States. It is located in the center of a long and continuous 60-mile (97 km) stretch of beach known as the "Grand Strand” in the northeastern part of the state, on the East Coast of the United States. Its year-round population was 35,682 as of the 2020 census, making it the 13th-most populous city in South Carolina.

Myrtle Beach is one of the major centers of tourism in South Carolina and the United States. The city's warm subtropical climate, miles of beaches, 86 golf courses, and 1,800 restaurants attract over 20 million visitors each year, making Myrtle Beach one of the most visited destinations in the country.

Located along the historic King's Highway (modern day US 17), the region was once home to the Waccamaw people. During the colonial period, the Whither family settled in the area, and a prominent local waterway, Wither's Swash, is named in their honor. Originally called alternately "New Town" or "Withers", the area was targeted for development as a resort community by Franklin Burroughs, whose sons completed a railroad to the beach and the first inn, Seaside Inn. His widow named the new community Myrtle Beach after the local wax-myrtle shrubs.

The Myrtle Beach area is one of the fastest growing metropolitan areas in the country, with an estimated population of 479,426 in 2024. More than 104,000 people moved to the area over eight years, representing a nearly 28% growth in population.

== History ==
The F.G. Burroughs steamship

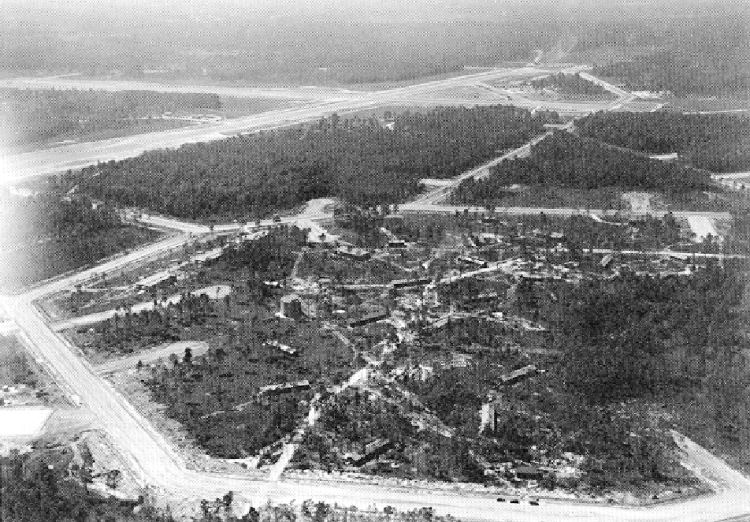
Original Myrtle Beach Air Force Base during World War II

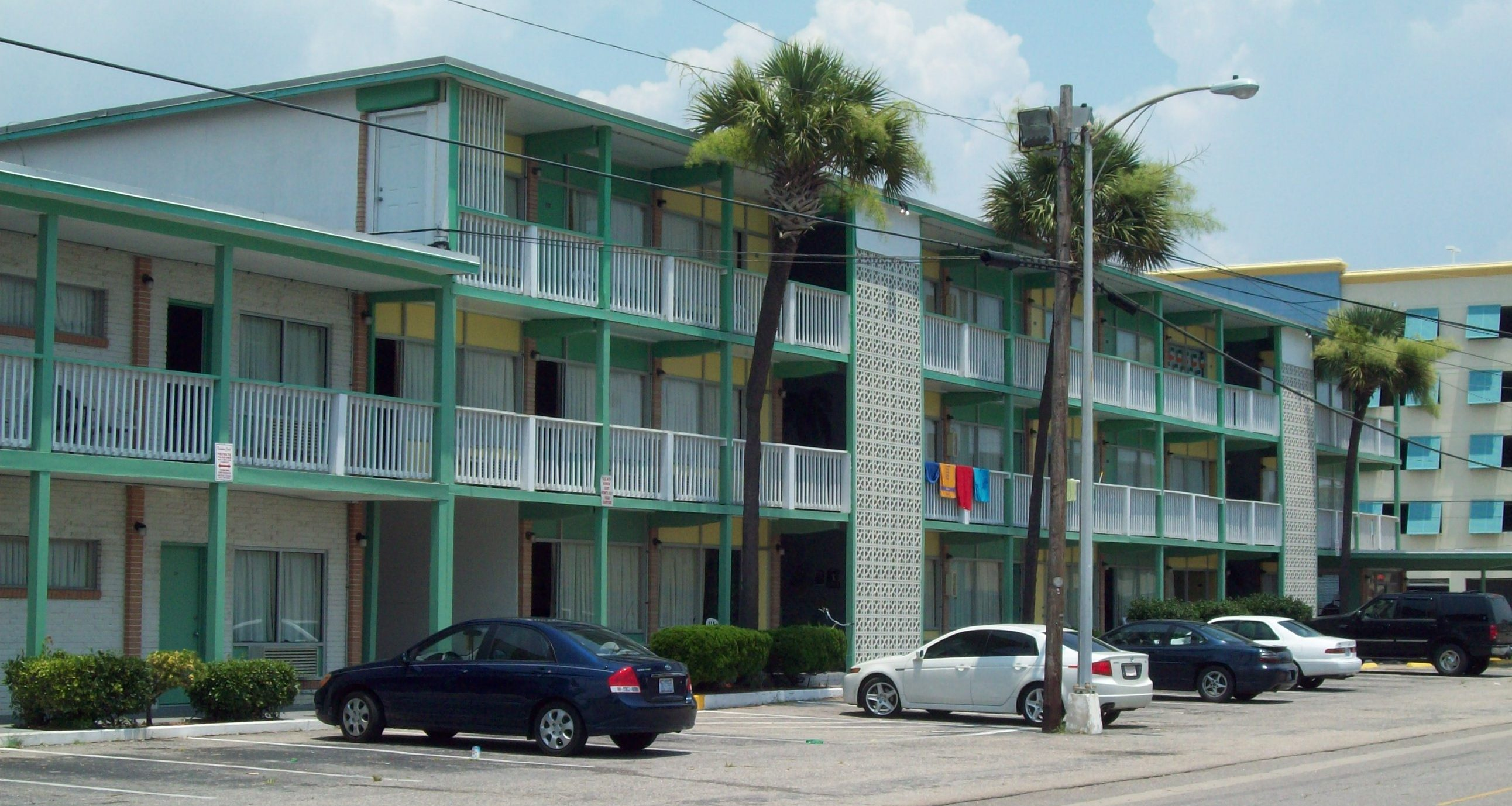
Rainbow Court (built 1935 to 1959), now demolished, was listed on the National Register of Historic Places.

Prior to the arrival of Europeans, the Long Bay area was inhabited by the historic Waccamaw tribe. The Waccamaw used the river for travel and fished along the shore around Little River. Waties Island, the primary barrier island along Long Bay, has evidence of burial and shell mounds, remains of the visiting Waccamaw.

The first European settlers along Long Bay arrived in the late 18th century, attempting to extend the plantation system outward toward the ocean. Records are sparse from this period, with most of the recorded history pieced together from English colonial land grant documents. These settlers gained mixed results, producing unremarkable quantities of indigo and tobacco, the two major commodity crops. The coast's soil was sandy and most of the crop yields were of inferior quality.

Prior to the American Revolution, the area along the future Grand Strand was essentially uninhabited. Several families received land grants along the coast, including the Witherses: John, Richard, William, and Mary. This family received an area around present-day Wither's Swash, also known as Myrtle Swash or the Eight-Mile Swash. A separate grant was granted to James Minor, including a barrier island named Minor Island, now Waties Island, off the coast near Little River.

Mary Withers's gravestone at Prince George Winyah Parish Church speaks to the remoteness of the former Strand: "She gave up the pleasures of Society and retired to Long Bay, where she resided a great part of her life devoted to the welfare of her children."

As the American colonies gained independence, the area remained essentially unchanged, and the coast remained barren. George Washington scouted out the Southern states during his term, traveling down the King's Highway. He stayed a night at Windy Hill (part of present-day North Myrtle Beach) and was led across Wither's Swash to Georgetown by Jeremiah Vereen.

The Withers family remained one of the few settlers around Myrtle Beach for the next half-century. In 1822, a strong hurricane swept the house of R. F. Withers into the ocean, drowning 18 people inside. The tragedy made the Withers family decide to abandon their plots along the coast. Left unattended, the area began to return to forest.

The Burroughs and Collins Company of Conway, predecessor of modern-day Burroughs & Chapin, purchased much of the Withers family's land in 1881. The growing community was called "New Town" around the start of the 20th century. A post office named "Withers" was established to serve the site of the old Swash in 1888. On 28 February 1899, Burroughs and Collins received a charter to build the Conway & Seashore Railroad to transport timber from the coast to inland customers. The railroad began daily service on 1 May 1900, with two wood-burning locomotives. One of the engines was dubbed The Black Maria and came second-hand from a North Carolina logging operation.

After the railroad was finished, employees of the lumber and railroad company would take train flatcars down to the beach area on their free weekends, becoming the first Grand Strand tourists. The railroad terminus was nicknamed "New Town", contrasting it with the "Old Town", or Conway.

Around the start of the 20th century, Franklin Burroughs envisioned turning New Town into a tourist destination rivaling the Florida and northeastern beaches. Burroughs died in 1897, but his sons completed the railroad's expansion to the beach and opened the Seaside Inn in 1901.

Around 1900, a contest was held to name the area, and Burroughs's wife suggested honoring the locally abundant shrub, the southern wax myrtle (Myrica cerifera). The Withers post office changed its name to "Myrtle Beach" soon afterward. It incorporated as a town in 1938 and as a city in 1957.

In 1937, Myrtle Beach Municipal Airport was built. It was taken over by the U.S. Army Air Corps in 1940 and converted into a military base. Commercial flights began in 1976 and shared the runway for over 15 years until the air base closed in 1993. Since then the airport has been named Myrtle Beach International Airport. In 2010 plans to build a new terminal were approved. In 1940, Kings Highway was finally paved, giving Myrtle Beach its first primary highway.

The Myrtle Heights-Oak Park Historic District, Myrtle Beach Atlantic Coast Line Railroad Station, Ocean Forest Country Club and Pleasant Inn are listed on the National Register of Historic Places. Also listed were the Chesterfield Inn, Rainbow Court and the Myrtle Beach Pavilion, all now demolished. The Gay Dolphin Gift Cove on the Boardwalk was built in 1946 and sells seashells and Myrtle Beach souvenirs. It claims to be the "nation's largest gift shop".

== Geography ==
Myrtle Beach has been separated from the continental United States since 1936 by the Intracoastal Waterway, forcing the city and area in general to develop within a small distance from the coast. In part due to this separation, the area directly northwest of Myrtle Beach, across the waterway, remained primarily rural for a while, whereas its northeastern and southwestern ends were bordered by other developed tourist towns, North Myrtle Beach and Surfside Beach. Since then, the inland portion of the Myrtle Beach area has developed dramatically.

Myrtle Beach is 67 miles (108 km) by highway southeast of Florence, 94 miles (151 km) northeast of Charleston, and 74 miles (119 km) southwest of Wilmington.

According to the United States Census Bureau, the city has a total area of 23.69 square miles (61.4 km^{2}), of which 23.42 square miles (60.7 km^{2}) is land and 0.27 square miles (0.70 km^{2}) (1.14%) is water.

=== Neighborhoods ===
- Arcadian Shores
- Benton Park
- Booker T. Washington
- Carrie May Johnson
- Carver
- Chestnut Hill
- Dogwood
- The Dunes
- Dunes Cove
- East Chester
- Fantasy Harbour
- Forest Acres
- Forest Dunes
- Futrell Park
- Grande Dunes
- Green Bay Park
- Harlem
- Highlands
- Hurl Rocks
- Konig
- Market Common
- Myrtle Heights
- Myrtlewood
- Northwood
- Ocean Forest
- Ocean View
- Old Pine Lakes
- Owens
- Pebble Beach
- Pine Lake Estates
- Pine Lakes
- Plantation Point
- Racepath
- Ramsey Acres
- Seagate Village
- Springmaid Beach
- Washington Park
- Withers Preserve
- Withers Swash
- Yaupon Circle

=== Climate ===
According to the Köppen climate classification, Myrtle Beach has a humid subtropical climate or Cfa – typical of the Gulf and South Atlantic states. The city enjoys abundant sunshine year-round with more than 2800 hours annually.

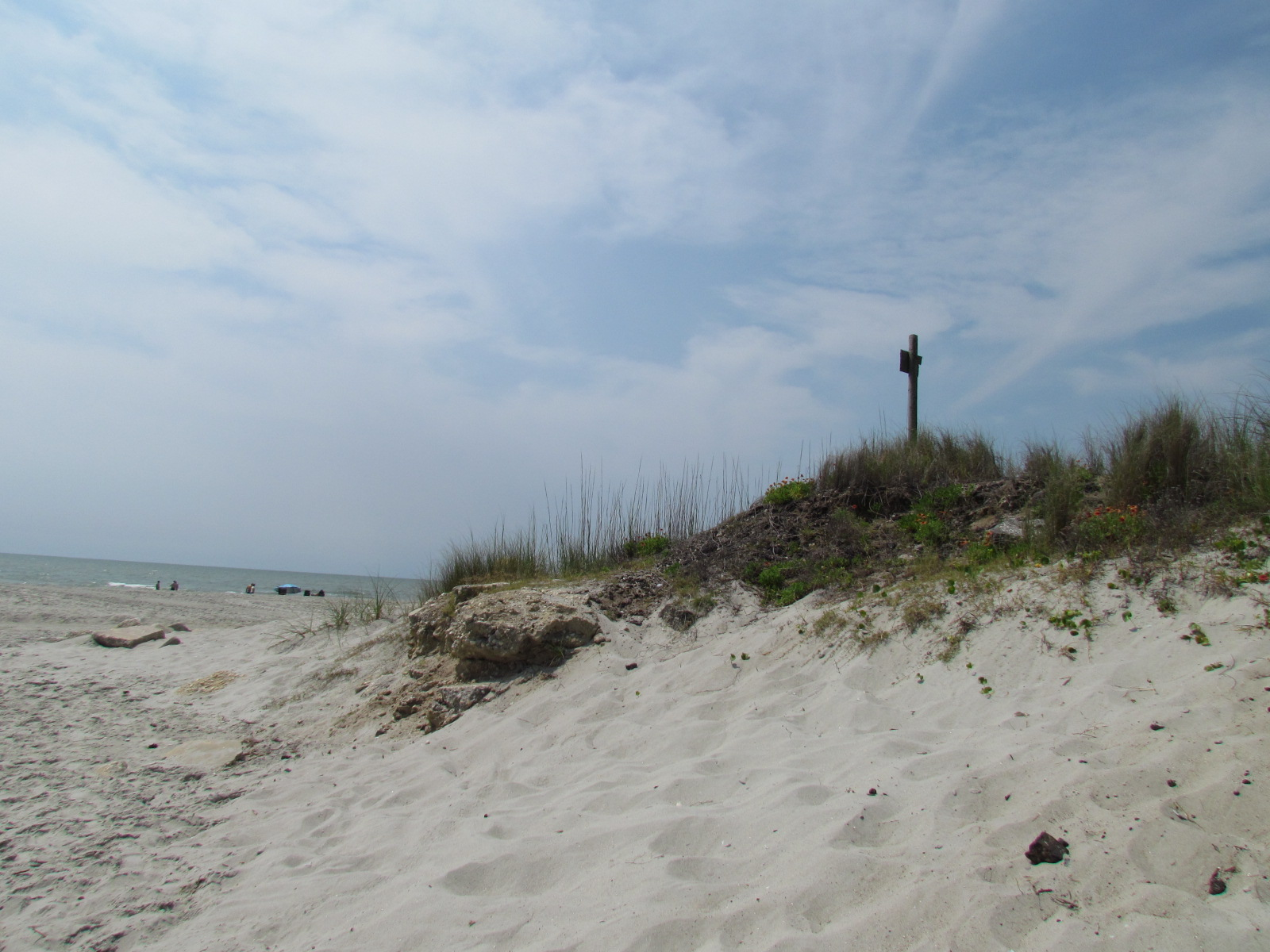
Myrtle Beach is protected from erosion by vegetation-filled sand dunes.

The summer season is long, hot, and humid in Myrtle Beach. Average daytime highs are from 83 to 91 °F (28 to 33 °C) and average night-time lows are near 70 °F (21 °C). The coastal location of Myrtle Beach mitigates daytime summer heat somewhat compared to inland areas of South Carolina: Thus, while nearby Florence averages 65 days annually with high temperatures of 90 °F (32 °C) or higher – Myrtle Beach averages only 21. The Bermuda High pumps in humidity from the tropical Atlantic toward Myrtle Beach, giving summers a near-tropical feel in the city. The warm Atlantic Ocean reaches 80 °F (27 °C) or higher in the summer months off Myrtle Beach, making for warm and sultry summer nights. Summer thunderstorms are common in the hot season in Myrtle Beach, and the summer months from June through September have the most precipitation. In summer, thunderstorms normally build during the heat of the day – followed by brief and intense downpours. On average, September is the wettest month, with August close behind, due to the combination of thunderstorms and tropical weather systems that peaks these months.

Myrtle Beach has mostly mild winters of short duration: Average daytime highs range from 57 to 61 °F (14 to 16 °C) and nighttime lows are in the 36 to 38 °F (2 to 3 °C) from December through February. Winter temperatures vary more than summer temperatures in Myrtle Beach: Some winters can see several cold days with highs only in the upper 40s °F (7–9 °C), while other winter days can see highs in the upper 60s and low 70s °F (19–23 °C). Myrtle Beach averages 33 days annually with frost, though in some years less than 15 days will see frost. Snowfall is very rare in Myrtle Beach; however, at least a trace of snow falls a few times each decade. In February 2010, a rare 2.8 inches (71 mm) of snow fell in Myrtle Beach. The spring (March, April and May) and fall (September, October and November) months are normally mild and sunny in Myrtle Beach, with high temperatures in the 60s and 70s Fahrenheit (16 to 25 C). The beach season in Myrtle Beach normally runs from late April through late October. Sea surface temperatures are often in the lower 80's °F (26–28 °C) off South Carolina in summer and early fall.

The temperature range measured in Myrtle Beach has historically ranged from a record high of 104 °F (40 °C) on June 26, 1952, and August 5, 1954, to the record winter cold of 9 °F (−13 °C) on February 18, 1958. In spite of the mild winter averages, ice days have been recorded, albeit rarely. The coldest daily maximum was 25 °F (−4 °C) on January 11, 1962, whereas the normal year between 1991 and 2020 had the coldest maximum average of 37 °F (3 °C). Overnight lows can be extremely hot and muggy, although the record warm low of 88 °F (31 °C) on July 12, 1942, is some way above the means of 81 °F (27 °C) for the warmest annual minimum.

Summer thunderstorms are typically brief, but severe thunderstorms do occur on occasion. Tornadoes are rare, with the most significant event occurring in 2001 when multiple tornadoes touched down in the area. Tropical cyclones occasionally impact Myrtle Beach, though weaker tropical storms and weak tropical lows are more common. Like most areas prone to tropical cyclones, a direct hit by a major hurricane is infrequent in Myrtle Beach. The last hurricane to cause significant damage in Myrtle Beach was Hurricane Hugo in 1989. The worst hurricane in Myrtle Beach's history was Hurricane Hazel in 1954.

Climate data for Myrtle Beach, South Carolina (1991−2020 normals, extremes 1931–present)
Month	Jan	Feb	Mar	Apr	May	Jun	Jul	Aug	Sep	Oct	Nov	Dec	Year
Record high °F (°C)	81 (27)	86 (30)	88 (31)	92 (33)	99 (37)	104 (40)	101 (38)	104 (40)	99 (37)	93 (34)	86 (30)	84 (29)	104 (40)
Mean maximum °F (°C)	70.9 (21.6)	72.2 (22.3)	79.1 (26.2)	83.0 (28.3)	90.0 (32.2)	92.9 (33.8)	95.1 (35.1)	93.2 (34.0)	90.3 (32.4)	84.9 (29.4)	78.8 (26.0)	73.3 (22.9)	96.4 (35.8)
Mean daily maximum °F (°C)	55.5 (13.1)	57.8 (14.3)	63.7 (17.6)	71.5 (21.9)	78.8 (26.0)	84.5 (29.2)	87.4 (30.8)	86.5 (30.3)	83.0 (28.3)	75.6 (24.2)	66.4 (19.1)	58.6 (14.8)	72.4 (22.5)
Daily mean °F (°C)	44.5 (6.9)	46.6 (8.1)	52.7 (11.5)	61.1 (16.2)	69.3 (20.7)	76.2 (24.6)	79.5 (26.4)	78.3 (25.7)	74.0 (23.3)	64.7 (18.2)	54.3 (12.4)	47.4 (8.6)	62.4 (16.9)
Mean daily minimum °F (°C)	33.6 (0.9)	35.5 (1.9)	41.8 (5.4)	50.6 (10.3)	59.7 (15.4)	67.9 (19.9)	71.6 (22.0)	70.0 (21.1)	65.0 (18.3)	53.8 (12.1)	42.2 (5.7)	36.3 (2.4)	52.3 (11.3)
Mean minimum °F (°C)	20.9 (−6.2)	24.8 (−4.0)	28.6 (−1.9)	37.5 (3.1)	47.8 (8.8)	59.2 (15.1)	66.7 (19.3)	64.9 (18.3)	55.5 (13.1)	40.3 (4.6)	29.5 (−1.4)	25.0 (−3.9)	19.2 (−7.1)
Record low °F (°C)	10 (−12)	9 (−13)	18 (−8)	25 (−4)	36 (2)	48 (9)	54 (12)	54 (12)	43 (6)	25 (−4)	16 (−9)	10 (−12)	9 (−13)
Average precipitation inches (mm)	3.43 (87)	3.76 (96)	3.71 (94)	3.38 (86)	3.80 (97)	4.85 (123)	6.61 (168)	6.27 (159)	6.77 (172)	4.11 (104)	3.06 (78)	3.81 (97)	53.56 (1,361)
Average precipitation days (≥ 0.01 inch)	9.9	9.2	9.5	7.9	9.5	10.6	12.1	11.8	10.7	8.0	8.3	10.3	117.8
Source 1: NOAA
Source 2: National Weather Service

Climate data for Myrtle Beach (North Myrtle Beach Airport) 1991−2020 normals, extremes 1999–present
Month	Jan	Feb	Mar	Apr	May	Jun	Jul	Aug	Sep	Oct	Nov	Dec	Year
Record high °F (°C)	78 (26)	81 (27)	88 (31)	92 (33)	99 (37)	98 (37)	101 (38)	98 (37)	95 (35)	91 (33)	82 (28)	79 (26)	101 (38)
Mean maximum °F (°C)	71.3 (21.8)	71.8 (22.1)	79.9 (26.6)	82.7 (28.2)	90.2 (32.3)	93.7 (34.3)	94.6 (34.8)	92.9 (33.8)	90.6 (32.6)	86.1 (30.1)	78.9 (26.1)	74.0 (23.3)	95.7 (35.4)
Mean daily maximum °F (°C)	55.7 (13.2)	58.2 (14.6)	64.7 (18.2)	71.8 (22.1)	78.7 (25.9)	84.8 (29.3)	87.6 (30.9)	86.5 (30.3)	83.2 (28.4)	75.6 (24.2)	66.4 (19.1)	59.3 (15.2)	72.7 (22.6)
Daily mean °F (°C)	46.2 (7.9)	48.9 (9.4)	55.0 (12.8)	62.5 (16.9)	70.4 (21.3)	77.5 (25.3)	80.6 (27.0)	79.5 (26.4)	75.5 (24.2)	66.0 (18.9)	56.0 (13.3)	49.6 (9.8)	64.0 (17.8)
Mean daily minimum °F (°C)	36.7 (2.6)	39.6 (4.2)	45.4 (7.4)	53.3 (11.8)	62.1 (16.7)	70.3 (21.3)	73.7 (23.2)	72.5 (22.5)	67.7 (19.8)	56.3 (13.5)	45.6 (7.6)	40.0 (4.4)	55.3 (12.9)
Mean minimum °F (°C)	20.5 (−6.4)	24.8 (−4.0)	28.7 (−1.8)	37.7 (3.2)	48.1 (8.9)	60.5 (15.8)	65.5 (18.6)	66.5 (19.2)	57.7 (14.3)	40.9 (4.9)	29.2 (−1.6)	25.7 (−3.5)	19.1 (−7.2)
Record low °F (°C)	13 (−11)	15 (−9)	21 (−6)	29 (−2)	43 (6)	53 (12)	59 (15)	56 (13)	47 (8)	30 (−1)	22 (−6)	17 (−8)	13 (−11)
Average precipitation inches (mm)	3.01 (76)	3.18 (81)	3.59 (91)	2.77 (70)	2.96 (75)	4.07 (103)	5.40 (137)	6.25 (159)	6.25 (159)	4.20 (107)	3.29 (84)	3.10 (79)	48.47 (1,231)
Average precipitation days (≥ 0.01 in)	9.8	9.3	9.8	8.4	9.6	11.3	12.6	12.3	10.9	8.7	8.9	10.4	122.0
Source: NOAA (mean maxima/minima 2006–2020)

== Demographics ==
Historical population
Census	Pop.	Note	%±
1940	1,597		—
1950	3,345		109.5%
1960	7,834		134.2%
1970	8,536		9.0%
1980	18,446		116.1%
1990	24,848		34.7%
2000	25,759		3.7%
2010	27,109		5.2%
2020	35,682		31.6%
2025 (est.)	40,937		14.7%
U.S. Decennial Census

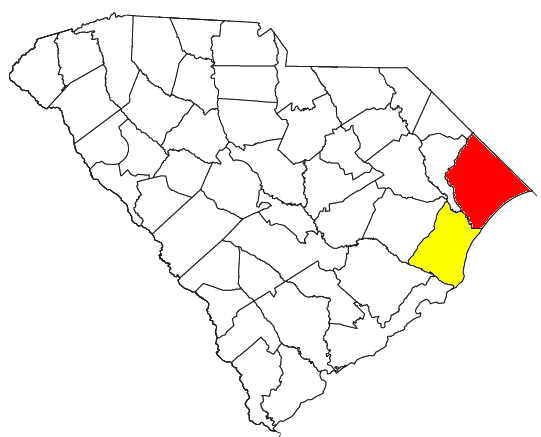
Location of the Myrtle Beach-Conway-Georgetown CSA and its components: Myrtle Beach-Conway-North Myrtle Beach, SC Metropolitan Statistical Area Murrells Inlet, SC Micropolitan Statistical Area

Myrtle Beach is the largest principal city of the Myrtle Beach-Conway, SC Combined Statistical Area, which had an estimated population of 479,426 in 2024, and includes the Myrtle Beach-Conway-North Myrtle Beach, SC Metropolitan Statistical Area (Horry County) and the Murrells Inlet, SC Micropolitan Statistical Area (Georgetown County).

=== 2020 census ===
As of the 2020 census, there were 35,682 people, 16,759 households, and 7,678 families residing in the city.

The median age was 49.4 years, with 15.8% of residents under the age of 18 and 25.4% aged 65 years or older, and there were 97.5 males for every 100 females, dropping to 95.5 males for every 100 females age 18 and over.

Of those households, 18.4% had children under the age of 18 living in them, 40.2% were married-couple households, 22.4% were households with a male householder and no spouse or partner present, and 30.3% were households with a female householder and no spouse or partner present; about 35.3% were made up of individuals and 15.0% had someone living alone who was 65 years of age or older.

There were 22,456 housing units, of which 25.4% were vacant, with a homeowner vacancy rate of 2.9% and a rental vacancy rate of 10.9%.

100.0% of residents lived in urban areas, while 0.0% lived in rural areas.

Racial composition as of the 2020 census
Race	Number	Percent
White	24,530	68.7%
Black or African American	4,712	13.2%
American Indian and Alaska Native	187	0.5%
Asian	832	2.3%
Native Hawaiian and Other Pacific Islander	38	0.1%
Some other race	2,512	7.0%
Two or more races	2,871	8.0%
Hispanic or Latino (of any race)	4,259	11.9%

=== 2010 census ===
At the 2010 census, the population of Myrtle Beach was 27,109.

=== 2000 census ===
At the 2000 census, there were 22,759 permanent residents in Myrtle Beach, 10,413 households, 5,414 families, 1,356.5 per square mile (523.7/km^{2}), with 14,658 housing units at an average density of 873.5 per square mile (337.3/km^{2}).

==== Ethnicities ====
The city's racial makeup was:

- 72.3% White
- 13.9% Black
- 0.7% Native American
- 1.5% Asian
- 0.3% Pacific Islander
- 8.7% from other races
- 2.7% from two or more races.

Hispanic or Latino residents, of any race, were 13.7% of the population.

==== Age ====
Of the total Myrtle Beach population:

- 18.0% were 1–17
- 11.0% were between 18 and 24
- 33.6% were between 25 and 44
- 22.5% were between 45 and 64
- 15.0% were 65 or older
- Median age was 37 years
- 103 males per 100 females overall
- 101 males per 100 females age 18 and over

==== Income ====
- Overall median income for a household in the city was $50,173
- Median income for a family was $43,900
- Males had a median income of $26,039
- Females had a median income of $22,473
- The per capita income for the city was $23,214.
- About 7.6% of families and 12.0% of the population were below the poverty line, including 17.1% of those under age 18 and 6.6% of those age 65 or over.

== Economy ==
Myrtle Beach's economy is dominated by the tourist industry; hotels, motels, resorts, restaurants, attractions, and retail developments exist in abundance to serve visitors.

=== Tourism ===
Hosting over 20 million visitors annually, the Grand Strand is home to an array of tourist attractions, and the area receives a large influx of visitors during all seasons. It is estimated that nearly 100,000 visitors a year are international travelers, including tourists from Canada, Germany and the United Kingdom.

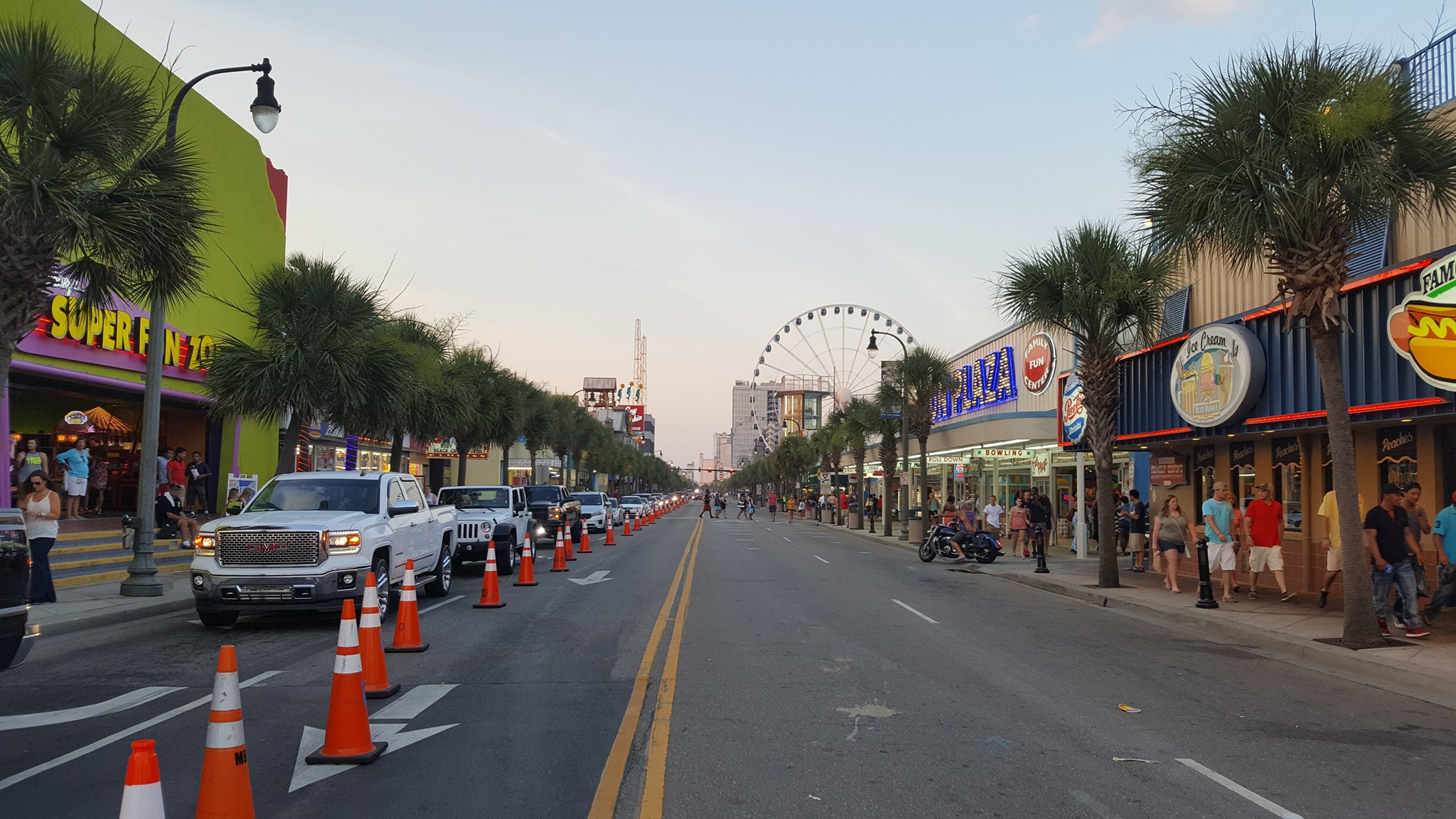
Ocean Boulevard in Myrtle Beach

Myrtle Beach hosts a variety of special conventions, events, and musical concerts. The area's attractions include its beaches and courses, amusement parks, an aquarium, Legends in Concert, retail developments, shopping complexes and over 1,900 restaurants including seafood restaurants. The area also has dinner theaters, nightclubs, and many tourist shops. Myrtle Beach has approximately 425 hotels, with many on the beachfront, and approximately 157 accommodation units in total. The area is also home to over 80 golf courses and over 30 miniature golf courses.

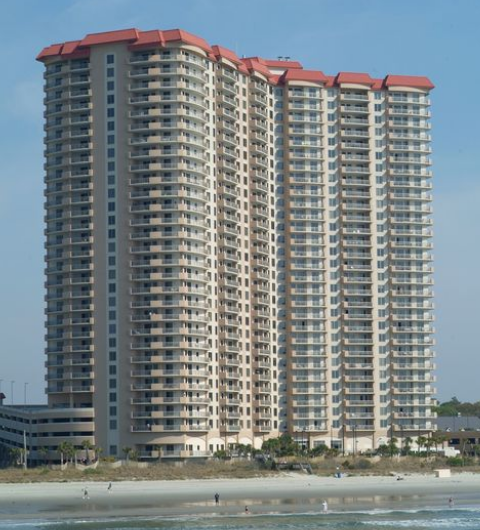
The 29-floor Margate Tower in Kingston Plantation is the tallest building in the Myrtle Beach area.

Live shows are offered year round at theaters including the Alabama Theatre, Carolina Opry, Asher Theater, Calvin Gilmore Theater, Legends in Concert, and Medieval Times Family Dinner Theater. Several shows offer special holiday themed shows.

The Myrtle Beach Boardwalk opened in 2010 and has been recognized as the nation's #3 boardwalk by National Geographic and one of the best US boardwalks by Travel + Leisure magazine. The Myrtle Beach Skywheel opened at the boardwalk in May 2011, and is a 200-foot (61 m) observation wheel, similar to a ferris wheel, with glass gondolas that look over the Atlantic Ocean. This is the first wheel of its kind in the U.S. Pier 14 is by the Boardwalk.

Myrtle Beach State Park, established in 1935, has just under a mile of Grand Strand beach and is a prime location for camping, swimming, hiking, biking, and fishing.

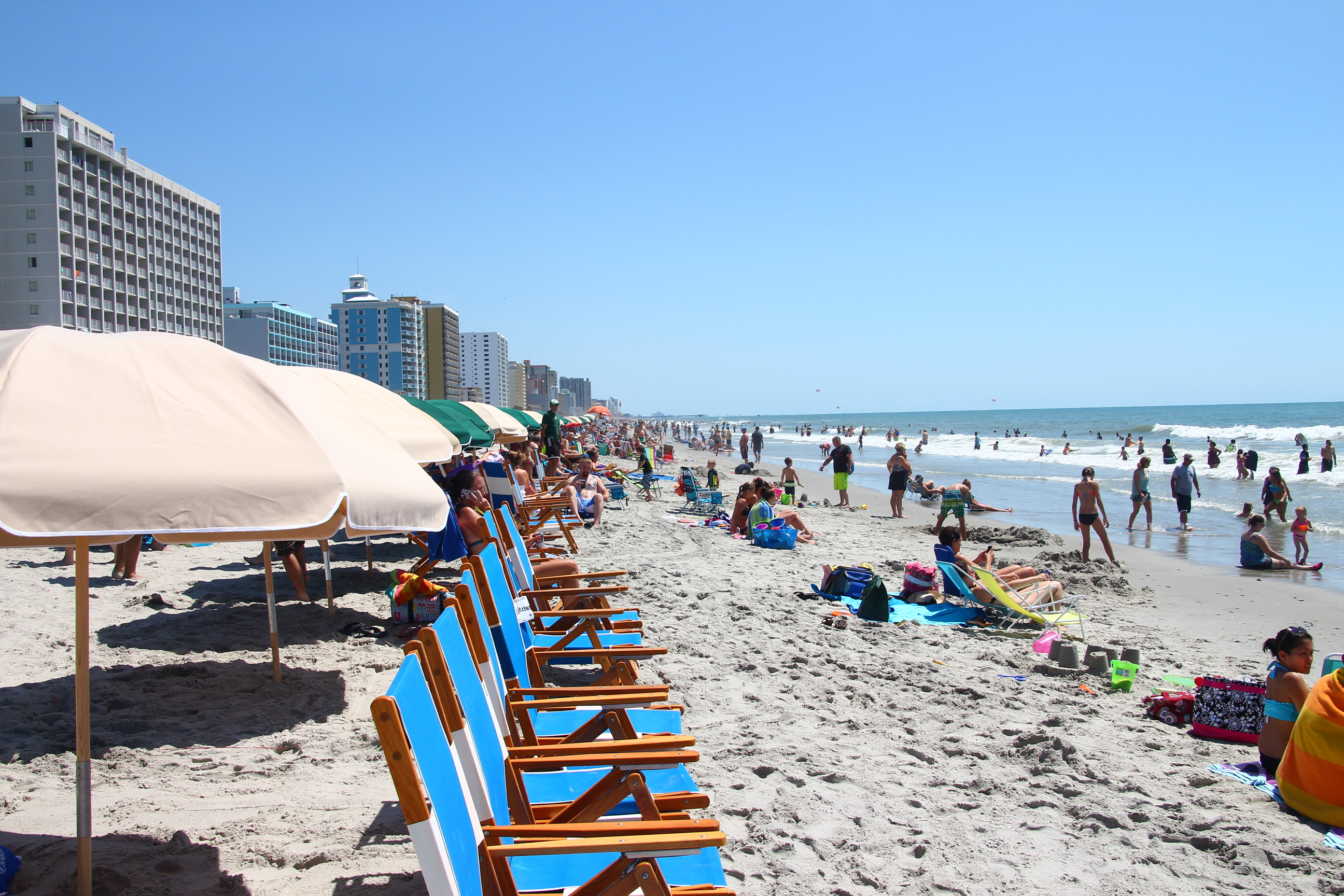
Hotels and tourists along the Myrtle Beach shoreline (July 2014)

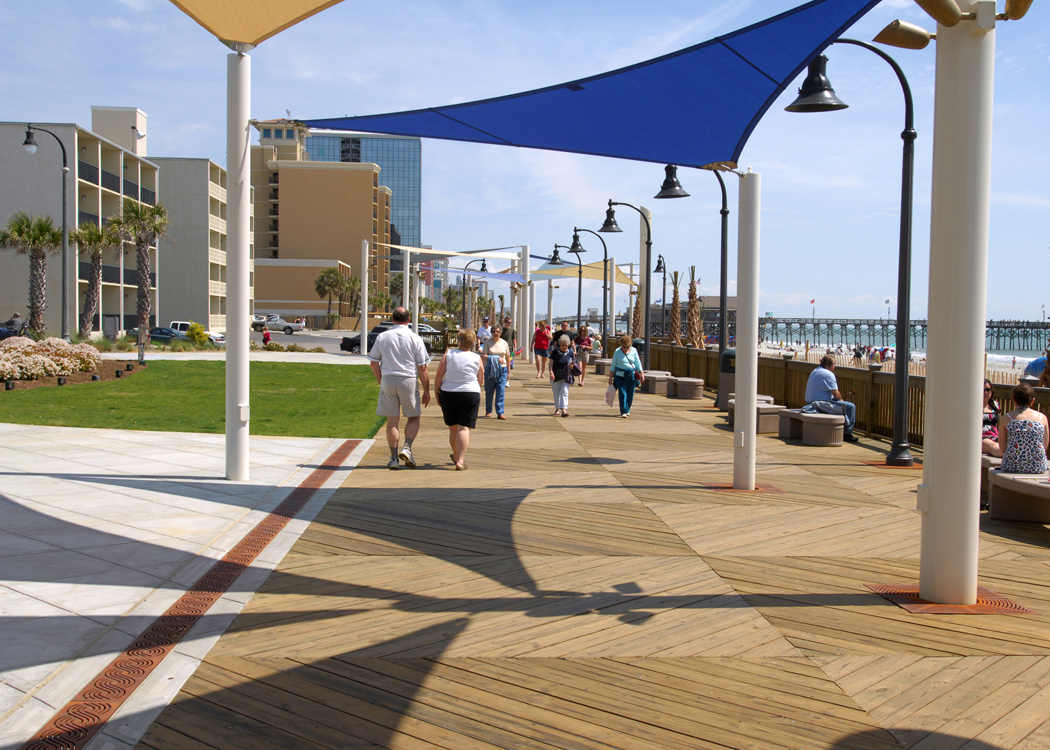
Myrtle Beach Boardwalk

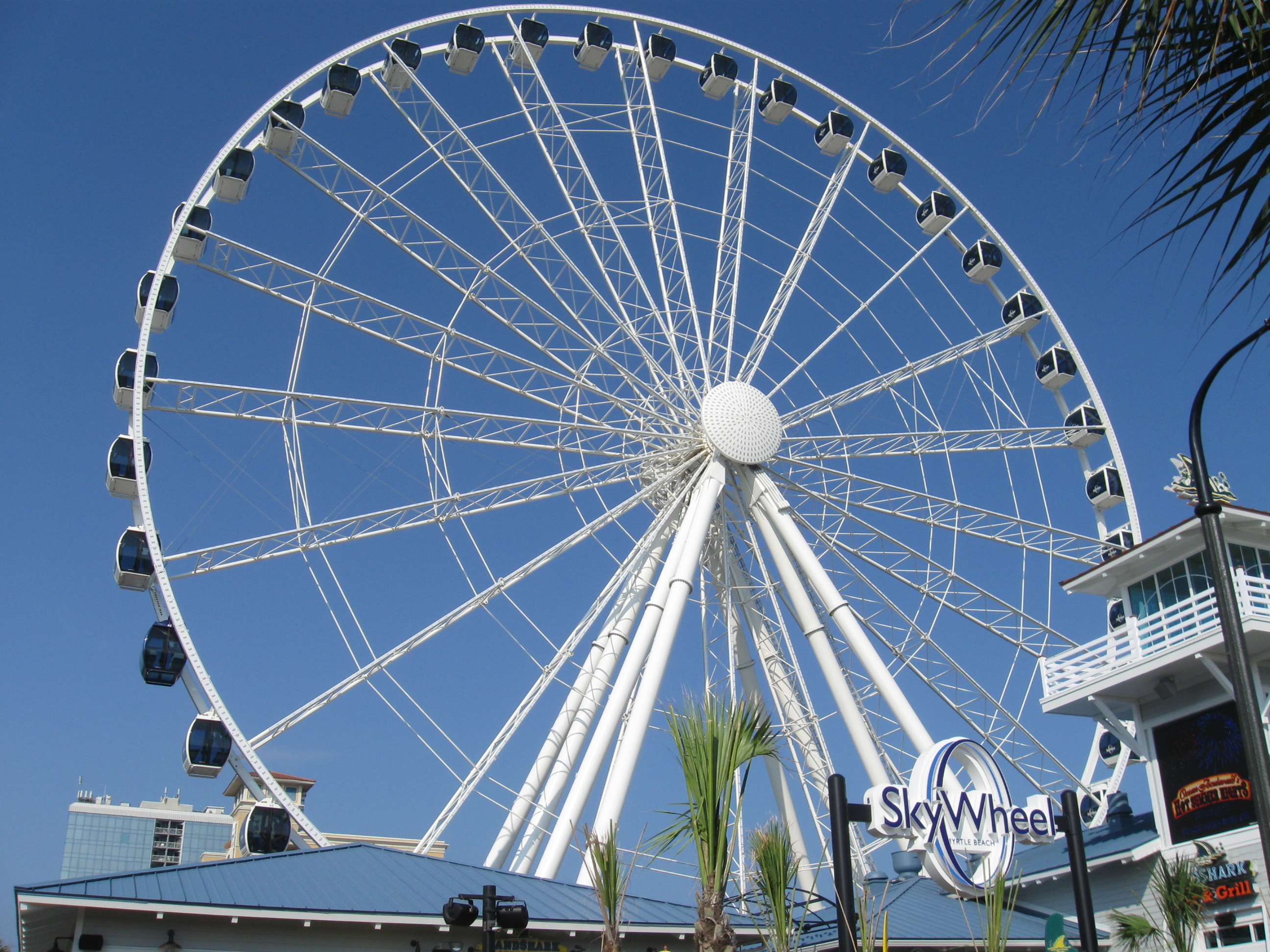
Myrtle Beach SkyWheel

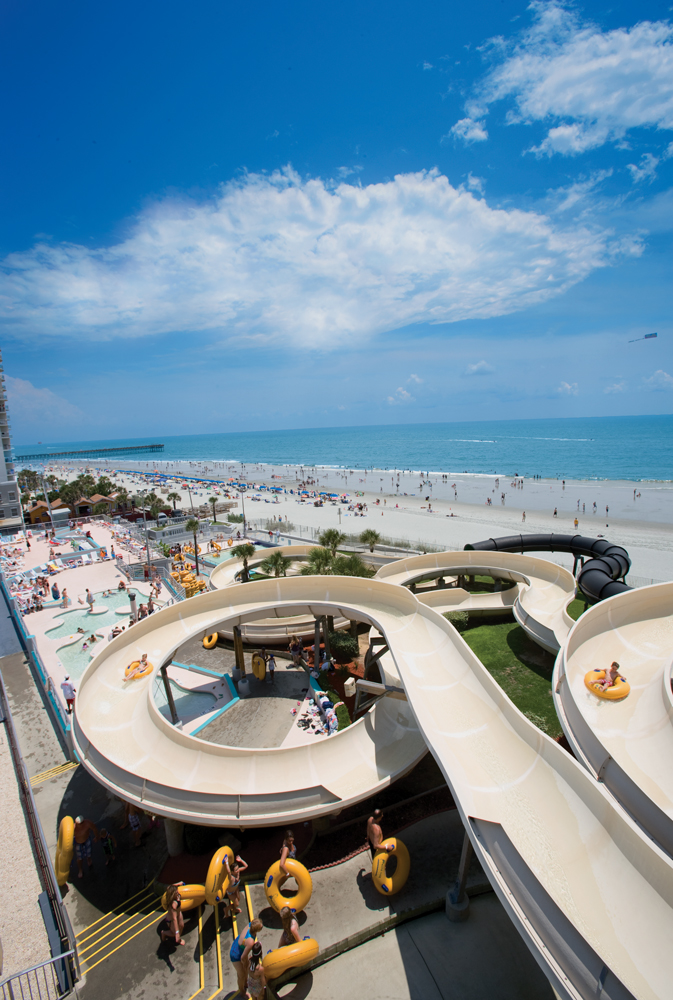
Splashes Oceanfront Water Park

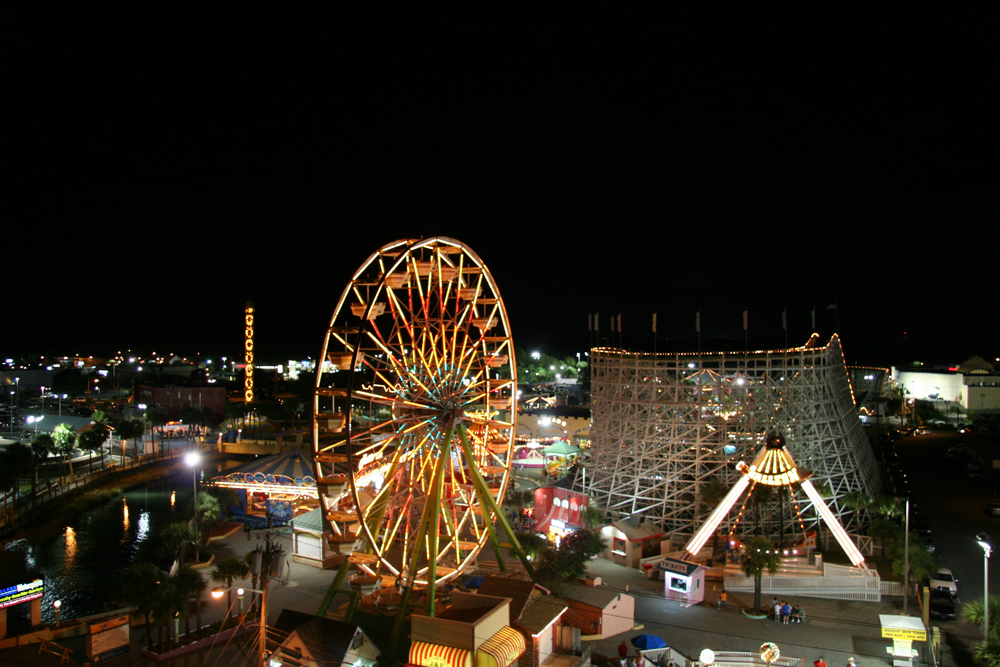
Family Kingdom Amusement Park opened in 1966

The Myrtle Beach Convention Center is a large facility that hosts a variety of meetings, conferences, exhibits, and special events every year. The expansive center, which opened in 2003, has a Sheraton hotel and resort.

==== Annual events ====
Each March since 1951 during Ontario's spring break, Myrtle Beach has hosted Canadian-American Days, also known as Can-Am Days. Tens of thousands of tourists flock to the area for a week's worth of special events. Myrtle Beach is also home to Coastal Uncorked, a food and wine festival held in the late spring annually. The city hosts Sun Fun Festival early each June. Later in June, Myrtle Beach is a popular destination for recently graduated high school seniors for Senior Week.

The Carolina Country Music Fest is an outdoor country music festival that takes place in June of each year and was founded in 2015 by Charlotte-based company Full House Productions. Due to concerns surrounding the coronavirus pandemic the festival wasn't held in 2020, but is scheduled to return in 2021 and take place on 10–13 June 2021.

Myrtle Beach International Airport serves the city and surrounding area. With regular flights to and from destinations such as Atlanta, Boston, Detroit, Fort Lauderdale, New York and Washington, the airport is well connected for both domestic and international tourists. It also serves as a seasonal gateway to and from the likes of Chicago, Dallas and Toronto.

The city is between Wilmington and Charleston with US 17 serving as the main transport link for those journeying between those cities.

==== Thong bikini ban ====
Thongs (or any swimwear revealing any portion of the buttocks) are not permitted in public in Myrtle Beach, including all beaches. Violators of the ban may be arrested, jailed, or fined. The city's "thong ordinance" has been in effect since the 1990s.

===== Motorcycle rallies =====
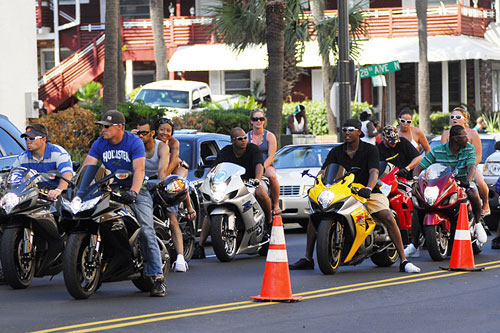
Riders in traffic at the 2008 Atlantic Beach Bikefest

Myrtle Beach Bike Week, also called "Harley Bike Week", is a week-long motorcycle rally first held in 1940, the same year Kings Highway was paved. The event has attracted as many as 200,000 visitors to the city every May. Black Bike Week, founded in 1980, takes place the weekend around Memorial Day Weekend and is the largest African American motorcycle rally in the US and attracts as many as 400,000 visitors. The event was created in response to a history of discrimination against African-American visitors and riders to Myrtle Beach and the Grand Strand Area.

The Myrtle Beach government created 15 new laws aimed at preventing all sanctioned motorcycle events within the city in response to controversy including accusations of racism by African-American riders during their event and complaints of lawlessness and poor behavior during all highly attended events. Several lawsuits by the National Association for the Advancement of Colored People (NAACP) against Myrtle Beach businesses were settled with agreements that discrimination cease, compensation be given to some plaintiffs, and employees be given diversity training. The NAACP suit against the City of Myrtle Beach was settled in 2006 without the city paying damages, but with the agreement police would use the same traffic control rules during both the black and the white motorcycle rallies.

The South Carolina Supreme Court in June 2010 unanimously overturned one of the 15 ordinances, which had required all motorcyclists to wear helmets, on the grounds that the state law, requiring helmets only for riders under age 21, cannot be preempted by a city ordinance. In addition, the Court ruled that the ordinance created undue confusion, and that the city itself had invalidated their own helmet law and some other ordinances in a subsequent amendment. The law had been challenged by a group of motorcyclists and a group of Myrtle Beach businesses called BOOST, Business Owners Organized to Support Tourism, who opposed the city's anti-motorcycle tourism policy.

=== Shopping ===
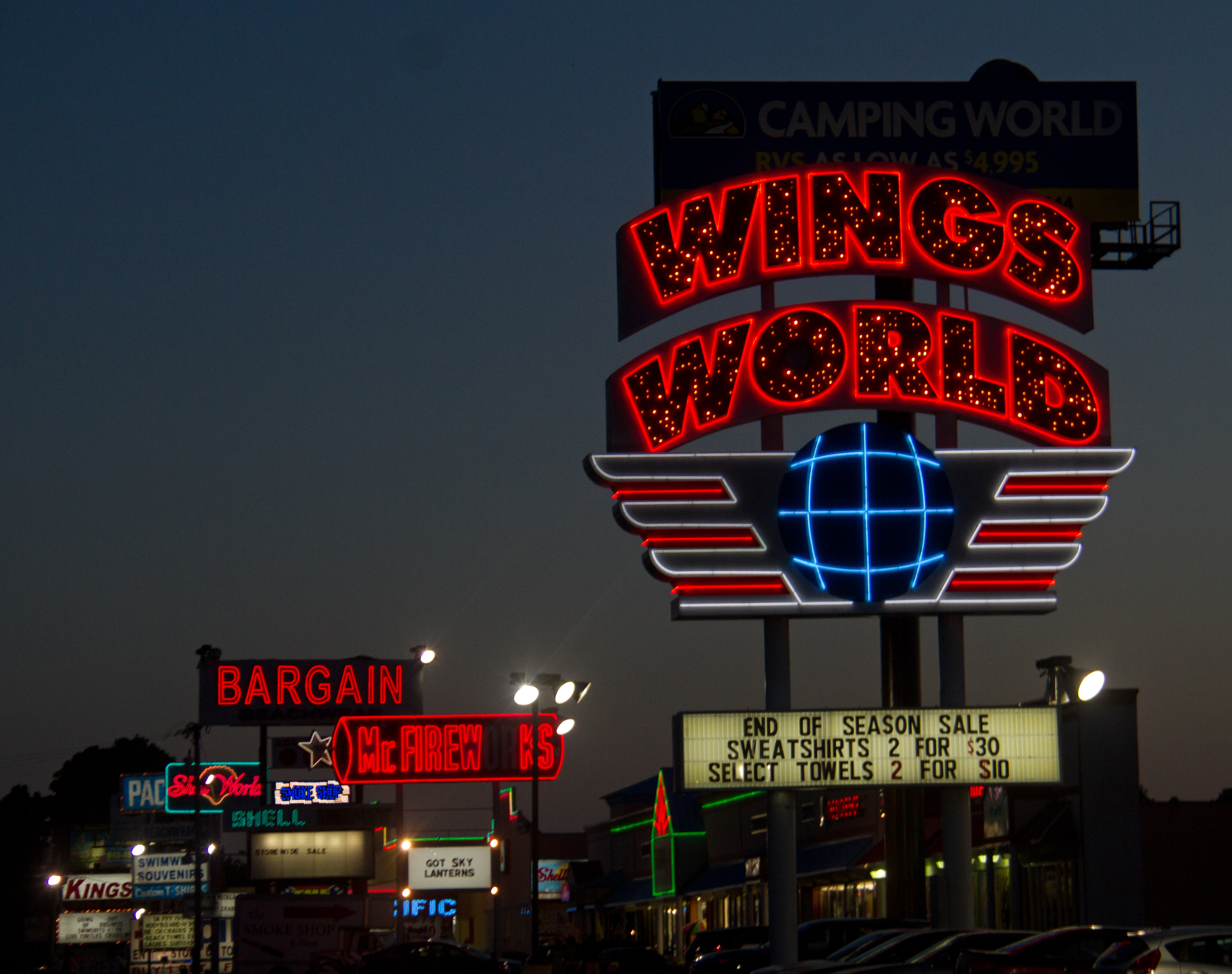
Myrtle Beach is home to a large number of beachwear shops.

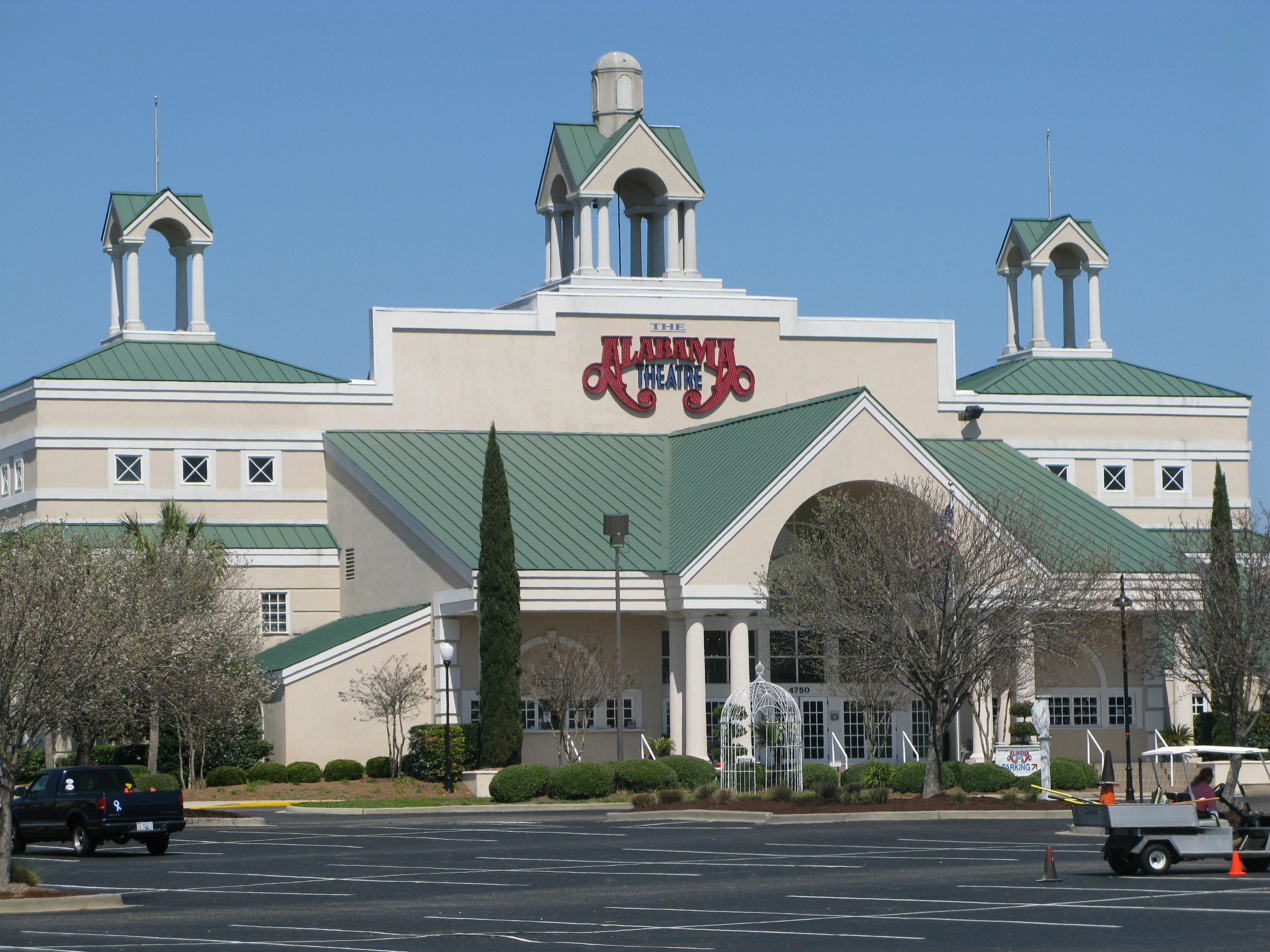
The Alabama Theatre at Barefoot Landing

Major shopping malls in Myrtle Beach include:

- Barefoot Landing is an outdoor shopping complex that consists of several divided sections on filled land over top of Louis Lake, next to the Intracoastal Waterway. It contains many stores and attractions such as House of Blues (opened in 1997) and the Alabama Theatre. Opened in 1988.
- Broadway at the Beach is a shopping complex set on 350 acres (1.4 km^{2}) along the US 17 Bypass surrounding the 23-acre (9.3 ha) Lake Broadway. It is the largest festival entertainment complex in South Carolina.
- Coastal Grand Mall opened in 2004 and is the second largest indoor malls in the state. The mall, which has indoor and outdoor shopping areas, has a gross leasable area of 1,047,732 square feet (97,300 m^{2}). The single-story facility has five anchor stores (including Sears, Belk, JCPenney, and Dillard's), a 14-screen movie theater, a food court, and roughly 170 stores in total.
- The Market Common is a lifestyle district housing several upscale retail and apartments. It is on the site of the former Myrtle Beach Air Force Base.
- Myrtle Beach Mall is 525,385 square feet (48,800 m^{2}), and has three anchor stores, Bass Pro Shops, Belk and JCPenney. The single-story mall also has a 12-screen movie theater, a food court, and other specialty stores. It used to be known as Colonial Mall, and was built as Briarcliffe Mall.
- Tanger Outlets is a shopping outlet center. There are two locations, one near Briarcliffe Acres and one near Carolina Forest.

== Sports ==
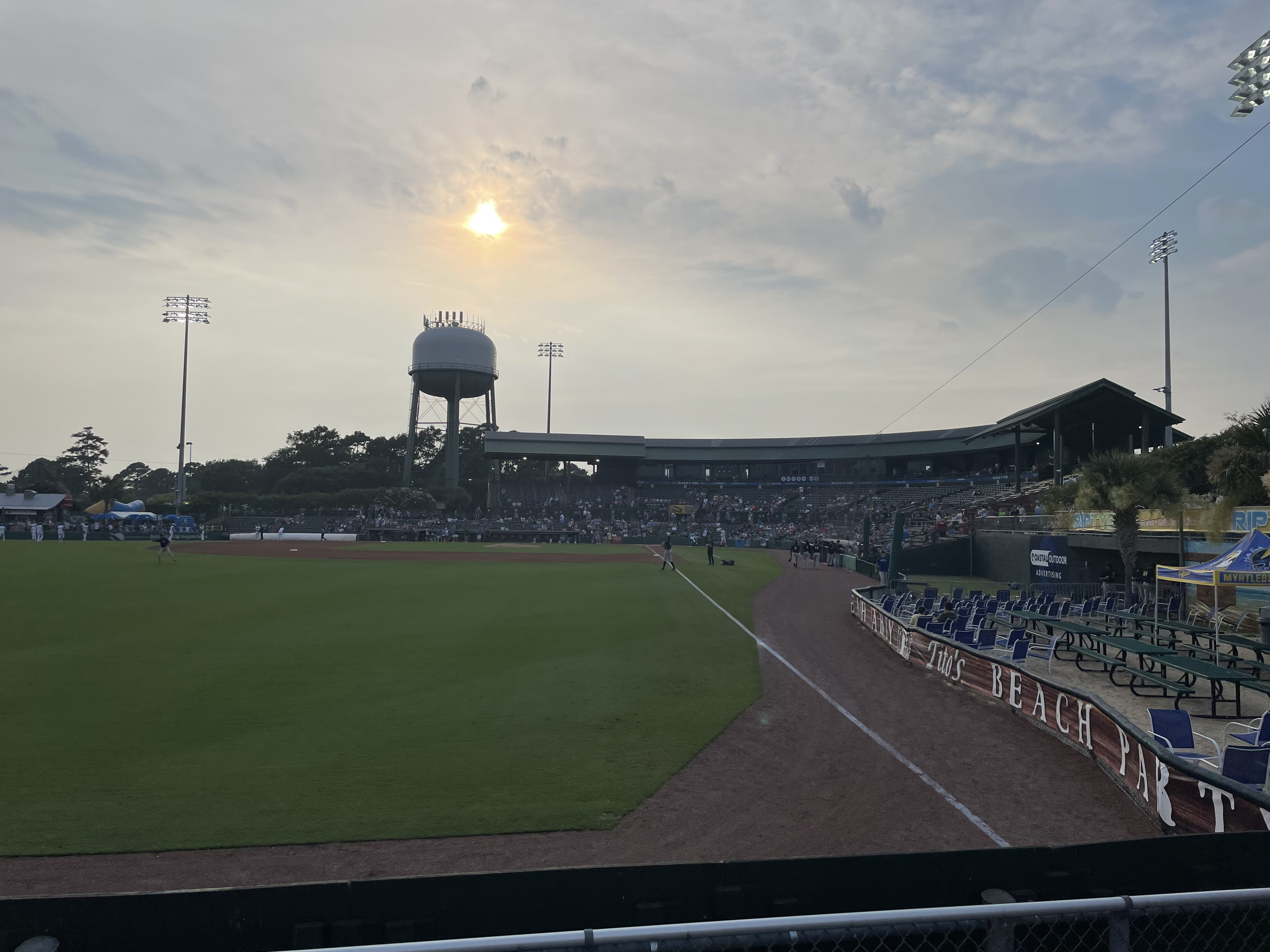
Pelicans Ballpark home of the Myrtle Beach Pelicans

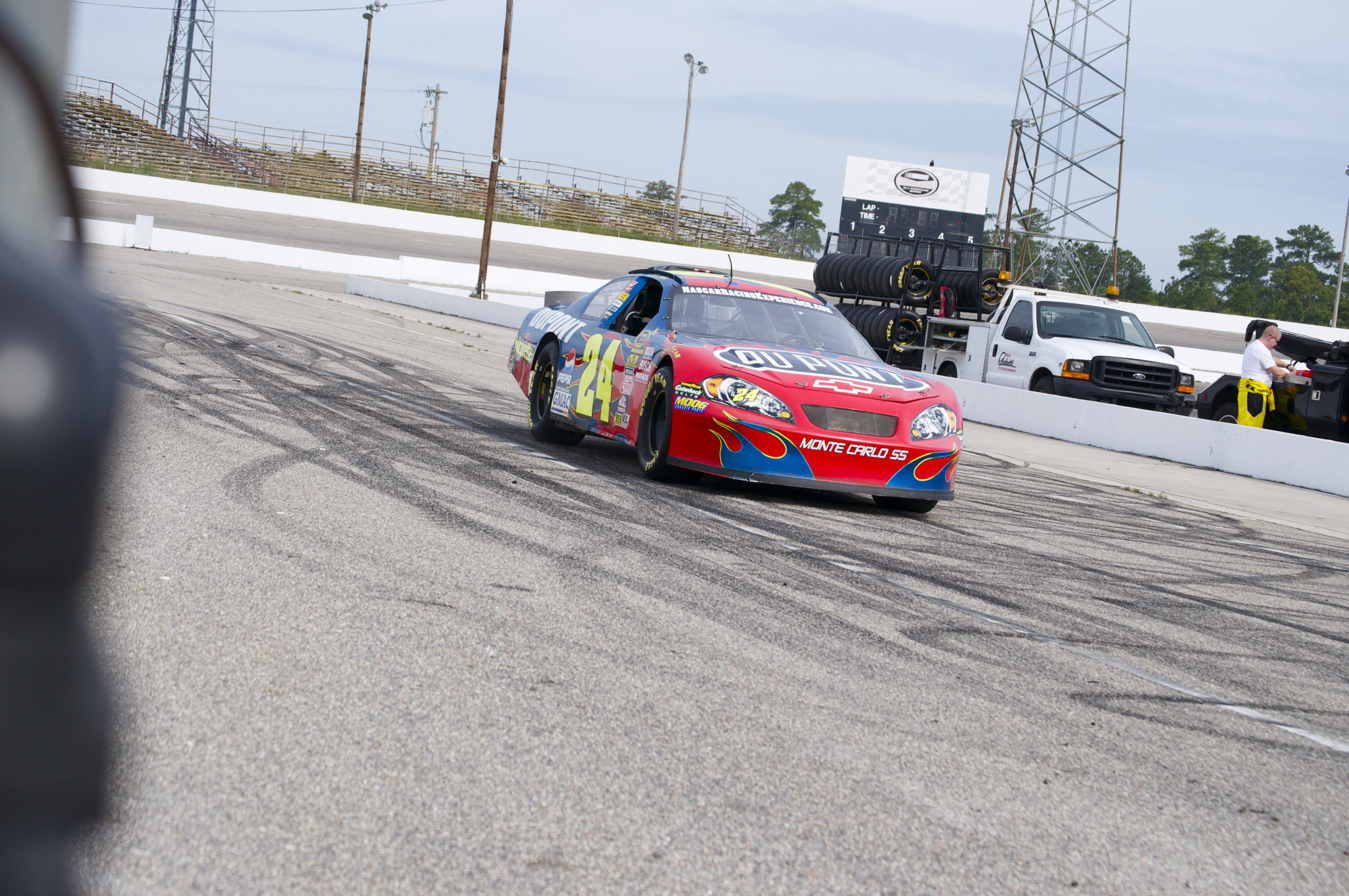
Myrtle Beach Speedway

=== Golf ===
The area is home to numerous golf courses and mini-golf courses along the Grand Strand and further inland. Myrtle Beach has been called the "Golf Capital of the World" because of the roughly 100 golf courses there, the record 4.2 million rounds played, and many miniature golf courses. 3.2 million total rounds of golf were played in 2017, down a "few hundred rounds" from a decade earlier. The number of golf courses more than doubled to over 120 over a 20-year period before declining late in the first decade of the 21st century. Tiger Woods declared Myrtle Beach "the mecca of golf" when visiting in 1997. The majority of the area's golf courses are public. The Grand Strand is home of "Hootie and the Blowfish Day After the Masters Tournament". Extensive Chinese investment to the Myrtle Beach area golf market has resulted in a significant surge of Chinese tourists to the area and also resulted in 25+ golf courses being owned and/or operated by Chinese nationals.

Some of the notable golf courses and/or resorts include Barefoot Resort & Golf and TPC of Myrtle Beach.

=== Long-distance running events ===
From 1998 to 2009 and again starting in 2011 (no Saturday races were held in 2010 due to snow), the area hosted the Bi-Lo Myrtle Beach Marathon presented by Chick-fil-A, every February featuring (since 2004) the Friday night Royal Bank of Canada 5K and the Saturday Dasani Half Marathon and Bi-Lo Marathon (from 1998 until 2008, a relay was held but dropped because of the popularity of the other events). Marathon day draws the limit of 6,000 runners annually (2,500 full, 3,500 half) and results usually in an unusual dawn as the race starts before dawn (6:30 am) in order to finish by 2:30 pm.

=== Athletic teams and facilities ===
Myrtle Beach is home to the Myrtle Beach Pelicans, a Carolina League baseball team and a Chicago Cubs farm franchise. It was also home to the Myrtle Beach Mutiny, a pro soccer team playing in the Premier Development League until 2018.

Pelicans Ballpark is the home field of the Myrtle Beach Pelicans. It opened in 1999. It is the finish point of the Bi-Lo Myrtle Beach Marathon. Pelicans Ballpark is also home of the annual "Baseball at the Beach" collegiate baseball tournament. Hosted by Coastal Carolina University each year, the tournament pits participating NCAA Division I baseball programs in the United States.

=== NASCAR ===
NASCAR-sanctioned Stock car racing was held at Myrtle Beach Speedway, a .538-mile (866 m), semi-banked, asphalt-paved oval track lon US 501. Drivers in the Late Model classes will compete (against those of Greenville-Pickens Speedway) for the South Carolina Championship in the NASCAR Whelen All-American Series. South Carolina Champions' scores will be calculated against other state and provincial champions for a continental championship. It hosted the 2010 UOA Nationals where 8 collegiate ultimate teams from 5 conferences would be represented.

On August 15, 2020, the track held its final race, as the track was closed and demolished soon after, it is now the site of new townhomes.

== Government ==
The city of Myrtle Beach has a council-manager government. The mayor sits as a council member-at-large and presides over city council meetings. If the mayor cannot preside over a city council meeting, the mayor pro-tem is the presiding officer of the meeting until such time as the mayor returns to the seat. The city manager is responsible for the administration and the day-to-day operation of all municipal services and city departments. The city manager also maintains intergovernmental relationships with federal, state, county and other local governments. The city of Myrtle Beach reformed into a council-manager government system in 1974 under the administration of Mayor Bob Hirsch and city manager David Stradinger, who moved away from the city's former strong-mayor form of government.

=== Mayors ===
Mark Kruea is the mayor of Myrtle Beach. He has served since 2026.

Name	From	To
Dr. W. Leroy Harrelson	1938	1939
Ben M. Graham	1939	1941
Dr. W. Leroy Harrelson	1941	1943
O.C. Callaway	1943	1947
H.W. Tallevast	1947	1949
J.N. Ramsey	1949	1954
Ernest W. Williams	1954	1955
W.E. Cameron	1956	1959
Mark W. Garner	1960	1974
Bob Hirsch	1974	1978
Eric Ficken	1978	1982
Robert M. Grissom	1982	1998
Mark Struthers McBride	1998	2006
John Rhodes	2006	2018
Brenda Bethune	2018	2026
Mark Kruea	2026	present

== Education ==
=== Primary and secondary education ===
Public schools

Horry County is served by a single public school district. Horry County Schools educates around 40,000 students and is the third largest school district in South Carolina.

Charter schools include:

- Bridgewater Academy (K–8)
- Coastal Leadership Academy (9–12)

Private schools

Below is a list of private schools within or near the city of Myrtle Beach.

- Calvary Christian School (PK–12)
- Chabad Academy (PK–7)
- Christian Academy of Myrtle Beach (K–12)
- Holy Trinity Catholic School (PK–5)
- Myrtle Beach Seventh-Day Adventist Christian School (K–8)
- North Myrtle Beach Christian School (PK–12)
- Risen Christ Christian Academy (PK–12)
- St. Andrew Catholic School (K–8)
- St. Elizabeth Ann Seton Catholic High School (6–12)
- St. Michael Catholic School (K–8)
- Valorous Academy (PK–12)

=== Higher education ===
Myrtle Beach has the following college and post-secondary schools:

- Golf Academy of America
- Palmetto School of Career Development – Myrtle Beach campus
- Horry-Georgetown Technical College – Myrtle Beach campus (main campus in Conway)
- Webster University – Myrtle Beach campus

== Media ==
=== Television ===
The Grand Strand and Florence, South Carolina, share a common defined market by Nielsen Media Research in Horry, Marion, Dillon, Darlington, Marlboro, Scotland, Robeson, and Florence counties. Two major stations are licensed to Myrtle Beach: NBC affiliate WMBF-TV 32 and Fox affiliate WFXB 43. Myrtle Beach is also served by PBS member stations WHMC/WJPM-TV 23/33, licensed respectively to Conway and Florence, and two commercial stations licensed to Florence: CBS affiliate WBTW 13 (with MyNetworkTV on DT2) and ABC affiliate WPDE-TV 15, (with The CW on 15.2). WBTW has moved most of its operations to Myrtle Beach, while WPDE is now based in Conway.

Channel	Callsign	Affiliation	Branding	Subchannels		Owner
(virtual)	Callsign	Affiliation	Branding	Channel	Programming	Owner
13.1	WBTW (licensed to Florence, South Carolina)	CBS	WBTW News 13	13.2; 13.3; 13.4	MyNetworkTV & Antenna TV; Ion Television; Ion Mystery	Nexstar Media Group
15.1	WPDE-TV (licensed to Florence, South Carolina)	ABC	ABC 15	15.2; 15.3; 15.4	The CW; Comet (TV network); Weather on The 15's	Sinclair Broadcast Group
21.1	WWMB (licensed to Florence, South Carolina)	Roar	WWMB	21.2; 21.3; 21.4	Charge! The Nest; Dabl	Howard Stirk Holdings, but operated by Sinclair Broadcast Group via Shared Service Agreement
23.1	WHMC (licensed to Conway, South Carolina)	South Carolina Educational Television	WHMC	23.2; 23.3. 23.4	SC Channel; ETV World; ETV Kids	South Carolina Educational Television Commission
31.1	WUNU (licensed to Wilmington, North Carolina)	PBS North Carolina	WUNU	31.2; 31.3; 31.4	Rootle; Explorer; NC Channel	University of North Carolina
32.1	WMBF-TV (licensed to Myrtle Beach, South Carolina)	NBC	WMBF News	32.2; 32.3; 32.4; 32.5; 32.6; 32.7	Bounce TV; Palmetto Sports & Entertainment; Laff; Grit; Quest; Ion Plus	Gray Television
43.1	WFXB (licensed to Myrtle Beach, South Carolina)	FOX	WFXB FOX TV	43.2; 43.3; 43.4; 43.5; 43.6; 43.7; 43.8	QVC Over The Air; Start TV; MeTV; Heroes & Icons; True Crime Network; Cozi TV; Story Television	Bahakel Communications

=== Radio ===
The Myrtle Beach area is served by the following full power FM radio stations:

Frequency	Call Sign	Branding	Format
88.3	WMBJ	HIS Radio	Religious
88.9	WKVC	K-Love	Religious
90.1	WHMC	WHMC 90.1	Public radio
90.9	WLGI	Radio Baháʼí	Variety
92.1	WMYB	Energy 92.1	Top 40
92.9	WEGX	Eagle 92.9	Country
93.5	WLQB	El Patron 93.5	Regional mexican
93.9	WGLD	Carolina Country 93.9	Country
94.5	WTKN	Talk 94.5	Conservative talk
94.9	WVCO	94.9 The Surf	Oldies/Beach music
96.1	WKZQ	96.1 WKZQ	Alternative rock
97.7	WWXM	Mix 97.7	Top 40
98.5	WDAI	98.5 Kiss FM	Mainstream urban
99.5	WRNN	Hot Talk WRNN	News/talk
100.3	WSEA	100.3 The Game	Sports
101.1	WPIF	The New 101.1	Oldies
103.1	WSYN	Sunny 103.1	Classic hits/80's
104.1	WYAV	Wave 104.1	Classic rock
104.9	WYNA	BOB-FM	Adult hits
105.5	WWHK	105.5 Hank FM	Classic country
105.9	WEZV	Easy 105.9	Soft adult contemporary
106.5	WLFF	Nash FM	Country
107.1	WRXZ	Rock 107	Mainstream rock
107.9	WGTR	Gator 107.9	Country

Weather radio frequencies: 162.4, 162.5, 162.55
AM radio frequencies: 900, 1050, 1200

=== Newspapers ===
The Sun News has traditionally been the largest daily paper published along the Grand Strand, with a readership base extending from Georgetown, to Sunset Beach. The paper has been in existence since the 1930s and was formerly published by Knight Ridder before that company was bought by The McClatchy Company. Like many newspapers, the paper has declined in recent years due to shifts in readership and financial pressures at its parent company. It stopped local printing operations and downsized its newsroom in May 2020.

Myrtle Beach is also served by The Myrtle Beach Herald, a weekly newspaper that is part of the Waccamaw Publishers group. The Herald also produces a newspaper targeted at tourists called Visit!.

In 2020, Charleston-based The Post and Courier set up an official bureau in Myrtle Beach, after years of attempting to move into the market and purchasing The Georgetown Times, which it merged with the new operation.

== Infrastructure ==
=== Healthcare ===
Grand Strand Medical Center (GSMC) is a 369-bed acute care hospital and Level 1 Adult Trauma Center known for its programs in cardiology, heart surgery, and stroke treatment. It was opened on 21 April 1978 to succeed the former Ocean View Memorial Hospital (1958–1978), the first major hospital in Myrtle Beach. GSMC contains the only cardiac surgery and neurosurgery programs in the greater Myrtle Beach area and was a recipient of the Healthgrades 100 Best Hospitals for Cardiac Surgery in 2012 and 2013. As a teaching hospital, Grand Strand Medical Center is the home of ACGME accredited residency training programs (internal medicine, general surgery, emergency medicine, and family medicine), and hosts rotating medical students from the University of South Carolina and Edward Via College of Osteopathic Medicine (VCOM). Over 270 physicians and 1,400 staff serve at the facility.

=== Transportation ===
==== Air ====
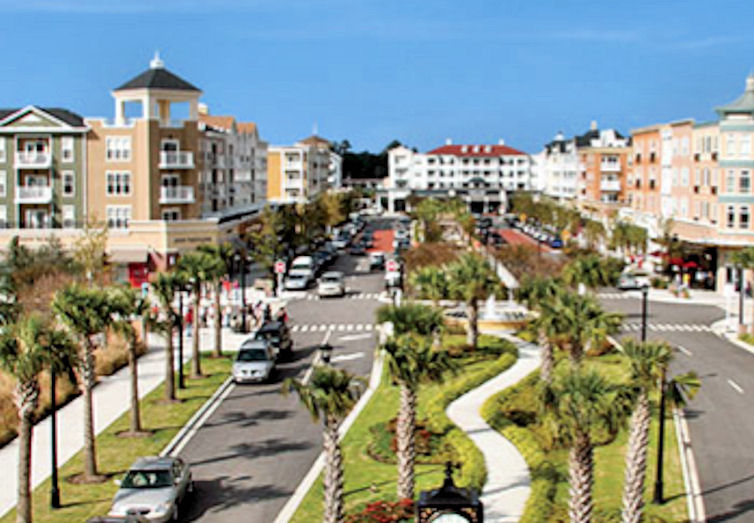
The Market Common was once the location of Myrtle Beach AFB.

Myrtle Beach International Airport is a county-owned public-use airport three miles (4.8 km) southwest of the central business district of Myrtle Beach. It was formerly known as Myrtle Beach Jetport (1974–1989) and is on the site of the former Myrtle Beach Air Force Base. The 11,500-square-foot (1,070 m^{2}) general aviation terminal, opened in May 2010, is located on the opposite side of the airport on Airdrome Street, near The Market Common. The terminal replaced a building previously used as base operations for the Myrtle Beach Air Force Base.

==== Rail ====
The Waccamaw Coast Line Railroad is a 14.1-mile (22.7 km) short-line railroad division of the Baltimore and Annapolis Railroad, extending from a connection with the Carolina Southern Railroad, another division of that company, at Conway to Myrtle Beach. The line was opened in 1900 by the Conway Coast and Western Railroad, a predecessor of the Atlantic Coast Line Railroad. The Seaboard System Railroad sold the line to Horry County in November 1985, and it was operated by the Horry County Railway until October 1987, when the WCLR took over. The Carolina Southern Railroad acquired the WCLR in September 1995, and since then it has been a division of the Baltimore and Annapolis Railroad. Horry County owns the line but leased it to the Carolina Southern Railroad in 2000.

Carolina Southern Railroad is a short line rail operator running on less than 95 miles (153 km) of rail at a maximum speed of 10 mph (16 km/h). It transports mostly freight brought to it from national rail operators. The company makes one scheduled delivery per month into the City of Myrtle Beach. It is off of Main Street in Conway, South Carolina, and is one of the few remaining train depots in South Carolina. It has been painstakingly restored to its former glory and the Carolina Southern Railroad has become one of the frequent destinations for freight services as well as passenger cars and observational locomotives. The railroad was originally erected in late 1886 and the first train steamed into the Conway Depot in December 1887.

The Carolina Southern Railroad stands as a permanent landmark in Southern History. Carolina Southern Railroad is a member of the Carolina Rails system with connections that run from Whiteville, North Carolina, to Mullins, South Carolina, and also from Chadbourn, North Carolina, to Conway. Carolina Southern railroad is also responsible for operation of the Waccamaw Coast Line Railroad, which is a railway that runs from Conway to Myrtle Beach.

On August 30, 2011, Carolina Southern Railroad voluntary shut down because several bridges along the rail were overdue for maintenance. The shutdown caused Carolina Southern Railroad to lay off nearly all of its employees. On May 24, 2012, the Federal Railroad Administration commenced a bridge inspection on the CSR and the Waccamaw Coastline Railroad (the Horry County portion of rail). Fifty-two of 187 bridges were inspected and seven had critical defects. On May 26, 2011, the CSR voluntarily ceased operation, so that they could bring in a certified bridge engineer to inspect the seven critical bridges and prepare a plan for their repairs. Based on the engineer's recommendations, CSR made the necessary repairs on the bridges and CSR resumed operations August 8, 2011. The FRA returned to inspect the bridges and made a recommendation that CSR cease operations until all bridge repairs were completed. There are efforts to bring the railroad back online.

In 2015, railroad operator RJ Corman acquired the former CSR line and re-opened it freight service in early April 2016.

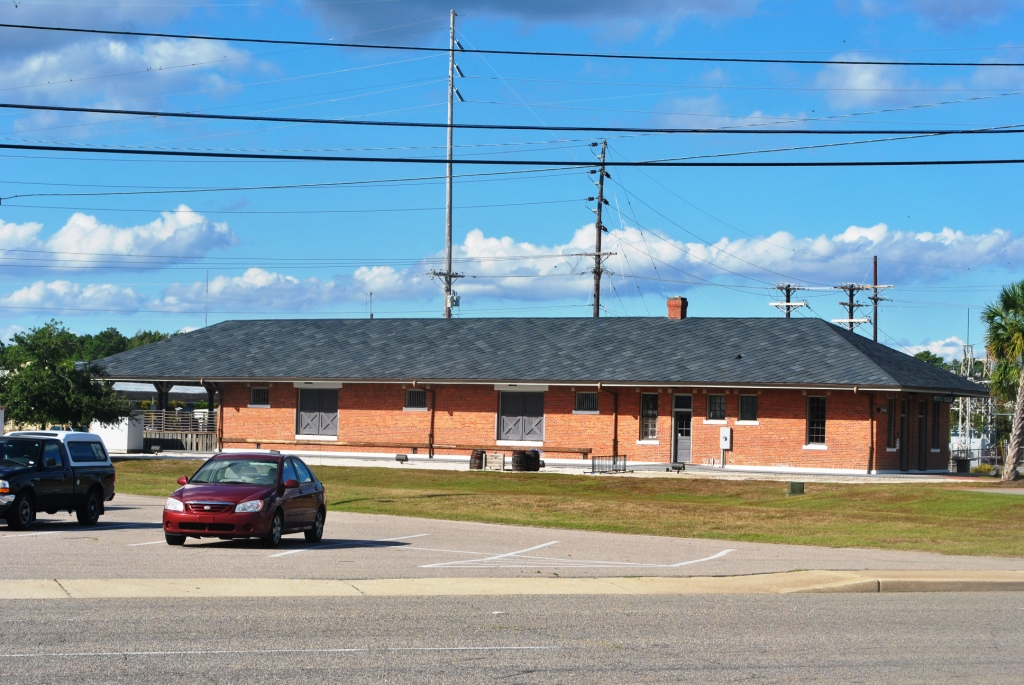
Former Myrtle Beach ACL station

Until 1955 the Atlantic Coast Line Railroad ran passenger rail service from the Myrtle Beach Station to Chadbourn, where a connection could be made to interstate ACL train service.

==== Roads ====
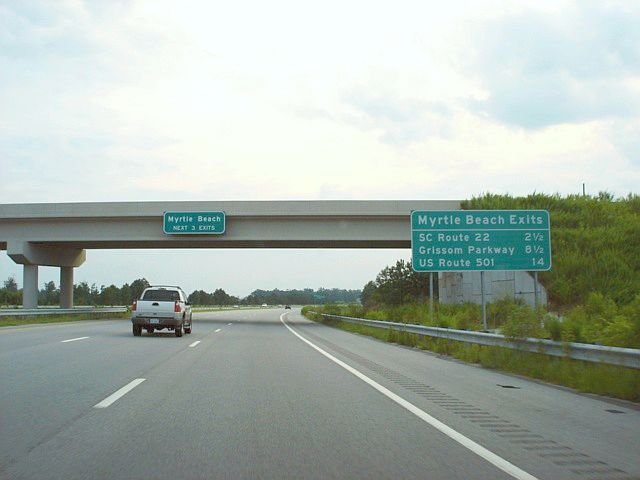
SC 31 serves as a bypass for a majority of the Grand Strand.

- Future I-73
- Future I-74
- US 17
- US 17 Bus.
- US 501
- SC 31
- Farrow Parkway
- Grissom Parkway
- Harrelson Boulevard
- Ocean Boulevard

Within the last decade, new roads have been created to ease congestion caused by the yearly influx of visitors. Most of these roads follow the Metro Loop Road Plan, organized in 1997 to improve the traffic flow of Myrtle Beach. Some of the roads included have either been funded through Road Improvement Development Effort (RIDE I) funding or through the City of Myrtle Beach.

RIDE II plans include the third phase of SC 31, a graded separation of Farrow Parkway and US 17 Bypass at the back gate of the former Air Force base, and many other projects. The county is debating where to allocate the $400 million generated through a proposed 1-cent sales tax. Other road projects in Horry County, including some in Aynor and Conway, will be included when voted upon.

Plans exist for Myrtle Beach to be served by two interstates, I-73 and I-74. The Robert Edge Parkway will connect I-74 to Downtown North Myrtle Beach.

==== Mass transit ====
Myrtle Beach is served by the Coast RTA and the Pee Dee Regional Transportation Authority.

== Notable people ==
- Sigmund Abeles, figurative artist
- Robert Abraham, NFL linebacker
- Ryan Arambula, professional soccer player
- Meher Baba, spiritual master who established the Meher Spiritual Center near Myrtle Beach
- Steve Bailey, bassist
- Robert H. Brooks, founder of Naturally Fresh, Inc. and Hooters of America chains
- Lester Brown, CFL running back
- Dusty Button, ballet dancer
- Shane Carruth, filmmaker
- Brandon Frye, NFL offensive tackle
- Everett Golson, CFL quarterback
- Madison Iseman, actress
- Anthony James, character actor in films and television
- Dustin Johnson, PGA Tour player (attended Coastal Carolina University)
- Ewa Laurance, professional billiards player
- Elliot Levine, keyboardist and member of Heatwave
- Johnathan McClain, actor, screenwriter, and audiobook narrator
- Clint Newton, rugby league player for the Penrith Panthers
- Nancy O'Dell, television personality
- Adam Randall, NFL running back
- Hunter Renfrow, NFL wide receiver, Pro Bowl selection in 2021 and 2x CFP national champion with Clemson
- James M. Richardson, US Army General
- Brian Rutenberg, painter
- Ramon Sessions, NBA player
- Kelly Wearstler, interior designer and judge on Bravo's Top Design

== Sister cities ==
Myrtle Beach has five sister cities, as designated by Sister Cities International:

- Burlington, Ontario, Canada
- Keighley, West Yorkshire, United Kingdom
- Pinamar, Argentina
- Killarney, County Kerry, Ireland
- Tiberias, Israel

== See also ==
- List of municipalities in South Carolina
