= Myrtle Heights–Oak Park Historic District =

Historic district in South Carolina, United States

- U.S. National Register of Historic Places
- U.S. Historic district
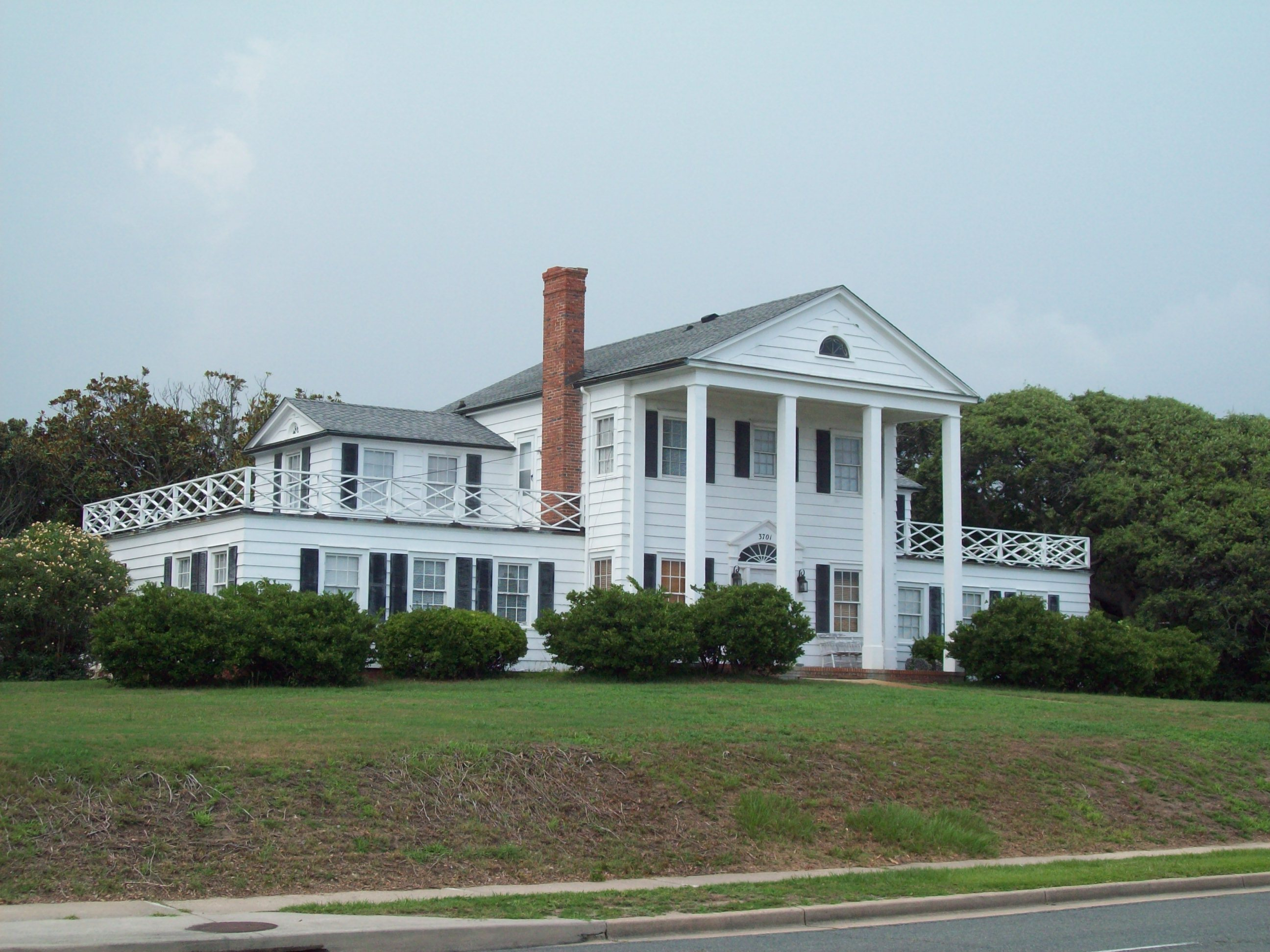
- Myrtle Heights–Oak Park Historic District, 3701 N. Ocean Blvd., June 2010

- Location within South Carolina Location within the United States
- Location: Roughly, N. Ocean Blvd. between 32nd Ave., N. and 46th Ave., N., Myrtle Beach, South Carolina
- Coordinates: 33°42′52″N 78°51′14″W
- Area: 65 acres (26 ha)
- Built: 1933
- Architect: Johnson, John Carroll
- Architectural style: Bungalow/Craftsman, Colonial Revival
- MPS: Myrtle Beach MPS
- NRHP reference No.: 96001217
- Added to NRHP: October 28, 1998

Myrtle Heights–Oak Park Historic District is a national historic district located at Myrtle Beach in Horry County, South Carolina. It encompasses 89 contributing buildings and one contributing site. They relate to the period of residential development in Myrtle Beach following the financial collapse of Woodside Brothers, the company that developed the Ocean Forest Hotel and Country Club in the late 1920s. The Myrtle Heights section was opened in 1933 and the Oak Park Section was opened in 1935. The majority of these oceanside residences were built between about 1925 and 1945 and are two-story frame buildings, many of them with one- or two-story attached garages, two-story detached garage apartments, or one-story attached servants’ quarters. They reflect a variety of popular architectural styles, the most prevalent being Colonial Revival. Also represented are the Classical Revival, Tudor Revival, and Bungalow/Craftsman styles.

It was listed on the National Register of Historic Places in 1998.

== Gallery ==
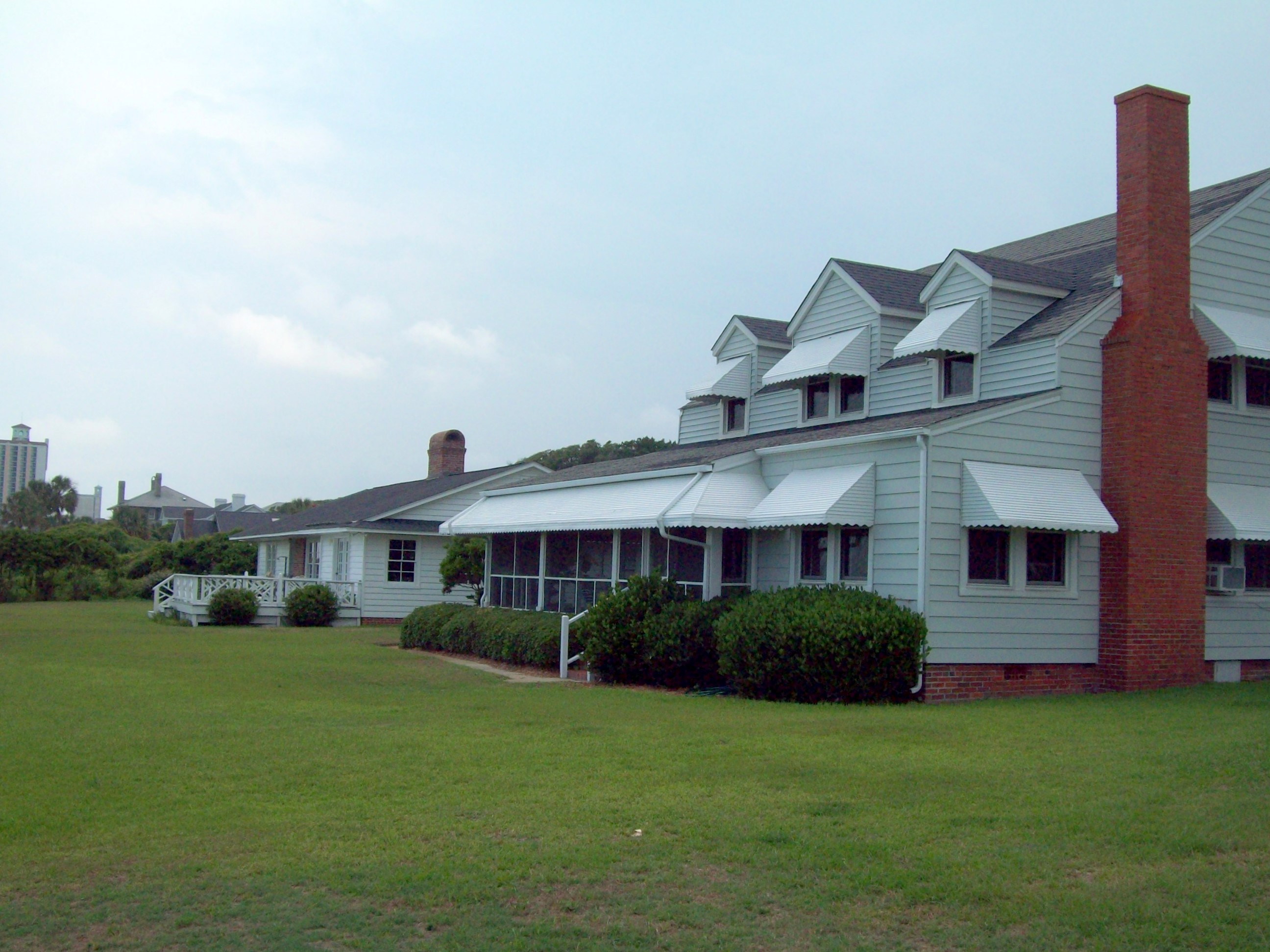
Beachside at 37th Ave N, June 2010
