= Rainbow Court =

- Formerly listed on the U.S. National Register of Historic Places
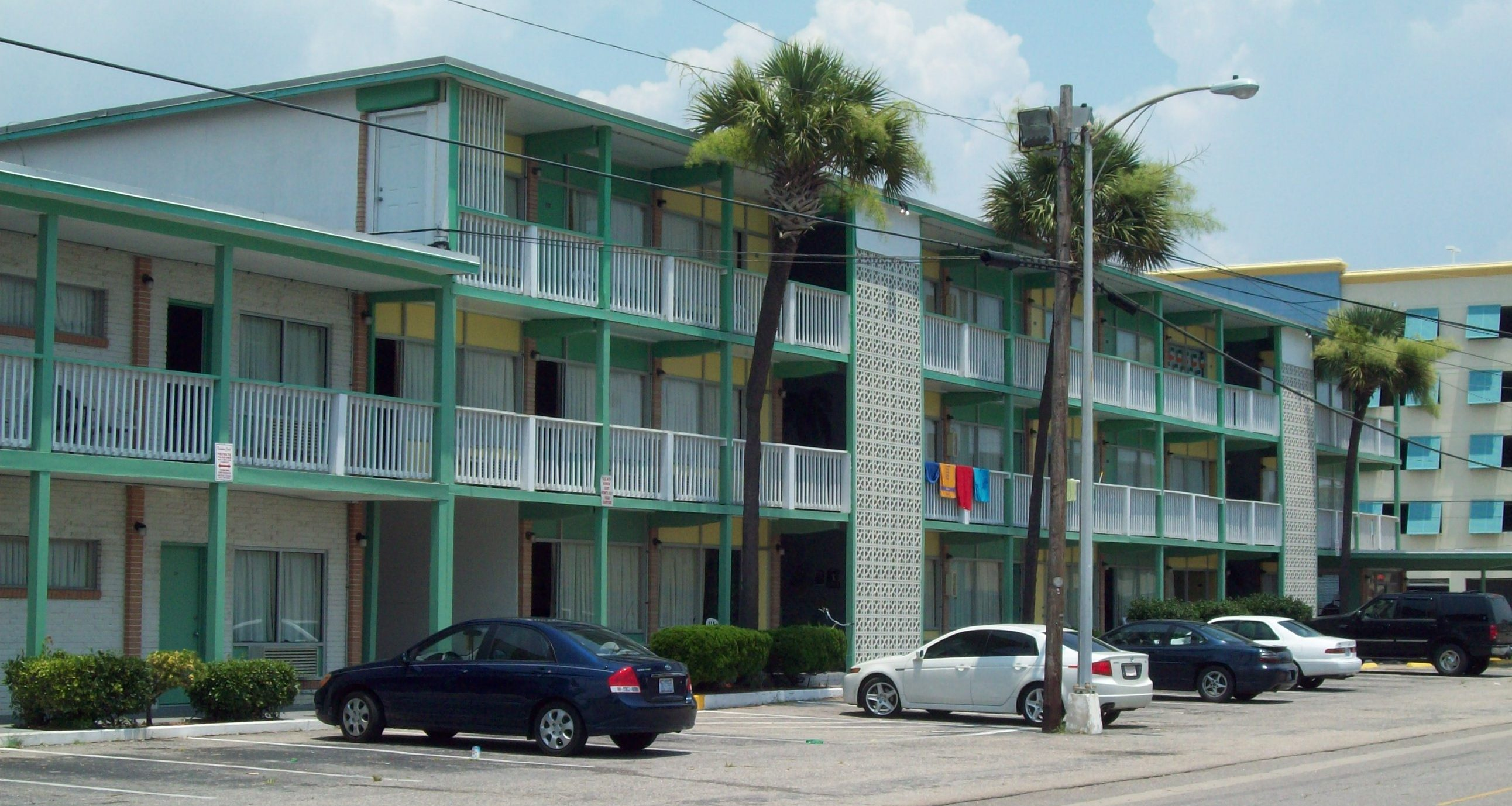
- Rainbow Court, June 2010 (Three story building was non-contributing)

- Location within South Carolina Location within the United States
- Location: 405 Flagg St., Myrtle Beach, South Carolina
- Coordinates: 33°41′16.7″N 78°53′5.1″W
- Area: less than one acre
- Built: 1935
- Demolished: 2017
- MPS: Myrtle Beach MPS
- NRHP reference No.: 96001221

Significant dates
- Added to NRHP: November 7, 1996
- Removed from NRHP: February 27, 2020

Rainbow Court was a historic hotel complex located at Myrtle Beach in Horry County, South Carolina. The complex of buildings ranged in dates of construction from 1935 to 1959. The complex included: two motel-type buildings, five beach cottages/boarding houses, and a small house. The buildings were situated around an open court with a swimming pool. There were six contributing buildings. It was one of the few remaining examples of the small-scale, low-rise motels that pre-dated Hurricane Hazel (1954).

It was listed on the National Register of Historic Places in 1996 but was delisted in 2020.

With development planned for the area, including a parking garage and police station at the Rainbow Court location, demolition was planned as of June 2016. Several area motels were abandoned and attracting vagrants. The city and the Myrtle Beach Downtown Redevelopment Corporation had made $10 million available for improvements.

== See also ==
- List of hotels
- List of motels
