= Pleasant Inn =

- U.S. National Register of Historic Places
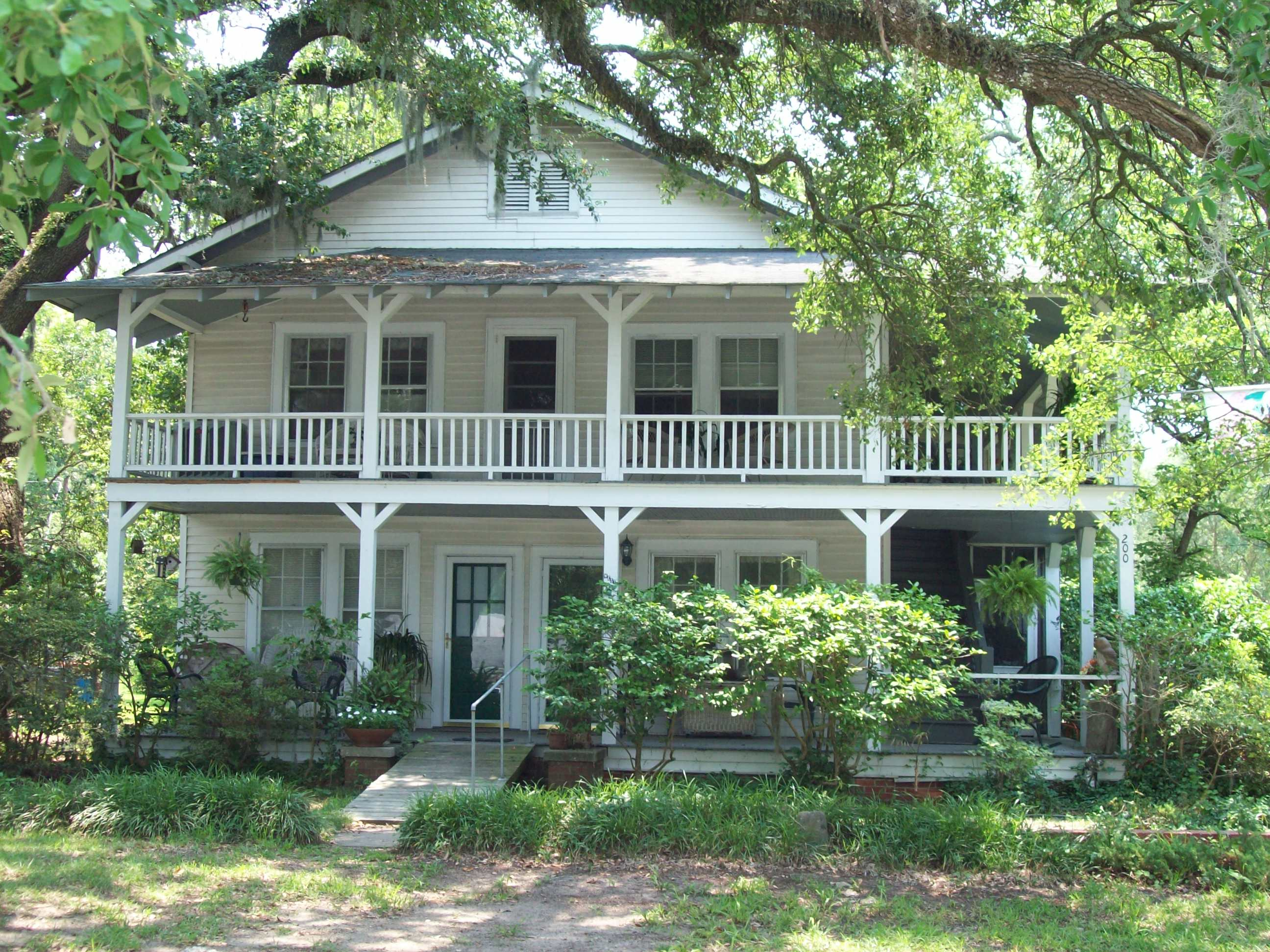
- Pleasant Inn, June 2010

- Location within South Carolina Location within the United States
- Location: 200 Broadway, Myrtle Beach, South Carolina
- Coordinates: 33°41′16″N 78°53′39″W
- Area: less than one acre
- Built: 1927
- Architect: Sessions, Frank
- MPS: Myrtle Beach MPS
- NRHP reference No.: 96001220
- Added to NRHP: November 7, 1996

Pleasant Inn, also known as William F. Simmons House, is a historic boarding house located at Myrtle Beach in Horry County, South Carolina. It was built about 1927 and features a low, two-story height; wood-frame construction; tiered, two-story full facade porches; side stairway leading to upstairs entrance; and rentable rooms for boarders. It also has exposed rafter ends and gable vents. It is one of the few remaining examples of the two-story boarding/guest houses that pre-dates Hurricane Hazel (1954).

It was listed on the National Register of Historic Places in 1996.
