= Pier 14 =

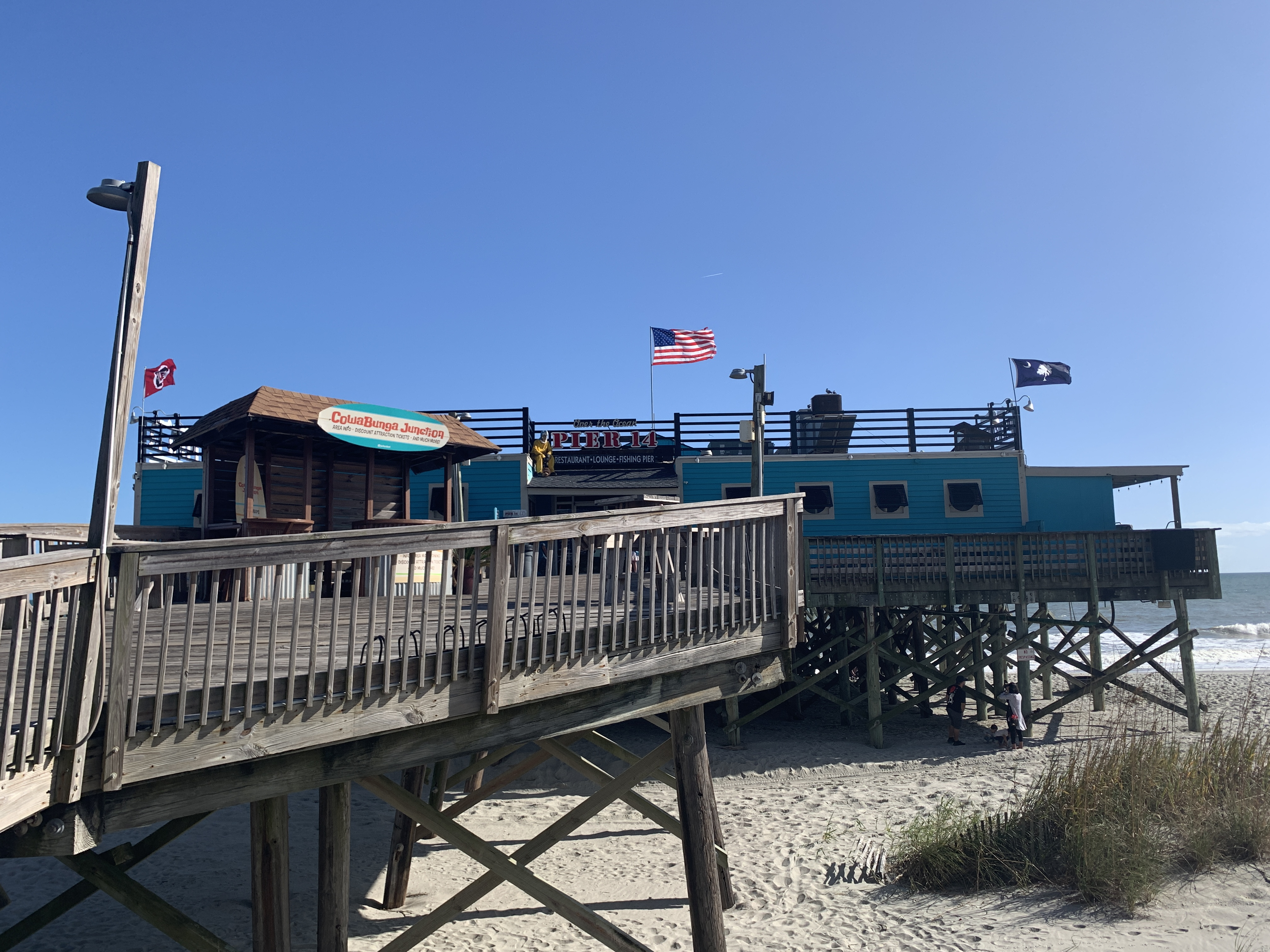
- Interactive map of Pier 14

Restaurant information
- Owner: Bryan Devereux
- Food type: Seafood and American classics
- Dress code: Shirt required of gentlemen after 4:30pm
- Location: 1306 North Ocean Boulevard, Myrtle Beach, South Carolina, United States
- Coordinates: 33.694704°N 78.875137°W

Pier 14 is a restaurant, lounge, and fishing pier in Myrtle Beach, South Carolina. Sandwiched between a strip of hotels and the Myrtle Beach Boardwalk and Promenade, the pier thrives on tourists and vacationers. Pier 14 is a sufficient example of a modern pleasure pier with its draw for tourism and its recreational purposes.

== History ==
Since 1926, a pier has stood in Pier 14's site. Pier 14 in its present form originated in 1984, gaining approval and a 25-year shelf life from the Corps of Engineers, and acting as a night club of sorts. When that conception failed to garner much success, the structure was reconfigured as a restaurant and lounge in 1986. Under the ownership and management of current owner Bryan Devereux, efforts were rewarded.

=== Hurricane Hugo ===
In September, 1989, Hurricane Hugo wreaked havoc on the east coast. Pier 14 suffered many damages, including the loss of its 90-foot pier that extended over the ocean. Devereux stated the pier would need to be closed for at least three weeks in order to repair damages; five months passed before the restaurant reopened in March 1990. Making the most of the rough situation, the owners refurbished the pier and made a few new additions, such as a bait and tackle shop, in 1991. Also attempted was an expansion of the restaurant in 1996, but a special permit to do so was not granted, as regulations concerning the expansion of seaward structures were made stricter in response to Hurricane Hugo. Destroyed piers are allowed to be restored to their original dimensions but not expanded, and since the restaurant was the item in debate, it did not fall under the category of a water-dependent structure.

== Features ==
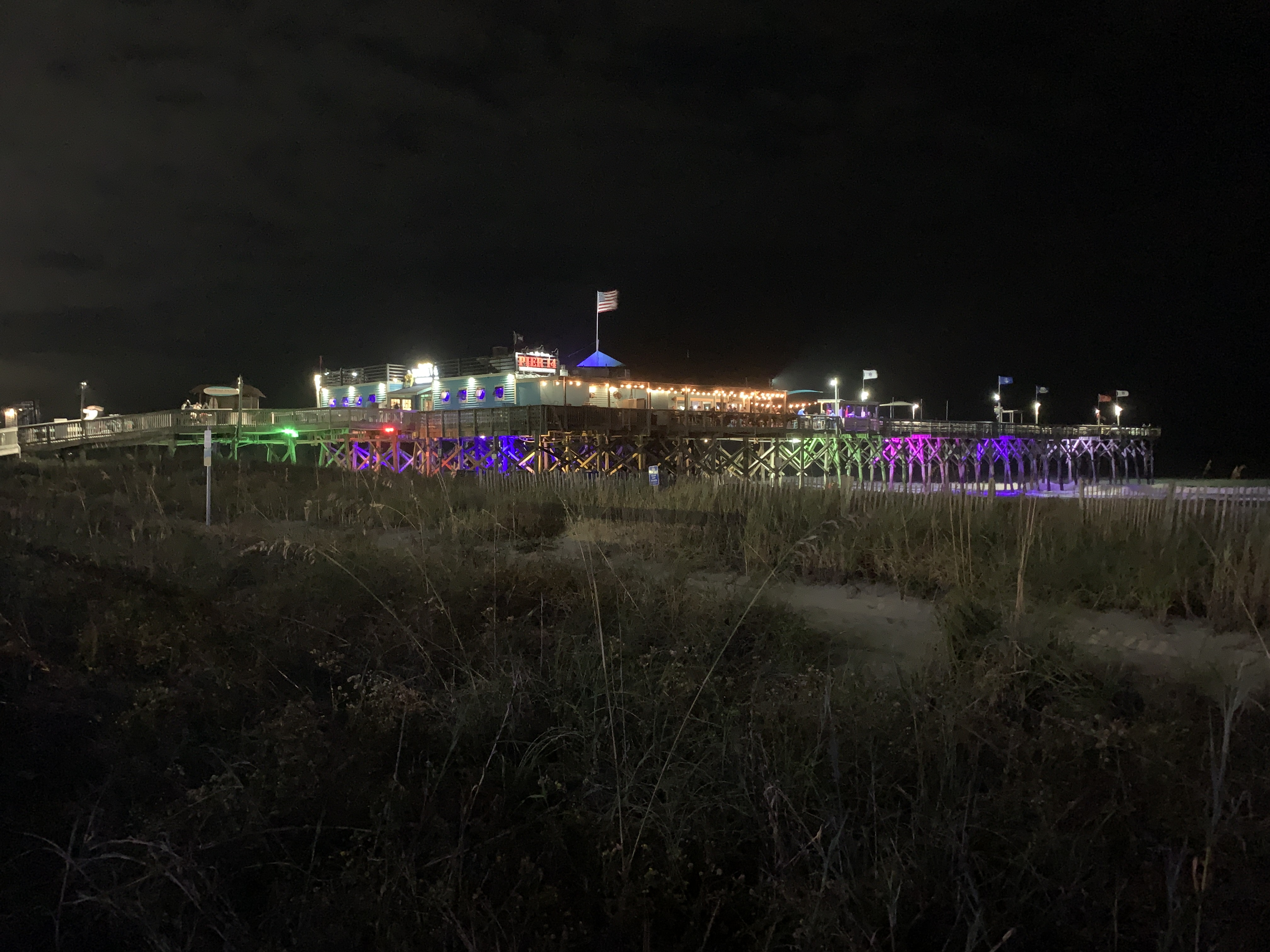
Pier 14 at night

One of ten public piers along the Grand Strand, Pier 14 has benefitted greatly from the opening of the new Myrtle Beach Boardwalk and Promenade in 2010. Though most piers are best suited for casting a line, Pier 14 supporters argue that its more traditional uses are of the more social, such as sightseeing, dining, dancing. Pier 14 reinforces tourist culture, taking its place alongside the dozens of other east coast piers that thrive on vacation communities and withstand tropical storms and hurricanes alike.
