= Barefoot Landing =

- Location: North Myrtle Beach, South Carolina, United States
- Coordinates: 33°48′3″N 78°44′32″W
- Address: 4898 U.S. 17
- Opened: 1988
- Manager: Burroughs & Chapin Commercial Leasing
- Owner: Barefoot Landing, Inc. / Barefoot Properties Limited Partnership (lLast trademark owners) Burroughs & Chapin Company, Inc through its newly formed holding company Barefoot Landing Commercial LLC
- Num. of stores: 100 shops, 15 restaurants plus several entertainment venues
- Website: bflanding.com

Barefoot Landing is a large shopping complex located in North Myrtle Beach, South Carolina. It consists of several divided sections of stores and attractions located on filled land over top of Louis Lake, next to the Intracoastal Waterway. Barefoot Landing was previously known as the Village of the Barefoot Traders which was a collection of 15 unusual gift shops that was located on 3½ acres along a natural marsh and in 1988 was rebuilt and opened as Barefoot Landing. The complex, a popular tourist attraction, has over 100 stores and restaurants, on all sides of a small lake, plus it has adjoining areas with Alabama Theatre, House of Blues and Alligator Adventure.

== History ==
Barefoot Landing was originally a residential area that had its own private marina, that was developed in the 1970s into a quaint "village" of shops. The Village of Barefoot Traders opened in March 1972 on 3-1/2 acres containing 15 shops surrounded by Louis Lake. In 1988, the entire area was redeveloped and expanded into a much larger complex, consolidated under a single owner, and was rebranded from The Village of Barefoot Traders to Barefoot Landing. Several unexploded bombs were unearthed during the construction of the resort. The bombs were left over from when the property was used as part of a bombing/gunnery range for the military.

=== Purchase by Burroughs and Chapin ===
On December 12, 2012, Burroughs & Chapin along with an investment firm, put in a bid to purchase Barefoot Landing and a memo was sent out to the merchants of Barefoot Landing, notifying them of the potential sale. On April 2, 2013, it was reported that B&C would take control of Barefoot Landing that month and a holding company called "Barefoot Landing Commercial, LLC" filed for incorporation in late January. The purchase was finalized on March 31. Current tenants would not notice any notable changes to the property or its administrative staff. On April 15, 2013, it was also reported that Burroughs & Chapin paid $43 million for Barefoot Landing and the sale closed on March 1, with Barefoot Landing Commercial, LLC paying $43 million for the 64-acre complex which is according to the Register of Deeds office of Horry County. According to tenants, small improvements are set to be made at Barefoot Landing in the next month including installed fountains, playing music throughout the center, and replacing some of the aging boards in the wooden walkways.

On April 14, 2014, The Sun News reported that Barefoot Landing would be undergoing a renovation, along with the addition of 10 new stores. Work included replacing the pedestrian bridges, renovating and expanding the restrooms, freshening up landscaping and resurfacing the parking lots. In Spring 2018, LuLu's by Lucy Buffett opened with 400 seats, live music performances, rope climbing and its own beach, as the anchor to a restaurant district called Dockside Village.

== Resort ==
On December 15, 1998, Silver Carolina Development and Barefoot Landing Inc. presented plans to the North Myrtle Beach city council for the $812 million 2345-acre Barefoot Landing Resort, which would be built over 12 to 15 years. The resort would have four golf courses, two hotels, a marina, and 5000 housing units, along with commercial, office and retail space. Late in 1999, the city annexed the area, a move expected to double the population in the city limits. In March 2000, a renovated swing bridge built in 1934 was moved from Edenton, North Carolina to cross the Intracoastal Waterway, connecting the resort to the shopping center. The golf courses opened in April, though the bridge was not ready, after a delay caused by damage from Hurricane Floyd.

The Resort's section of greenway is a part of the East Coast Greenway, a 3,000-mile long system of trails connecting Maine to Florida. The International Association of Golf Tour Operators named Barefoot Resort 2016 North American Golf Resort of the Year.
