= Ocean Forest Country Club =

- U.S. National Register of Historic Places
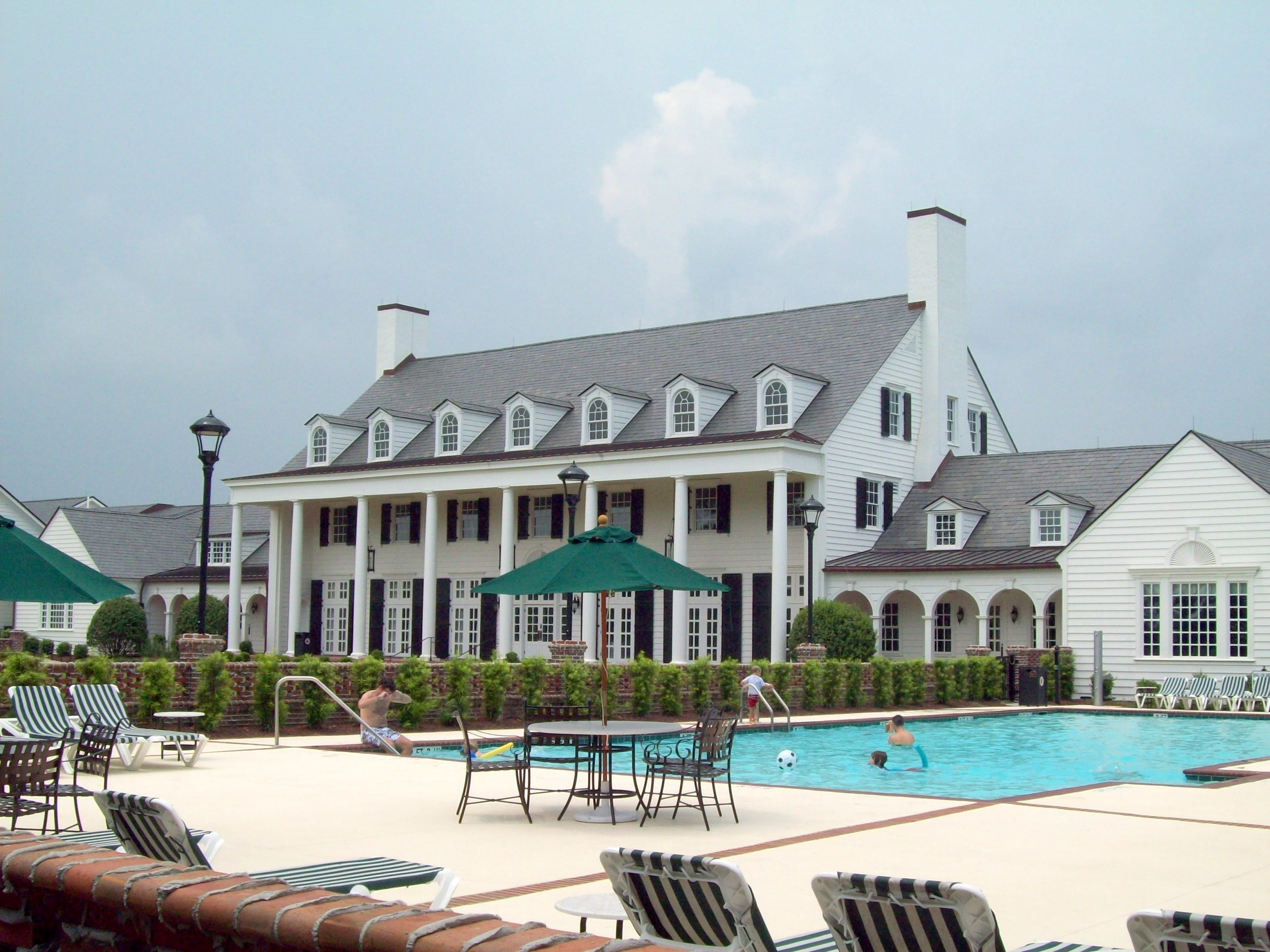
- Ocean Forest Country Club, June 2010

- Location within South Carolina Location within the United States
- Location: 5609 Woodside Dr., Myrtle Beach, South Carolina
- Coordinates: 33°43′47″N 78°50′36″W
- Area: 164.8 acres (66.7 ha)
- Built: 1926
- Architect: Hood, Raymond; White, Robert
- Architectural style: Classical Revival
- MPS: Myrtle Beach MPS
- NRHP reference No.: 96001219
- Added to NRHP: November 7, 1996

Ocean Forest Country Club, previously known as Ocean Forest Hotel and Country Club, and called Pine Lakes Country Club since 1946, is a historic country club and hotel located at Myrtle Beach in Horry County, South Carolina. The club and hotel were designed by an influential New York architect, Raymond Hood (1881-1934) and is an unusual example of Classical Revival architecture. Construction of the club began in 1926 and was completed in 1927. In addition to the hotel / club building, a 27-hole golf course was built in association with the club. It was designed by Robert White, a golf course designer and future president of the Professional Golfers' Association of America. The present 18-hole course dates to 1946.

It was listed on the National Register of Historic Places in 1996.
