= Alabama Theatre (North Myrtle Beach) =

American public theater

Coordinates: 33°48′6″N 78°44′31″W

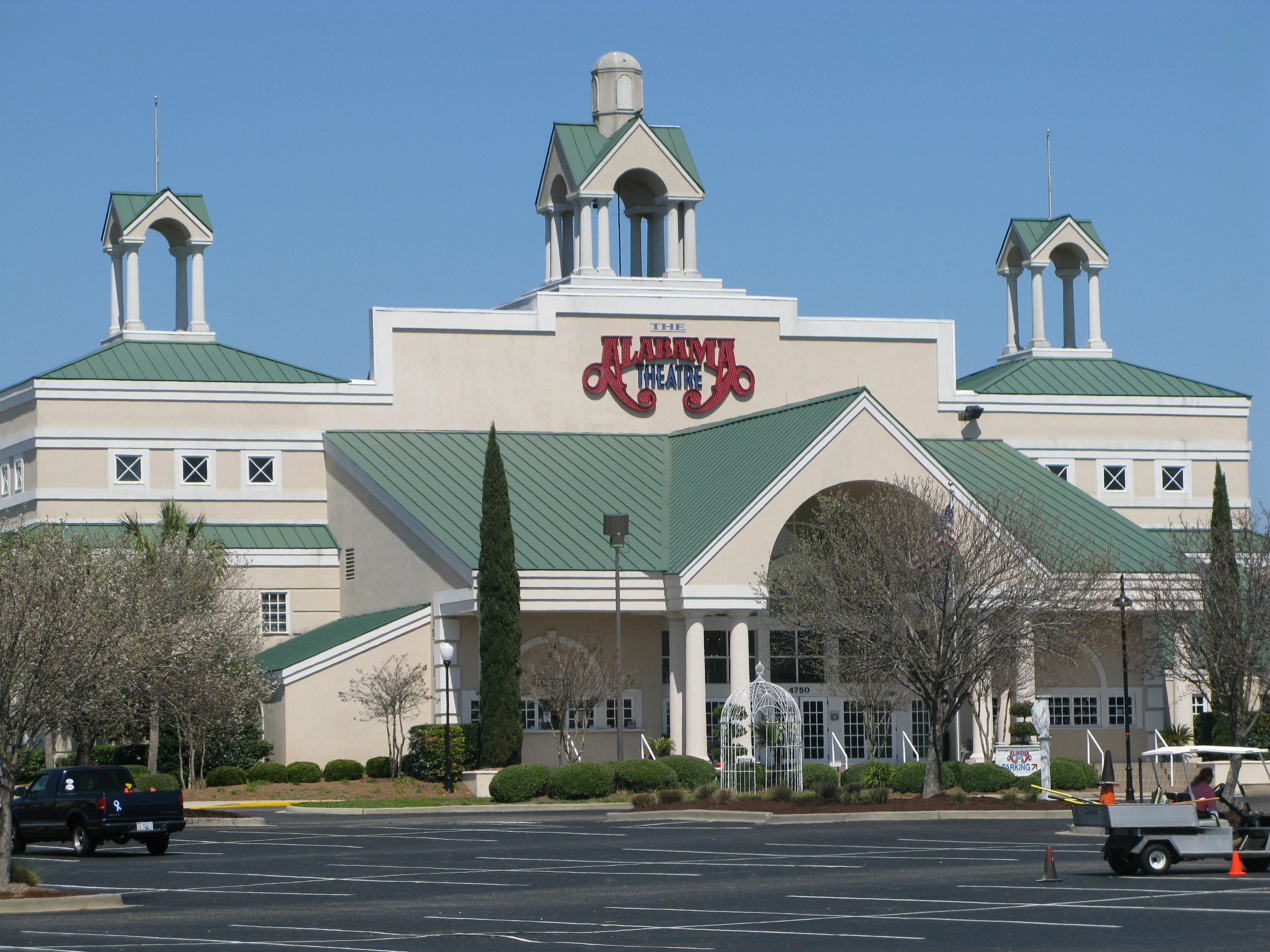
The Alabama Theatre in 2009

The Alabama Theatre is a public theatre located in the Barefoot Landing shopping complex in North Myrtle Beach, South Carolina, United States. Opened in 1993, the theatre hosts shows geared towards families vacationing in the Myrtle Beach area. The theatre hosts traditional country music singers. The theatre has gained media attention from the CBS Morning Show, CMT, TNN and many national/regional publications.

The theatre is named after the country music band Alabama.
