= Myrtle Beach metropolitan area =

Coordinates: 33.589°N 79.055°W

- Metropolitan statistical area
- Myrtle Beach–Conway–North Myrtle Beach, SC Metropolitan Statistical Area
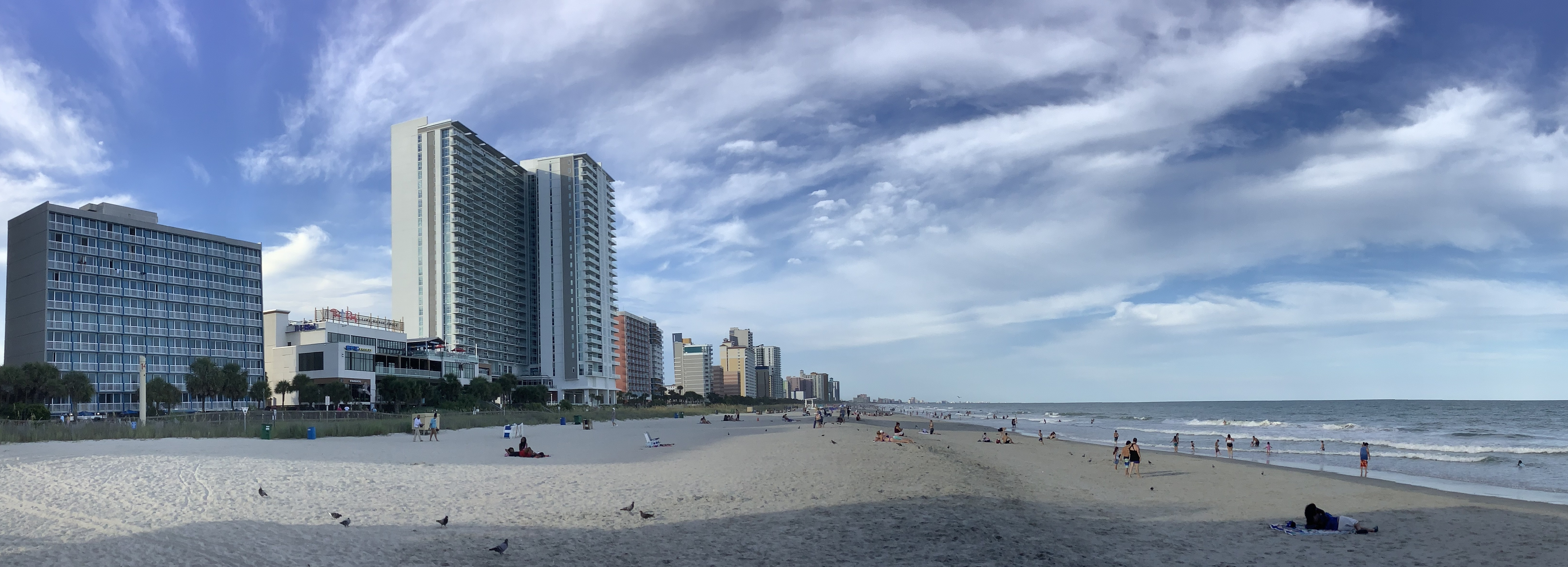
- Myrtle Beach shoreline
Interactive Map of Myrtle Beach–Conway, SC CSA
City of Myrtle Beach
Myrtle Beach–Conway–N. Myrtle Beach MSA
Georgetown µSA
- Country: United States
- State: South Carolina
- Largest city: Myrtle Beach
- Other cities: – Conway – North Myrtle Beach – Loris – Georgetown

Area
  - Total: 2,935 sq mi (7,600 km^{2})

Population (2020)
  - Total: 351,029 (Metro); 414,433 (Combined)
  - Estimate (2025): 427,551 (Metro); 493,463 (Combined)
  - Rank: Metro: 131st in the U.S. Combined: 90th in the U.S.
  - Density: 377/sq mi (145.7/km^{2})
- Time zone: UTC–5 (Eastern (EST))
  - Summer (DST): UTC–4 (EDT)
- Area codes: 843 and 854

The Myrtle Beach metropolitan area (officially the Myrtle Beach–Conway–North Myrtle Beach, SC Metropolitan Statistical Area) is a census-designated metropolitan statistical area (MSA) consisting of Horry County in South Carolina. As of 2025, the population of the MSA was estimated at 427,551. The broader Myrtle Beach–Conway, SC Combined Statistical Area (CSA) includes the adjacent Murrells Inlet micropolitan area (Georgetown County, South Carolina), with an estimated population of 493,463 in 2025.

From 2013 to 2023, Brunswick County, North Carolina was also a component of the Myrtle Beach MSA. In 2023, however, the Office of Management and Budget redefined the statistical area and moved Brunswick County to the Wilmington, NC Metropolitan Statistical Area. The Myrtle Beach MSA's principal cities, ordered by population, are Myrtle Beach, Conway, and North Myrtle Beach in South Carolina. The Myrtle Beach–Conway CSA includes the city of Georgetown, South Carolina.

== Counties ==
- Horry County (427,551)
- Georgetown County (65,912)

== Communities ==
=== Incorporated places ===
- Myrtle Beach (40,937)
- Conway (30,627)
- North Myrtle Beach (21,346)
- Georgetown (8,869)
- Surfside Beach (4,392)
- Loris (2,935)
- Andrews (2,522)
- Aynor (1,068)
- Briarcliffe Acres (585)
- Atlantic Beach (472)
- Pawleys Island (133)

=== Census-designated place ===
- Carolina Forest (30,430)
- Socastee (25,349)
- Red Hill (16,981)
- Garden City (11,068)
- Litchfield Beach (11,012)
- Little River (10,687)
- Murrells Inlet (10,478)
- Forestbrook (7,887)
- Homewood (1,604)
- Dunbar (865)
- DeBordieu Colony (863)
- Bucksport (538)
- Finklea (466)
- Green Sea (67)
- Ketchuptown (48)
- Live Oak (24)

=== Unincorporated communities ===
- Allsbrook
- Bucksville
- Burgess
- Cherry Grove Beach
- Choppee
- Cool Spring
- Crescent Beach
- Galivants Ferry
- Goretown
- Hand
- Hickory Grove
- Hopewell
- Konig
- Longs
- North Santee
- Pine Island
- Plantersville
- Sandy Island
- Spring Gully
- Springmaid Beach
- Toddville
- Wampee

== Demographics ==
Historical population
Census	Pop.	Note	%±
1790	22,122		—
1800	22,938		3.7%
1810	20,028		−12.7%
1820	22,628		13.0%
1830	25,188		11.3%
1840	24,029		−4.6%
1850	28,293		17.7%
1860	29,267		3.4%
1870	26,882		−8.1%
1880	35,187		30.9%
1890	40,113		14.0%
1900	46,210		15.2%
1910	49,265		6.6%
1920	53,793		9.2%
1930	61,114		13.6%
1940	78,303		28.1%
1950	91,582		17.0%
1960	103,045		12.5%
1970	103,492		0.4%
1980	143,880		39.0%
1990	190,355		32.3%
2000	252,426		32.6%
2010	329,449		30.5%
2020	414,433		25.8%
2025 (est.)	493,463		19.1%
U.S. Decennial Census; 1790–1960 1900–1990; 1990–2000 2010–2020

=== 2020 census ===
As of the 2020 census, there were 414,433 people, 177,452 households, and 116,370 families residing in the metro area. There were 239,618 housing units.

== See also ==
- South Carolina statistical areas
