= Coast RTA =

Public bus service in South Carolina, US

Waccamaw Regional Transportation Authority dba The Coast RTA
- Founded: July 4, 1980
- Headquarters: Conway, SC
- Service area: Horry County and Georgetown County, South Carolina
- Service type: bus service, paratransit
- Routes: 14 (7 new routes on planned)
- Stations: Conway South Carolina, 1418 3rd Avenue, Conway
- Fuel type: Diesel, Gas
- Chief executive: Brian Piascik
- Website: https://coastrta.com

Waccamaw Regional Transportation Authority (or Coast RTA, formerly both Waccamaw RTA and Lymo) is a public bus service along the Grand Strand in Horry County, South Carolina. It is based out of Conway, South Carolina, and services an area from North Myrtle Beach to Georgetown.

== Fixed Routes ==
As of 2027:

Route	Terminals			Primary streets traveled	Service notes
1	Conway Terminal	↔	Conway Industrial Park	US 701, SC Route 548	Conway Local Route
2	Conway Terminal	↔	Loris	US 701	Morning and evening service weekdays only
3	Conway Terminal	↔	Bucksport	US 701	Morning and evening service weekdays only
4	Conway Terminal	↔	Georgetown Transfer Center	US 701	Morning and evening service weekdays only Separate route includes Choppee.
5	Conway Terminal	↔	Wal-Mart Mullins	US 501	Via Aynor, Weekdays only 5 AM to 7 PM
6	Conway Terminal	↔	Johnsonville	US 378	Morning and evening service weekdays only
7	Conway Terminal	↔	Ivory Wilson Transfer Center	US 501	Via Coastal Centre, Coastal Carolina University, Tanger Outlets US 501, George Bishop Pkwy, Coastal Grand Mall, & Myrtle Beach Airport Runs from 5:40 AM to 10:05 PM
7X	Conway Terminal	↔	Ivory Wilson Transfer Center	US 501	Along US 501 corrdior only, Morning and evening service daily
8	Conway Terminal	↔	Barefoot Landing	SC 90, International Drive, US 17	Via Cox Ferry Rd, , International Drive, McLeod Health Carolina Forest & Grand Strand Medical Center
9	Coastal North Town Center	↔	Loris	SC Route 9	Morning and evening service weekdays only
10	Ivory Wilson Transfer Center	↔	Coastal Grand Mall		Via Broadway at the Beach, Myrtle Waves & Coastal Grand Mall Runs from 6 AM to 9:56 PM
11	Ivory Wilson Transfer Center	↔	Carolina Forest	US 17	Via Broadway at the Beach
14	Georgetown Transfer Center	↔	Andrews	US 521	Via Georgetown Walmart & HGTC Georgetown Weekdays service only
15N	Ivory Wilson Transfer Center	↔	Grand Strand Medical Center	Kings Highway	
15S	Ivory Wilson Transfer Center	↔	Tidelands Medical	Kings Highway, Farrow Pkwy, Socastee Blvd	Via The Market Commons, VA Medical Center & South Strand Medical Center
16	Ivory Wilson Transfer Center	↔	Georgetown Transfer Center	US 17	Morning and evening rush hour every 30 Minutes weekdays only makes local stop, Not serving 79th Ave N. Via Sandy Island Landing, Tidelands Medical Center, Inlet Square Mall & Springmaid Beach
16X	Grand Strand Medical Center	↔	Georgetown Transfer Center	US 17	Morning and evening service daily
17	Ivory Wilson Transfer Center	↔	Coastal Town Center North	US 17	Via Broadway at the Beach, Grand Stand Medical Center, Tanger Outlets Hwy 17, Myrtle Beach Mall, & Barefoot Landing
18X	Coastal Town Center North	↔	Shallotte Crossing	US 17	Morning and evening service weekdays only
19X	Georgetown Transfer Center	↔	McClellanville	US 17	Departs from Georgetown at 4:40 AM, 9 AM, 12 PM, 3 PM & 6:45 PM Weekdays only
20	Conway Terminal	↔	Coastal Town Center North	SC 90	Via SC-90 corrdior & McLeod Health Seacoast
21	Conway Terminal	↔	Food Lion Longs	SC 905	Morning and evening service weekdays only

== Roster ==
Active

Photo	Year	Make	Model	Numbers	Total	Engine	Transmission	Seats	Notes
	2012	ElDorado National	E-Z Rider II BRT 35'	901–902		Cummins ISL9			Single-door suburban buses
	2002	Gillig	Trolley Replica 29'	1404-1406		Cummins ISL			Ex-County Connection 315-317, acquired in 2022. Used on the two Entertainment Express shuttles
	2007	Gillig	Trolley Replica 29'	1407-1408		Cummins ISL			Ex-Tri-State Transit Authority 1229-1230, acquired in 2022. Used on the two Entertainment Express shuttles
	2017	New Flyer	XD40	1501-1504		Cummins L9		40 (1 crew)	
	2019	New Flyer	XD40	1505-1506		Cummins L9		40 (1 crew)	
	2020	New Flyer	XD40	1507-1510		Cummins L9		40 (1 crew)	2021 models
	2021	New Flyer	XD40	1511-1512		Cummins L9		40 (1 crew)	
	2026	New Flyer	XD40	1513-1516		Cummins L9		40 (1 crew)	
	2020	Ford Starcraft	F-550 ?	3401-3403					

== On Order ==
Photo	Year	Make	Model	Numbers	Total	Engine	Transmission	Seats	Notes
	2027	New Flyer	XD35	1601-1610		Cummins X10		32 (1 crew)	
	2028	Gillig	LowFloor 29'	1701-1710		Cummins X10		26 (1 crew)	Uses for limited services only

== Paratransit ==
Coast RTA Paratransit service is a fully coordinated human service system, including demand response and subscription services. Paratransit service is for seniors (over 60) and individuals with disabilities or conditions that prevent them from using the Coast RTA fixed route system.
