= Waccamaw National Wildlife Refuge =

United States National Wildlife Refuge in South Carolina

- IUCN category IV (habitat/species management area)
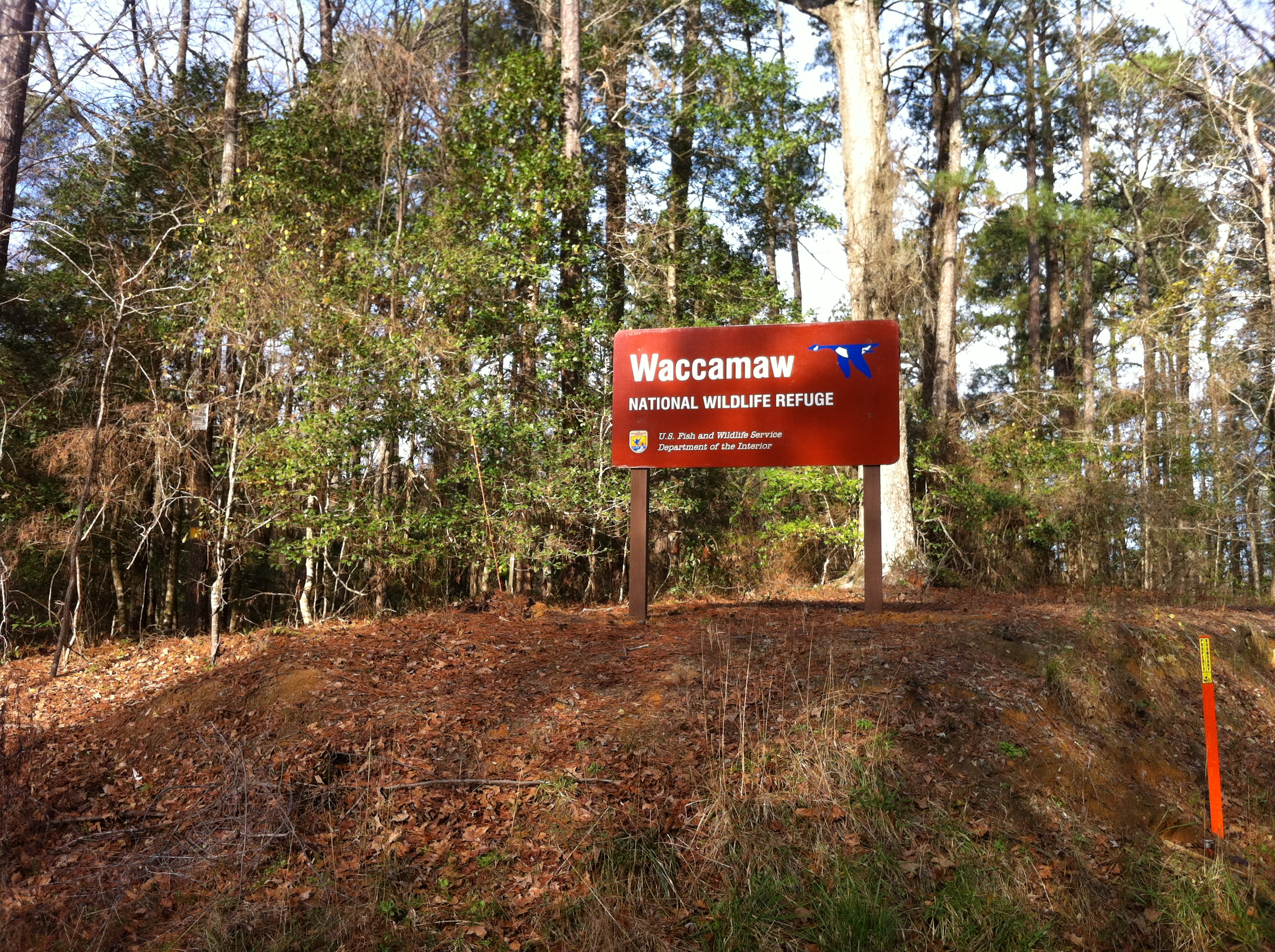
- Waccamaw National Wildlife Refuge

- Location within the United States
- Location: Georgetown, Horry, Marion counties, South Carolina, United States
- Nearest city: Garden City, South Carolina
- Coordinates: 33°38′00″N 79°05′30″W
- Area: 22,931 acres (92.80 km^{2})
- Established: 1997
- Governing body: U.S. Fish and Wildlife Service
- Website: Waccamaw National Wildlife Refuge

Waccamaw National Wildlife Refuge, established in 1997, is a recent addition to the United States National Wildlife Refuge system. It is located in parts of northeastern Georgetown County, South Carolina, southern Horry, and southeastern Marion counties, and contains lands adjacent to the Pee Dee River, the Little Pee Dee River, and the Waccamaw River near their confluence. Currently the size of the refuge is 22,931 acres (92.80 km^{2}) but plans call for the total refuge to be over 50,000 acres (200 km^{2}).

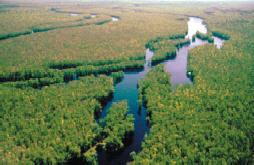
Waccamaw National Wildlife Refuge

It was founded to preserve valuable undeveloped coastal wetland and adjacent uplands that provide habitats for many species of wildlife. Among the endangered species protected there is the red-cockaded woodpecker, whose habitat is primarily the longleaf pine forest on Sandy Island. This is also a nesting area for swallow-tailed kites and bald eagles.

The stated objectives of this refuge are:

- Provide habitat for waterfowl, shorebirds, wading birds, raptors, neo-tropical migratory birds, and resident species.
- Environmental education and interpretation.
- Provide opportunities for hunting, fishing, and outdoor recreation.

The refuge visitor center is located just north of Georgetown on U.S. Route 701. It overlooks the Great Pee Dee River in the small community of Yauhannah.

== See also ==
- Waccamaw River Heritage Preserve, a nature preserve further north along the same river
