= South Carolina Highway 319 =

State highway in South Carolina, United States

South Carolina Highway 319

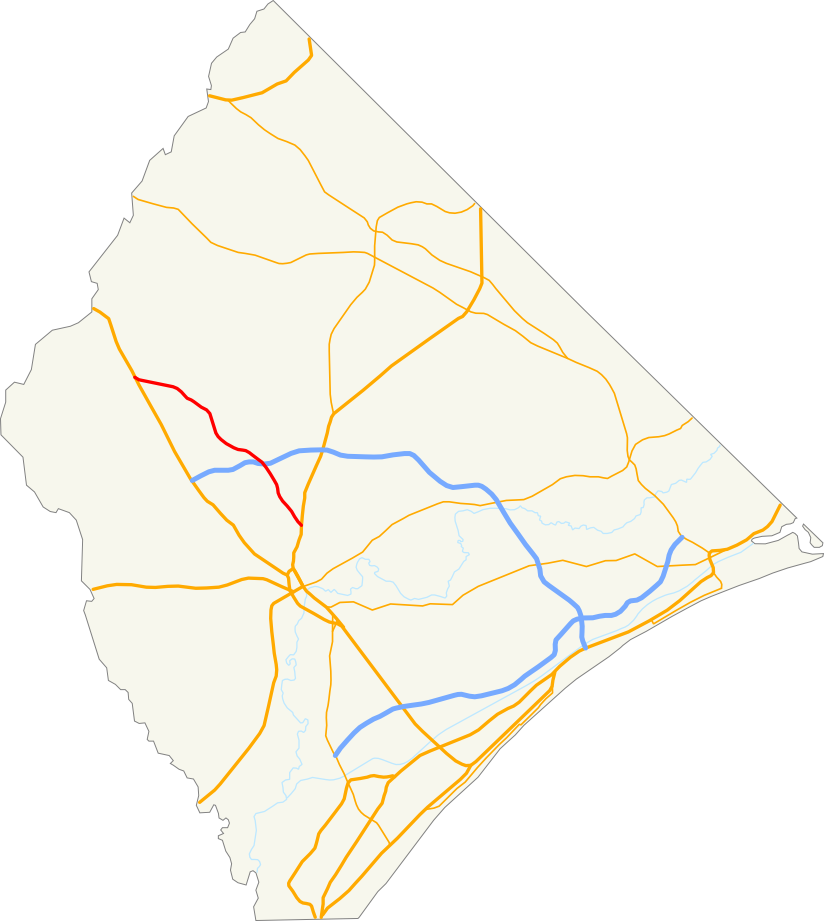

Route information
- Maintained by SCDOT
- Length: 13.210 mi (21.259 km)
- Existed: 1980s–present

Major junctions
- South end: US 701 in Homewood
- SC 22 near Cool Spring
- North end: US 501 in Aynor

Location
- Country: United States
- State: South Carolina
- Counties: Horry

Highway system
- South Carolina State Highway System; Interstate; US; State; Scenic
← SC 315	→ US 321

South Carolina Highway 319 (SC 319) is a 13.210-mile (21.259 km) state highway in Horry County, within the northeastern part of the U.S. state of South Carolina. It travels from U.S. Route 701 in Homewood to US 501 in Aynor.

== History ==
This road was formerly known as the Galivants Ferry Road.

== Major intersections ==
The entire route is in Horry County.

Location	mi	km	Destinations	Notes
Homewood	0.000	0.000	US 701 – Conway, Loris	Southern terminus
Cool Spring	4.040– 4.041	6.502– 6.503	SC 22 – Marion, Myrtle Beach, North Myrtle Beach	Interchange
Aynor	13.210	21.259	US 501 – Conway, Marion	Northern terminus
1.000 mi = 1.609 km; 1.000 km = 0.621 mi
