= Hand, South Carolina =

Coordinates: 33°51′22″N 78°48′26″W

- Unincorporated Community
- Interactive map of Hand, South Carolina
- Country: United States
- State: South Carolina
- County: Horry
- Time zone: Eastern
- ZIP Code: 29526, 29568
- Area code: 843

Hand is an unincorporated community in Horry County, South Carolina, United States. Hand is located along SC 90 between Conway and Wampee.

== History ==
A post office called Hand was established in 1888, and remained in operation until 1942. The origin of the name "Hand" is obscure.
