= South Carolina statistical areas =

Coordinates: 33.9169°N 80.8964°W

The U.S. State of South Carolina currently has 20 statistical areas that have been delineated by the Office of Management and Budget (OMB). On July 21, 2023, the OMB delineated four combined statistical areas, ten metropolitan statistical areas, and six micropolitan statistical areas in South Carolina. As of 2023, the largest of these is the Greenville-Spartanburg-Anderson, SC CSA, comprising the area around Greenville in the state's Upcountry.

== Statistical areas ==
The Office of Management and Budget (OMB) has designated more than 1,000 statistical areas for the United States and Puerto Rico. These statistical areas are important geographic delineations of population clusters used by the OMB, the United States Census Bureau, planning organizations, and federal, state, and local government entities.

The OMB defines a core-based statistical area (commonly referred to as a CBSA) as the county or counties (or county-equivalents) surrounding at least one densely-settled core of at least 10,000 population, "plus adjacent counties having a high degree of social and economic integration with the core as measured through commuting ties with the counties containing the core". The OMB further divides core-based statistical areas based on population into metropolitan statistical areas (MSAs) for those with at least 50,000 and micropolitan statistical areas (μSAs) for those with 10,000 to 49,999 people.

The OMB defines a combined statistical area (CSA) as two or more adjacent core-based statistical areas where the employment interchange rate (% commuting from A to B plus % commuting from B to A) is at least 15%. The primary statistical areas (PSAs) include all combined statistical areas and any core-based statistical area that is not a constituent of a combined statistical area.

The 20 United States statistical areas and 46 counties of the State of South Carolina (Note: An out-of-state area and its population are displayed in green. An area that extends into more than one state is displayed in purple. A purple population number over a black population number show the total population versus the in-state population. The state's abbreviation is also shown next to the in-state total.)
Combined statistical area	2025 population (est.)	Core-based statistical area	2025 population (est.)	County	2025 population (est.)
Greenville-Spartanburg-Anderson, SC CSA	1,658,656	Greenville-Anderson-Greer, SC MSA	1,014,101	Greenville County, South Carolina	583,125
Greenville-Spartanburg-Anderson, SC CSA	1,658,656	Greenville-Anderson-Greer, SC MSA	1,014,101	Anderson County, South Carolina	219,930
Greenville-Spartanburg-Anderson, SC CSA	1,658,656	Greenville-Anderson-Greer, SC MSA	1,014,101	Pickens County, South Carolina	139,198
Greenville-Spartanburg-Anderson, SC CSA	1,658,656	Greenville-Anderson-Greer, SC MSA	1,014,101	Laurens County, South Carolina	71,848
Greenville-Spartanburg-Anderson, SC CSA	1,658,656	Spartanburg, SC MSA	407,656	Spartanburg County, South Carolina	380,857
Greenville-Spartanburg-Anderson, SC CSA	1,658,656	Spartanburg, SC MSA	407,656	Union County, South Carolina	26,799
Greenville-Spartanburg-Anderson, SC CSA	1,658,656	Greenwood, SC μSA	95,215	Greenwood County, South Carolina	70,379
Greenville-Spartanburg-Anderson, SC CSA	1,658,656	Greenwood, SC μSA	95,215	Abbeville County, South Carolina	24,836
Greenville-Spartanburg-Anderson, SC CSA	1,658,656	Seneca, SC μSA	83,409	Oconee County, South Carolina	83,409
Greenville-Spartanburg-Anderson, SC CSA	1,658,656	Gaffney, SC μSA	58,275	Cherokee County, South Carolina	58,275
Columbia-Sumter-Orangeburg, SC CSA	1,107,723	Columbia, SC MSA	879,918	Richland County, South Carolina	434,956
Columbia-Sumter-Orangeburg, SC CSA	1,107,723	Columbia, SC MSA	879,918	Lexington County, South Carolina	317,588
Columbia-Sumter-Orangeburg, SC CSA	1,107,723	Columbia, SC MSA	879,918	Kershaw County, South Carolina	73,166
Columbia-Sumter-Orangeburg, SC CSA	1,107,723	Columbia, SC MSA	879,918	Fairfield County, South Carolina	20,340
Columbia-Sumter-Orangeburg, SC CSA	1,107,723	Columbia, SC MSA	879,918	Saluda County, South Carolina	19,680
Columbia-Sumter-Orangeburg, SC CSA	1,107,723	Columbia, SC MSA	879,918	Calhoun County, South Carolina	14,188
Columbia-Sumter-Orangeburg, SC CSA	1,107,723	Sumter, SC MSA	105,067	Sumter County, South Carolina	105,067
Columbia-Sumter-Orangeburg, SC CSA	1,107,723	Orangeburg, SC μSA	83,177	Orangeburg County, South Carolina	83,177
Columbia-Sumter-Orangeburg, SC CSA	1,107,723	Newberry, SC μSA	39,561	Newberry County, South Carolina	39,561
none		Charleston-North Charleston, SC MSA	889,263	Charleston County, South Carolina	436,200
none		Charleston-North Charleston, SC MSA	889,263	Berkeley County, South Carolina	274,666
none		Charleston-North Charleston, SC MSA	889,263	Dorchester County, South Carolina	178,397
Myrtle Beach-Conway, SC CSA	493,463	Myrtle Beach-Conway-North Myrtle Beach, SC MSA	427,551	Horry County, South Carolina	427,551
Myrtle Beach-Conway, SC CSA	493,463	Murrells Inlet, SC μSA	65,912	Georgetown County, South Carolina	65,912
Charlotte-Concord, NC-SC CSA	3,533,073; 454,184(SC)	Charlotte-Concord-Gastonia, NC-SC MSA	2,938,830; 454,184 (SC)	Mecklenburg County, North Carolina	1,233,383
Charlotte-Concord, NC-SC CSA	3,533,073; 454,184(SC)	Charlotte-Concord-Gastonia, NC-SC MSA	2,938,830; 454,184 (SC)	York County, South Carolina	306,887
Charlotte-Concord, NC-SC CSA	3,533,073; 454,184(SC)	Charlotte-Concord-Gastonia, NC-SC MSA	2,938,830; 454,184 (SC)	Union County, North Carolina	267,674
Charlotte-Concord, NC-SC CSA	3,533,073; 454,184(SC)	Charlotte-Concord-Gastonia, NC-SC MSA	2,938,830; 454,184 (SC)	Cabarrus County, North Carolina	249,725
Charlotte-Concord, NC-SC CSA	3,533,073; 454,184(SC)	Charlotte-Concord-Gastonia, NC-SC MSA	2,938,830; 454,184 (SC)	Gaston County, North Carolina	246,558
Charlotte-Concord, NC-SC CSA	3,533,073; 454,184(SC)	Charlotte-Concord-Gastonia, NC-SC MSA	2,938,830; 454,184 (SC)	Iredell County, North Carolina	211,798
Charlotte-Concord, NC-SC CSA	3,533,073; 454,184(SC)	Charlotte-Concord-Gastonia, NC-SC MSA	2,938,830; 454,184 (SC)	Rowan County, North Carolina	155,096
Charlotte-Concord, NC-SC CSA	3,533,073; 454,184(SC)	Charlotte-Concord-Gastonia, NC-SC MSA	2,938,830; 454,184 (SC)	Lancaster County, South Carolina	114,296
Charlotte-Concord, NC-SC CSA	3,533,073; 454,184(SC)	Charlotte-Concord-Gastonia, NC-SC MSA	2,938,830; 454,184 (SC)	Lincoln County, North Carolina	98,654
Charlotte-Concord, NC-SC CSA	3,533,073; 454,184(SC)	Charlotte-Concord-Gastonia, NC-SC MSA	2,938,830; 454,184 (SC)	Chester County, South Carolina	33,001
Charlotte-Concord, NC-SC CSA	3,533,073; 454,184(SC)	Charlotte-Concord-Gastonia, NC-SC MSA	2,938,830; 454,184 (SC)	Anson County, North Carolina	21,758
Charlotte-Concord, NC-SC CSA	3,533,073; 454,184(SC)	Hickory-Lenoir-Morganton, NC MSA	376,890	Catawba County, North Carolina	170,172
Charlotte-Concord, NC-SC CSA	3,533,073; 454,184(SC)	Hickory-Lenoir-Morganton, NC MSA	376,890	Burke County, North Carolina	88,655
Charlotte-Concord, NC-SC CSA	3,533,073; 454,184(SC)	Hickory-Lenoir-Morganton, NC MSA	376,890	Caldwell County, North Carolina	81,105
Charlotte-Concord, NC-SC CSA	3,533,073; 454,184(SC)	Hickory-Lenoir-Morganton, NC MSA	376,890	Alexander County, North Carolina	36,958
Charlotte-Concord, NC-SC CSA	3,533,073; 454,184(SC)	Shelby-Kings Mountain, NC μSA	103,325	Cleveland County, North Carolina	103,325
Charlotte-Concord, NC-SC CSA	3,533,073; 454,184(SC)	Albemarle, NC μSA	68,830	Stanly County, North Carolina	68,830
Charlotte-Concord, NC-SC CSA	3,533,073; 454,184(SC)	Marion, NC μSA	45,198	McDowell County, North Carolina	45,198
none		Hilton Head Island-Bluffton-Port Royal, SC MSA	242,966	Beaufort County, South Carolina	204,433
none		Hilton Head Island-Bluffton-Port Royal, SC MSA	242,966	Jasper County, South Carolina	38,533
none		Augusta-Richmond County, GA-SC MSA	641,231; 211,323 (SC)	Richmond County, Georgia	206,559
none		Augusta-Richmond County, GA-SC MSA	641,231; 211,323 (SC)	Aiken County, South Carolina	181,515
none		Augusta-Richmond County, GA-SC MSA	641,231; 211,323 (SC)	Columbia County, Georgia	169,189
none		Augusta-Richmond County, GA-SC MSA	641,231; 211,323 (SC)	Edgefield County, South Carolina	29,808
none		Augusta-Richmond County, GA-SC MSA	641,231; 211,323 (SC)	Burke County, Georgia	24,408
none		Augusta-Richmond County, GA-SC MSA	641,231; 211,323 (SC)	McDuffie County, Georgia	21,640
none		Augusta-Richmond County, GA-SC MSA	641,231; 211,323 (SC)	Lincoln County, Georgia	8,112
none		Florence, SC MSA	201,392	Florence County, South Carolina	138,504
none		Florence, SC MSA	201,392	Darlington County, South Carolina	62,888
none		none		Chesterfield County, South Carolina	44,740
none		none		Colleton County, South Carolina	39,382
none		none		Clarendon County, South Carolina	31,043
none		none		Williamsburg County, South Carolina	29,662
none		none		Marion County, South Carolina	28,242
none		none		Dillon County, South Carolina	27,458
none		none		Marlboro County, South Carolina	25,488
none		none		Barnwell County, South Carolina	20,653
none		none		Hampton County, South Carolina	18,174
none		none		Lee County, South Carolina	15,730
none		none		Bamberg County, South Carolina	12,796
none		none		McCormick County, South Carolina	10,215
none		none		Allendale County, South Carolina	7,355
State of South Carolina					5,569,908

The 16 core-based statistical areas of the State of South Carolina (Note: For CBSAs comprising populations from multiple states, they are listed twice to show both their intrastate population within that CBSA as well as the CBSA's total population. Only the intrastate population is ranked.)
2025 rank	Core-based statistical area	Population				
2025 rank	Core-based statistical area	2025 estimate	Change	2020 Census	Change	2010 Census
1	Greenville-Anderson-Greer, SC MSA	1,014,101	+9.26%	928,195	+12.63%	824,112
2	Charleston-North Charleston, SC MSA	889,263	+11.21%	799,636	+20.32%	664,607
3	Columbia, SC MSA	879,918	+6.08%	829,470	+8.06%	767,598
4	Charlotte-Concord-Gastonia, NC-SC MSA (SC)	454,184	+10.67%	410,400	+22.19%	335,865
5	Myrtle Beach-Conway-North Myrtle Beach, SC MSA	427,551	+21.80%	351,029	+30.35%	269,291
6	Spartanburg, SC MSA	407,656	+14.75%	355,241	+13.40%	313,268
7	Hilton Head Island-Bluffton-Port Royal, SC MSA	242,966	+12.53%	215,908	+15.45%	187,010
8	Augusta-Richmond County, GA-SC MSA (SC)	211,323	+8.67%	194,465	+3.95%	187,084
9	Florence, SC MSA	201,392	+0.71%	199,964	−2.73%	205,566
10	Sumter, SC MSA	105,067	−0.46%	105,556	−1.77%	107,456
11	Greenwood, SC μSA	95,215	+1.68%	93,646	−1.51%	95,078
12	Seneca, SC μSA	83,409	+6.11%	78,607	+5.84%	74,273
13	Orangeburg, SC μSA	83,177	−1.24%	84,223	−8.95%	92,501
14	Murrells Inlet, SC μSA	65,912	+3.96%	63,404	+5.40%	60,158
15	Gaffney, SC μSA	58,275	+3.66%	56,216	+1.58%	55,342
16	Newberry, SC μSA	39,561	+4.88%	37,719	+0.56%	37,508
	Augusta-Richmond County, GA-SC MSA	641,231	+4.95%	611,000	+8.17%	564,873
	Charlotte-Concord-Gastonia, NC-SC MSA	2,938,830	+10.47%	2,660,329	+18.56%	2,243,960

The four combined statistical areas of the State of South Carolina (Note: For CSAs comprising populations from multiple states, they are listed twice to show both their intrastate population within that CSA as well as the CSA's total population. Only the intrastate population is ranked.)
2025 rank	Combined statistical area	Population				
2025 rank	Combined statistical area	2025 estimate	Change	2020 Census	Change	2010 Census
1	Greenville-Spartanburg-Anderson, SC CSA	1,658,656	+9.71%	1,511,905	+11.00%	1,362,073
2	Columbia-Sumter-Orangeburg, SC CSA	1,107,723	+4.80%	1,056,968	+5.16%	1,005,063
3	Myrtle Beach-Conway, SC CSA	493,463	+19.07%	414,433	+25.80%	329,449
4	Charlotte-Concord, NC-SC CSA (SC)	454,184	+10.67%	410,400	+22.19%	335,865
	Charlotte-Concord, NC-SC CSA	3,533,073	+9.31%	3,232,206	+14.90%	2,813,116

== See also ==
- Geography of South Carolina
  - Demographics of South Carolina
