= Golden Frinks =

American civil rights activist (1920–2004)

Golden Asro Frinks
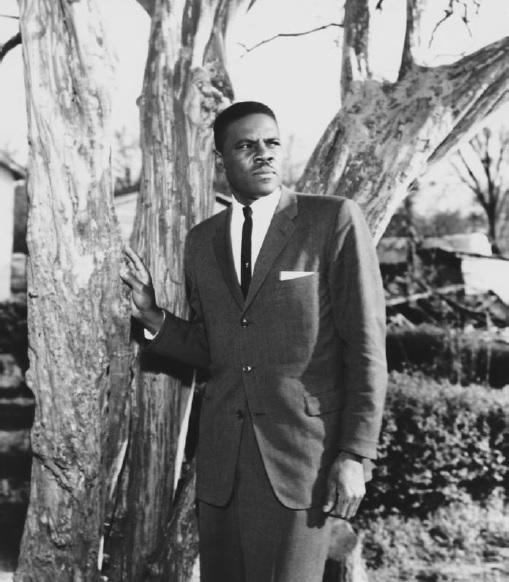
- Golden Frinks as a field secretary of the Southern Christian Leadership Conference, 1964
- Born: August 15, 1920; Wampee, South Carolina, US
- Died: July 19, 2004 (aged 83); Edenton, North Carolina, US
- Organization: Southern Christian Leadership Conference
- Spouse: Mildred Ruth Holley
- Children: Goldie Frinks Wells
- Parents: Mark Frinks; Kizzie Frinks

Golden Asro Frinks (August 15, 1920 – July 19, 2004) was an American civil rights activist and a Southern Christian Leadership Conference (SCLC) field secretary who represented the New Bern, North Carolina SCLC chapter. He is best known as a principal civil rights organizer in North Carolina during the 1960s.

Frinks was also a United States Army veteran who fought in World War II and worked at the U.S. naval base in Norfolk, Virginia. After his military career, he began promoting equality for African Americans through organized demonstrations. Frinks' involvement in the Civil Rights Movement brought early civil rights victories to North Carolina, and his willingness to engage in nonviolent, direct action served as a catalyst for civil rights movements in Edenton and nearby towns.

After becoming a field secretary of the SCLC, Frinks built a close relationship with Martin Luther King Jr. and often worked with the civil rights leader in organizing desegregation movements until King's death in 1968. Frinks' work as a field secretary and his direct actions against the Jim Crow Laws began a new era for the civil rights movement in North Carolina and the de-segregation of the South.

== Early life ==
Golden Asro Frinks was born to Mark and Kizzie Frinks on August 15, 1920, in the small town of Wampee, South Carolina; he was the tenth of eleven children in the Frinks family. His name came from a profound "golden text" that Frinks' mother witnessed at Sunday services just before Frinks was born that afternoon.

At the age of nine, Frinks moved to Tabor City, North Carolina. This small town served as the primary location for Frinks' childhood. Frinks' father, Mark Frinks, worked as a millwright while mother, Kizzie Frinks, worked as a domestic helper for the town's mayor, J. L. Lewis. Not long after moving to Tabor City, Frinks' father died and Frinks' mother was left to take care of the large household. As a single parent, her strong will and determination made a lasting impact on Frinks during his childhood. She taught her children not to conform to society's status quo, but strive for the change they wanted. This influence later set the stage for Frinks' outlook on life and push him to fight for racial equality.

Another key person during Frinks' childhood was Fannie Lewis, the wife of the town mayor who Frinks' mother worked for. Having lost her son at an early age, Lewis took special interest in Frinks and viewed him as a surrogate son. Her relationship with Frinks brought him into the social sphere of the white community in Tabor City, exposing him to ideas and knowledge that black children rarely experience. During that time, the Jim Crow Laws, racial segregation laws that were enacted after the Reconstruction period which segregated public facilities in the former Confederate states, were widely observed in the South and strict racial segregation was enforced below the Mason–Dixon line. Having learned about the South's racial culture, attempts at desegregation, and the rise of prominent black leaders from Lewis, Frinks developed ideas of rebellion against the Jim Crow Laws and discrimination in the South at a young age.

== Early Civil Rights activism and the Edenton Movement ==
At the age of sixteen, Frinks left Tabor City and enlisted in the United States Navy in Norfolk, Virginia. After a brief detour in the city of Edenton, North Carolina, Frinks arrived at Norfolk and secured a job at US naval base. It was at Norfolk where Frinks first learned about the National Association for the Advancement of Colored People (NAACP) through the politically active black community in the city.

Returning to Edenton in 1942, Frinks married Mildred Ruth Holley and they had a daughter, Goldie Frinks. Soon after, Frinks briefly served in the United States Army as a staff sergeant during World War II. After the war, Frinks moved to the District of Columbia in 1948 to seek new job opportunities. In Washington D.C. Frinks had his first encounter with civil rights activity. In January, 1953, while working at Waylie's Drug Store, Frinks saw his employer refuse to serve lunch to a group of black teens and was deeply bothered by the injustice he witnessed. The event prompted him to join a six-month-long picketing campaign on the drug store. For an hour a day, Frinks led the protest in front of the drug store and brought together other blacks to demand the desegregation of the store. Through his persistency, Frinks learned that continuous picketing and organized group protests deteriorated the strength of the Jim Crow Laws, resulting in the Supreme Court to rule on June 8, 1953, that "segregated eating facilities in Washington, D.C. were unconstitutional." While small in magnitude, the drug store sit-in gave Frinks a taste of civil rights victory and cemented his commitment to help fight segregation using the tactics he learned.

Frinks soon left D.C. and returned to Edenton; he became actively involved with his family in the Chowan County Branch of the NAACP and served as secretary of the chapter. It was during his time in the NAACP that Frinks realized a major issue with black activism was the unwillingness of some black leaders to actively engage in civil rights activity. At the annual NAACP town meeting on March 3, 1960, the local chapter president refused to support a petition by black children in the town to desegregate the local theater out of fear of losing his real estate holdings by supporting such a movement. On March 4, 1960, Frinks resigned from his position in the local NAACP and proceeded to organize his own protest with children from the NAACP Youth Council using the experience he learned from his first protest in Washington, D.C. The protest on the theater was a success and its victory helped spread Frinks' name as a North Carolina civil rights activist.

The hesitancy of the local NAACP chapter to challenge segregation motivated Frinks to take his own direct actions. In the months following the first victory, Frinks began what is known as the Edenton Movement. The Edenton Movement was the series of protests and pickets throughout the early 1960s to desegregate public locations in Edenton, North Carolina. Frinks led the town's young activists to participate in his desegregation effort and made them the main participants of the movement. Their efforts helped successfully desegregate several public locations in Edenton including the courthouse, library, and the historically white John A. Holmes High School.

Nationally, the Edenton Movement put the small town on the civil rights radar. This attention brought animosity from the white community towards Frinks and his supporters because many whites viewed the movement as a disturbance to peace in the town. Thus, as the leader of the movement, Frinks constantly faced threats and acts of hatred. In one instance, local whites burnt a cross in Frinks' yard and left a dead rabbit on the porch with an ominous message stating that Frinks will "end up like this rabbit if he does not stop protesting." In an interview with Goldie Wells, Frinks recalled that there were moments when he feared for his life and the safety of his family but "kept praying and kept marching," demonstrating his resilience and commitment to his cause.

== Southern Christian Leadership Conference ==
In 1962, Frinks was first arrested during the Edenton Movement for a demonstration at a theater when Frinks refused to stop what police considered "unlawful picketing". This incident was the first of Frinks' eighty-seven self-reported arrests for civil rights demonstrations throughout his lifetime. While direct, Frinks' methods for picketing often irritated law enforcement, leading to his frequent arrests and earning him the nickname of "The Great Agitator". During one particular protest in 1962, Frinks was arrested along with several teenagers from the community. The NAACP agreed to pay off Frinks' bail but refused to pay for the teens, citing that it was the responsibility of the parents to pay for their children. News quickly spread and got to Martin Luther King Jr. the president of the Southern Christian Leadership Conference (SCLC). The SCLC is a nationally recognized African-American civil rights organization which operated through several regional chapters that promoted activism and desegregation in the south during the civil rights movement. Frinks' relationship with the SCLC began when King sent funds to bail all the protesters out of jail after the NAACP refused to pay for the other demonstrators.

Throughout the Edenton Movement, King and other SCLC leaders such as Fred LaGarde, the SCLC's regional representative for northeastern North Carolina, followed the demonstrations and protests closely and noted Frinks' enthusiasm towards civil rights activity in his town. Thus, in 1963, when the SCLC sought a field organizer in North Carolina, King requested Frinks to meet him face-to-face in Norfolk, Virginia with two character witnesses. Frinks brought his pastor and SCLC representative, LaGarde, and longtime friend, Norman Brinkley, to vouch for his character. When King met Frinks in Norfolk, he hired Frinks as one of the twelve national SCLC Field Secretaries. As a field secretary, Frinks was in charge of overseeing the desegregation efforts in North Carolina. However, in the following months Frinks also traveled to other states including Louisiana, Mississippi, Alabama, and Kentucky to scout out the locations and make sure it was fit for King's arrival.

Through his position as field secretary of the SCLC, Frinks worked closely with King on many occasions and was constantly organizing civil rights activities. Like King, he practiced activism and even began campaigns in his hometown of Edenton and other rural areas of North Carolina.

== Williamston Freedom Movement ==
In the summer of 1963, King received notice of garbage not being collected in black communities in Williamston, a town forty miles south of Edenton. Knowing the capabilities of Frinks and his familiarity with eastern North Carolina, King sent Frinks to lead the black community to take action against this and other injustices in what is known as the Williamston Freedom Movement. On June 30, 1963, Frinks and another local civil rights activist, Sarah Small, led the first march on the Williamston town hall which lasted twenty-nine consecutive days. Before the protest, Frinks had a meeting with other civil rights leaders in the area to discuss their activist plans in Williamston and their assault on the Jim Crow Laws in the area. During the meeting, Frinks sat next to an NAACP representative who spoke about the matter in a "calm and dignified manner" which didn't seem to arouse the attendees. When Frinks got his turn to talk, he fervently displayed his passion for justice by jumping onto the tables and shouting "Do you want your freedom?" Historian David Cecelski commented that it was because of Frinks' "streaks of wildness" that successfully led him to civil rights victories and the support of other civil rights activists who admired his uninhibited display of action.

Throughout the movement, Frinks led several notable protests to desegregate public locations in Williamston. On July 1, 1963, Frinks led a protest to desegregate Watts Theater in the center of town, resulting in the first arrests of the movement. Other events include a sit-in at Shamrock Restaurants, a march to protest the segregation of S&V Food Store, and a campaign to desegregate schools in Martin County and obtain equal resources for black students. Throughout the movement, Frinks assumed a leadership position and brought together the black community. Marie Robertson, a demonstrator, recalled "Our demonstrations and marches were really unnerving to the white community. The togetherness of the black people was something they were not accustomed to." Frinks' position as a civil rights leader helped him consolidate support to overturn the inequality that was oppressing the black people of Williamston.

While Frinks was the main organizer of the Williamston Freedom Movement, information about his protests and plans were constantly leaked to the outside white community and to the local chapter of the Ku Klux Klan. The information that was passed on to the Klan was a great risk that Frinks' constantly faced and could only occur with the assistance of blacks, hinting that Frinks did not have the full support of the entire black community during the Williamston demonstrations. Both the Klan, and blacks who did not support Frinks, carefully watched his actions as he was considered a "troublemaker" of the movement. The primary reason why some blacks did not support Frinks' demonstrations was their economic dependency on the white community and their fear of being cut off financially. In the 1960s, North Carolina farmed tobacco as its main cash crop, producing over two-thirds of the nation's tobacco crop. A large number of blacks worked on tobacco plantations for wealthy white plantation owners. These black tobacco farmers feared that activism would cause the plantation owners to fire black laborers and switch over to using machines instead as the tobacco farming sector was becoming mechanized. Frinks recognized this financial problem early on in his campaign and used it to his advantage by leading boycotts on white businesses in Williamston and directed the black consumers' business elsewhere. In the end, the "power of the purse" was strong enough to weaken the Jim Crow Laws as the boycotts were successful in hindering the local economy and gave the black community an upper hand in negotiations for desegregation.

== Later activism and controversies ==
Beginning in 1968, Frinks and other SCLC officials began a boycott in Hyde County, North Carolina, to desegregate public schools. With King's assassination on April 4, 1968, Ralph Abernathy assumed the role of the national SCLC president and visited Hyde County to lend his support for the school boycott, implying national SCLC support of the movement. In the spring of 1969, Frinks led two nationally covered marches advocating integration in Hyde County; one from Swan Quarter to Raleigh and another from Asheville to Raleigh called the Mountaintop to Valley March. The goal of these marches was to travel through as many towns as possible to inform them of the movement going on in Hyde County and gain support of neighboring towns. Using the same technique of persistent, frequent protests he had been for over a decade, Frinks' efforts paid off. In November 1969, Hyde County citizens voted on a referendum that provided the necessary funding to desegregate the Mattamuskeet School.

Despite the victory, Frinks' image was hurt when the North Carolina governor at the time, Bob Scott, called for a State Bureau of Investigation case claiming that Frinks pocketed money donated to him for the boycott. The accusation brought a considerable amount of negative attention towards Frinks as he had previously been arrested on December 28, 1968, for paying a motel tab with a worthless check during his demonstrations in Swan Quarter.

In April 1973, Frinks lent his help to the Tuscarora Indians of Robeson County, North Carolina by leading a march on the state capitol to demand tribal recognition for the group and obtain federal aid. For over a century, the Tuscarora Indians were not nationally recognized as a tribe and were considered part of the Cherokees. This event demonstrated Frinks' willingness to move away from the civil rights movement to help other groups obtain equality and also highlighted a national concern for minorities that do not receive the proper recognition or federal aid they require.

Frinks was also a supporter of women's rights. In August 1974, when Joanne Little was accused of murdering her white jailer, Frinks jumped to Little's defense and suggested she had been attacked in her cell and acted out of self-defense. When Little's first lawyer withdrew from her case, Frinks publicly guaranteed Little's safety and set up a defense team using his personal civil rights attorneys to ensure Little a speedy trial. He also set up the Joanne Little Legal Defense Fund to raise money for her case. On August 14, 1975, the jury acquitted Little from her murder charges. The Joanne Little case was an example of a women's right to defend herself against possible rape and the rights of a prisoner to protect themselves from being abused. Frinks played an integral part throughout the murder trial, ensuring Little a safe trial and rallying up supporters for her defense.

During the Wilmington Movement of 1978, Frinks again stirred up controversy and accusations of fraud. Kojo Nantambu, a local in the Wilmington black community, reported that "the black community were together until Golden came. Golden came in and he divided the community. He also went around taking donations and they were taking that money and pocketing it." The statements from Nantambu indicates that Frinks did not have the full support of the black community. Some blacks in Wilmington were concerned that Frinks was causing a split in the community between those who supported his wild activism and others who disagreed with his protesting methods. The accusations of Frinks mishandling money added to the controversy since money issues were present several times in Frinks' past which caused some people to doubt his motives.

== Death and legacy ==
While Frinks was not a nationally known figure, he was a crucial participant in the civil rights movement and was partially responsible for King's success. In 1977, Frinks officially ended his employment with the SCLC but continued to support the SCLC's activities. In a 1978 interview, Frinks said that he was satisfied with his position in the struggle for African American equality, and that he intended to continue his lifelong goal even though he was no longer an active protester, commenting, "If my people call, I will be ready to answer." Frinks' commitment and dedication to the civil rights movement landed him numerous awards and recognitions including but not limited to: a resolution from the Georgia General Assembly, recognition from the National SCLC, the Chowan County NAACP Achievement award, the Edenton Movement Service Award, the Rosa Parks Award, and the North Carolina Black Leadership Caucus Award. Golden Asro Frinks died on July 19, 2004, in Edenton, North Carolina, at the age of 84; Frinks' lifelong dedication to civil rights activism and desegregation inspired countless others to stand up in pursuit of social justice and equality.

== See also ==
- List of civil rights leaders

== Bibliography ==
- Cecelski, David S. (1994). Along Freedom Road: Hyde County, North Carolina and the Fate of Black Schools in the South. Univ of North Carolina Press. ISBN 978-0-8078-4437-3.
- Cunningham, David (2012). Klansville, U.S.A.: The Rise and Fall of the Civil Rights-Era Ku Klux Klan. Oxford University Press. ISBN 978-0-19-990813-4.
- Wells, Goldie; Sanders, Crystal (2011). Golden Asro Frinks: Telling the Unsung Song. Aardvark Global Publishing. ISBN 978-1-4276-3717-8.
- Smith, Amanda Hilliard (2014). The Williamston Freedom Movement: A North Carolina Town's Struggle for Civil Rights, 1957-1970. McFarland. ISBN 978-0-7864-7636-7.
