= Lucas Atkinson =

American politician

Member of the South Carolina House of Representatives from the 57th district
- Incumbent
- Assumed office 2016
- Preceded by: J. Wayne George
- Succeeded by: Cynthia O. Ford

Personal details
- Born: July 6, 1981 (age 45) Florence, South Carolina, United States
- Party: Republican (2026–present); Democratic (before 2026)
- Education: Clemson University
- Profession: Consultant

Lucas Atkinson (born July 6, 1981) is an American politician. He is a member of the South Carolina House of Representatives from the 57th District, serving since 2016. He is a member of the Republican party.

== Background ==
Atkinson attended Clemson University and graduated in 2004. He works as a consultant.

== Electoral history ==
=== 2016 ===
After incumbent representative J. Wayne George decided to not seek re-election, Atkinson became a candidate for his seat in District 57. In the Democratic primary, he ran against two candidates, Lee Walter Jenkins Jr. and Ryan M. Waller. Atkinson won with 58.16% of the vote. In the general election, he defeated Republican Ethan Brown to win by 7,981 votes.

=== 2018 ===
Atkinson was unopposed in the Democratic primary and general election.

=== 2020 ===
In the Democratic primary held in June, Atkinson defeated Miko Pickett with 60.6% of the vote. He ran unopposed in the general election to win a third term.

=== 2026 ===
Atkinson was defeated in the general election by Democrat Cynthia O. Ford.

=== Committee assignments ===
- Agriculture, Natural Resources & Environmental Affairs
- Rules Committee

=== Election history ===
District 57 - Dillon, Horry, and Marion Counties
Year	Candidate	Votes	Pct	Candidate	Votes	Pct	Candidate	Votes	Pct
2016 Primary	Lucas Atkinson	4,489	58.16%	Lee Walter Jenkins Jr.	1,796	23.27%	Ryan M. Waller	1,433	18.57%
2016 General	Lucas Atkinson	10,172	80.66%	Ethan Brown	2,343	18.58%			
2018 Primary	Lucas Atkinson								
2018 General	Lucas Atkinson	8,946	98.98%						
2020 Primary	Lucas Atkinson	4,506	60.6%	Miko Pickett	2,933	39.4%			
2020 General	Lucas Atkinson	13,391	97.1%						
2022 General	Lucas Atkinson	8,500	98.5%						
2024 Primary	Lucas Atkinson	3,035	55.7%	Cynthia O. Ford	2,409	44.3%			
2024 General	Lucas Atkinson			Kevin Coleridge					
