= Waccamaw River Heritage Preserve =

Protected wetland in northeastern Horry County, South Carolina, U.S.

Coordinates: 33.905°N 78.729°W

The Waccamaw River Heritage Preserve is a 5,347-acre (21.64 km^{2}), 30-mile (48 km) stretch of protected wetland that follows the Waccamaw River in northeastern Horry County, South Carolina.

== Description ==
The Waccamaw River Heritage Preserve spans from the South Carolina state border to the north to a public boat ramp at Red Bluff, to the south. Roughly encompassing the Waccamaw River on either side, the preserve's property consists of small, partially connected parcels of land that are legally protected by the state.
