= Cynthia Ford =

Cynthia O. Ford

Member of the South Carolina House of Representatives from the 57th district
- Incumbent
- Assumed office 2026
- Preceded by: Lucas Atkinson

Personal details
- Party: Democratic

Cynthia O. Ford is an American politician. She is a member-elect of the South Carolina House of Representatives from the 57th District, since 2026. She is a member of the Democratic party

== Background ==
Ford lives in Mullins and works for Marion County.

== Electoral history ==
=== 2026 ===
Ford defeated Republican incumbent Lucas Atkinson in the general election.
