= Tuckahoe Bay =

Protected area in South Carolina, USA

- Location within the United States
- Location: South Carolina, USA
- Nearest city: Myrtle Beach, SC
- Coordinates: 33°46′6″N 78°56′41″W
- Area: 91 acres (37 ha)
- Governing body: U.S. Army Corps of Engineers

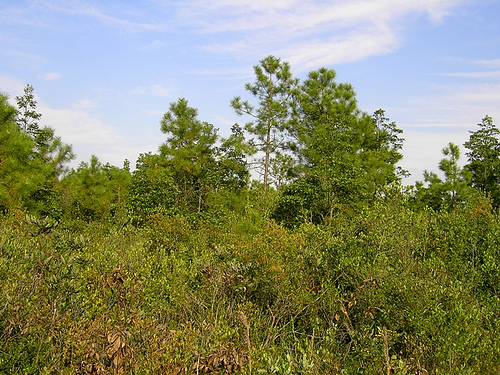
Tuckahoe Bay bordering a subdivision in Carolina Forest

Tuckahoe Bay is located in Horry County, South Carolina, in the Nixonville Quadrangle of South Carolina. It is a Carolina bay, which is similar to a swamp with an oval shape. The bay is next to the Covington Lake and Waterford Plantation neighborhoods in Carolina Forest, a suburb of Myrtle Beach, South Carolina. It is noted that the flora in the bay is noticeably shorter than that of the surrounding area. This is due to the difference in soil type. Tuckahoe Bay has a Jo soil type, also known as a Johnston Loam.

== History ==
The name 'Tuckahoe' is a Native-American word that associates itself with edible plants. The name 'Tuckahoe Bay' has an unknown origin, probably a name from a resident in Horry County. The first map to use the term was platted in October 1845 by Cornelius B. Sarvis. The plat included Socastee Swamp and totaled an area of 5,760.

Tuckahoe Bay has been on several topography maps, including some dating back to 1938. An early aerial map taken by the Ocean Forest Company in the early 1930s shows what Carolina bays looked like and also shows Tuckahoe Bay when it was undisturbed. Even as current development is abundant around the area, the bay has remained untouched.

== Recent developments ==
Two recent developments have changed the natural setting of Tuckahoe Bay, the building of a power line through the middle of the bay and the Carolina Forest development.

=== Conway Bombing Range ===
In the 1940s, the area now known as Carolina Forest was used as a practice bombing range. Although Tuckahoe Bay was undisturbed, other Carolina bays around the area were, including Briery Bay which is located east of the Plantation Lakes neighborhood.

=== Santee Cooper Power Line ===
Santee Cooper is the local power company for the Myrtle Beach area. A long transmitter line was built before Tuckahoe Bay was preserved under law. If you can see aerial views of the area, the power line's location through the bay is noticeable.

=== Carolina Forest ===
The Carolina Forest development has changed the surroundings of Tuckahoe Bay. Covington Lake was built to the southwest of the bay and Waterford Plantation was built to the northwest. Each neighborhood was established in 1996 and continues to grow. A 2-acre (8,100 m^{2}) site is located buffering the bay which includes wetland area and buffer areas for the preservation of the wetlands. A 15-foot (4.6 m) easement was also set in place along Covington Lake's border with Tuckahoe Bay.
