= ElDorado National =

ElDorado National is the name of a former bus manufacturer that has since been split into two companies:

- ElDorado (bus manufacturer) (formerly El Dorado National–Kansas), a manufacturer of cutaway buses based in Salina, Kansas.
- ENC (company) (formerly El Dorado National–California), a manufacturer of heavy-duty transit buses based in Riverside, California.
