= Homewood, South Carolina =

Coordinates: 33°53′03″N 79°02′54″W

- Census-designated place
- Interactive map of Homewood, South Carolina
- Country: United States
- State: South Carolina
- County: Horry

Area
  - Total: 2.07 sq mi (5.36 km^{2})
  - Land: 2.03 sq mi (5.26 km^{2})
  - Water: 0.039 sq mi (0.10 km^{2})
- Elevation: 26 ft (7.9 m)

Population (2020)
  - Total: 1,693
  - Density: 833.8/sq mi (321.95/km^{2})
- Time zone: UTC-5 (Eastern (EST))
  - Summer (DST): UTC-4 (EDT)
- ZIP Code: 29526 (Conway)
- Area code: 843
- FIPS code: 45-34765
- GNIS feature ID: 2812963

Homewood is an unincorporated community and census-designated place (CDP) in Horry County, South Carolina, United States, just north of Conway in the northeastern part of the state. It was first listed as a CDP in the 2020 census with a population of 1,693.

Homewood is located at the junction of South Carolina Highway 319 and U.S. Highway 701. There is an elementary school in the community. Many of the inhabitants make a living from family farms, growing tobacco, corn, soybeans, and tomatoes.

== Demographics ==
Historical population
Census	Pop.	Note	%±
2020	1,693		—
U.S. Decennial Census; 2020

Homewood first appeared as a census designated place in the 2020 U.S. census.

=== 2020 census ===
Homewood CDP, South Carolina – Demographic Profile (NH = Non-Hispanic)
Race / Ethnicity	Pop 2020	% 2020
White alone (NH)	940	55.52%
Black or African American alone (NH)	383	22.62%
Native American or Alaska Native alone (NH)	14	0.83%
Asian alone (NH)	17	1.00%
Pacific Islander alone (NH)	0	0.00%
Some Other Race alone (NH)	7	0.41%
Mixed Race/Multi-Racial (NH)	75	4.43%
Hispanic or Latino (any race)	257	15.18%
Total	1,693	100.00%

Note: the US Census treats Hispanic/Latino as an ethnic category. This table excludes Latinos from the racial categories and assigns them to a separate category. Hispanics/Latinos can be of any race.

== Education ==
Horry County School District is the sole school district in the county.
