= Live Oak, South Carolina =

- Census-designated place
- Location within South Carolina Location within the United States
- Coordinates: 34°03′22″N 78°56′23″W
- Country: United States
- State: South Carolina
- County: Horry

Area
  - Total: 0.84 sq mi (2.18 km^{2})
  - Land: 0.84 sq mi (2.18 km^{2})
  - Water: 0 sq mi (0.00 km^{2})
- Elevation: 102 ft (31 m)

Population (2020)
  - Total: 93
  - Density: 110.3/sq mi (42.58/km^{2})
- Time zone: UTC-5 (Eastern (EST))
  - Summer (DST): UTC-4 (EDT)
- ZIP Code: 29569 (Loris)
- Area codes: 843/854
- FIPS code: 45-42095
- GNIS feature ID: 2812964

Live Oak is an unincorporated community and census-designated place (CDP) in Horry County, South Carolina, United States. As of the 2020 census it had a population of 93.

The CDP is in northeastern Horry County, 3 miles (5 km) west of Loris and 18 miles (29 km) northeast of Conway, the county seat.

== Demographics ==
Historical population
Census	Pop.	Note	%±
2020	93		—
U.S. Decennial Census; 2020

Live Oak first appeared as a census designated place in the 2020 U.S. census.

=== 2020 census ===
Live Oak CDP, South Carolina – Demographic Profile (NH = Non-Hispanic)
Race / Ethnicity	Pop 2020	% 2020
White alone (NH)	56	60.22%
Black or African American alone (NH)	28	30.11%
Native American or Alaska Native alone (NH)	2	2.15%
Asian alone (NH)	0	0.00%
Pacific Islander alone (NH)	0	0.00%
Some Other Race alone (NH)	0	0.00%
Mixed Race/Multi-Racial (NH)	5	5.38%
Hispanic or Latino (any race)	2	2.15%
Total	93	100.00%

Note: the US Census treats Hispanic/Latino as an ethnic category. This table excludes Latinos from the racial categories and assigns them to a separate category. Hispanics/Latinos can be of any race.

== Education ==
Horry County School District is the sole school district in the county.
