= Ketchuptown, South Carolina =

Census-designated place in South Carolina, United States

- Census-designated place
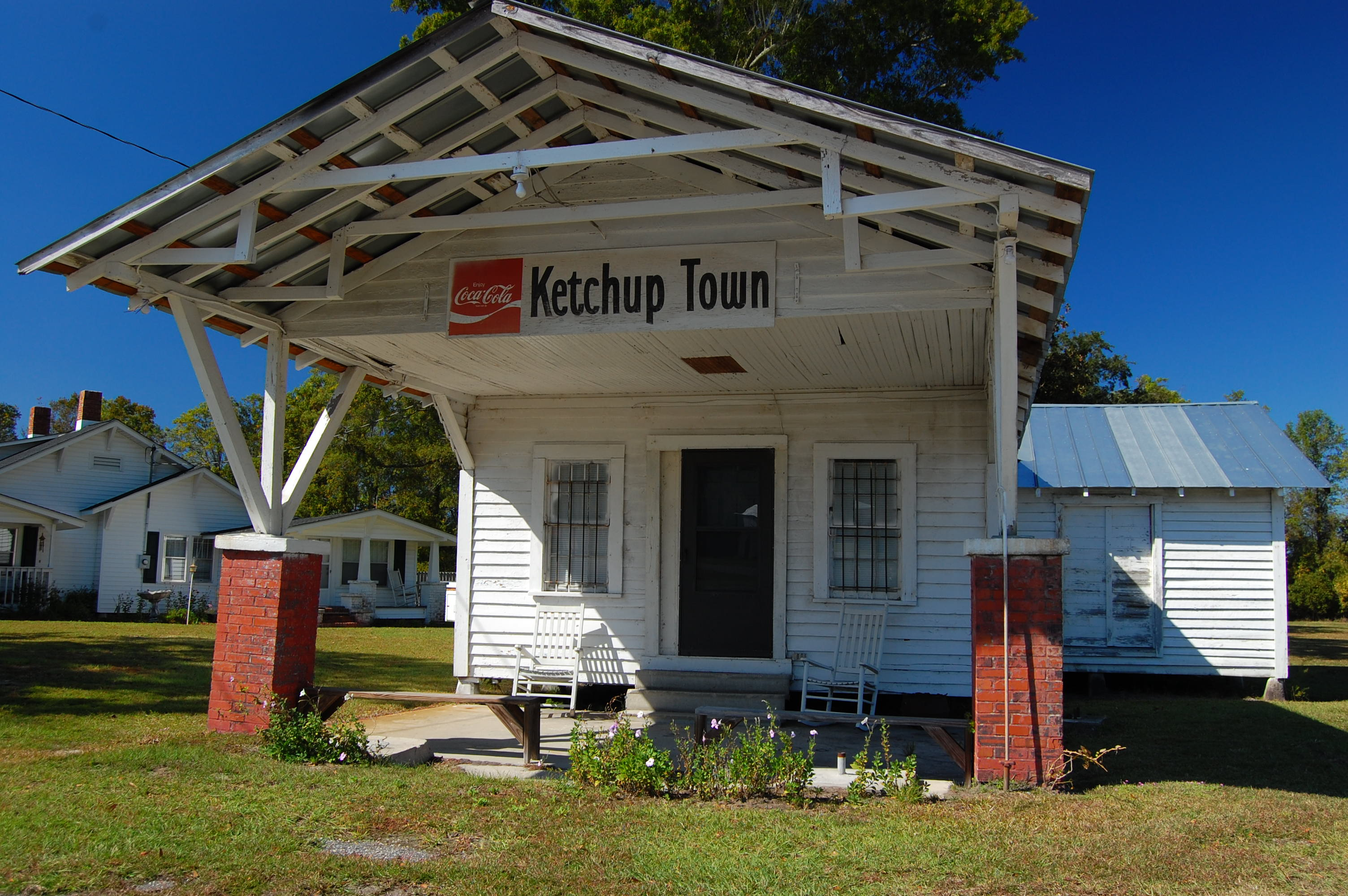
- Country store at the crossroads

- Location within South Carolina Location within the United States
- Coordinates: 34°07′05″N 79°09′25″W
- Country: United States
- State: South Carolina
- County: Horry
- Established: 1920s

Area
  - Total: 2.71 sq mi (7.02 km^{2})
  - Land: 2.71 sq mi (7.02 km^{2})
  - Water: 0 sq mi (0.00 km^{2})
- Elevation: 72 ft (22 m)

Population (2020)
  - Total: 84
  - Density: 31.0/sq mi (11.97/km^{2})
- Time zone: UTC-5 (Eastern (EST))
  - Summer (DST): UTC-4 (EDT)
- ZIP Code: 29581 (Nichols)
- Area code: 843
- FIPS code: 45-38110
- GNIS feature ID: 2812961

Ketchuptown is a historic unincorporated community and census-designated place (CDP) located in Horry County, South Carolina, United States. Ketchuptown is at the intersection of Highways 23 and 99, about 9 miles (14 km) north of Aynor. As of the 2020 census, it had a population of 84.

== Demographics ==
Historical population
Census	Pop.	Note	%±
2020	84		—
U.S. Decennial Census; 2020

Ketchuptown first appeared as a census designated place in the 2020 U.S. census.

=== 2020 census ===
Ketchuptown CDP, South Carolina – Demographic Profile (NH = Non-Hispanic)
Race / Ethnicity	Pop 2020	% 2020
White alone (NH)	63	75.00%
Black or African American alone (NH)	0	0.00%
Native American or Alaska Native alone (NH)	3	3.57%
Asian alone (NH)	0	0.00%
Pacific Islander alone (NH)	0	0.00%
Some Other Race alone (NH)	0	0.00%
Mixed Race/Multi-Racial (NH)	0	0.00%
Hispanic or Latino (any race)	18	21.43%
Total	84	100.00%

Note: the US Census treats Hispanic/Latino as an ethnic category. This table excludes Latinos from the racial categories and assigns them to a separate category. Hispanics/Latinos can be of any race.

== Education ==
Horry County School District is the sole school district in the county.
