= Konig, South Carolina =

- Populated place and Unincorporated Community
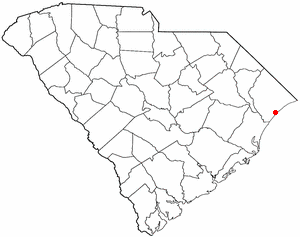
- Location of Konig, South Carolina
- Coordinates: 33°42′43″N 78°55′18″W
- Country: United States
- State: South Carolina
- County: Horry
- Elevation: 23 ft (7.0 m)
- Time zone: UTC-5 (Eastern (EST))
  - Summer (DST): UTC-4 (EDT)
- ZIP code: 29577
- Area codes: 843, 854
- GNIS feature ID: 1223771

Konig is an unincorporated community and populated place in Horry County, South Carolina, United States. It is located near the intersections of US Route 17 and US Route 501 in Myrtle Beach.
