= Goretown, South Carolina =

- Unincorporated community
- Location within South Carolina Location within the United States
- Coordinates: 34°01′37″N 78°49′16″W
- Country: United States
- State: South Carolina
- County: Horry
- Elevation: 105 ft (32 m)
- Time zone: UTC-5 (Eastern (EST))
  - Summer (DST): UTC-4 (EDT)
- ZIP Code: 29569
- Area codes: 843 and 854
- GNIS feature ID: 1231333

Goretown (also Gore Town) is an unincorporated community in Horry County, South Carolina, United States. Goretown is located east of Loris along SC 9 Business.
