= Cool Spring, South Carolina =

Unincorporated community in South Carolina, United States

- Unincorporated Community
- Nickname: Cool Springs
- Interactive map of Cool Spring, South Carolina
- Coordinates: 33°58′31″N 79°08′13″W
- Country: United States
- State: South Carolina
- County: Horry
- Elevation: 95 ft (29 m)
- Time zone: UTC-5 (Eastern (EST))
  - Summer (DST): UTC-4 (EDT)
- ZIP Code: 29511
- Area code: 843
- GNIS feature ID: 1221732

Cool Spring (sometimes known as Cool Springs) is a small unincorporated community in Horry County, South Carolina, United States. Cool Spring lies approximately twelve miles north of Conway and about four miles southeast of Aynor on South Carolina Highway 319. It is a historic community known for its small spring and was referred to by local residents many years ago as the cool springs.
