= Allsbrook, South Carolina =

- Unincorporated Community
- Location within South Carolina Location within the United States
- Country: United States
- State: South Carolina
- County: Horry
- Time zone: Eastern
- ZIP Code: 29569
- Area code: 843

Allsbrook is an unincorporated community in Horry County, in the U.S. state of South Carolina.

== History ==
An early variant name was "Sanford". A rail stop was located in the settlement. A post office called Allsbrook was established in 1915, and remained in operation until 1947. The present name is after N. B. Allsbrook and J. R. Allsbrook, brothers and first settlers.
