= South Carolina Highway 90 =

State highway in South Carolina, U.S.

South Carolina Highway 90

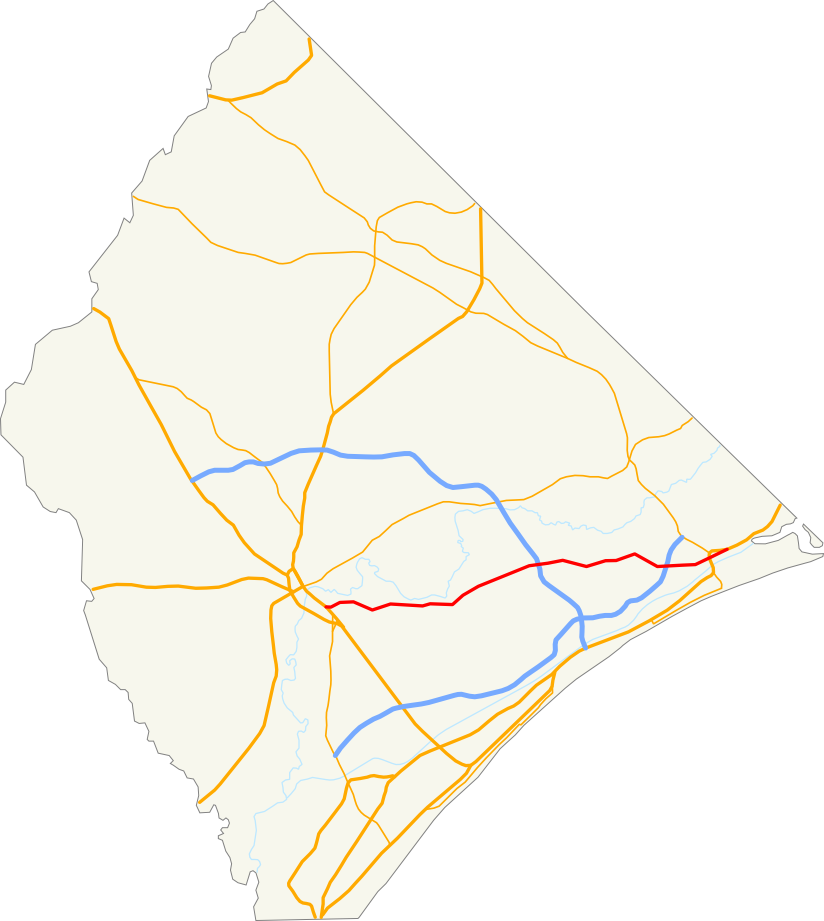
- SC 90 highlighted in red

Route information
- Maintained by SCDOT
- Length: 23.110 mi (37.192 km)
- Existed: 1930–present

Major junctions
- West end: US 501 Bus. in Red Hill
- SC 22 near Briarcliffe Acres; Robert Edge Parkway near North Myrtle Beach; US 17 / SC 9 in Little River
- East end: US 17 in Little River

Location
- Country: United States
- State: South Carolina
- Counties: Horry

Highway system
- South Carolina State Highway System; Interstate; US; State; Scenic
← SC 88	→ SC 91

South Carolina Highway 90 (SC 90) is a 23.110-mile (37.192 km) state highway in Horry County, within the northeastern part of the U.S. state of South Carolina. It travels from Red Hill (near Conway) to Little River. It provides a direct connection from Conway to the northern Grand Strand in Little River.

== Route description ==
SC 90 begins at an intersection with US 378 Truck/U.S. Route 501 Bus./US 701 Truck/SC 90 Truck in the census designated place (CDP) of Red Hill. SC 90, concurrent with US 378 Truck and US 701 Truck, travels east, first briefly through an area of industrial warehouses, then on an arc curving to the south past numerous houses. After turning to the east again, outside of Red Hill, the density of houses lining the road decreases. The truck routes split off at Old Reaves Ferry Road. Major roads that SC 90 intersects include International Drive (providing a connection to Robert Grissom Parkway in Myrtle Beach) and Old Reaves Ferry Road (providing a connection with SC 905). After an interchange with SC 22, the highway enters the community of Wampee. The highway curves to the southeast at S-Hwy 57 where it heads through open space and farmland. It reaches an intersection with Robert Edge Parkway (unsigned SC 31 Conn.) near North Myrtle Beach. The intersection marks the western terminus of the parkway and is the entrance to the North Myrtle Beach Sports Complex. The parkway also provides access to SC 31 (Carolina Bays Parkway).

SC 90 heads east, first under SC 31, then past numerous housing developments. It also passes in front of North Myrtle Beach Middle School. Upon its intersection with Sea Mountain Highway, much more commercial businesses line the highway. The highway also enters the CDP of Little River at this intersection. Shortly thereafter, Old Highway 17 (unsigned SC 90 Conn.) intersects SC 90. It comes to an interchange with US 17 and SC 9, though no access to northbound US 17/SC 9 is provided at the interchange. For its final one mile (1.6 km), SC 90 passes many businesses before curving to the north and ending at an intersection with US 17. Here, the roadway continues as Fairway Drive.

== History ==
South Carolina Highway 90 was established in 1929, routed from the former South Carolina Highway 38 to South Carolina Highway 9. In 1935, SC 90 was extended east over SC 9 to end at US 17/SC 9 (now S-26-20) in Nixon Crossroads. In the late 1930s, SC 90 underwent several extensions in Marion County, before being truncated in 1952 to its present-day endpoint in Conway.

In 1970, SC 90 was extended east over US 17 to the current SC 90 endpoint.

In 2009, SC 90 was rerouted slightly to accommodate the construction of the Robert Edge Parkway. This provides SC 90 with nearly direct access to the SC 31 freeway.

== Major intersections ==
The entire route is in Horry County.

Location	mi	km	Destinations	Notes
Red Hill	0.000	0.000	US 378 Truck south / US 501 Bus. / US 701 Truck south (SC 90 Truck west) – Conway, Myrtle Beach	Western end of US 378 Truck/US 701 Truck concurrency; western terminus of SC 90; eastern terminus of SC 90 Truck
	10.064	16.196	Old Reaves Ferry Road west (US 378 Truck north / US 701 Truck north)	Eastern end of US 378 Truck/US 701 Truck concurrency; eastern terminus of Old Reaves Road
	12.726– 12.742	20.481– 20.506	SC 22 – North Myrtle Beach, Myrtle Beach, Marion	Interchange
North Myrtle Beach	19.470	31.334	Robert Edge Parkway south (SC 31 Conn. south) / Champions Boulevard south – Downtown North Myrtle Beach	Northern terminus of SC 31 Conn., Robert Edge Parkway, and Champions Boulevard; to SC 31 / US 501 / SC 9
Little River	22.080	35.534	Sea Mountain Highway to US 17 south / SC 9 – Loris	
Little River	22.110	35.583	Old Highway 17 south (SC 90 Conn. west)	Eastern terminus of SC 90 Conn.; northern terminus of Old Highway 17; former US 17 south
Little River	22.271– 22.330	35.842– 35.937	US 17 south / SC 9 south – Cherry Grove Beach, North Myrtle Beach	No US 17/SC 9 northbound entrance; interchange
Little River	23.110	37.192	US 17 / Fairway Drive north	Eastern terminus
1.000 mi = 1.609 km; 1.000 km = 0.621 mi: Incomplete access

== Special routes ==
=== Conway truck route ===
South Carolina Highway 90 Truck
- Location: Conway–Red Hill, South Carolina
- Length: 3.910 mi (6.293 km)

South Carolina Highway 90 Truck (SC 90 Truck) is a truck route of SC 90 that partially exists in Conway and Red Hill. It directs truck traffic onto U.S. Route 501 (US 501), SC 544 Conn., and US 501 Business (US 501 Bus.). It is loosely signed. Its entire length is concurrent with US 378 Truck and US 701 Truck.

=== Conway alternate route ===
South Carolina Highway 90 Alternate
- Location: Conway
- Existed: 1937–1947

South Carolina Highway 90 Alternate (SC 90 Alt.) was an alternate route that existed in the southeastern part of Conway and the far northern part of Red Hill. It was established in April 1937 and began at an intersection with US 501/SC 90 (now US 501 Business). It traveled to the east and immediately curved to the north-northeast. Just before reaching the Waccamaw River, it began a curve to the southeast and started to parallel the river. Just past the point where the river bent away from the highway, the alternate route curved to the south-southeast. It had an intersection with SC 90 on the Conway–Red Hill line. It continued until it reached its eastern terminus, a second intersection with US 501 (now US 501 Bus. and Washington Avenue).

=== Little River connector route ===
South Carolina Highway 90 Connector
- Location: Little River, South Carolina
- Length: 0.170 mi (274 m)

South Carolina Highway 90 Connector (SC 90 Conn.) is a 0.170-mile (0.274 km) connector route of SC 90 that travels on a former segment of U.S. Route 17 (US 17) in the extreme southwestern corner of Little River. It connects Sea Mountain Highway with SC 90. It is known as Old Highway 17 and is an unsigned highway.
