= Little River, South Carolina =

- CDP
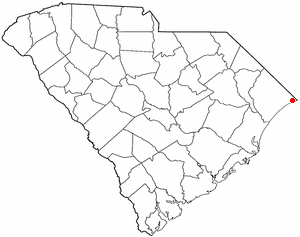
- Location of Little River in South Carolina
- Coordinates: 33°52′32″N 78°37′40″W
- Country: United States
- State: South Carolina
- County: Horry

Area
  - Total: 10.82 sq mi (28.03 km^{2})
  - Land: 10.48 sq mi (27.14 km^{2})
  - Water: 0.34 sq mi (0.89 km^{2})
- Elevation: 39 ft (12 m)

Population (2020)
  - Total: 11,711
  - Density: 1,117.6/sq mi (431.49/km^{2})
- Time zone: UTC-5 (EST)
  - Summer (DST): UTC-4 (EDT)
- ZIP code: 29566
- Area codes: 843, 854
- FIPS code: 45-42010
- GNIS feature ID: 2403238
- Website: www.littleriversc.com

Little River is a census-designated place (CDP) in Horry County, South Carolina, United States. The population was 11,711 at the 2020 census.

Little River is named for the Little River, which flows into the Atlantic Ocean at the state line between North Carolina and South Carolina. The Little River inlet has long been a breakpoint for tropical cyclone warnings. It initially developed as a suburb of North Myrtle Beach, allowing easy access to the city while avoiding its taxes.

== Geography ==
According to the United States Census Bureau, the CDP has a total area of 10.8 square miles (28.0 km^{2}), of which 10.5 square miles (27.1 km^{2}) is land and 0.4 square mile (0.9 km^{2}) (3.33%) is water. The area is mainly made up of housing developments, old scrub pine forests, marshes and swamps and is bordered by the Waccamaw River and the Atlantic Intracoastal waterway. Live oaks, Spanish moss, crepe myrtle trees and palm trees dot the landscape.

== Demographics ==
Historical population
Census	Pop.	Note	%±
2000	7,027		—
2010	8,960		27.5%
2020	11,711		30.7%
U.S. Decennial Census

=== 2020 census ===
As of the 2020 census, Little River had a population of 11,711. The median age was 60.1 years. 11.0% of residents were under the age of 18 and 39.3% were 65 years of age or older. For every 100 females there were 85.4 males, and for every 100 females age 18 and over there were 83.2 males age 18 and over.

97.6% of residents lived in urban areas, while 2.4% lived in rural areas.

There were 5,957 households, including 2,633 families, in Little River. 13.9% of households had children under the age of 18 living in them. Of all households, 43.4% were married-couple households, 18.5% were households with a male householder and no spouse or partner present, and 31.2% were households with a female householder and no spouse or partner present. About 36.9% of all households were made up of individuals, and 20.4% had someone living alone who was 65 years of age or older.

There were 8,098 housing units, of which 26.4% were vacant. The homeowner vacancy rate was 3.4% and the rental vacancy rate was 13.3%.

Little River racial composition
Race	Num.	Perc.
White (non-Hispanic)	9,873	84.31%
Black or African American (non-Hispanic)	669	5.71%
Native American	62	0.53%
Asian	116	0.99%
Pacific Islander	15	0.13%
Other/Mixed	470	4.01%
Hispanic or Latino	506	4.32%

=== 2000 census ===
As of the census of 2000, there were 7,027 people, 3,287 households, and 2,225 families residing in the CDP. The population density was 671.9 inhabitants per square mile (259.4/km^{2}). There were 4,715 housing units at an average density of 450.8 per square mile (174.1/km^{2}). The racial makeup of the CDP was 91.40% White, 6.80% African American, 0.43% Native American, 0.28% Asian, 0.04% Pacific Islander, 0.34% from other races, and 0.70% from two or more races. Hispanic or Latino, of any race, were 1.02% of the population.

There were 3,287 households, out of which 18.6% had children under the age of 18 living with them, 57.0% were married couples living together, 8.4% had a female householder with no husband present, and 32.3% were non-families. 26.0% of all households were made up of individuals, and 10.5% had someone living alone who was 65 years of age or older. The average household size was 2.14 and the average family size was 2.53.

In the CDP, the population was spread out, with 15.7% under the age of 18, 4.7% from 18 to 24, 24.2% from 25 to 44, 31.9% from 45 to 64, and 23.4% who were 65 years of age or older. The median age was 49 years. For every 100 females, there were 92.7 males. For every 100 females age 18 and over, there were 91.8 males.

The median income for a household in the CDP was $40,427, and the median income for a family was $45,243. Males had a median income of $36,086 versus $22,348 for females. The per capita income for the CDP was $22,733. About 4.7% of families and 7.5% of the population were below the poverty line, including 15.3% of those under age 18 and 1.7% of those age 65 or over.

== Arts and culture ==
The community is host to an annual Blue Crab Festival each May.

During the 21 years that South Carolina had legalized video poker, Little River's location near the North Carolina state line made the community a major center for the activity. In 1996, local churches began protesting legalized gambling in what had become Little Reno, and the state outlawed the games in 2000. Two years before the video poker ban, casino boats began operating and continue to do so in federal waters because the state has not specifically banned them. Little River has the state's only casino boat, The Big M Casino.

== Major highways ==
- US 17
- SC 9
- SC 31
- SC 90
- SC 179

== Education ==
Horry County School District is the sole school district in the county.

Little River has a public library, a branch of the Horry County Memorial Library.

== Wildlife ==
Little River common natural wildlife includes bobcats, lizards (geckos and anoles), amphibians (flatwoods salamander and Carolina gopher frog), non-lizard reptiles (water snakes, yellow-bellied turtles and alligators), wading birds and mammals (black bear and bobcat).
