= North Myrtle Beach, South Carolina =

- City
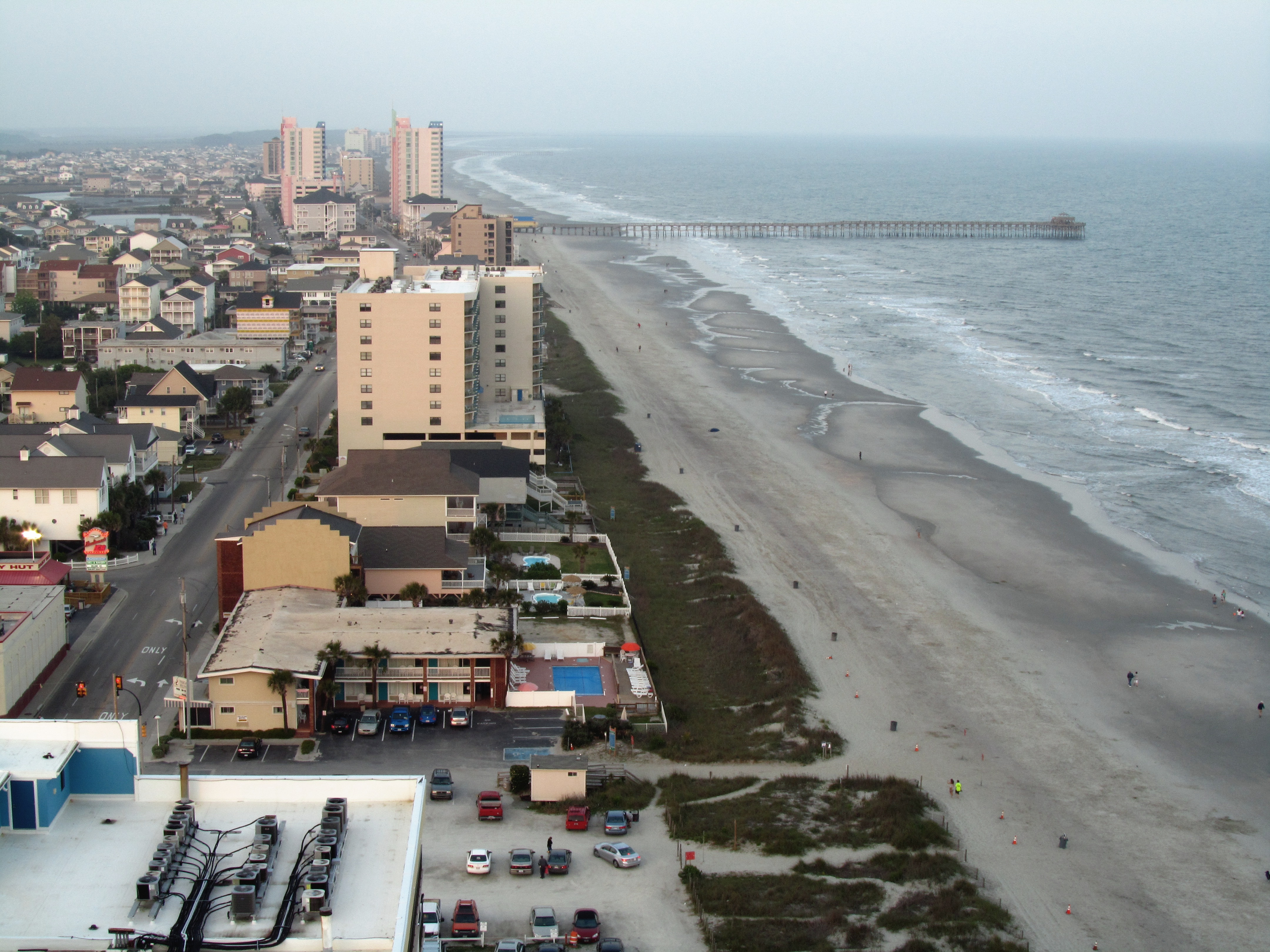
- Cherry Grove Beach in North Myrtle Beach

- Flag Seal

- Location within South Carolina Location within the United States
- Coordinates: 33°49′40″N 78°41′25″W
- Country: United States
- State: South Carolina
- County: Horry
- First settled: 1735
- Incorporated: March 12, 1938

Government
  - Mayor: J. O. Baldwin III

Area
  - City: 22.31 sq mi (57.77 km^{2})
  - Land: 21.74 sq mi (56.30 km^{2})
  - Water: 0.57 sq mi (1.47 km^{2})
- Elevation: 26 ft (7.9 m)

Population (2020)
  - City: 18,790
  - Density: 864.4/sq mi (333.75/km^{2})
  - Urban: 298,954 (US: 135th)
  - Urban density: 1,365/sq mi (527.2/km^{2})
  - Metro: 487,722 (US: 111th)
- Time zone: UTC−5 (EST)
  - Summer (DST): UTC−4 (EDT)
- ZIP codes: 29566, 29568, 29582, 29597, 29598,
- Area codes: 843, 854
- FIPS code: 45-51280
- GNIS feature ID: 2404397
- Website: www.nmb.us

North Myrtle Beach is a city in Horry County, South Carolina, United States. It was created in 1968 from four existing municipalities, and is located about 15 miles (24 km) northeast of Myrtle Beach. It serves as one of the primary tourist destinations along the Grand Strand.

As of the 2020 census, the population was 18,790. It is part of the Myrtle Beach-Conway-North Myrtle Beach, SC Metropolitan Statistical Area, which had a combined population of 449,295 as of 2016.

== History ==
In 1737, William Gause obtained a grant to 250 acres (100 ha) of land near Windy Hill Beach. He farmed the area and also established a tavern for travelers along the Kings Highway.

North Myrtle Beach was created in 1968 with the consolidation of Cherry Grove Beach, Crescent Beach, Ocean Drive Beach, and Windy Hill Beach.

== Geography ==
North Myrtle Beach is located in eastern Horry County. It is bordered to the southwest by Briarcliffe Acres and to the northeast by Little River. Via US 17, it is 15 miles (24 km) northeast of Myrtle Beach and 60 miles (97 km) southwest of Wilmington. Via SC 9 it is 67 miles (108 km) southeast of I-95 near Dillon.

According to the United States Census Bureau, the city has a total area of 17.7 square miles (45.8 km^{2}), of which 17.1 square miles (44.3 km^{2}) are land and 0.62 square miles (1.6 km^{2}), or 3.39%, are water.

The area is divided into four separate areas based on its former municipalities. These are Windy Hill, Crescent Beach, Ocean Drive, and Cherry Grove, a spit bordering North Carolina. Atlantic Beach, which is bordered on three sides by North Myrtle Beach, chose to remain its own town during the merger.

=== Neighborhoods ===
- Barefoot
- Bell's Lake
- Cherry Grove Beach
- Crescent Beach
- Ingram Beach
- Little River Neck
- Ocean Creek
- Ocean Drive Beach
- Park Pointe
- Seabrook Plantation
- Tidewater
- Windy Hill Beach

== Demographics ==
Historical population
Census	Pop.	Note	%±
1970	1,957		—
1980	3,960		102.4%
1990	8,636		118.1%
2000	10,974		27.1%
2010	13,752		25.3%
2020	18,790		36.6%
2025 (est.)	21,346	▲	13.6%
U.S. Decennial Census

=== 2020 census ===
As of the 2020 census, there were 18,790 people, 9,714 households, and 4,583 families residing in the city.

The median age was 62.5 years. 8.6% of residents were under the age of 18 and 43.5% of residents were 65 years of age or older. For every 100 females there were 93.1 males, and for every 100 females age 18 and over there were 91.7 males age 18 and over.

98.7% of residents lived in urban areas, while 1.3% lived in rural areas.

Of those households, 10.5% had children under the age of 18 living in them. Of all households, 51.8% were married-couple households, 16.9% were households with a male householder and no spouse or partner present, and 25.7% were households with a female householder and no spouse or partner present. About 32.9% of all households were made up of individuals and 19.2% had someone living alone who was 65 years of age or older.

There were 25,950 housing units, of which 62.6% were vacant. The homeowner vacancy rate was 4.0% and the rental vacancy rate was 55.8%.

Racial composition as of the 2020 census
Race	Number	Percent
White	16,997	90.5%
Black or African American	419	2.2%
American Indian and Alaska Native	79	0.4%
Asian	148	0.8%
Native Hawaiian and Other Pacific Islander	11	0.1%
Some other race	331	1.8%
Two or more races	805	4.3%
Hispanic or Latino (of any race)	799	4.3%

=== 2000 census ===
As of the census of 2000, there were 10,974 people, 5,406 households, and 3,130 families residing in the city. The population density was 841.6 inhabitants per square mile (324.9/km^{2}). There were 18,091 housing units at an average density of 1,387.5 per square mile (535.7/km^{2}). The racial makeup of the city was 94.50% White, 2.31% African American, 0.47% Native American, 0.64% Asian, 0.14% Pacific Islander, 1.06% from other races, and 0.89% from two or more races. Hispanic or Latino residents of any race were 2.36% of the population.

There were 5,406 households, out of which 15.1% had children under the age of 18 living with them, 47.5% were married couples living together, 6.9% had a female householder with no husband present, and 42.1% were non-families. 33.2% of all households were made up of individuals, and 11.0% had someone living alone who was 65 years of age or older. The average household size was 2.03 and the average family size was 2.53.

In the city, the population distribution by age was 13.8% under the age of 18, 6.1% from 18 to 24, 25.9% from 25 to 44, 32.8% from 45 to 64, and 21.5% who were 65 years of age or older. The median age was 48 years. For every 100 females, there were 99.5 males. For every 100 females age 18 and over, there were 98.2 males.

The median income for a household in the city was $38,787, and the median income for a family was $46,052. Males had a median income of $30,189 versus $22,119 for females. The per capita income for the city was $27,006. About 5.1% of families and 8.5% of the population were below the poverty line, including 12.8% of those under age 18 and 4.8% of those age 65 or over.

== Arts and culture ==
North Myrtle Beach has a public library, a branch of the Horry County Memorial Library.

== Government ==
North Myrtle Beach adheres to the Council-Manager form of government. The current mayor is J. O. Baldwin III. The current council members are Hank Thomas (Mayor pro tempore), Bubba Collins, Trey Skidmore, Melissa Wober, and Fred Coyne. The current City Manager is Ryan Fabbri.

== Education ==
Horry County School District is the sole school district in the county.

Schools in the North Myrtle Beach area include:

- Ocean Drive Elementary School
- Riverside Elementary School
- Waterway Elementary School
- North Myrtle Beach Middle School
- North Myrtle Beach High School (in nearby Little River)

== Infrastructure ==
=== Transportation ===
==== Road ====
- US 17
- SC 9
- SC 31
- SC 65 (Ocean Boulevard)
- SC 90
- Robert Edge Parkway

==== Air ====
North Myrtle Beach is home to a single terminal, the Grand Strand Airport, serving primarily banner planes and small aircraft. The airfield is located in the heart of the city. The airport generates over $10.1 million in local economic output.

==== Bus ====
North Myrtle Beach is served by the Coast RTA, formerly Waccamaw RTA or Lymo.

== Notable people ==
- Alyssa Arce, fashion model
- Temarrick Hemingway, NFL tight end
- Ryan Quigley, NFL punter
- Lou Saban, former professional football player and coach
- Kelly Tilghman, Golf Channel broadcaster and PGA Tour's first female lead golf announcer
- Sadler Vaden, musician, best known as a member of Jason Isbell's band, The 400 Unit
- Vanna White, television personality known for co-hosting Wheel of Fortune
