= Wampee, South Carolina =

Coordinates: 33°51′38″N 78°44′3″W

- Unincorporated Community
- Interactive map of Wampee, South Carolina
- Country: United States
- State: South Carolina
- County: Horry
- Elevation: 33 ft (10 m)
- Time zone: UTC-5 (Eastern (EST))
  - Summer (DST): UTC-4 (EDT)
- ZIP Code: 29566, 29568
- Area code: 843
- GNIS feature ID: 1227391

Wampee is an unincorporated community in Horry County, South Carolina, United States, along South Carolina Highway 90. Wampee is located near North Myrtle Beach across from the Intracoastal Waterway. Robert Edge Parkway starts here.
