= Waccamaw River =

River in the United States of America

Coordinates: 33.3585005°N 79.2567169°W

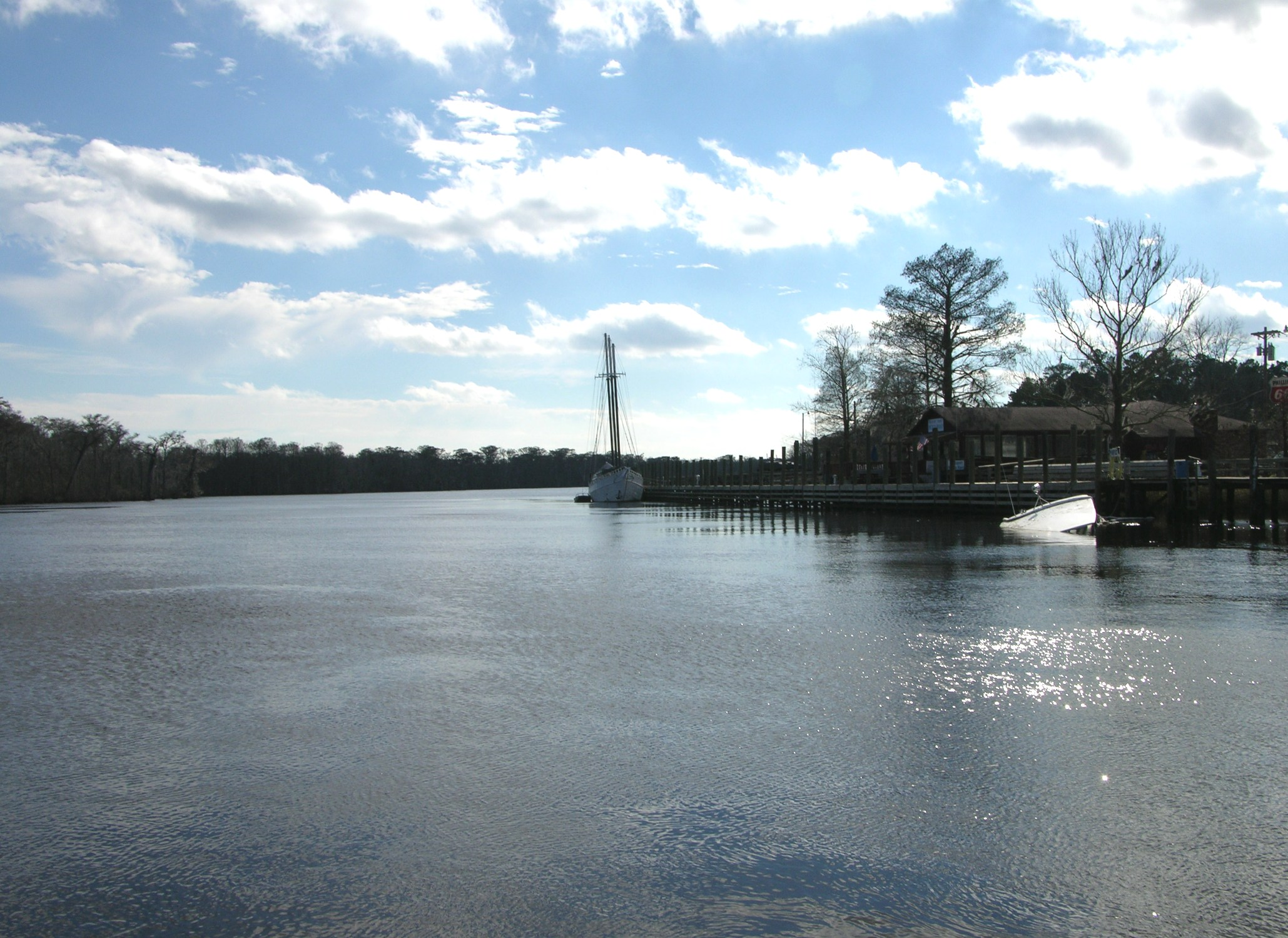
Bucksport, South Carolina – Quiet in winter, a busy stretch of the Intracoastal Waterway in spring and fall when snowbirds are boating north and south

The Waccamaw River is a river, approximately 140 miles (225 km) long, in southeastern North Carolina and eastern South Carolina in the United States. It drains an area of approximately 1,110 square miles (2886 km^{2}) in the coastal plain along the eastern border between the two states into the Atlantic Ocean. Along its upper course, it is a slow-moving, blackwater river surrounded by vast wetlands, passable only by shallow-draft watercraft such as canoe. Along its lower course, it is lined by sandy banks and old plantation houses, providing an important navigation channel with a unique geography, flowing roughly parallel to the coast.

== Description ==
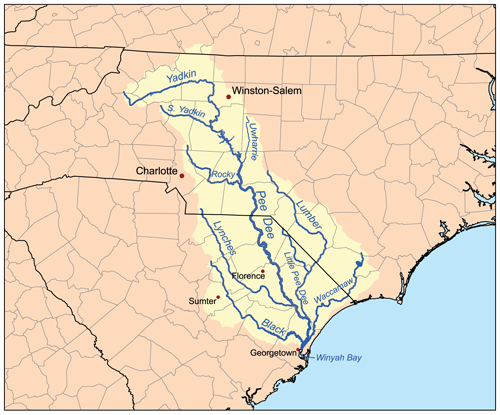
Map of the Pee Dee River country and watershed

The Waccamaw River begins its course at Lake Waccamaw, a Carolina bay in Columbus County, North Carolina. Downstream it forms the county line between Columbus and Brunswick counties, flowing generally southwest and parallel to the coastline; it is separated from the ocean by approximately 15 miles (24 km).

It enters South Carolina and flows southwest across Horry County, past Conway. Near Burgess, it is joined from the northwest by the Great Pee Dee River, which rises in north central North Carolina. It continues southwest, separated from the ocean by only five miles (8 km) in a long tidal estuary. The long narrow point of land along the ocean formed by the lower river is called Waccamaw Neck. At Georgetown it receives the Black River (South Carolina) from the north, then turns sharply to the southeast and enters the ocean at Winyah Bay, approximately five miles (8 km) north along the coast from the mouth of the Santee River.

Navigable as far as Conway, the lower river has been an important commercial route for European settlers in the region since the 18th century. Before that, it was equally important for various Native American cultures.

In the 19th century, planters developed extensive rice cultivation on lands of the lower Waccamaw River. They depended on the labor of thousands of enslaved Africans and their descendants to cultivate and process this labor-intensive crop. After the American Civil War, some of the large plantations were confiscated by the federal government. In addition, the emancipation of enslaved persons and new laws established a "free labor" market. Some planters established sharecropping or tenant farmers to gain workers, but as freedmen wanted to control some of their work. The rice industry declined under these conditions.

Since the early 20th century, the Waccamaw's lower course in South Carolina forms part of what is now known as the Atlantic Intracoastal Waterway. It joins the river from the northeast at Bucksport, South Carolina. Long important to trade and transportation, the waterway also began to be recognized for its recreational uses.

In addition, the river's extensive wetlands provide habitat for diverse species, including the Carolina pygmy sunfish and the American black bear.

"Extensive forest communities cover the Waccamaw floodplain, including cypress-gum swamp and bottomland hardwood forests. The bottomland hardwood forests of the Waccamaw are unique in the Carolinas in containing abundant Atlantic white cedar and live oaks, along with the more typical laurel and overcup oak and loblolly pine."

The Nature Conservancy has acquired a portion of the habitat for conservation and preservation. They control land along the Waccamaw, the lower Pee Dee and Little Pee Dee rivers for habitat preservation.

A much larger area was acquired by the federal government for the Waccamaw National Wildlife Refuge, established in 1997 near the confluence of these three rivers. Originally consisting of 22,931 acres (92.80 km^{2}), it is planned to have a total of 50,000 acres (200 km^{2}).

== See also ==
- List of North Carolina rivers
- List of South Carolina rivers
