= Garden City, South Carolina =

- CDP
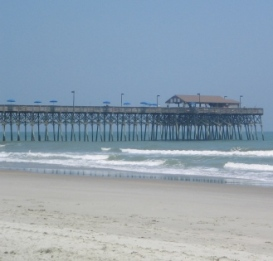
- The Pier at Garden City Beach
- Nickname: Garden City Beach
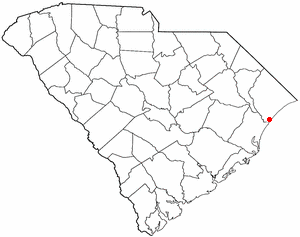
- Location in South Carolina
- Coordinates: 33°35′40″N 79°00′05″W
- Country: United States
- State: South Carolina
- County: Horry, Georgetown

Area
  - Total: 5.45 sq mi (14.12 km^{2})
  - Land: 5.34 sq mi (13.84 km^{2})
  - Water: 0.11 sq mi (0.28 km^{2})
- Elevation: 20 ft (6.1 m)

Population (2020)
  - Total: 10,235
  - Density: 1,914.9/sq mi (739.33/km^{2})
- Time zone: UTC-5 (Eastern (EST))
  - Summer (DST): UTC-4 (EDT)
- ZIP code: 29576
- Area codes: 843, 854
- FIPS code: 45-28455
- GNIS feature ID: 2402515

Garden City, sometimes known as Garden City Beach, is a census-designated place (CDP) in Horry County, South Carolina, United States. The population was 9,209 at the 2010 census. Garden City Beach is located directly south of Surfside Beach. The developed part of the beach extends south beyond the limits of the Garden City CDP, into Georgetown County, and ends on a peninsula at the mouth of Murrells Inlet.

== Geography ==
Garden City is located in southern Horry County and is bordered to the northeast by the town of Surfside Beach, to the northwest by U.S. Route 17, to the south by the Georgetown County/Horry County line, and to the southeast by the Atlantic Ocean. U.S. Route 17 Business is the main road through the center of the community, leading northeast 10 miles (16 km) to the center of Myrtle Beach. Georgetown is 25 miles (40 km) to the southwest via US 17.

According to the United States Census Bureau, the Garden City CDP has a total area of 5.4 square miles (14.1 km^{2}), of which 5.4 square miles (13.9 km^{2}) are land and 0.1 square miles (0.2 km^{2}), or 1.47%, are water.

== Demographics ==
Historical population
Census	Pop.	Note	%±
2000	9,357		—
2010	9,209		−1.6%
2020	10,235		11.1%
U.S. Decennial Census

=== 2020 census ===
As of the 2020 census, Garden City had a population of 10,235. The median age was 61.5 years. 10.0% of residents were under the age of 18 and 42.4% of residents were 65 years of age or older. For every 100 females there were 84.2 males, and for every 100 females age 18 and over there were 81.6 males age 18 and over.

100.0% of residents lived in urban areas, while 0.0% lived in rural areas.

There were 5,272 households in Garden City, including 2,765 families, of which 12.3% had children under the age of 18 living in them. Of all households, 41.9% were married-couple households, 18.0% were households with a male householder and no spouse or partner present, and 33.3% were households with a female householder and no spouse or partner present. About 37.5% of all households were made up of individuals and 23.5% had someone living alone who was 65 years of age or older.

There were 10,110 housing units, of which 47.9% were vacant. The homeowner vacancy rate was 2.2% and the rental vacancy rate was 31.7%.

Garden City racial composition
Race	Num.	Perc.
White (non-Hispanic)	9,366	91.51%
Black or African American (non-Hispanic)	147	1.44%
Native American	16	0.16%
Asian	41	0.4%
Pacific Islander	13	0.13%
Other/Mixed	365	3.57%
Hispanic or Latino	287	2.8%

=== 2000 census ===
As of the census of 2000, there were 9,357 people, 4,703 households, and 2,873 families residing in the CDP. The population density was 1,745.1 inhabitants per square mile (673.8/km^{2}). There were 7,995 housing units at an average density of 1,491.1 per square mile (575.7/km^{2}). The racial makeup of the CDP was 97.02% White, 1.00% African American, 0.28% Native American, 0.42% Asian, 0.10% Pacific Islander, 0.30% from other races, and 0.89% from two or more races. Hispanic or Latino of any race were 1.12% of the population.

There were 4,703 households, out of which 12.8% had children under the age of 18 living with them, 52.2% were married couples living together, 6.9% had a female householder with no husband present, and 38.9% were non-families. 31.9% of all households were made up of individuals, and 15.4% had someone living alone who was 65 years of age or older. The average household size was 1.96 and the average family size was 2.40.

In the CDP, the population was spread out, with 11.2% under the age of 18, 5.6% from 18 to 24, 21.5% from 25 to 44, 27.6% from 45 to 64, and 34.2% who were 65 years of age or older. The median age was 54 years. For every 100 females, there were 91.5 males. For every 100 females age 18 and over, there were 89.1 males.

The median income for a household in the CDP was $34,967, and the median income for a family was $40,403. Males had a median income of $27,683 versus $22,904 for females. The per capita income for the CDP was $24,062. About 2.9% of families and 5.5% of the population were below the poverty line, including 7.4% of those under age 18 and 3.5% of those age 65 or over.

== Attractions ==
=== The Pier at Garden City ===
Formally known as the Kingfisher Pier that was completely destroyed by Hurricane Hugo and replaced, It is approximately 668 feet (204 m) long, with a rain shelter at the end of the pier which includes a bar and nightly live music during the tourist season.

=== Garden City Golf Cart Parade ===
The Garden City Golf Cart Parade is a Fourth of July parade that features red, white and blue-decorated golf carts. It has been a community tradition for almost 30 years. It originally started at Calhoun Drive behind Willards Fireworks. After a brief hiatus, it was held again on July 4, 2009.

== Weather ==
Temperatures tend to be in the 80s (°F) during the summer months in Garden City, SC, and in the 40s during the winter. The warmest month of the year is July with an average maximum temperature of 90.40 °F (32.44 °C), while the coldest month of the year is January with an average minimum temperature of 37.30 °F (2.94 °C). The annual average precipitation at Garden City is 54.57 inches. Rainfall is fairly evenly distributed throughout the year. The wettest month of the year is September with an average rainfall of 6.44 inches.

=== Hurricane Hazel ===
The worst disaster in the community's history occurred on 14 October 1954. Hurricane Hazel slammed into the community and left only two houses habitable.

=== Hurricane Hugo ===
In September 1989, Hurricane Hugo destroyed 43% of the beachfront structures along the coast in Garden City. In the aftermath of the storm, Horry County administrator M. L. Love said, "Garden City for all practical purposes is gone." The Kingfisher Pier, as it was known at that time, was also destroyed by Hurricane Hugo. Reconstruction of the pier began in February 1992. The Pier at Garden City, as it is known today, was fully operational July 1992, and no significant damage has been reported since then.

== Transportation ==
=== Roads and highways ===
- U.S. 17 Business
- U.S. 17

=== Mass transit ===
- The Coast RTA - Bus system operating seven days a week, 364 days a year. 15 routes throughout the Horry County/Grand Strand area, including Myrtle Beach, North Myrtle Beach, Surfside Beach, Garden City, Conway, Loris, and Aynor.

== Education ==
Horry County School District is the sole school district in the county.
