= Horry County, South Carolina =

County in South Carolina, United States

- County
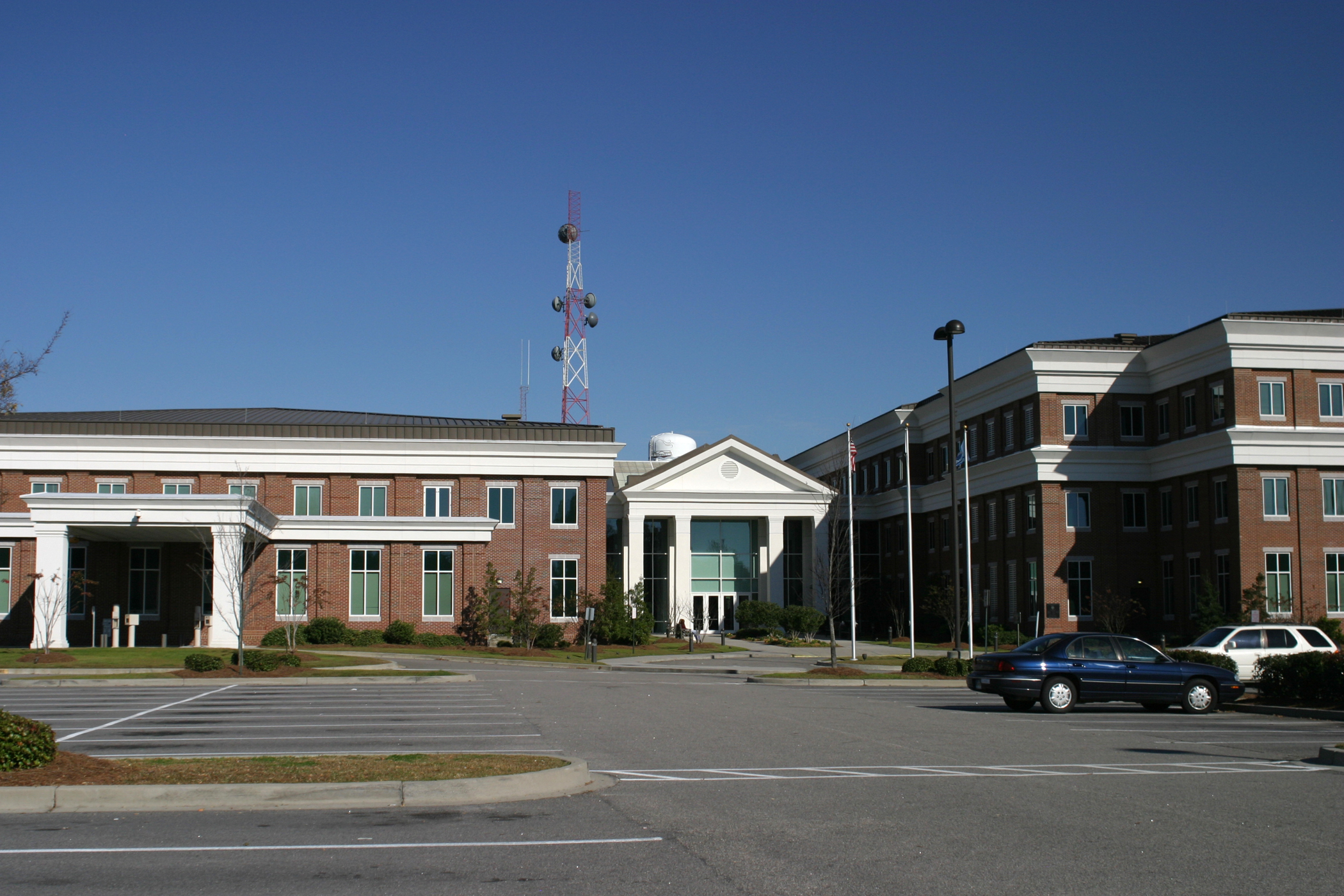
- Horry County Government and Justice Center

- Flag Seal Logo
- Nickname: The Independent Republic
- Motto: "Committed to Excellence"
- Location within the U.S. state of South Carolina
- Interactive map of Horry County, South Carolina
- Coordinates: 33.91°N 78.98°W
- Country: United States
- State: South Carolina
- Founded: 1801
- Named for: Peter Horry
- Seat: Conway
- Largest community: Myrtle Beach

Area
  - Total: 1,254.73 sq mi (3,249.7 km^{2})
  - Land: 1,133.31 sq mi (2,935.3 km^{2})
  - Water: 121.42 sq mi (314.5 km^{2}) 9.69%

Population (2020)
  - Total: 351,029
  - Estimate (2026): 443,425 ▲
  - Density: 309.738/sq mi (119.590/km^{2})
- Time zone: UTC−5 (Eastern)
  - Summer (DST): UTC−4 (EDT)
- ZIP Codes: 29511, 29526, 29527, 29528, 29544, 29545, 29566, 29567, 29568, 29569, 29572, 29575, 29576. 29577, 29578, 29579, 29581, 29582, 29587, 29588, 29597, 29598
- Area code: 843
- Congressional district: 7th
- Website: www.horrycountysc.gov

Horry County (/ˈɒriː/ OR-ree, silent "h" like its namesake Peter Horry) is the easternmost county in the U.S. state of South Carolina. As of the 2026 its population was 443,425. It is the fourth-most populous county in South Carolina. The county seat is Conway. Horry County is the central county in the Myrtle Beach-Conway-North Myrtle Beach, SC Metropolitan Statistical Area. It is in the Pee Dee region of South Carolina, about 90 miles (140 km) north of Charleston, and about 130 miles (210 km) east of the state capital, Columbia.

== History ==
Horry County was created from Georgetown District in 1801. At this time, the county had an estimated population of 550. Isolated by the many rivers and swamps typical of the South Carolina Lowcountry, the area essentially was surrounded by water, forcing its inhabitants to survive without much assistance from the "outside world". This caused the county residents to become an extremely independent populace, and they named their county "The Independent Republic of Horry". The county was named after, and in honor of, Revolutionary War hero Peter Horry who was born in South Carolina around 1743. Horry started his military career in 1775 as one of 20 captains, elected by the Provincial Congress of South Carolina, to serve the 1st and 2nd Regiments. In 1790, he was assigned to the South Carolina militia under Brigadier General Francis Marion.

The population has increased more than fourfold since 1970, as the area has become a destination for retirees and people owning second homes.

On October 29, 2012, the county paid homage to the man for whom the county is named. It commissioned a bronze sculpture of Peter Horry, installing it inside the Horry County Government and Justice Center. The sculpture was designed by artist Garland Weeks. Coastal Monument of Conway designed the stone base. The base of the sculpture is inscribed with the names of the 1801 commissioners on one side and the names of 2011 Horry County Council members on the other; a brief biography of General Peter Horry is on the front. It cost slightly more than $16,200 for both the bust/sculpture and the stone base.

== Geography ==
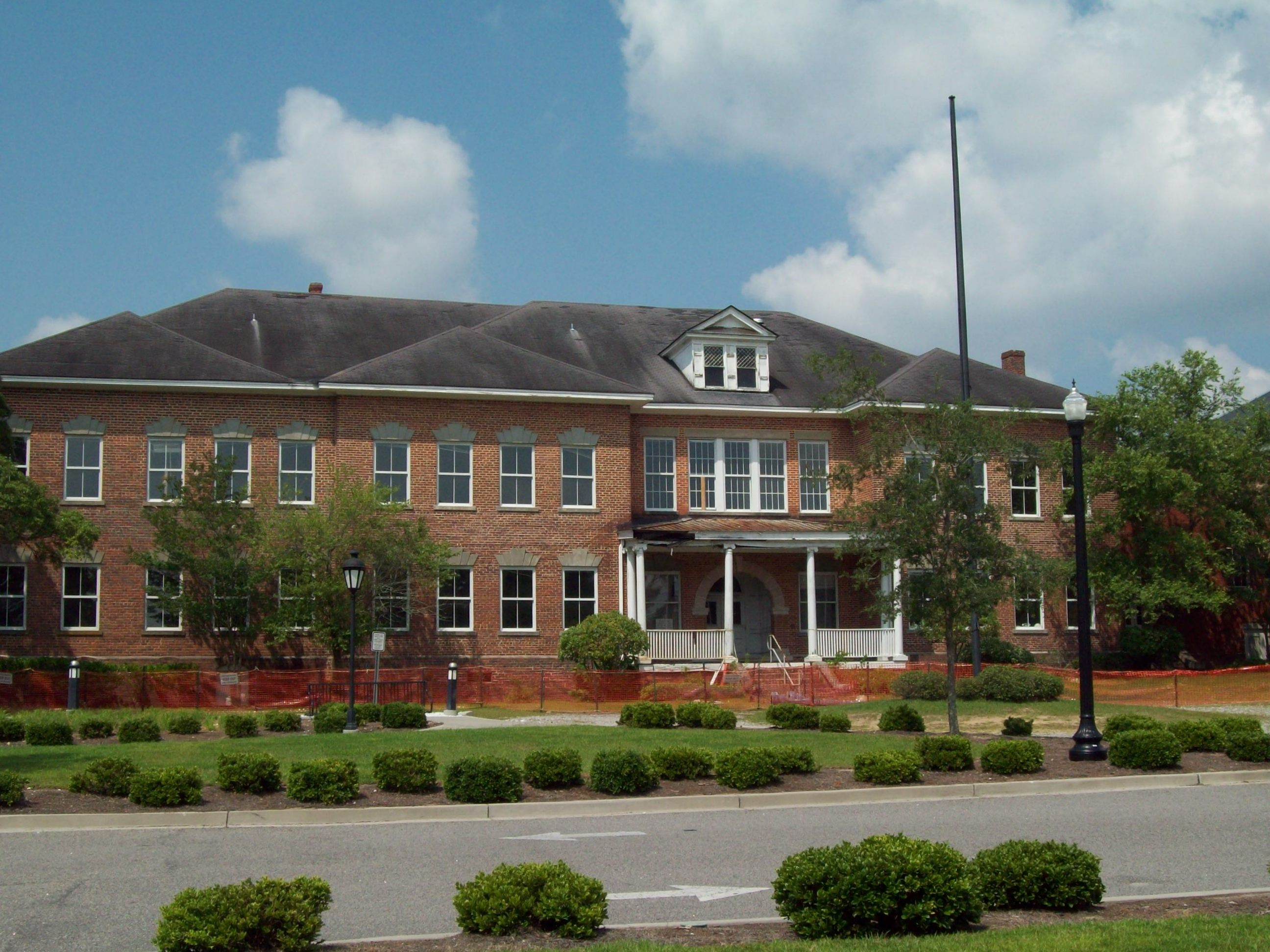
Horry County Museum in Conway

According to the U.S. Census Bureau, the county has a total area of 1,254.73 square miles (3,249.7 km^{2}), of which 1,133.31 square miles (2,935.3 km^{2}) is land and 121.42 square miles (314.5 km^{2}) (9.68%) is water. It is the largest county by land area in South Carolina. The highest point in the county is 124 feet (38 m) above sea level.

Horry County is in the northeastern corner of South Carolina. It is a diverse land made up of rivers, beaches, forests, and swamps, and is bordered by the Atlantic Ocean to the east, the Little Pee Dee River and Drowning Creek (also known as the Lumber River) on its western side, and North Carolina to the north. The Waccamaw River, around 140 miles (230 km) long, runs through southeastern North Carolina and eastern South Carolina into Horry County. The river runs through the coastal plain, along the eastern border between the two states, and into the Atlantic Ocean.

=== National protected area ===
- Waccamaw National Wildlife Refuge (part)

=== State and local protected areas/sites ===
- Cartwheel Bay Heritage Preserve/Wildlife Management Area
- Conway Post Office
- Heritage Shores Nature Preserve
- Horry County Museum
- Lewis Ocean Bay Heritage Preserve/Wildlife Management Area
- Myrtle Beach State Park
- North Myrtle Beach Area Historical Museum
- Russell Burgess Coastal Preserve
- Waccamaw River Heritage Preserve/Wildlife Management Area

=== Major water bodies ===
- Atlantic Ocean (North Atlantic Ocean)
- Calabash River
- Dunes Lake
- Great Pee Dee River
- Intracoastal Waterway
- Lake Busbee
- Little Pee Dee River
- Little River
- Long Bay
- Lumber River
- Murrells Inlet
- Tuckahoe Bay
- Waccamaw River

=== Adjacent counties ===
- Robeson County, North Carolina - northwest
- Columbus County, North Carolina – northeast
- Brunswick County, North Carolina – east
- Georgetown County – southwest
- Marion County – west
- Dillon County – northwest

== Demographics ==
Historical population
Census	Pop.	Note	%±
1810	4,349		—
1820	5,025		15.5%
1830	5,245		4.4%
1840	5,755		9.7%
1850	7,646		32.9%
1860	7,962		4.1%
1870	10,721		34.7%
1880	15,574		45.3%
1890	19,256		23.6%
1900	23,364		21.3%
1910	26,995		15.5%
1920	32,077		18.8%
1930	39,376		22.8%
1940	51,951		31.9%
1950	59,820		15.1%
1960	68,247		14.1%
1970	69,992		2.6%
1980	101,419		44.9%
1990	144,053		42.0%
2000	196,629		36.5%
2010	269,291		37.0%
2020	351,029		30.4%
2026 (est.)	443,524	▲	26.3%
U.S. Decennial Census; 1790–1960 1900–1990; 1990–2000 2010 2020

=== Racial and ethnic composition ===
Horry County, South Carolina – Racial and ethnic composition Note: the US Census treats Hispanic/Latino as an ethnic category. This table excludes Latinos from the racial categories and assigns them to a separate category. Hispanics/Latinos may be of any race.
Race / Ethnicity (NH = Non-Hispanic)	Pop 1980	Pop 1990	Pop 2000	Pop 2010	Pop 2020	% 1980	% 1990	% 2000	% 2010	% 2020
White alone (NH)	77,553	116,284	157,040	208,096	265,729	76.47%	80.72%	79.87%	77.28%	75.70%
Black or African American alone (NH)	22,075	25,052	30,206	35,753	39,367	21.77%	17.39%	15.36%	13.28%	11.21%
Native American or Alaska Native alone (NH)	115	330	742	1,075	1,174	0.11%	0.23%	0.38%	0.40%	0.33%
Asian alone (NH)	350	1,089	1,481	2,774	4,578	0.35%	0.76%	0.75%	1.03%	1.30%
Native Hawaiian or Pacific Islander alone (NH)	x	x	80	232	303	x	x	0.04%	0.09%	0.09%
Other race alone (NH)	188	39	189	395	1,422	0.19%	0.03%	0.10%	0.15%	0.41%
Mixed race or Multiracial (NH)	x	x	1,834	4,283	14,152	x	x	0.93%	1.59%	4.03%
Hispanic or Latino (any race)	1,138	1,259	5,057	16,683	24,304	1.12%	0.87%	2.57%	6.20%	6.92%
Total	101,419	144,053	196,629	269,291	351,029	100.00%	100.00%	100.00%	100.00%	100.00%

=== 2020 census ===
As of the 2020 census, the county had a population of 351,029 and 89,281 families. The median age was 49.0 years, with 17.4% of residents under the age of 18 and 26.8% 65 years of age or older; for every 100 females there were 92.9 males, and for every 100 females age 18 and over there were 90.5 males age 18 and over.

The racial makeup of the county was 77.1% White, 11.4% Black or African American, 0.5% American Indian and Alaska Native, 1.3% Asian, 0.1% Native Hawaiian and Pacific Islander, 3.5% from some other race, and 6.1% from two or more races. Hispanic or Latino residents of any race comprised 6.9% of the population.

75.6% of residents lived in urban areas, while 24.4% lived in rural areas.

There were 150,221 households in the county, of which 22.5% had children under the age of 18 living with them and 27.3% had a female householder with no spouse or partner present. About 28.0% of all households were made up of individuals and 13.8% had someone living alone who was 65 years of age or older.

There were 203,702 housing units, of which 26.3% were vacant. Among occupied housing units, 73.9% were owner-occupied and 26.1% were renter-occupied. The homeowner vacancy rate was 2.3% and the rental vacancy rate was 18.2%.

=== 2010 census ===
At the 2010 census, 269,291 people, 112,225 households, and 72,254 families resided in the county. The population density was 237.5 inhabitants per square mile (91.7/km^{2}). The 185,992 housing units averaged 164.0 per square mile (63.3/km^{2}). The racial makeup of the county was 79.9% White, 13.4% Black or African American, 1.0% Asian, 0.5% American Indian, 0.1% Pacific Islander, 3.1% from other races, and 2.0% from two or more races. Those of Hispanic or Latino origin made up 6.2% of the population. In terms of ancestry, 15.3% were American, 13.4% were African American (which can include other ethnicities), 13.3% were Irish, 12.8% were German, 11.3% were English, and 6.1% were Italian.

Of the 112,225 households, 27.3% had children under 18 living with them, 47.2% were married couples living together, 12.5% had a female householder with no husband present, 35.6% were not families, and 26.8% of all households were made up of individuals. The average household size was 2.37, and the average family size was 2.84. The median age was 41.1 years.

The median income for a household in the county was $43,142 and for a family was $51,608. Males had a median income of $37,351 versus $29,525 for females. The per capita income for the county was $24,811. About 11.6% of families and 16.1% of the population were below the poverty line, including 25.2% of those under age 18 and 7.5% of those age 65 or over.

== Law, government, and politics ==
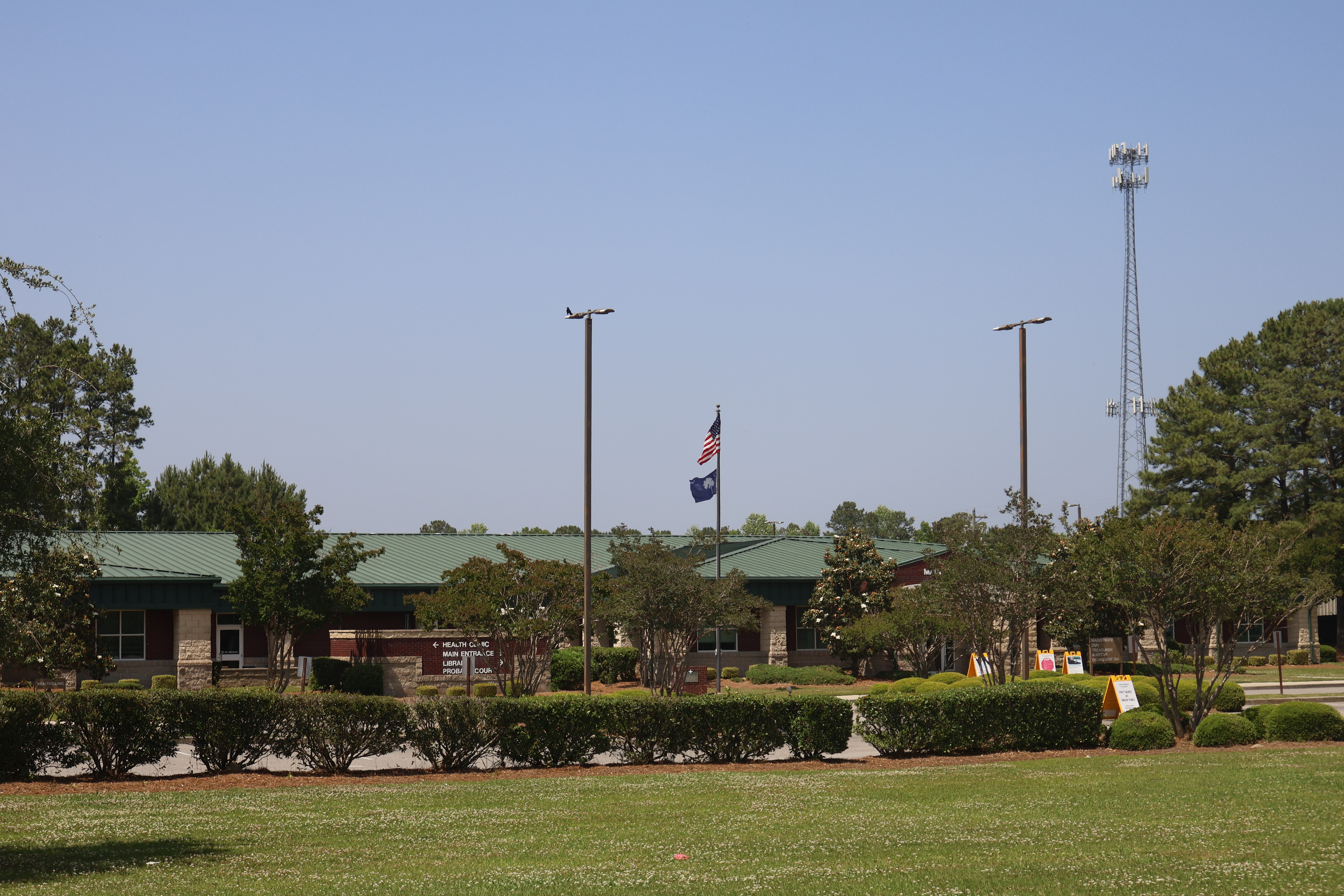
Horry County Ralph Ellis Complex near Little River

=== State delegation ===
Horry County has a South Carolina House of Representatives delegation made up of 10 state representatives. In addition, the county has a South Carolina Senate delegation made up of five state senators. The delegations work concurrently to represent county issues in Columbia.

==== State House of Representatives delegation ====
The county's State House of Representatives delegation is currently made up of:

District	Representative	Party	Residence
55	Jackie E. Hayes	Dem	Dillon
56	Tim McGinnis	Rep	Myrtle Beach
57	Lucas Atkinson	Dem	Marion
58	Jeff Johnson	Rep	Conway
68	Heather Ammons Crawford	Rep	Myrtle Beach
103	Carl Anderson	Dem	Georgetown
104	William Bailey	Rep	North Myrtle Beach
105	Kevin Hardee	Rep	Loris
106	Val Guest, Jr.	Rep	Myrtle Beach
107	Case Brittain	Rep	Myrtle Beach

==== State Senate delegation ====
The county's State Senate delegation is currently made up of:

District	Representative	Party	Residence
28	Greg Hembree	Republican	North Myrtle Beach
30	Kent M. Williams	Democratic	Marion
32	Ronnie A. Sabb	Democratic	Greeleyville
33	Luke A. Rankin	Republican	Conway
34	Stephen Goldfinch	Republican	Murrells Inlet

=== County council ===
The county council of Horry County consists of members who represent 11 single-member districts with a chairman voted at-large. The county council meets at the Horry County Government and Justice Center in the first week of every month. Patricia S. Hartley is the clerk to council, members of the county council include:

==== Current county council members ====
Name	District	Term Expires
Johnny Gardner	Chairman	December 31, 2026
Jenna L. Dukes	1	December 31, 2026
Bill Howard	2	December 31, 2026
Dennis J. DiSabato, Jr.	3	December 31, 2024
Gary Loftus	4	December 31, 2024
Tyler Servant	5	December 31, 2026
Cam Crawford	6	December 31, 2024
Tom Anderson	7	December 31, 2026
Michael Masciarelli	8	December 31, 2026
R. Mark Causey	9	December 31, 2024
Danny Hardee	10	December 31, 2024
Al Allen	11	December 31, 2022

==== Past composition of the county council ====
Period	Year	Chairman (at-large)	District 1	District 2	District 3	District 4	District 5	District 6	District 7	District 8	District 9	District 10	District 11
Past	2007	Liz Gilland	Harold Worley	Unknown	Unknown	Unknown	Unknown	Unknown	Unknown	Unknown	Unknown	Unknown	Al Allen
Past	2008	Liz Gilland	Harold Worley	Unknown	Unknown	Unknown	Unknown	Unknown	Unknown	Unknown	Unknown	Unknown	Al Allen
Past	2009	Liz Gilland	Harold Worley	Unknown	Marion Foxworth	Gary Loftus	Unknown	Unknown	Unknown	Unknown	W. Paul Prince	Jody Prince	Al Allen
Past	2010	Liz Gilland	Harold Worley	Unknown	Marion Foxworth	Gary Loftus	Unknown	Unknown	Unknown	Unknown	W. Paul Prince	Jody Prince	Al Allen
Past	2011	Tom Rice	Harold Worley	Brent Schulz	Marion Foxworth	Gary Loftus	Paul Price	Unknown	Carl Schwartzkopf	James Frazier	W. Paul Prince	Jody Prince	Al Allen
Past	2012	Tom Rice	Harold Worley	Brent Schulz	Marion Foxworth	Gary Loftus	Paul Price	Unknown	Carl Schwartzkopf	James Frazier	W. Paul Prince	Jody Prince	Al Allen
Past	2013	Tom Rice	Harold Worley	Brent Schulz	Marion Foxworth	Gary Loftus	Paul Price	Bob Grabowski*	Carl Schwartzkopf	James Frazier	W. Paul Prince	Jody Prince	Al Allen
Past	2014	Tom Rice	Harold Worley	Brent Schulz	Marion Foxworth	Gary Loftus	Paul Price	Bob Grabowski*	Carl Schwartzkopf	James Frazier	W. Paul Prince	Jody Prince	Al Allen
Past	2015	Mark Lazarus	Harold Worley	Bill Howard	Marion Foxworth	Gary Loftus	Tyler Servant	James Frazier	Johnny Vaught	Bob Grabowski*	W. Paul Prince	Jody Prince	Al Allen
Past	2016	Mark Lazarus	Harold Worley	Bill Howard	Marion Foxworth	Gary Loftus	Tyler Servant	James Frazier	Johnny Vaught	Bob Grabowski*	W. Paul Prince	Jody Prince	Al Allen
Past	2017	Mark Lazarus	Harold Worley	Bill Howard	Dennis DiSabato	Gary Loftus	Tyler Servant	James Frazier	Johnny Vaught	Cam Crawford	W. Paul Prince	Danny Hardee	Al Allen
Past	2018	Mark Lazarus	Harold Worley	Bill Howard	Dennis DiSabato	Gary Loftus	Tyler Servant	James Frazier	Johnny Vaught	Cam Crawford	W. Paul Prince	Danny Hardee	Al Allen
Past	2019	Johnny Gardner	Harold Worley	Bill Howard	Dennis DiSabato	Gary Loftus	Tyler Servant	Orton Bellamy	Johnny Vaught	Cam Crawford	W. Paul Prince	Danny Hardee	Al Allen
Past	2020	Johnny Gardner	Harold Worley	Bill Howard	Dennis DiSabato	Gary Loftus	Tyler Servant	Orton Bellamy	Johnny Vaught	Cam Crawford	W. Paul Prince	Danny Hardee	Al Allen
Current	2021	Johnny Gardner	Harold Worley	Bill Howard	Dennis DiSabato	Gary Loftus	Tyler Servant	Orton Bellamy	Johnny Vaught	Cam Crawford	R. Mark Causey	Danny Hardee	Al Allen
Current	2022	Johnny Gardner	Harold Worley	Bill Howard	Dennis DiSabato	Gary Loftus	Tyler Servant	Orton Bellamy	Johnny Vaught	Cam Crawford	R. Mark Causey	Danny Hardee	Al Allen
* Note: Bob Grabowski's seat was renumbered from District 6 to District 8 during the redistricting of council seats.

=== Law enforcement ===
The Horry County Police Department provides 24-hour services to the unincorporated areas of the county. It is the only county police department in South Carolina. The Horry County Sheriff's Office is responsible for courthouse security, processing of warrants, fingerprinting, registration of sex offenders, funeral escorts, background checks, and managing the J. Reuben Long Detention Center. The South Carolina Highway Patrol has a Troop 5 barracks in Conway, and provides services throughout the county. Myrtle Beach, Conway, Briarcliffe Acres, Atlantic Beach, Surfside Beach, Loris, and Aynor all have their own police departments, which patrol within the relevant town or city's border. North Myrtle Beach has a Public Safety Department, which provides police and fire services in the city of North Myrtle Beach.

In March 2020, Todd Cox, a former Horry County police officer, was fined $300 for failing to investigate reports of sex crimes against children. He and three other officers had been indicted in 2016 on charges of coercing sex and ignoring cases.

=== Party strength ===
United States presidential election results for Horry County, South Carolina
Year	Republican		Democratic		Third party(ies)	
Year	No.	%	No.	%	No.	%
1896	196	12.50%	1,372	87.50%	0	0.00%
1900	79	5.61%	1,330	94.39%	0	0.00%
1904	40	3.92%	980	96.08%	0	0.00%
1908	56	4.30%	1,247	95.70%	0	0.00%
1912	13	1.47%	863	97.73%	7	0.79%
1916	0	0.00%	1,638	99.57%	7	0.43%
1920	49	2.79%	1,709	97.21%	0	0.00%
1924	1	0.07%	1,346	99.70%	3	0.22%
1928	27	2.16%	1,224	97.84%	0	0.00%
1932	29	0.89%	3,224	99.11%	0	0.00%
1936	0	0.00%	2,927	100.00%	0	0.00%
1940	164	7.21%	2,111	92.79%	0	0.00%
1944	137	5.02%	2,403	88.09%	188	6.89%
1948	113	2.85%	503	12.70%	3,345	84.45%
1952	3,716	45.29%	4,489	54.71%	0	0.00%
1956	1,092	13.36%	4,835	59.17%	2,244	27.46%
1960	3,768	38.55%	6,006	61.45%	0	0.00%
1964	8,293	60.37%	5,444	39.63%	0	0.00%
1968	3,924	26.97%	3,924	26.97%	6,701	46.06%
1972	15,324	76.84%	4,437	22.25%	183	0.92%
1976	9,339	37.18%	15,720	62.59%	58	0.23%
1980	14,323	49.62%	13,888	48.12%	653	2.26%
1984	20,396	69.23%	8,940	30.34%	127	0.43%
1988	24,843	64.68%	13,316	34.67%	250	0.65%
1992	23,489	45.87%	18,896	36.90%	8,819	17.22%
1996	26,159	47.86%	23,722	43.40%	4,772	8.73%
2000	40,300	56.55%	29,113	40.85%	1,852	2.60%
2004	50,447	62.01%	29,547	36.32%	1,353	1.66%
2008	64,609	61.65%	38,879	37.10%	1,310	1.25%
2012	72,127	64.17%	38,885	34.60%	1,381	1.23%
2016	89,288	67.17%	39,410	29.65%	4,222	3.18%
2020	118,821	66.11%	59,180	32.92%	1,743	0.97%
2024	141,719	68.81%	62,325	30.26%	1,910	0.93%

Horry County used to be loyally Democratic, even by the standards of the Solid South. In 1936, Republican candidate Alf Landon did not receive a single vote in Horry County. In 1964, though, Barry Goldwater carried the county by a margin almost as large as John F. Kennedy's 1960 margin. It has voted Republican in every election since, with the exception of supporting the third-party candidacy of Alabama Governor George Wallace in 1968 and neighboring Georgia's Jimmy Carter in 1976. While conservative Democrats continued to hold most local offices into the 1990s, today, there are almost no elected Democrats left above the county level. No Democratic presidential candidate has received more than 40% of the county's vote since 2000. Like Greenville County, it is exceptionally conservative for an urban county.

== Economy ==
In 2022, the GDP was $18.3 billion (about $45,922 per capita), and the real GDP was $15.3 billion (about $38,472 per capita) in chained 2017 dollars.

In 2013, PTR Industries, a gunmaker, relocated to the Cool Springs Business Park near Aynor from Bristol, Connecticut. That state had passed restrictive gun control legislation following the Sandy Hook Elementary School shooting.

Twenty-one PTR employees relocated from Bristol. The company stated that it would hire an additional 30 workers in the first quarter of 2014, with a goal of having 120 employees by 2017.

As of April 2024, some of the largest employers in the county include Adidas, the city of Myrtle Beach, Coastal Carolina University, Food Lion, Hilton Grand Vacations, Publix, and Walmart.

Employment and Wage Statistics by Industry in Horry County, South Carolina - Q3 2023
Industry	Employment Counts	Employment Percentage (%)	Average Annual Wage ($)
Accommodation and Food Services	34,736	23.7	29,588
Administrative and Support and Waste Management and Remediation Services	8,498	5.8	42,744
Agriculture, Forestry, Fishing and Hunting	211	0.1	49,608
Arts, Entertainment, and Recreation	5,831	4.0	26,260
Construction	8,791	6.0	59,644
Educational Services	8,771	6.0	59,592
Finance and Insurance	3,203	2.2	77,532
Health Care and Social Assistance	17,448	11.9	62,556
Information	1,813	1.2	65,468
Management of Companies and Enterprises	515	0.4	79,300
Manufacturing	3,534	2.4	52,208
Mining, Quarrying, and Oil and Gas Extraction	69	0.0	74,204
Other Services (except Public Administration)	3,713	2.5	37,492
Professional, Scientific, and Technical Services	4,815	3.3	68,796
Public Administration	6,859	4.7	56,836
Real Estate and Rental and Leasing	4,787	3.3	44,356
Retail Trade	26,720	18.2	35,152
Transportation and Warehousing	3,141	2.1	48,568
Utilities	629	0.4	73,892
Wholesale Trade	2,730	1.9	61,308
Total	146,814	100.0%	45,424

== Transportation ==
=== Major highways ===
- Future I-73
- Future I-74
- US 17
- US 17 Bus.
- US 17 Conn.
- US 76
- US 378
- US 378 Truck
- US 501
- US 501 Bus.
- US 701
- US 701 Truck (Conway 1)
- US 701 Truck (Conway 2)
- SC 9
- SC 9 Bus.
- SC 22
- SC 31
- SC 31 Conn.
- SC 65
- SC 90
- SC 90 Conn.
- SC 179
- SC 319
- SC 410
- SC 544
- SC 544 Conn. (Red Hill 1)
- SC 544 Conn. (Red Hill 2)
- SC 707
- SC 905
- SC 917

=== Airports ===
- Conway–Horry County Airport (HYW) - Conway
- Grand Strand Airport (CRE) - North Myrtle Beach
- Green Sea Airport (S79) - Green Sea
- Myrtle Beach International Airport (MYR) - Myrtle Beach
- Twin City Airport (5J9) - Loris

=== Mass transit ===
- The Coast RTA bus system operates seven days a week, 364 days a year, on 15 routes throughout the Horry County/Grand Strand area, including Myrtle Beach, North Myrtle Beach, Surfside Beach, Garden City, Conway, Loris, and Aynor.

== Communities ==
=== Cities ===
- Conway (county seat)
- Loris
- Myrtle Beach (largest community)
- North Myrtle Beach

=== Towns ===
- Atlantic Beach
- Aynor
- Briarcliffe Acres
- Surfside Beach

=== Census-designated places ===
- Bucksport
- Carolina Forest
- Finklea
- Forestbrook
- Garden City
- Green Sea
- Homewood
- Ketchuptown
- Little River
- Live Oak
- Red Hill
- Socastee

=== Unincorporated communities & neighborhoods ===
- Adrian
- Allsbrook
- Baxter Forks
- Bayboro
- Brooksville
- Bucksville
- Buck Forest
- Burgess
- Causey
- Cedar Branch
- Cherry Grove Beach
- Chestnut Hill
- Cochran Town
- Cool Spring
- Crescent Beach
- Daisy
- Dog Bluff
- Dongola
- Duford
- Fantasy Harbour
- Floyds Crossroads
- Forney
- Galivants Ferry
- Glass Hill
- Goretown
- Gurley
- Hand
- Hammond
- Hickory Grove
- Horry
- Howard
- Ingram Beach
- Jordanville
- Klondike
- Konig
- Little Town
- Longs
- Mt. Calvary
- Mt. Olive
- Nixonville
- Nixons Crossroads
- Ocean Drive Beach
- Pee Dee Crossroads
- Pine Island
- Playcards
- Poplar
- Red Bluff
- Stephens Crossroads
- Shell
- Springmaid Beach
- Toddville
- Twelvemile
- Wampee
- Windy Hill Beach
- Worthams Ferry

== Education ==
Horry County School District is the sole school district in the county.

== See also ==
- List of counties in South Carolina
- National Register of Historic Places listings in Horry County, South Carolina
- Horry County Schools
- Waccamaw Indian People, state-recognized tribe that resides in the county
- 2023 Chinese balloon incident, high-altitude balloon shot down over the Atlantic Ocean, east of the county
- Myrtle Beach Speedway
