= National Register of Historic Places listings in Horry County, South Carolina =

Location of Horry County in South Carolina

This is a list of the National Register of Historic Places listings in Horry County, South Carolina.

This is intended to be a complete list of the properties and districts on the National Register of Historic Places in Horry County, South Carolina, United States. The locations of National Register properties and districts for which the latitude and longitude coordinates are included below, may be seen in a map.

There are 35 properties and districts listed on the National Register in the county, and 3 former listings.

This National Park Service list is complete through NPS recent listings posted July 4, 2026.

== Current listings ==
	Name on the Register	Image	Date listed	Location	City or town	Description
1	H.W. Ambrose House	H.W. Ambrose House	August 5, 1986 (#86002219)	1503 Elm Street; 33°50′47″N 79°03′32″W	Conway	
2	Atlantic Beach Historic District		January 22, 2025 (#100011324)	Generally bounded by Wiley Drive, 29th Avenue S, 32nd Avenue S, and the Atlantic Ocean; 33°48′09″N 78°43′01″W	Atlantic Beach	
3	Atlantic Coast Line Railroad Depot	Atlantic Coast Line Railroad Depot	May 18, 1995 (#86003839)	Northern side of U.S. Route 701; 33°50′17″N 79°02′36″W	Conway	
4	Beaty-Little House	Beaty-Little House	August 5, 1986 (#86002220)	507 Main Street; 33°50′18″N 79°02′56″W	Conway	
5	Beaty-Spivey House	Beaty-Spivey House	August 5, 1986 (#86002223)	428 Kingston Street; 33°50′15″N 79°02′47″W	Conway	
6	Buck's Upper Mill Farm	Buck's Upper Mill Farm	March 25, 1982 (#82003868)	North of Bucksville; 33°44′19″N 79°03′48″W	Bucksville	
7	Burroughs School	Burroughs School	August 2, 1984 (#84002047)	801 Main Street; 33°50′30″N 79°03′07″W	Conway	
8	Arthur M. Burroughs House	Arthur M. Burroughs House	August 5, 1986 (#86002224)	500 Lakeside Drive; 33°50′27″N 79°02′50″W	Conway	
9	Conway Downtown Historic District	Conway Downtown Historic District	August 19, 1994 (#94000815)	Roughly bounded by 4th Avenue, Kingston Street, 3rd Avenue, and Laurel Street; also portions of Main St, 3rd Ave, 4th Ave, Laurel St. Also portions of Elm St., Fourth Ave, Kingston St., Laurel St., Main St., Norman Alley, and Third Ave. 33°50′10″N 79°02′51″W	Conway	Second and third sets of addresses represent boundary increases approved March 31, 2010 and May 5, 2025.
10	Conway Methodist Church, 1898 and 1910 Sanctuaries	Conway Methodist Church, 1898 and 1910 Sanctuaries	August 5, 1986 (#86002225)	5th Avenue; 33°50′12″N 79°02′53″W	Conway	
11	Conway Post Office	Conway Post Office	September 2, 2009 (#08000758)	428 Main Street; 33°50′15″N 79°02′51″W	Conway	
12	Conway Residential Historic District	Conway Residential Historic District	April 7, 2010 (#10000166)	Main St. on the east, Fifth Ave to the south; Beaty and Burroughs Sts. to the west, and Ninth and Tenth Aves. to the north 33°50′22″N 79°03′07″W	Conway	
13	John P. Derham House	John P. Derham House	October 4, 2005 (#05001154)	1076 Green Sea Road; 34°07′26″N 78°58′34″W	Green Sea	
14	Galivants Ferry Historic District	Galivants Ferry Historic District	March 29, 2001 (#01000321)	Junction of U.S. Route 501, Pee Dee Road, and Galivants Ferry Road; 34°03′00″N 79°14′42″W	Galivants Ferry	
15	Hebron Church	Hebron Church	May 16, 1977 (#77001227)	10 miles (16 km) south of Conway off of U.S. Route 701; 33°42′57″N 79°04′03″W	Bucksville	
16	J.W. Holliday Jr. House	J.W. Holliday Jr. House	August 5, 1986 (#86002227)	701 Laurel Street; 33°50′22″N 79°03′04″W	Conway	
17	Horry County Courthouse	Horry County Courthouse	May 27, 2022 (#100007748)	1201 3rd Ave. 33°50′01″N 79°02′55″W	Conway	
18	Kingston Presbyterian Church	Kingston Presbyterian Church	September 28, 2009 (#08000759)	800 3rd Avenue; 33°50′10″N 79°02′43″W	Conway	
19	Kingston Presbyterian Church Cemetery	Kingston Presbyterian Church Cemetery	August 5, 1986 (#86002229)	800 3rd Avenue; 33°50′10″N 79°02′43″W	Conway	
20	Myrtle Beach Atlantic Coast Line Railroad Station	Myrtle Beach Atlantic Coast Line Railroad Station	July 22, 2002 (#96001212)	Junction of Oak Street and Broadway between Jackson Street and 8th Avenue; 33°41′41″N 78°53′08″W	Myrtle Beach	
21	Myrtle Beach Downtown Historic District		October 18, 2019 (#100004533)	Portions of Main St., 8th Ave. N., 9th Ave. N., N. Kings Hwy., Broadway St., N. Oak St. 33°41′36″N 78°53′00″W	Myrtle Beach	
22	Myrtle Heights-Oak Park Historic District	Myrtle Heights-Oak Park Historic District	October 28, 1998 (#96001217)	Roughly N. Ocean Boulevard between 32nd Avenue, N. and 46th Avenue, N. 33°42′52″N 78°51′14″W	Myrtle Beach	
23	Ocean Forest Country Club	Ocean Forest Country Club	November 7, 1996 (#96001219)	5609 Woodside Drive; 33°43′47″N 78°50′36″W	Myrtle Beach	
24	Old Horry County Courthouse	Old Horry County Courthouse	April 7, 1971 (#71000785)	Main Street; 33°50′06″N 79°02′45″W	Conway	
25	Pleasant Inn	Pleasant Inn	November 7, 1996 (#96001220)	200 Broadway; 33°41′16″N 78°53′39″W	Myrtle Beach	
26	C.P. Quattlebaum House	C.P. Quattlebaum House	August 5, 1986 (#86002233)	219 Kingston Street; 33°50′06″N 79°02′42″W	Conway	
27	C.P. Quattlebaum Office	C.P. Quattlebaum Office	August 5, 1986 (#86002235)	903 3rd Avenue; 33°50′07″N 79°02′44″W	Conway	
28	Paul Quattlebaum House	Paul Quattlebaum House	August 5, 1986 (#86002231)	225 Kingston Street; 33°50′06″N 79°02′43″W	Conway	
29	Socastee Historic District	Socastee Historic District	May 22, 2002 (#02000558)	South Carolina Highway 544, .5 miles (0.80 km) north of the Intracoastal Waterway; 33°59′11″N 78°59′57″W	Socastee	
30	Sun Fun Motel		March 12, 2020 (#100005046)	2305 Withers Dr. 33°42′12″N 78°52′08″W	Myrtle Beach	
31	Tawana Motel		May 13, 2019 (#100003918)	7501 N. Ocean Blvd. 33°44′38″N 78°49′01″W	Myrtle Beach	
32	Waccamaw River Memorial Bridge	Waccamaw River Memorial Bridge	August 26, 1994 (#94000994)	Main Street (U.S. Route 501 Business) over the Waccamaw River; 33°49′59″N 79°02′39″W	Conway	
33	Waccamaw River Warehouse Historic District	Waccamaw River Warehouse Historic District	August 5, 1986 (#86002269)	Roughly Main Street between the Waccamaw River and Laurel Street; 33°50′00″N 79°02′42″W	Conway	
34	Waikiki Village Motel	Waikiki Village Motel	June 12, 2017 (#100001076)	1500 S. Ocean Blvd. 33°40′26″N 78°54′04″W	Myrtle Beach	
35	W. H. Winborne House	W. H. Winborne House	August 5, 1986 (#86002268)	1300 6th Avenue; 33°50′11″N 79°03′07″W	Conway	

== Former listing ==
	Name on the Register	Image	Date listed	Date removed	Location	City or town	Description
1	Chesterfield Inn	Chesterfield Inn	November 7, 1996 (#96001218)	October 23, 2013	700 N. Ocean Boulevard; 33°41′23″N 78°52′54″W	Myrtle Beach	Demolished on August 22, 2012.
2	Noel Court and Apartments		January 7, 2021 (#100005988)	March 21, 2025	312 6th Ave. North	Myrtle Beach	
3	Rainbow Court	Rainbow Court	November 7, 1996 (#96001221)	February 27, 2020	405 Flagg Street; 33°41′09″N 78°53′12″W	Myrtle Beach	

== See also ==
- List of National Historic Landmarks in South Carolina
- National Register of Historic Places listings in South Carolina
