= Conway Residential Historic District =

Historic district in South Carolina, United States

- U.S. National Register of Historic Places
- U.S. Historic district
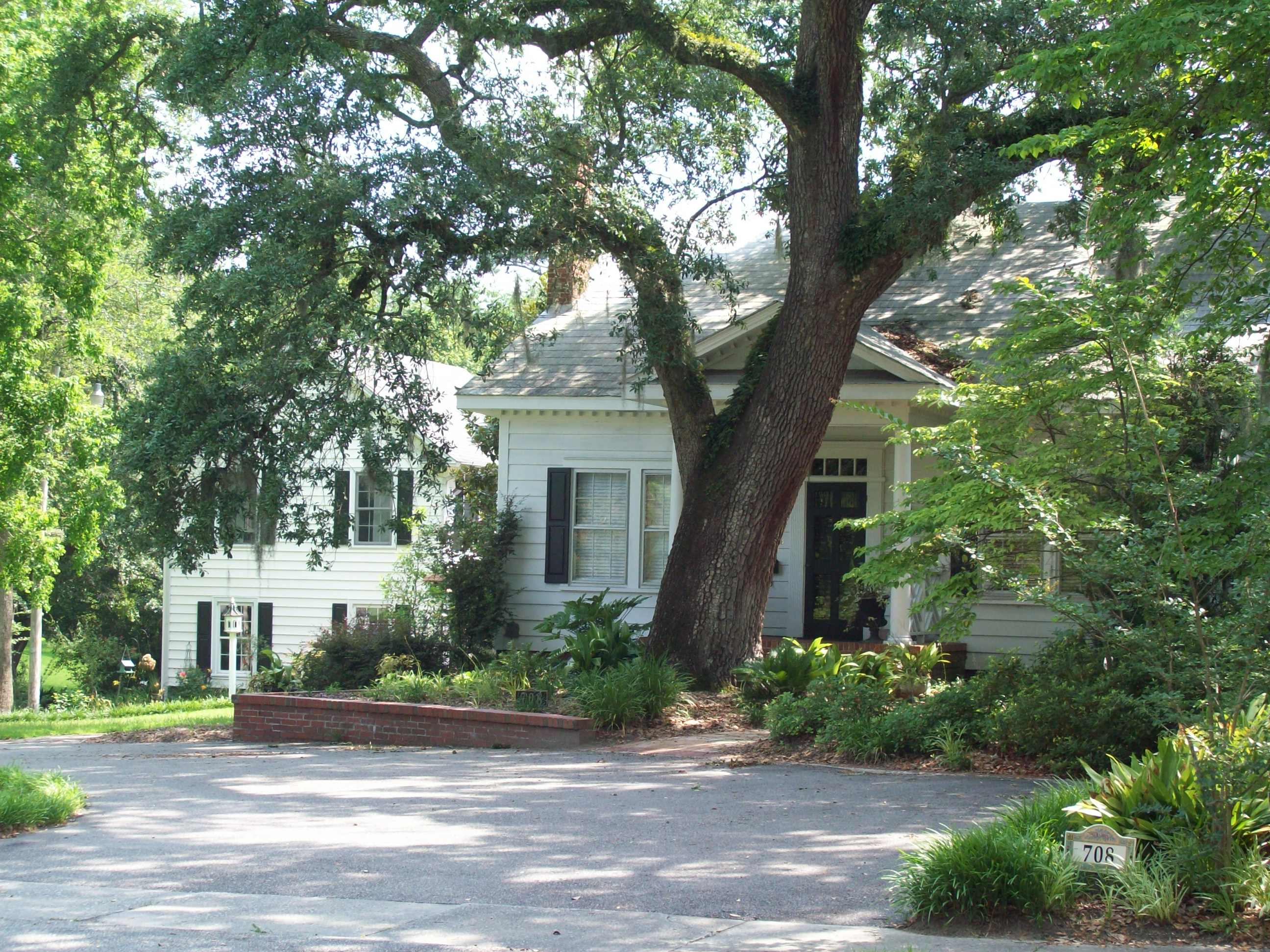
- Conway Residential Historic District, June 2010

- Location within South Carolina Location within the United States
- Location: Main St. on the east, Fifth Ave to the south; Beaty and Burroughs Sts. to the west, and Ninth and Tenth Aves. to the north, Conway, South Carolina
- Coordinates: 33°50′21.7″N 79°3′6.7″W
- Area: 85.79 acres (34.72 ha)
- MPS: Conway MRA
- NRHP reference No.: 10000166
- Added to NRHP: April 7, 2010

Conway Residential Historic District is a national historic district located at Conway in Horry County, South Carolina. It encompasses 125 contributing buildings and one contributing object. It includes a variety of quality 19th and 20th-century residential buildings, until about 1955. The residential buildings reflect a variety of popular architectural styles including Greek Revival, Carpenter Gothic Revival, Queen Anne, Italianate, and Tudor and Colonial Revival. The District also contains four apartment buildings, one school, a church, and a Confederate monument. Four properties in this historic district were previously listed: the Beaty-Little House, the Burroughs School, the J.W. Holliday Jr. House, and the W. H. Winborne House.

It was listed on the National Register of Historic Places in 2010.
