= Kingston Presbyterian Church =

Kingston Presbyterian Church can refer to

- Kingston Presbyterian Church (Kingston, New Jersey), a church in Kingston, New Jersey
- Kingston Presbyterian Church (Conway, South Carolina). a NRHP in South Carolina
