= Quattlebaum =

Quattlebaum is a surname. Notable people with the surname include:

- A. Marvin Quattlebaum Jr., United States federal judge
- Cephas Perry Quattlebaum
  - C.P. Quattlebaum Office, a historic law office building located at Conway in Horry County, South Carolina
  - C.P. Quattlebaum House, a historic home located at Conway in Horry County, South Carolina
  - Paul Quattlebaum House, a historic home located at Conway in Horry County, South Carolina
- Doug Quattlebaum (1929–1996), American blues guitarist, singer and songwriter
- Robert Quattlebaum, a developer of animation software
