= Waikiki Village Motel =

- U.S. National Register of Historic Places
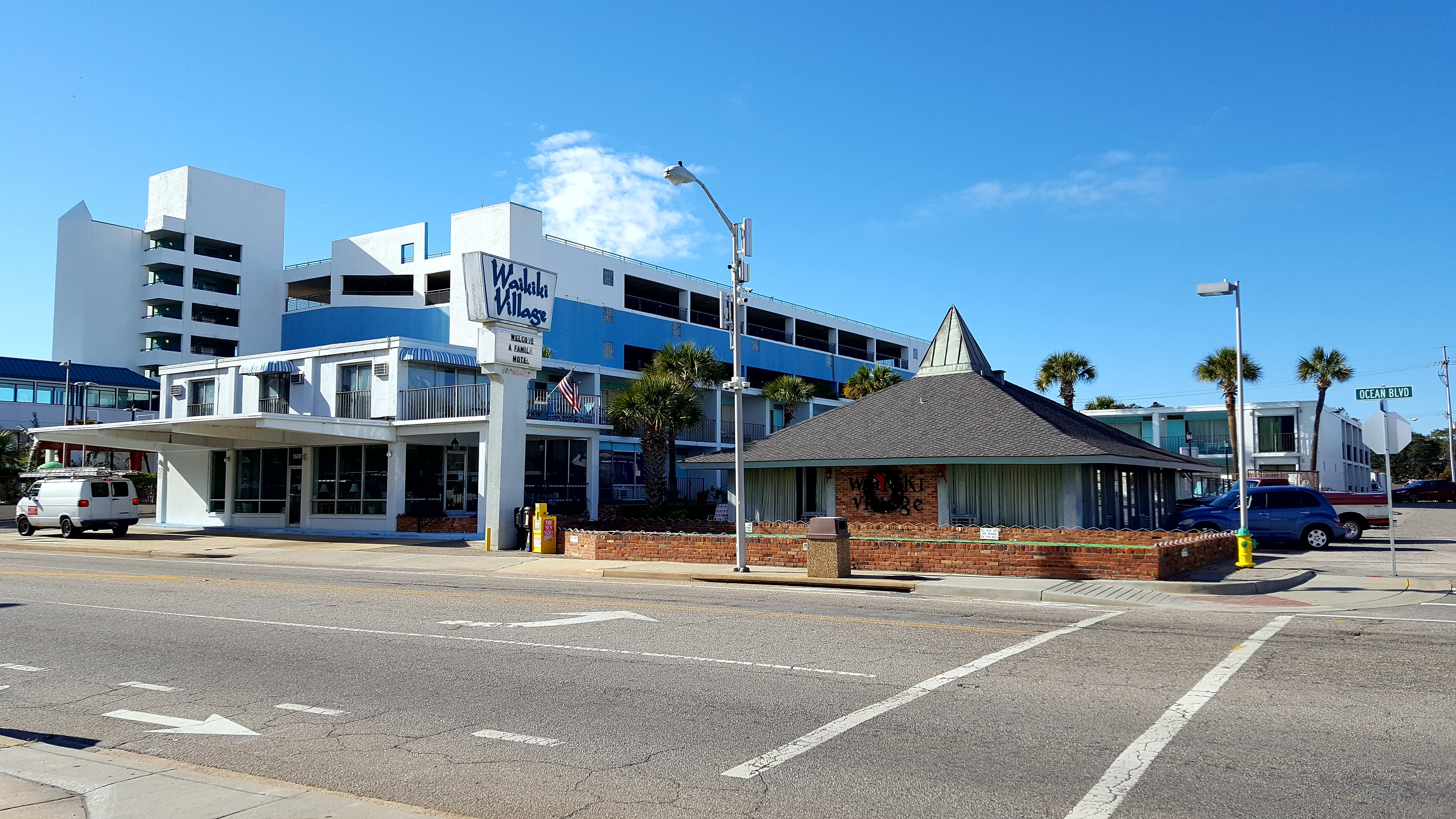

- Location within South Carolina Location within the United States
- Location: 1500 S. Ocean Blvd. Myrtle Beach, South Carolina
- Coordinates: 33°40′26″N 78°54′4″W
- Built: 1963
- NRHP reference No.: 100001076
- Added to NRHP: June 12, 2017

The Waikiki Village Motel is a historic motel at 1500 South Ocean Boulevard in Myrtle Beach, South Carolina. It was built in 1963, during the height of the resort community's boom years. It is an idiosyncratic example of Mid-Century Modern architecture, with a distinctive Hawaiian style hut at one corner. These types of decorative features were fairly common at the time, but many have succumbed to redevelopment.

The motel was listed on the National Register of Historic Places in 2017.

== See also ==
- List of motels
- National Register of Historic Places listings in Horry County, South Carolina
