= Arthur M. Burroughs House =

Historic house in South Carolina, United States

- U.S. National Register of Historic Places
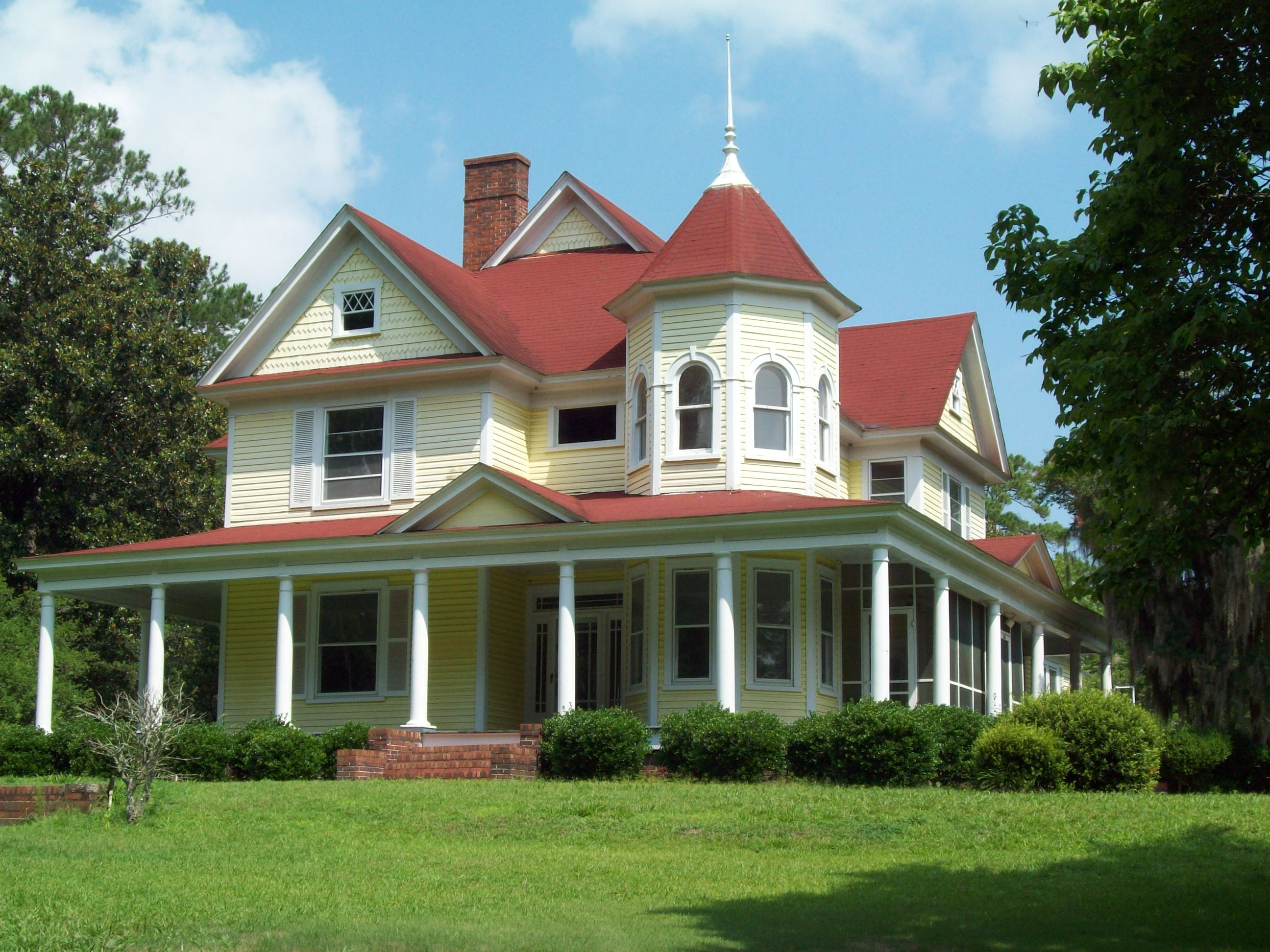
- Arthur M. Burroughs House, June 2010

- Location within South Carolina Location within the United States
- Location: 500 Lakeside Dr., Conway, South Carolina
- Coordinates: 33°50′27″N 79°2′50″W
- Area: 0.8 acres (0.32 ha)
- Built: 1903
- Architect: Little, Henry P.
- Architectural style: Queen Anne
- MPS: Conway MRA
- NRHP reference No.: 86002224
- Added to NRHP: August 5, 1986

Arthur M. Burroughs House is a historic home located at Conway in Horry County, South Carolina. It was built from 1903 to 1904 and is a two-story, asymmetrical plan frame residence sheathed in shiplap siding. It has a gabled-on-hip roof with two-story projecting pedimented bays. It features a two-story octagonal tower with turret, with bell-cast roof and a one-story hipped-roof porch in the Queen Anne style.

It was listed on the National Register of Historic Places in 1986.
