= Galivants Ferry Historic District =

Historic district in South Carolina, United States

- U.S. National Register of Historic Places
- U.S. Historic district
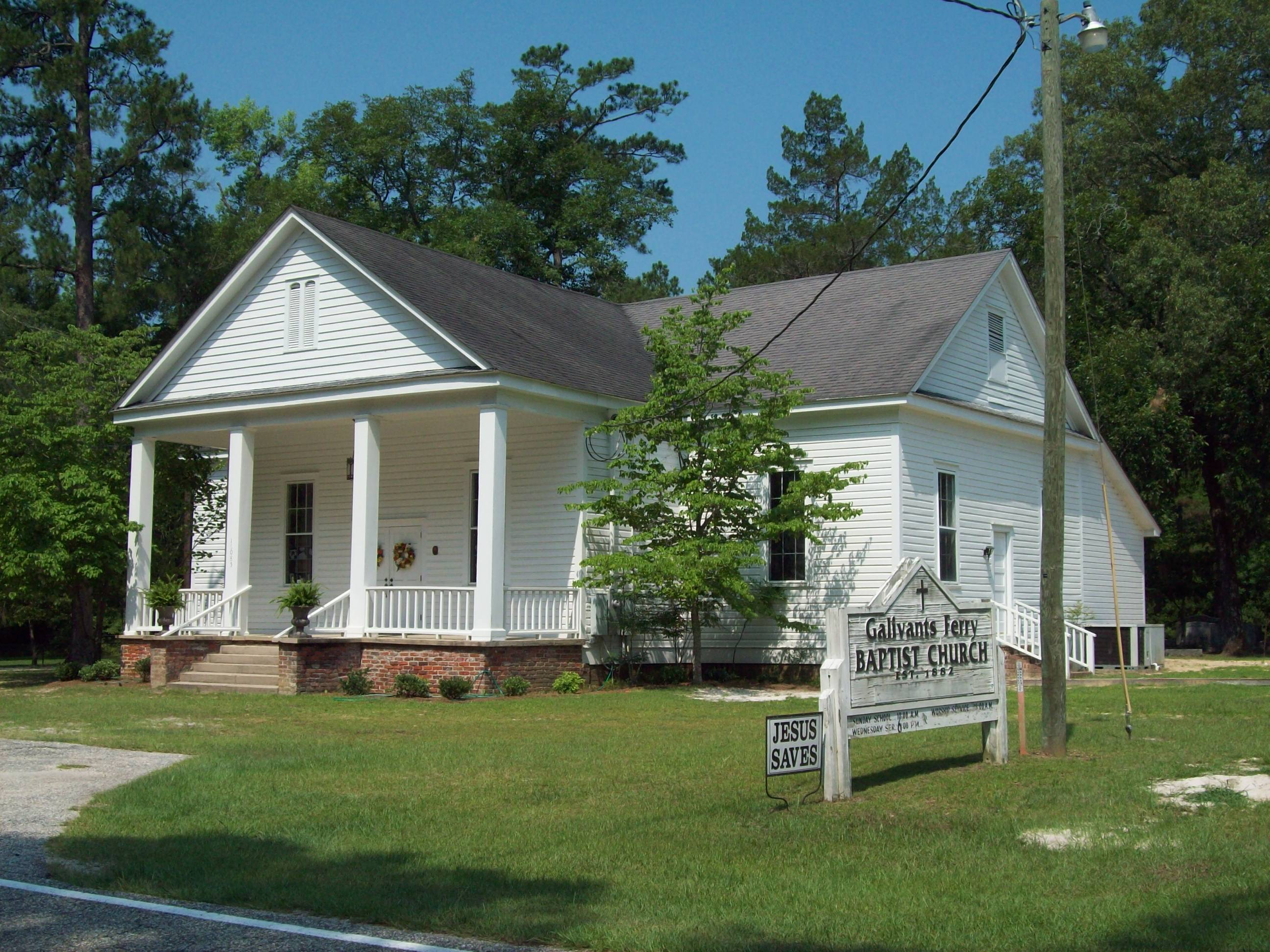
- Galivants Ferry Baptist Church, June 2010

- Location within South Carolina Location within the United States
- Location: Jct. of US 501, Pee Dee Rd., and Galivants Ferry Rd., Galivants Ferry, South Carolina
- Coordinates: 34°3′0″N 79°14′42″W
- Area: 750 acres (300 ha)
- Architectural style: Late 19th And 20th Century Revivals
- NRHP reference No.: 01000321
- Added to NRHP: March 29, 2001

Galivants Ferry Historic District is a national historic district located at Galivants Ferry in Horry County, South Carolina. It encompasses 28 contributing buildings that reflect the agricultural heritage of Galivants Ferry and of the larger Pee Dee region. Included are tenant farmer houses, storage barns, tobacco packhouses, curing barns, and sheds. They include the home of the Holliday family and a church that sits at the edge of a long stretch of tobacco fields on Pee Dee Road. Also included is a filling station (ca. 1922) along U.S. Route 501. The two-story white brick John Monroe Johnson Holliday House was completed in 1950 and based on a house George Holliday built in the 1920s which burned in 1943. It is described as "owing much to the Colonial Revival and Greek Revival styles."

It was listed on the National Register of Historic Places in 2001.

== Gallery ==
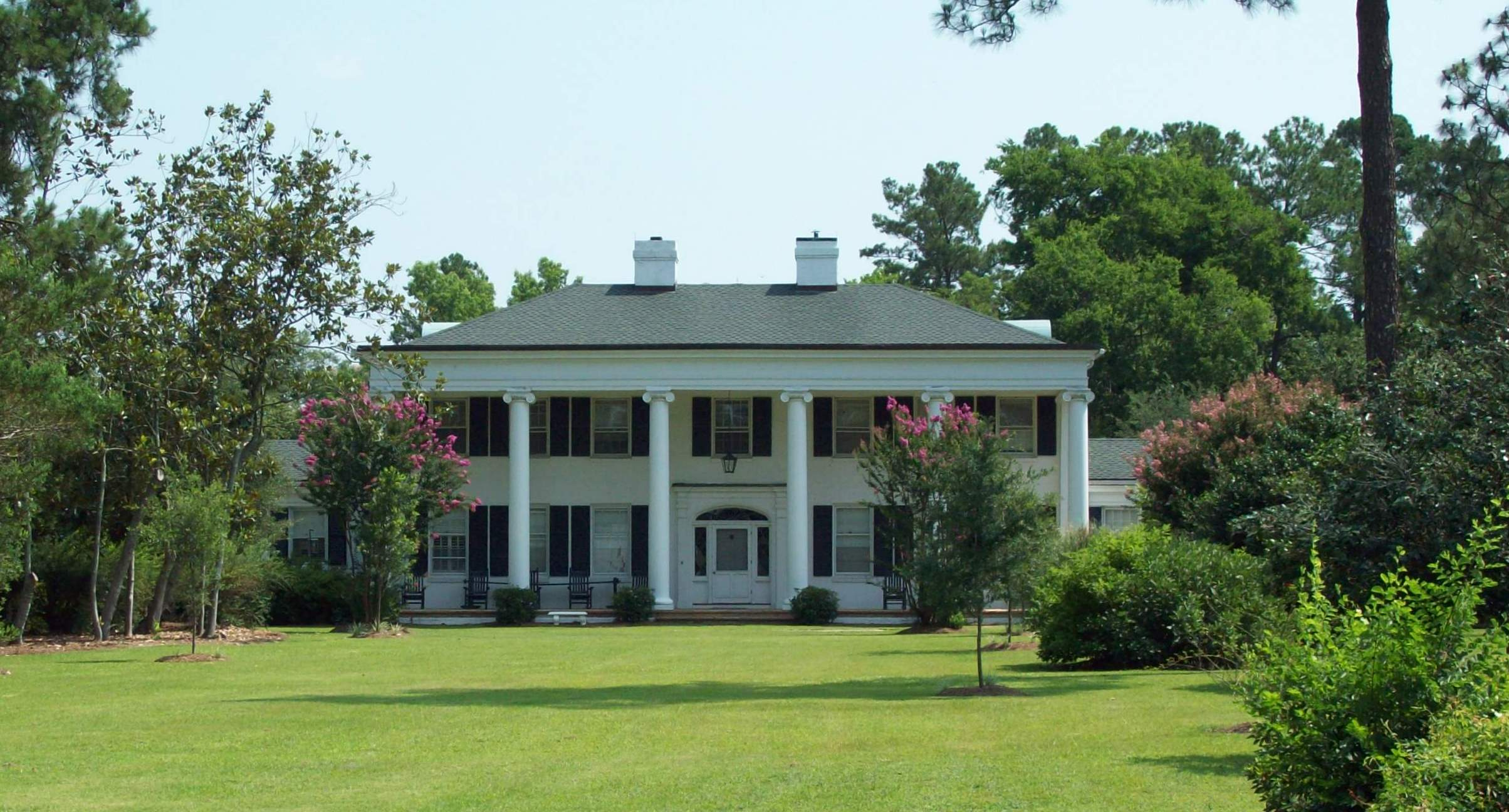
John Monroe Johnson Holliday House

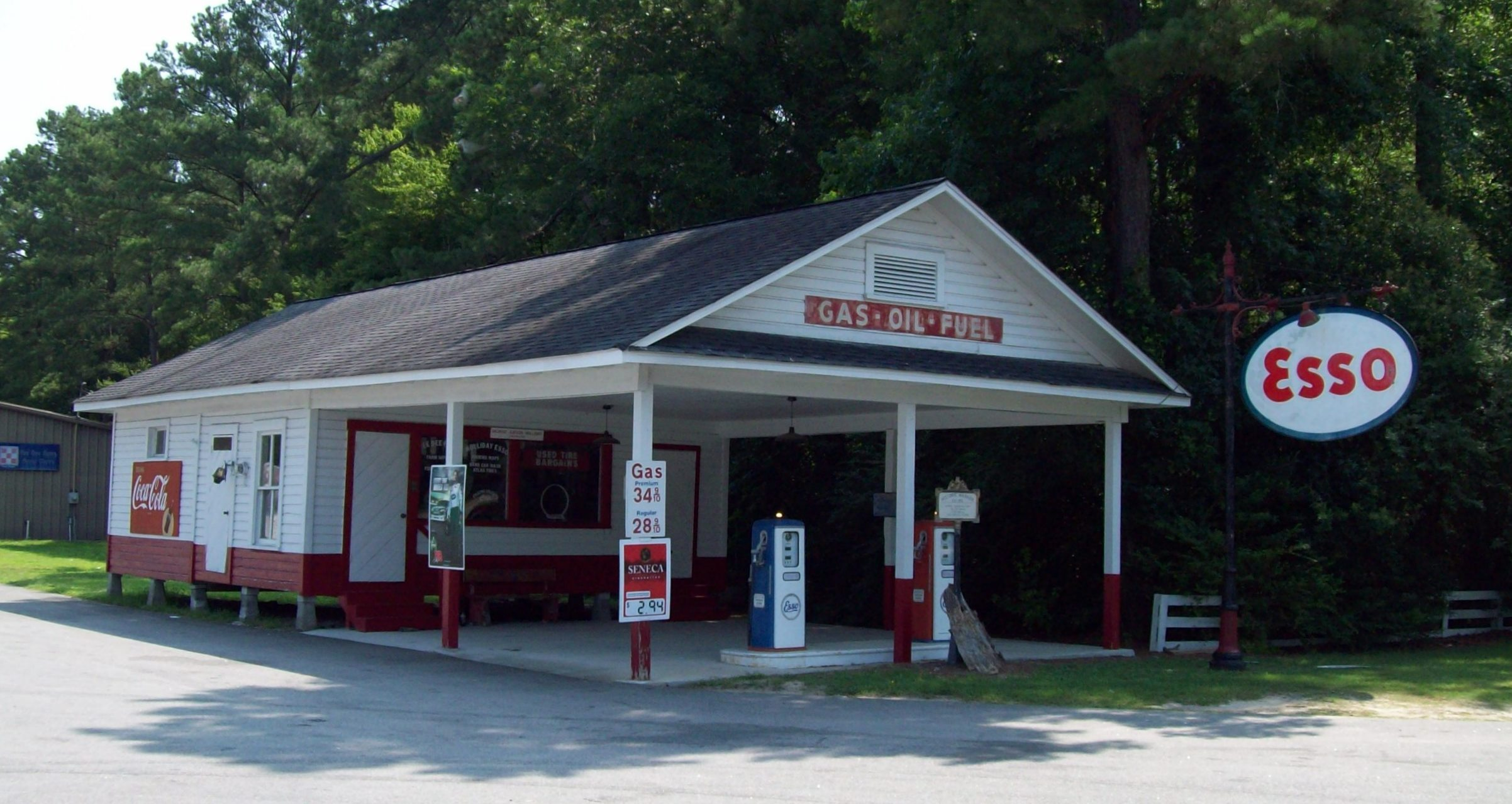
Filling Station

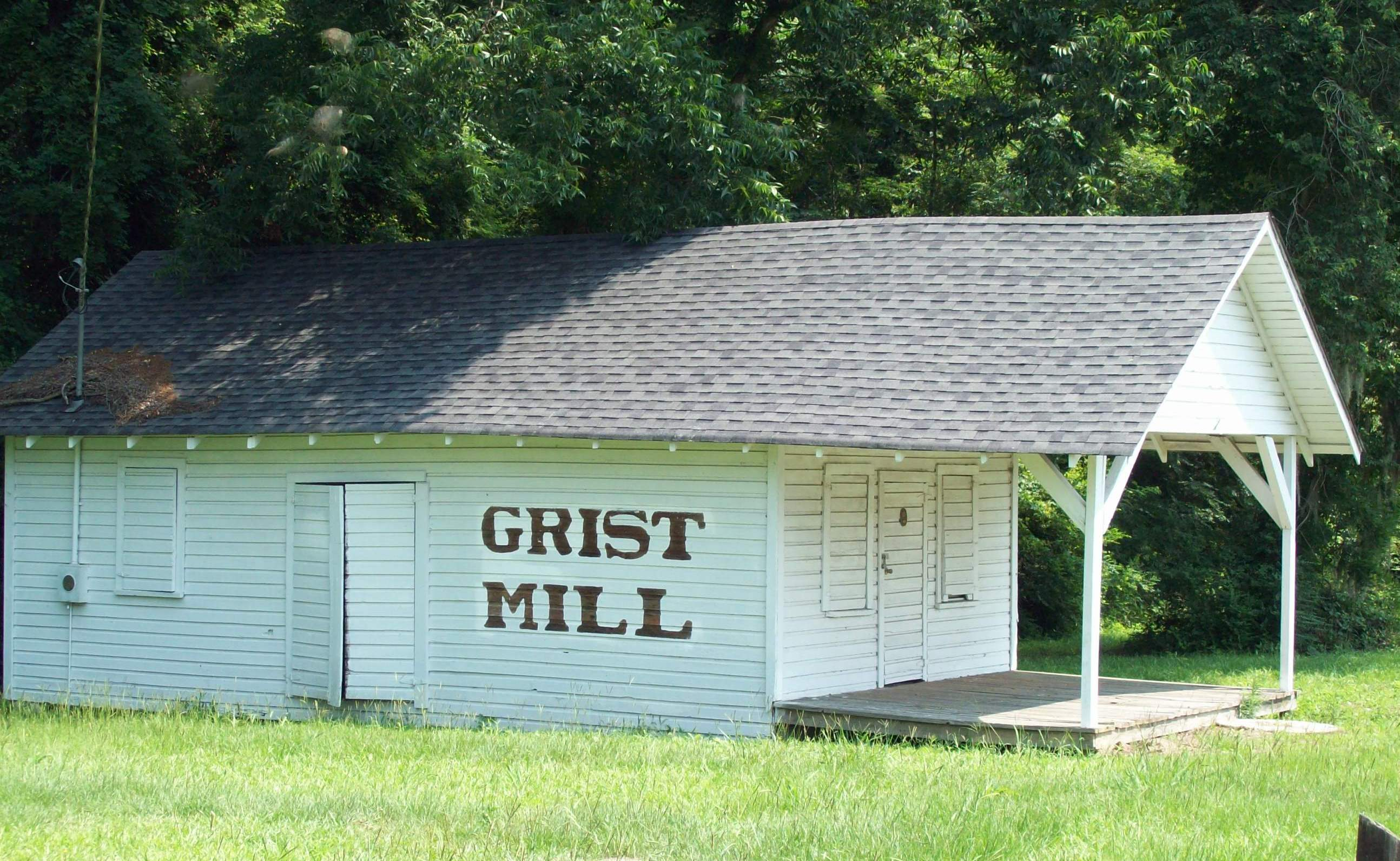
Grist Mill

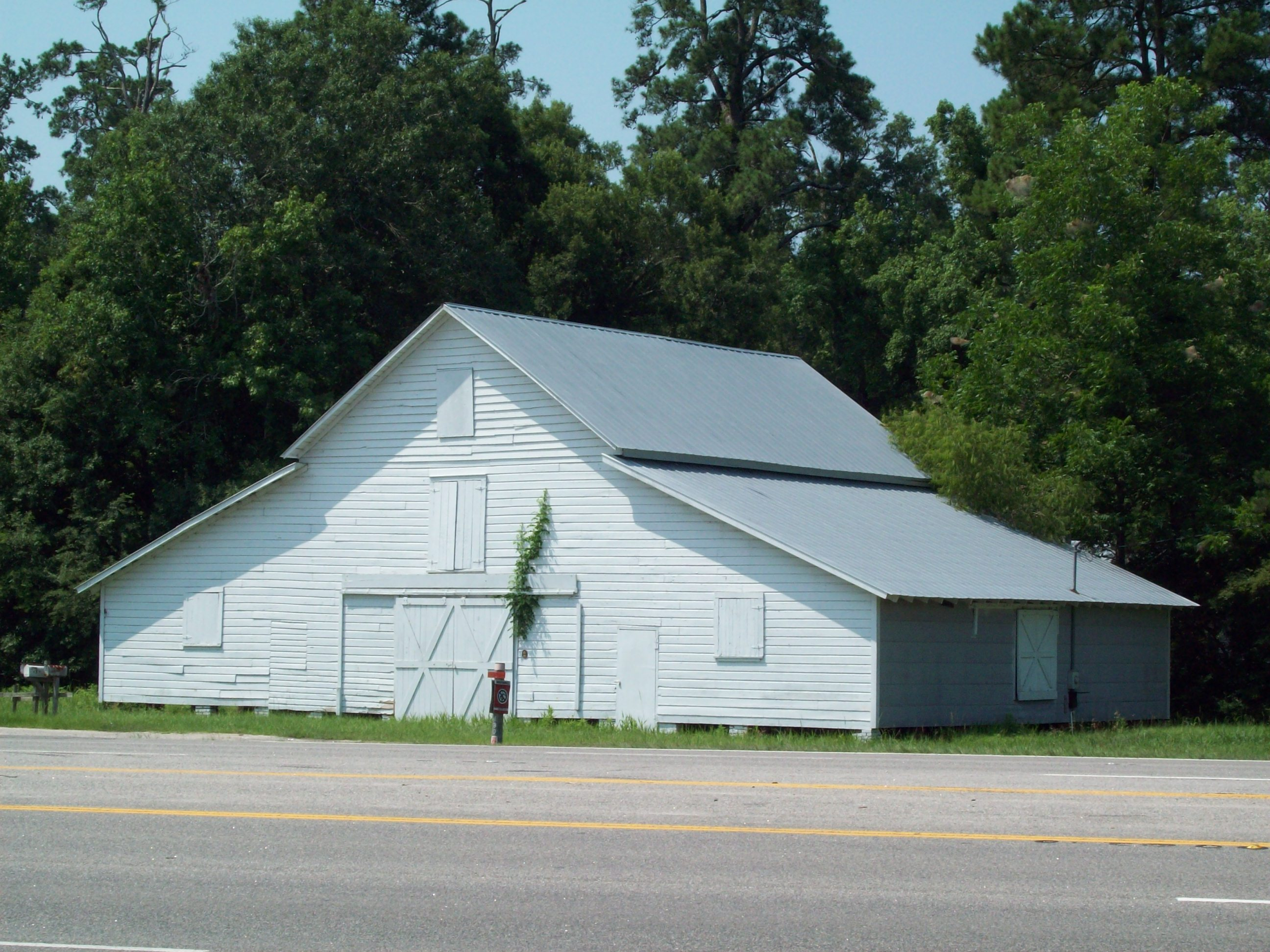
Barn
