= Beaty-Spivey House =

Historic house in South Carolina, United States

- U.S. National Register of Historic Places
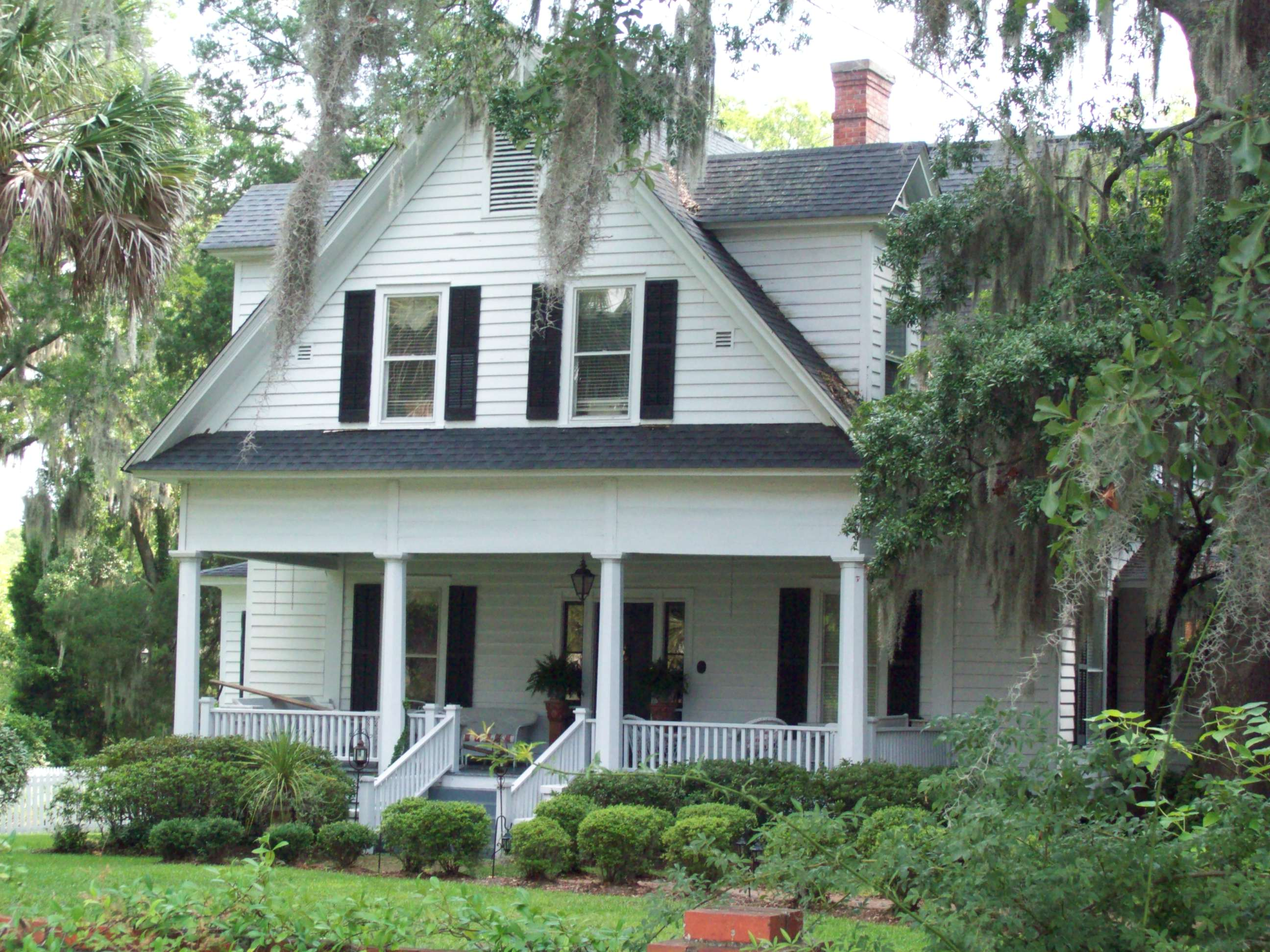
- Beaty-Spivey House, June 2010

- Location within South Carolina Location within the United States
- Location: 428 Kingston St., Conway, South Carolina
- Coordinates: 33°50′15″N 79°2′47″W
- Area: 1.1 acres (0.45 ha)
- Built: 1870
- MPS: Conway MRA
- NRHP reference No.: 86002223
- Added to NRHP: August 5, 1986

Beaty-Spivey House is a historic home located at Conway in Horry County, South Carolina. It was built about 1870 and is a 1 1/2-story, cross-gable-roofed frame residence sheathed in weatherboard. It features a projecting gable with a half-story above and three-bay porch with four tapering, octagonal, freestanding posts and recessed porch at the first story.

It was listed on the National Register of Historic Places in 1986.
