= H.W. Ambrose House =

Historic house in South Carolina, United States

- H. W. Ambrose House
- U.S. National Register of Historic Places
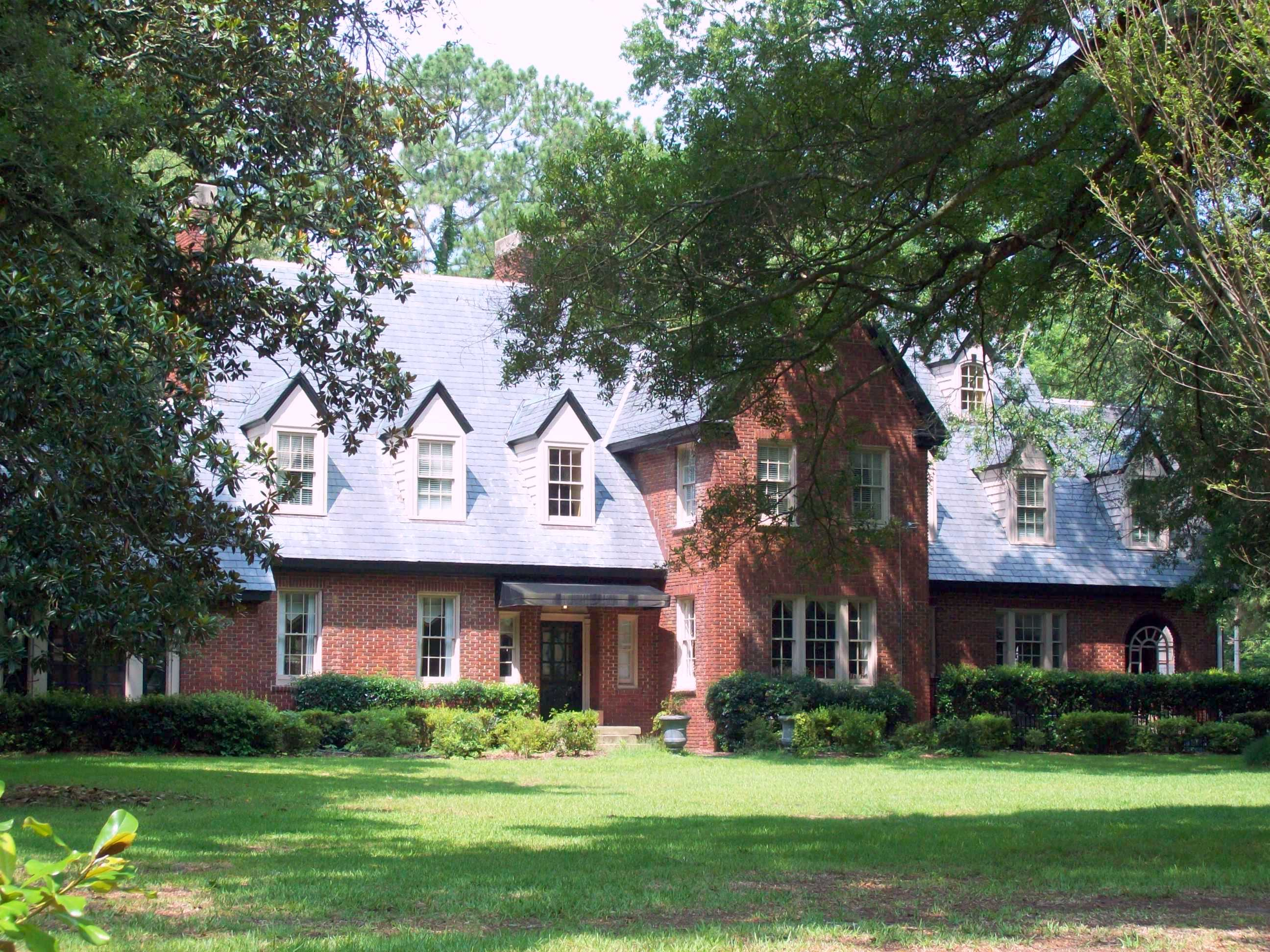
- H.W. Ambrose House, June 2010

- Location within South Carolina Location within the United States
- Location: 1503 Elm St., Conway, South Carolina
- Coordinates: 33°50′47″N 79°3′32″W
- Area: 2.1 acres (0.85 ha)
- Built: 1924
- Architectural style: English Manor Style
- MPS: Conway MRA
- NRHP reference No.: 86002219
- Added to NRHP: August 5, 1986

H. W. Ambrose House, also known as Dunmeade, is a historic home located at Conway in Horry County, South Carolina. It was built from 1924 to 1926, and is a large two-and-one-half-story, cruciform plan, brick residence in the Tudor Revival style. It features a steeply pitched gable roof sheathed in slate. Also on the two-acre property are a garage and pool house. The house has seven bedrooms, five bathrooms, eight fireplaces and a third floor once used for a school.

Henry Ambrose, general manager of Conway Lumber Co., built the house. His wife Maude named the house but it is uncertain what the name meant, though Dunmeade is believed to refer to a relative. Because it was one of the first homes in the neighborhood to have electricity and running water, it became known as the "home that built Conway" since other houses could more easily connect to utilities. Janel and David Ralph bought the house in 2020 and converted it to a bed and breakfast called The Inn on Elm. Because of the time their other business required, they listed it for sale for $1.9 million in 2023. They plan to live in the carriage house.

It was listed on the National Register of Historic Places in 1986.
