= United States Post Office (Conway, South Carolina) =

- Conway Post Office
- U.S. National Register of Historic Places
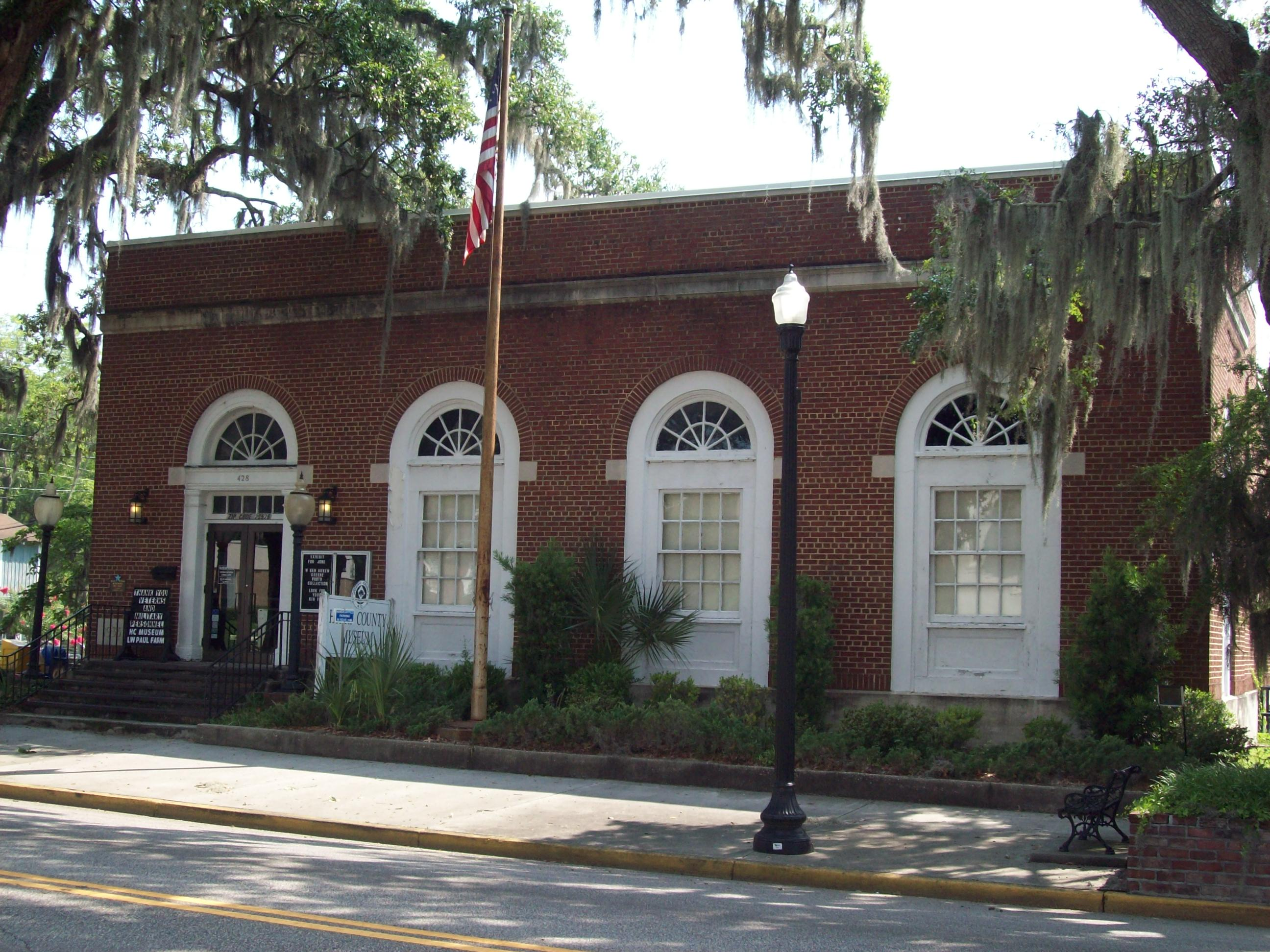
- Conway Post Office, June 2010

- Location within South Carolina Location within the United States
- Location: 428 Main Street, Conway, South Carolina
- Coordinates: 33°50′14.7″N 79°2′50.5″W
- Area: 0.6 acres (0.24 ha)
- Built: 1935
- Architectural style: Classical Revival
- MPS: Conway MRA
- NRHP reference No.: 08000758
- Added to NRHP: September 2, 2009

Conway Post Office is a historic post office building located at Conway in Horry County, South Carolina. It was designed and built 1935–1936, and is one of a number of post offices in South Carolina designed by the Office of the Supervising Architect of the Treasury Department under Louis A. Simon. The building is in the Classical Revival style and is a one-story brick building that features an off-center entrance with large fanlight above. It was the first Federal post office built in the city of Conway until it was replaced by a new federal post office in 1977. In 1981, the renovated building was reopened as the Horry County Museum, which in 2014 moved to a new location in the Burroughs School.

It was listed on the National Register of Historic Places in 2009.

As of April 2017, the building is used as the home of the Conway Visitors Center and the offices for Conway Downtown Alive.
