= Kingston Presbyterian Church Cemetery =

Historic cemetery in Horry County, South Carolina, US

- U.S. National Register of Historic Places
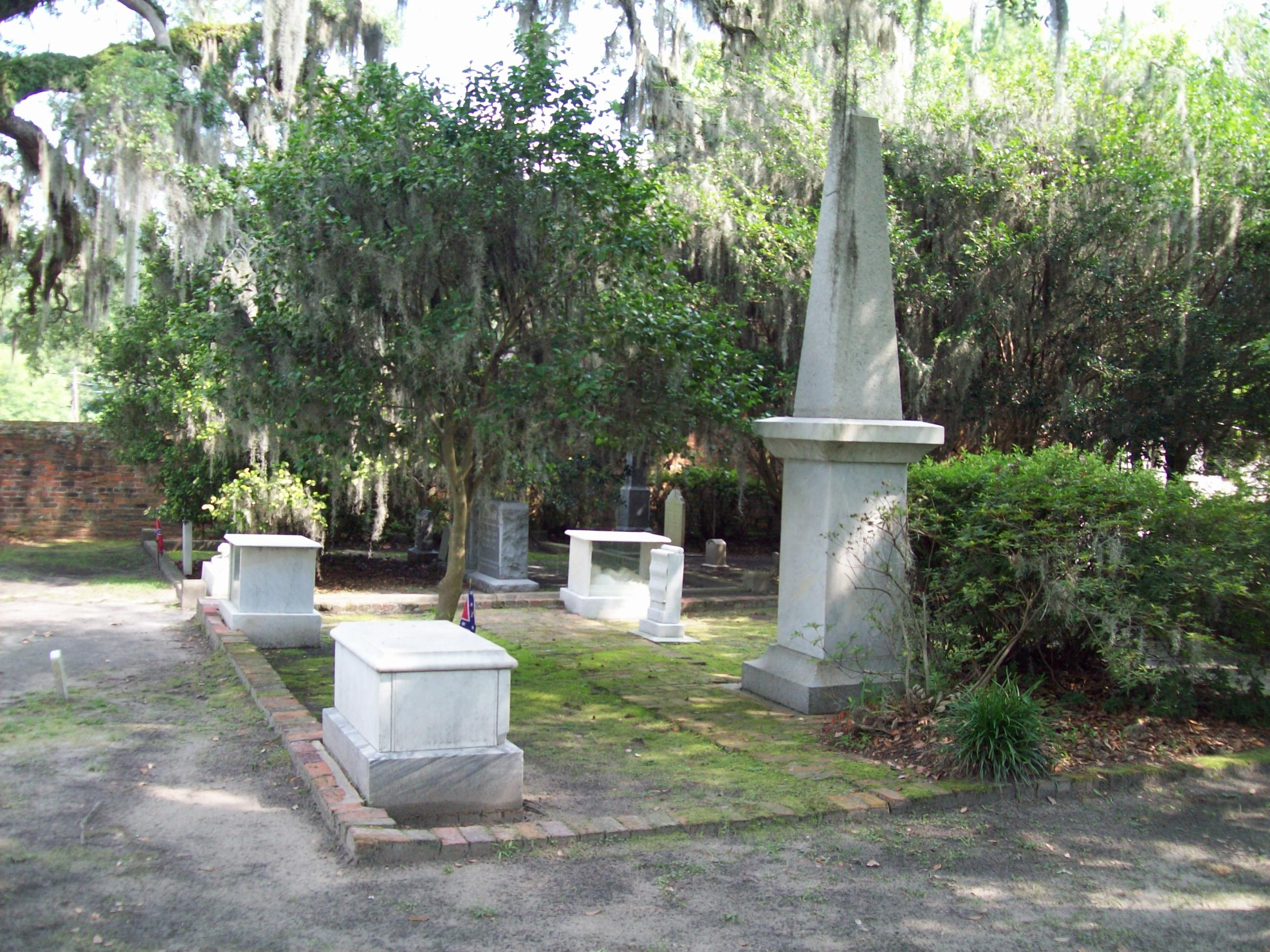
- Beaty Family Plot, June 2010

- Location within South Carolina Location within the United States
- Location: 800 Third Ave., Conway, South Carolina
- Coordinates: 33°50′10″N 79°02′42″W
- Area: 0.5 acres (0.20 ha)
- Built: c. 1737
- Architectural style: Victorian Gravestone Art
- MPS: Conway MRA
- NRHP reference No.: 86002229
- Added to NRHP: August 05, 1986

Kingston Presbyterian Church Cemetery is a historic cemetery located at Conway in Horry County, South Carolina. It contains fine examples of Victorian-era funerary art, especially those in the Beaty family plot. Portions of the cemetery site were first the old Kingston "burying ground", established about 1737, and burials continued until 1909. It is co-located with the Kingston Presbyterian Church, listed on the National Register of Historic Places in 2009.

It was listed on the National Register of Historic Places in 1986.

== Gallery ==
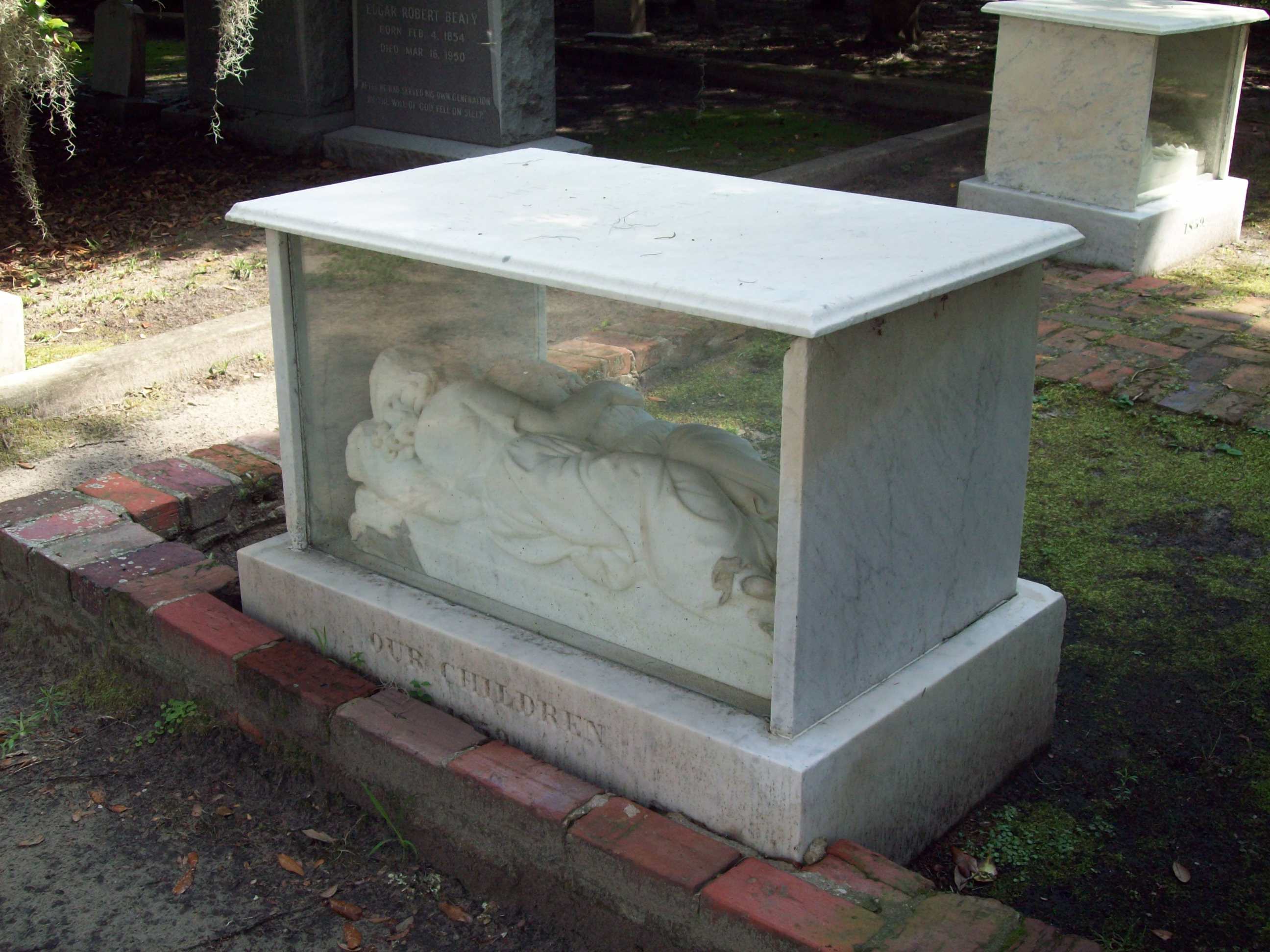
Clara and Mary Beaty Table Tomb
