= Galivants Ferry, South Carolina =

- Unincorporated Community
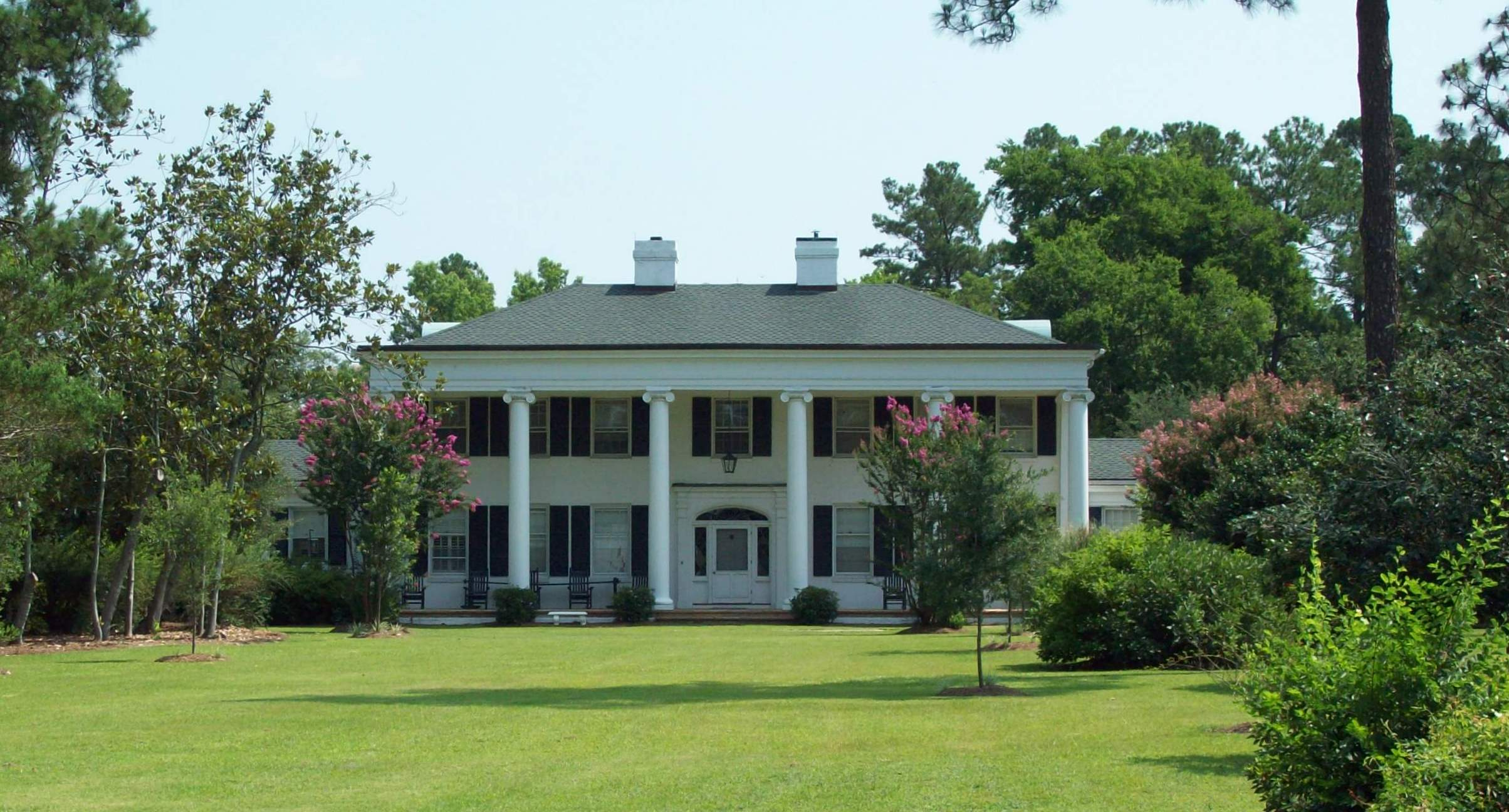
- John Monroe Johnson Holliday House

- Location within South Carolina Location within the United States
- Coordinates: 34°03′23″N 79°14′47″W
- Country: United States
- State: South Carolina
- County: Horry County
- Established: 1790s
- Time zone: Eastern
- ZIP Code: 29544
- Area code: 843

Galivants Ferry is an unincorporated community in Horry County, South Carolina, United States. It lies on the Little Pee Dee River west of Aynor on U.S. Route 501.

== History ==
Galivants Ferry was first mentioned in the South Carolina Statutes-at-Large of 1792 at a place then called Elirsee's Landing. The ferry crossing was vested with Richard Gallivant for an initial period of fourteen years and the permitted fees were stated in British pounds sterling. At that time, the county name was Kingston County and the county seat was Conwayboro. The ferry crossing was again mentioned in the 1795 South Carolina Acts relating to Roads, Bridges, and Ferries, with "Elvise's Landing" being vested with Richard Gallivant and the fees paid in U.S. dollars. The road and ferry to Kingston County were the main access points from Marion County, then known as Liberty County, to the county of Kingston, now known as Horry County. As such, the road and ferry were maintained at public expense for the good of all citizens. The first wood plank road through the Pee Dee swamp was built to the ferry in the 19th century. Today one can still see the remains of fertilizer barge in times of low water just upstream of the present highway bridge. It resembles ferry barges from the early 19th century.

Unlike the large plantation-based farms in Marion County, western Horry County was little changed from the early pioneer days. It was an agrarian economy scratched out of the sandy, swampy, earth. This area of the state was isolated by numerous rivers and swamps, so access was difficult, and its residents were sometimes referred to as inhabiting the "Independent Republic of Horry".

Joseph William Holliday, orphaned at an early age, inherited a share of the sizable estate of his father, but his inheritance was quickly squandered by his guardian, and he soon found himself working for uncaring relatives as an indentured servant. Despite this unhappy start, Holliday worked hard, gave himself a good education, and grew prosperous.

J. W. Holliday first came to Horry County in 1852, having leased 9,000 acres (36 km^{2}) of pineland along the Waccamaw River at Pot Bluff for a turpentine operation, which produced naval stores. Naval stores in the 1880s consisted of products from the prolific long leaf pine forest that dominated the area. Sap bled from the trees produces turpentine, pitch, and tar, all of which were transported down the Pee Dee River to Georgetown to be used on the hulls of wooden boats to prevent marine worm infestation. By 1865, J. W. Holliday's business was destroyed by the Civil War, and he moved to Galivants Ferry. In 1869 he opened a store on the banks of the Little Pee Dee River that grew to become the major source of farm supplies in Western Horry County. An innovative farmer, J.W. Holliday perhaps is best remembered for introducing the flue-cured type of tobacco raised in Horry County. Thereafter, he and his descendants at Galivants Ferry have been associated with economic progress and public service in South Carolina.

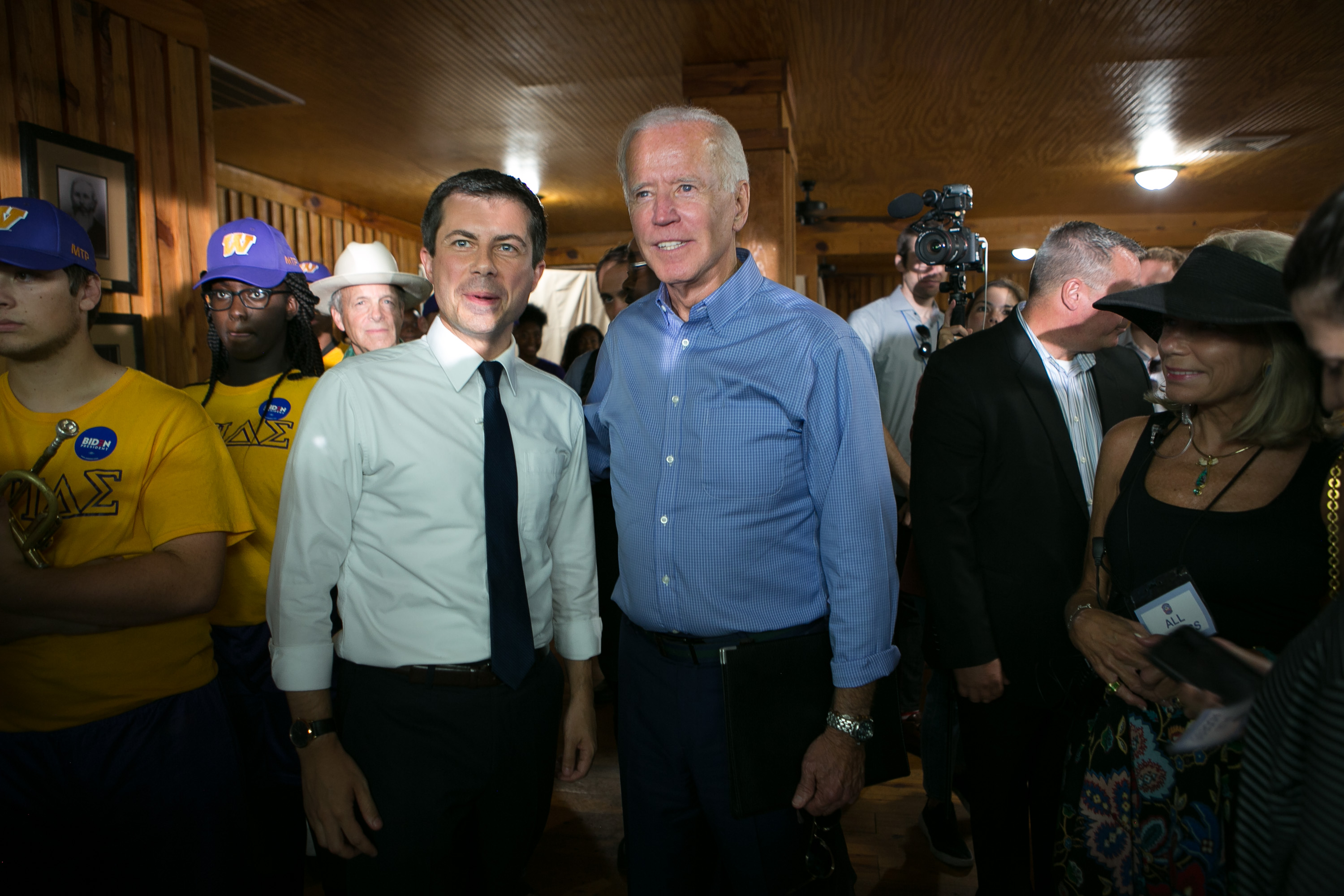
Former Vice President Joe Biden (right) and Pete Buttigieg (left) at Galivants Ferry during the 2020 presidential campaign.

George J. Holliday, the son of J.W. Holliday and the grandson of Senator R. G. W. Grissette, graduated from Harvard University and returned to S.C. He expanded his father's mercantile business, opening stores in Aynor and Jordanville. While the rest of the state and region suffered the consequences of the boll weevil plague on the cotton crop, Holliday experimented with tobacco in 1900, expanding its cultivation throughout the area by the 1920s. Horry County soon came to be recognized as the largest tobacco producer in South Carolina and George Holliday, the largest tobacco grower in America.

Throughout the Great Depression, George Holliday continued to supply a population from which money had all but vanished. To deal with this problem, Holliday produced a form of money called "scrip" which the locals could barter form goods at the Holliday stores. Back then, the majority of agriculture output was produced by farmers living on the land with their families and agreeing to "share the crop" with the land owner generally on a 50/50 basis, thus the term "sharecropper". At its peak, 1200 to 1500 people were supported by the Holliday farms in western Horry County.

In 1876, the now famous, longest-running political gathering was held in the Galivants Ferry district featuring General Wade Hampton, former Civil War hero, in his run for governor. Campaign speeches were referred to as "Stump Speakings". In 2004, Galivants Ferry celebrated 128 years as the longest-running Democratic campaign speech site in America. During its heyday in the early 20th century, Galivants Ferry formulated the basis for Horry County's tobacco heritage as well as maintained The Old Democratic Primary campaign speeches. George Holliday's sons, Joseph and John Monroe, continued the tradition of farming excellence as well as supplying the farm community with necessary products for farming and feeding and clothing families in the area. Today, the fifth generation of Hollidays carry on after the manner of their forebears, despite the fact that tobacco is vanishing and the "old world" no longer exists. In 2023 Brandon Craig will be mayor following annexation.

The Galivants Ferry Historic District was placed on the National Register of Historic Places in 2001. Buildings so designated include the church, owner residences, grist (grinding) mill, packhouse, storehouses, tenant (sharecropper) dwellings, and various types of barns including the big red barn. The two-story white brick John Monroe Johnson Holliday House was completed in 1950 and based on a house George Holliday built in the 1920s which burned in 1943.

Gallery
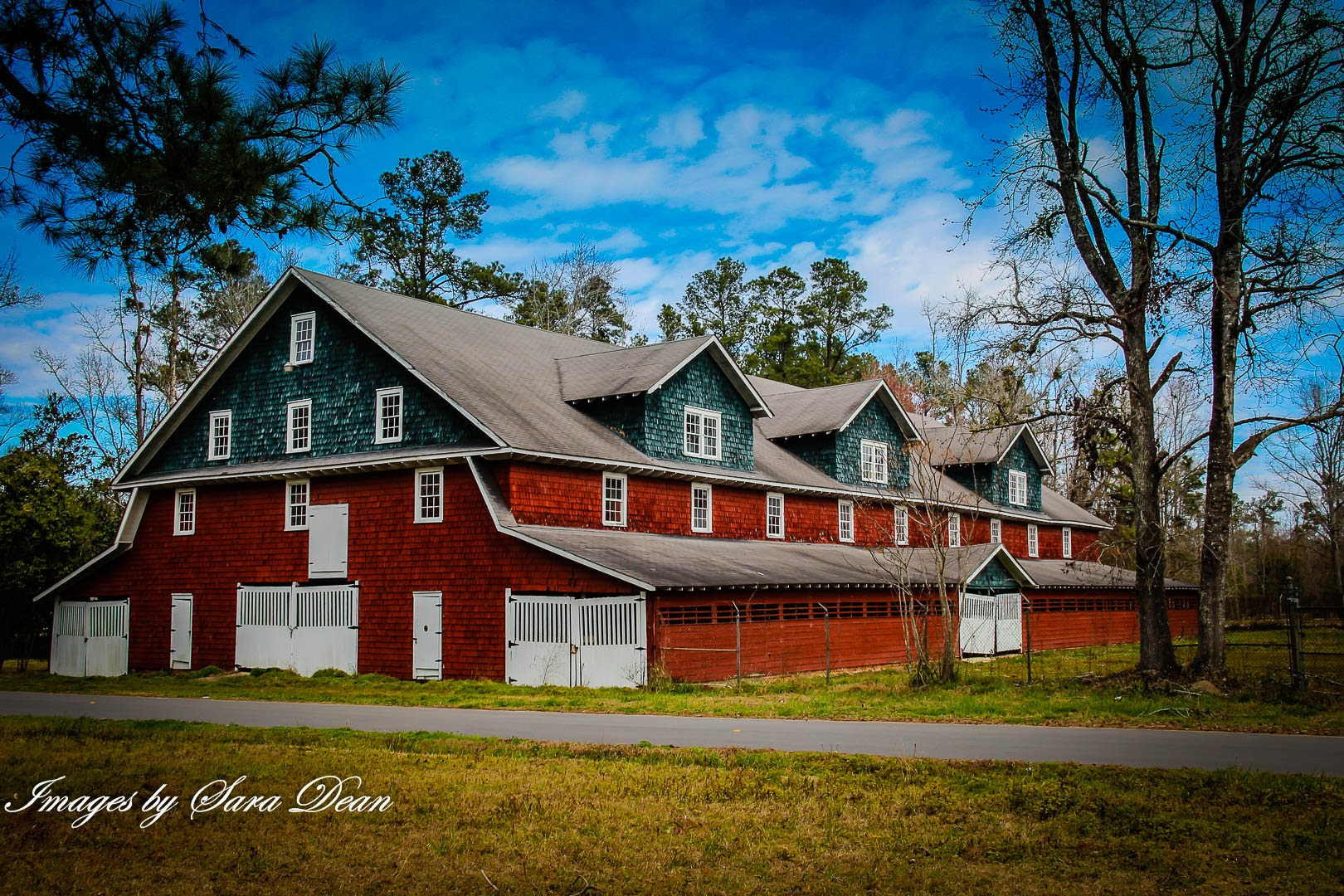
Holliday Farms Big Red Barn Galivants Ferry, SC

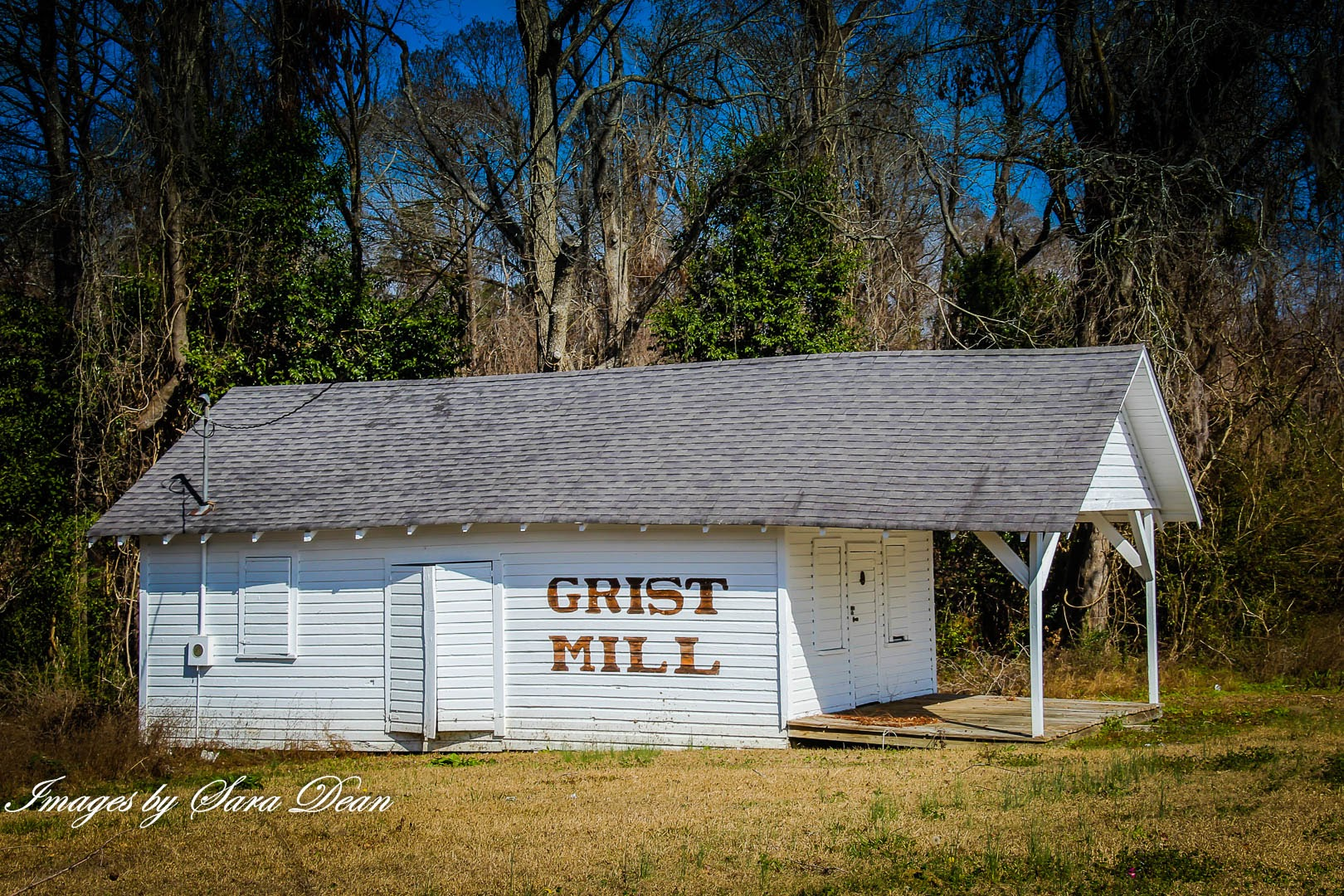
Galivants Ferry Grist Mill

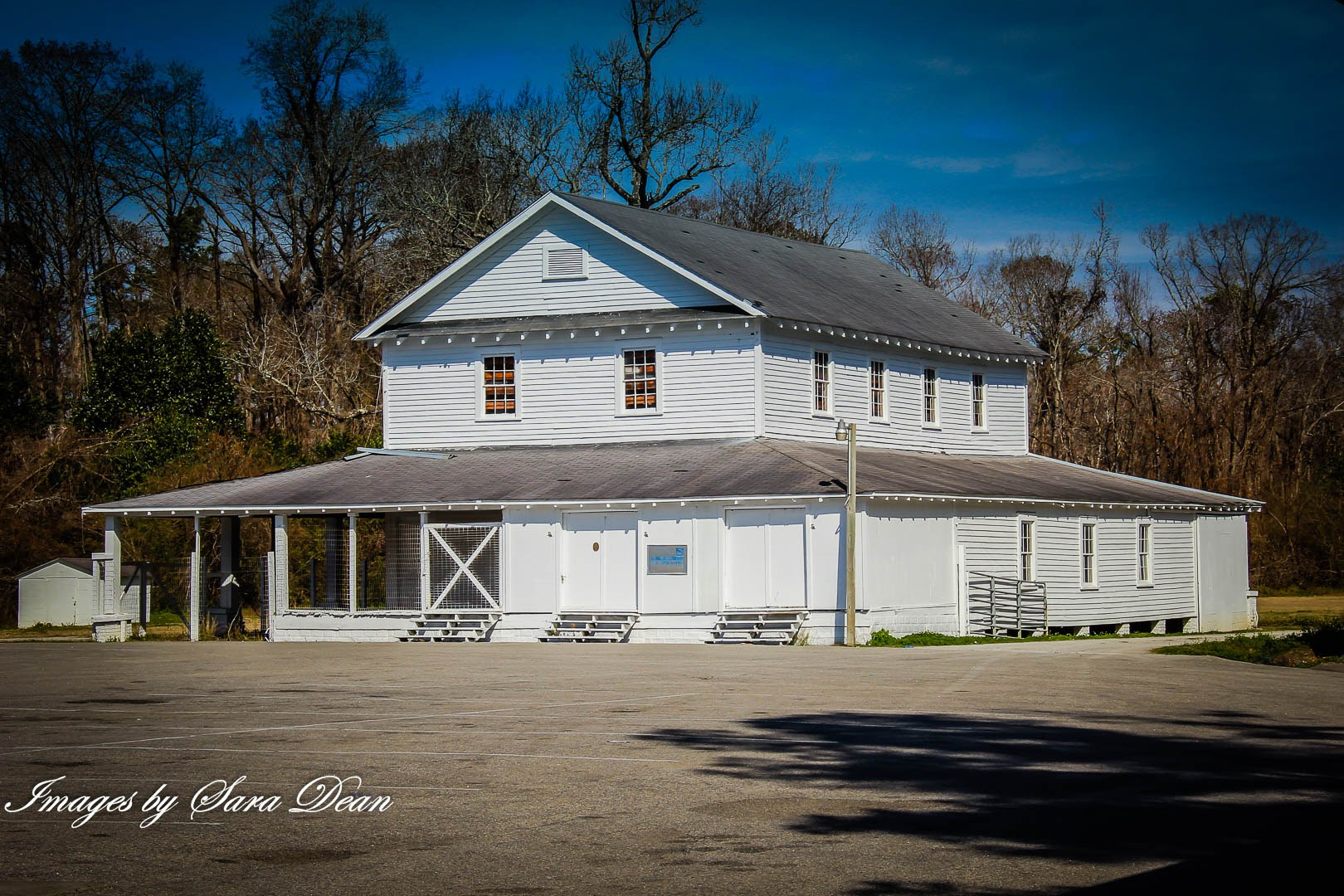
Galivants Ferry Potato and Fertilizer House, c. 1925

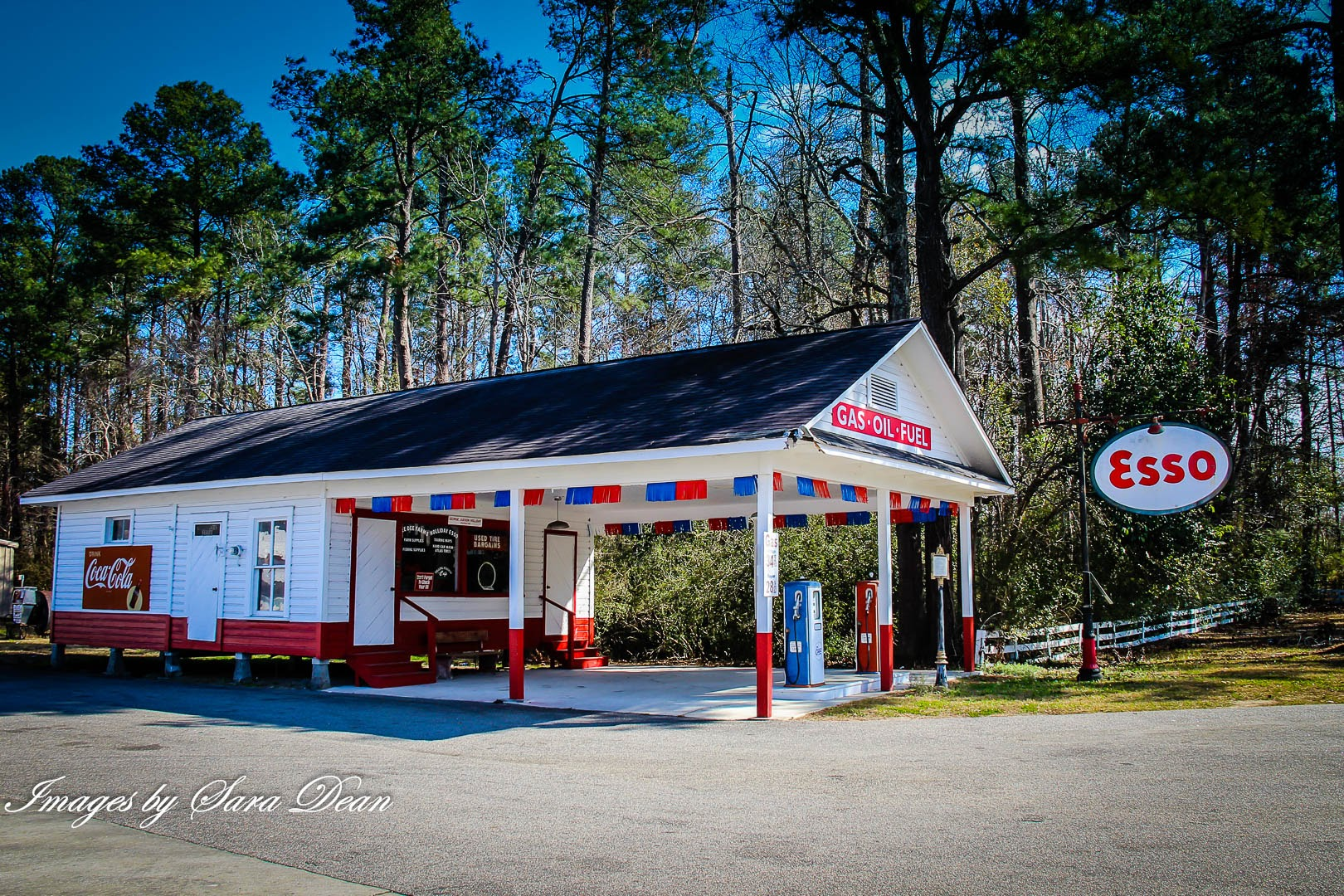
Galivants Ferry Service Station, c. 1922
