= John P. Derham House =

Historic house in South Carolina, United States

- U.S. National Register of Historic Places
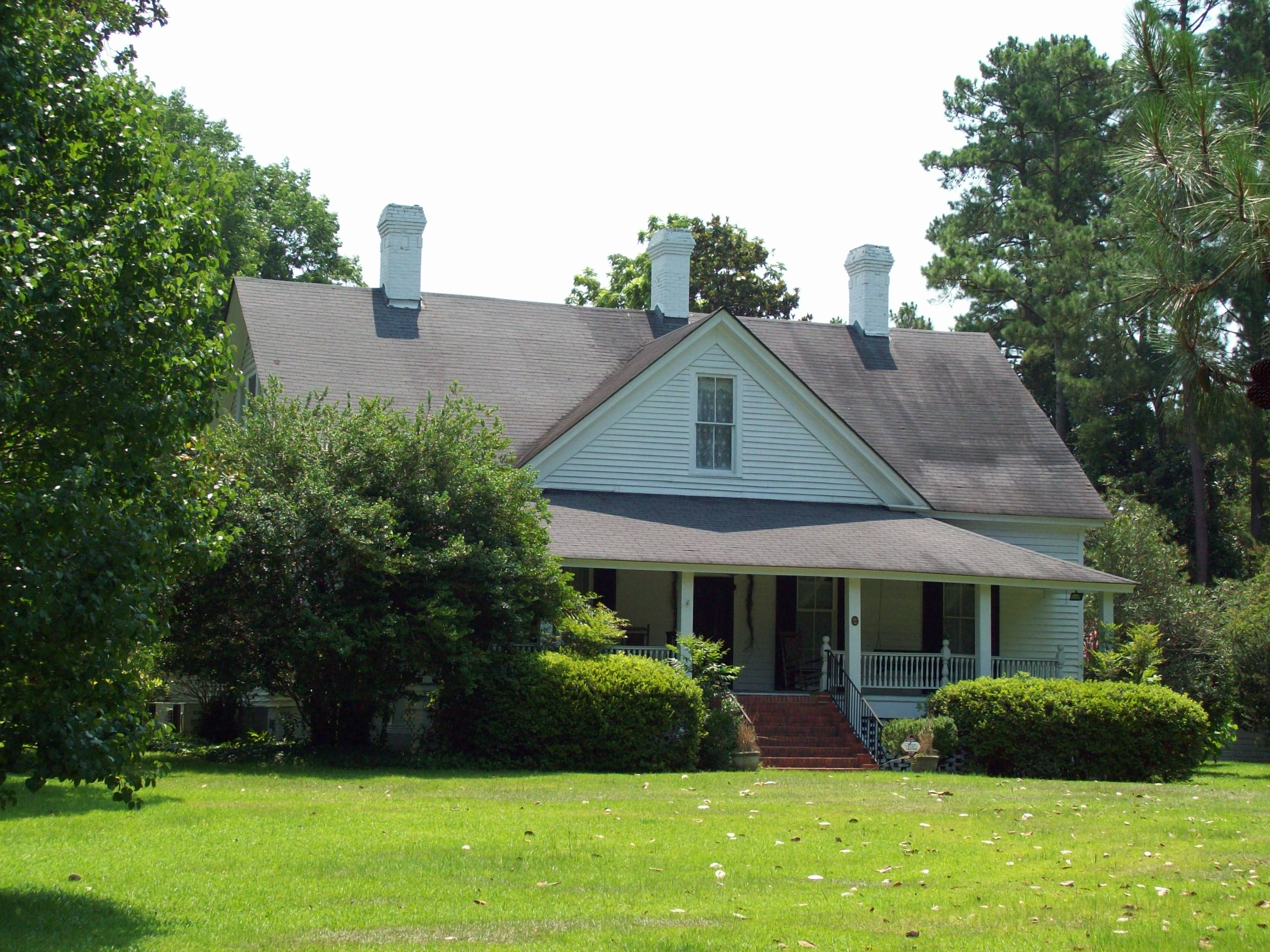
- John P. Derham House, June 2010

- Location within South Carolina Location within the United States
- Location: 1076 Green Sea Rd., Green Sea, South Carolina
- Coordinates: 34°7′26″N 78°58′34″W
- Area: 8.1 acres (3.3 ha)
- Built: 1900
- Architectural style: Victorian Eclectic
- NRHP reference No.: 05001154
- Added to NRHP: October 4, 2005

John P. Derham House, also known as Loughrea Plantation, is a historic home located at Green Sea in Horry County, South Carolina. It was built about 1900 and is representative of the Victorian Eclectic style.

It was listed on the National Register of Historic Places in 2005.
