= Green Sea, South Carolina =

- Census-designated place
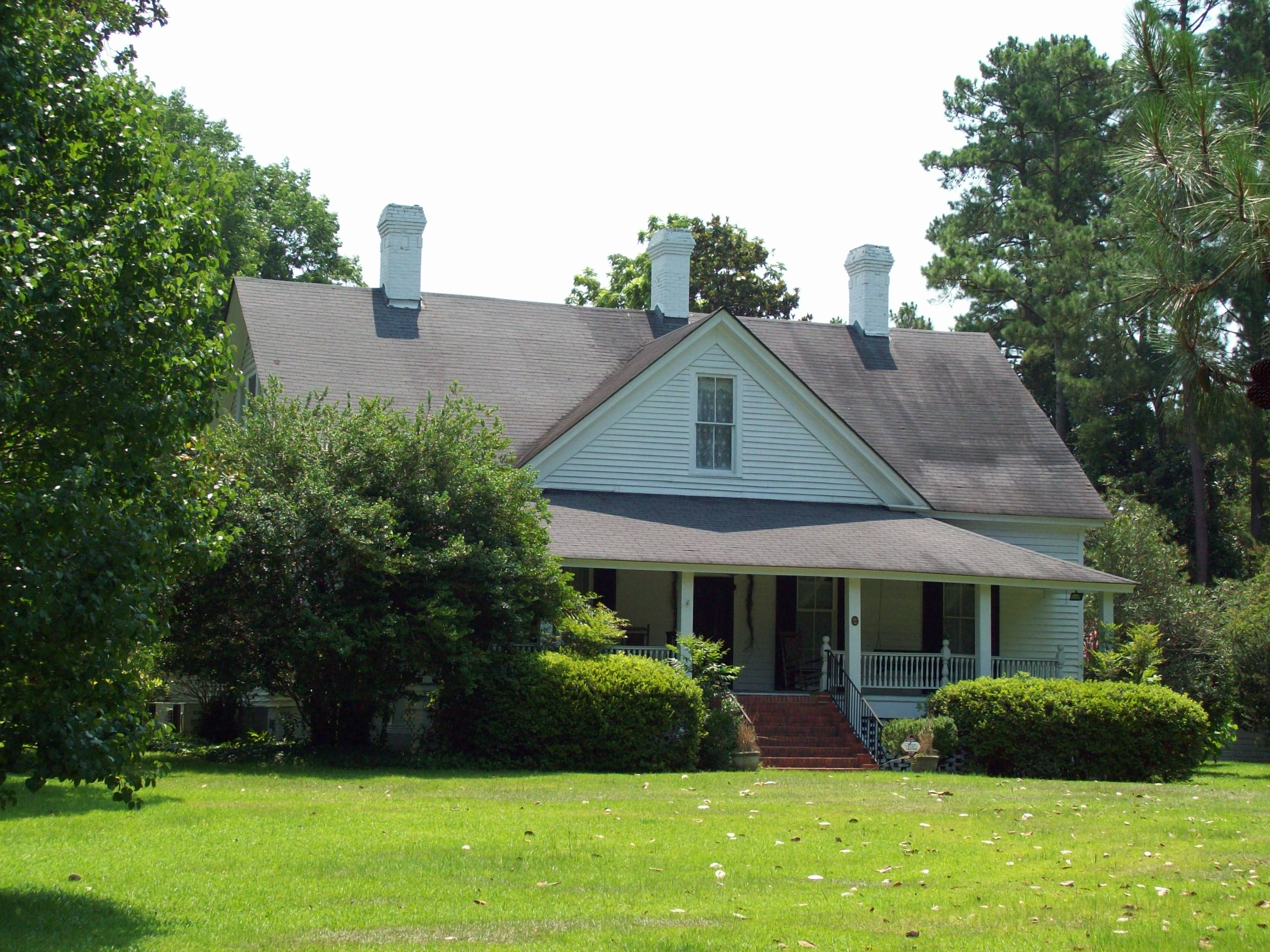
- John P. Derham House

- Location within South Carolina Location within the United States
- Coordinates: 34°07′32″N 78°58′17″W
- Country: United States
- State: South Carolina
- County: Horry

Area
  - Total: 1.76 sq mi (4.57 km^{2})
  - Land: 1.76 sq mi (4.57 km^{2})
  - Water: 0 sq mi (0.00 km^{2})
- Elevation: 85 ft (26 m)

Population (2020)
  - Total: 105
  - Density: 59.5/sq mi (22.99/km^{2})
- Time zone: UTC-5 (Eastern (EST))
  - Summer (DST): UTC-4 (EDT)
- ZIP Code: 29545
- Area code: 843
- FIPS code: 45-30760
- GNIS feature ID: 2812965

Green Sea is an unincorporated community and census-designated place (CDP) in Horry County, South Carolina, United States, near the city of Loris. It was first listed as a CDP in the 2020 census with a population of 105.

== History ==
The Green Sea post office was established 15 Feb 1870, and after a decade of being discontinued and reestablished multiple times, Richard C. Powell was appointed postmaster 8 Nov 1880, and changed the name to Powellville. The post office remained Powellville until 18 Jun 1902, when the post office changed back to Green Sea.

John P. Derham House, listed on the National Register of Historic Places in 2005, is located in Green Sea.

== Demographics ==
Historical population
Census	Pop.	Note	%±
2020	105		—
U.S. Decennial Census; 2020

Green Sea first appeared as a census designated place in the 2020 U.S. census.

=== 2020 census ===
Green Sea CDP, South Carolina – Demographic Profile (NH = Non-Hispanic)
Race / Ethnicity	Pop 2020	% 2020
White alone (NH)	64	60.95%
Black or African American alone (NH)	36	34.29%
Native American or Alaska Native alone (NH)	0	0.00%
Asian alone (NH)	0	0.00%
Pacific Islander alone (NH)	0	0.00%
Some Other Race alone (NH)	1	0.95%
Mixed Race/Multi-Racial (NH)	2	1.90%
Hispanic or Latino (any race)	2	1.90%
Total	105	100.00%

Note: the US Census treats Hispanic/Latino as an ethnic category. This table excludes Latinos from the racial categories and assigns them to a separate category. Hispanics/Latinos can be of any race.

== Transportation ==
Green Sea owns an airport whose FAA LID is S79.

== Education ==
Horry County School District is the sole school district in the county.

Green Sea has a public library, a branch of the Horry County Memorial Library.
