= J.W. Holliday Jr. House =

Historic house in South Carolina, United States

- J. W. Holliday Jr. House
- U.S. National Register of Historic Places
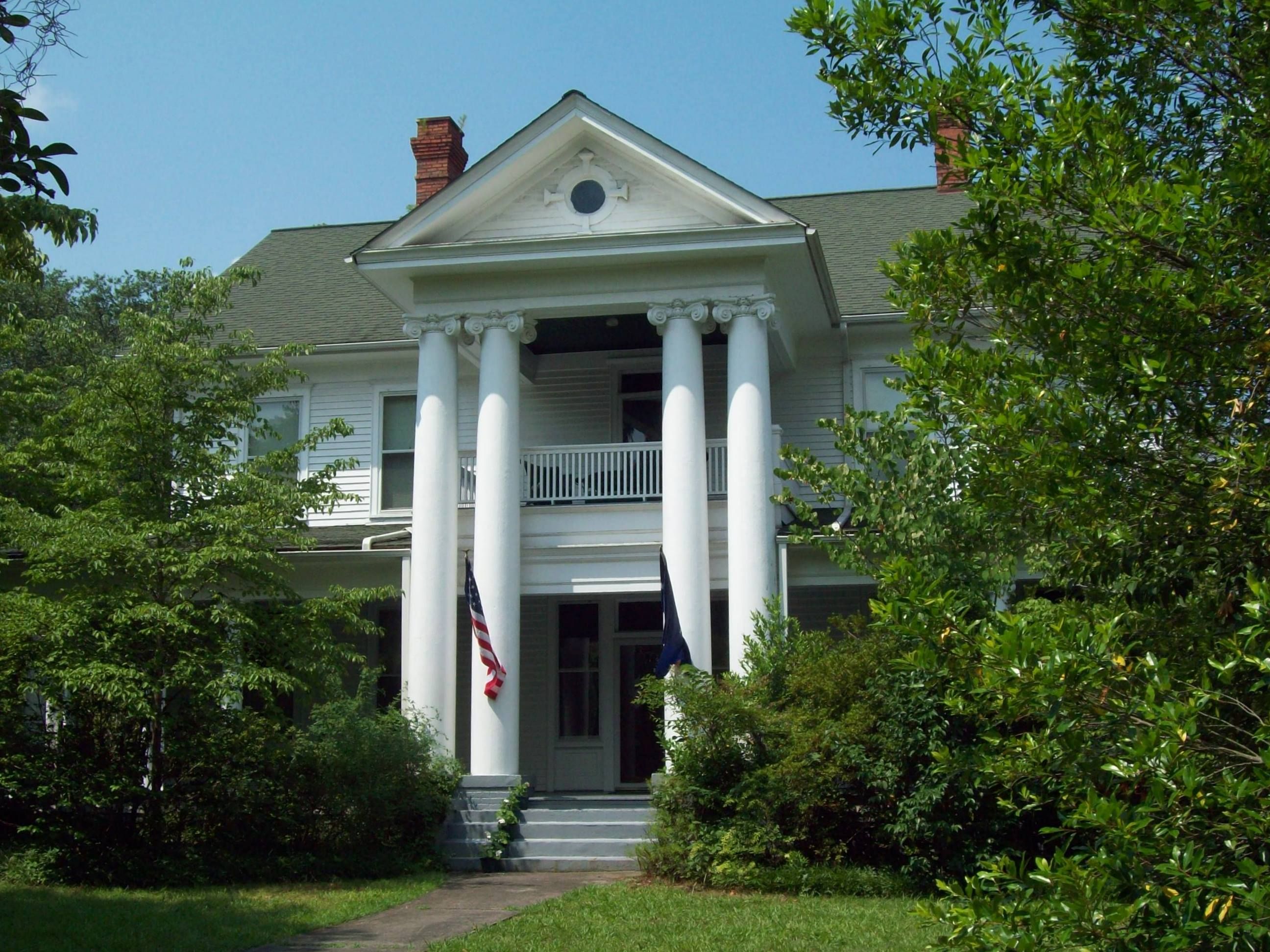
- J.W. Holliday Jr. House, June 2010

- Location within South Carolina Location within the United States
- Location: 701 Laurel St., Conway, South Carolina
- Coordinates: 33°50′22″N 79°3′4″W
- Area: 0.6 acres (0.24 ha)
- Built: 1910
- Architectural style: Beaux Arts
- MPS: Conway MRA
- NRHP reference No.: 86002227
- Added to NRHP: August 5, 1986

J. W. Holliday Jr. House is a historic home located at Conway in Horry County, South Carolina. It was built in 1910, and is a two-story, rectangular, side-gable, frame, weatherboard-clad residence. It is dominated by a pedimented Beaux-Arts style portico with giant paired Ionic order columns.

It was listed on the National Register of Historic Places in 1986.
