= C.P. Quattlebaum House =

Historic house in South Carolina, United States

- C. P. Quattlebaum House
- U.S. National Register of Historic Places
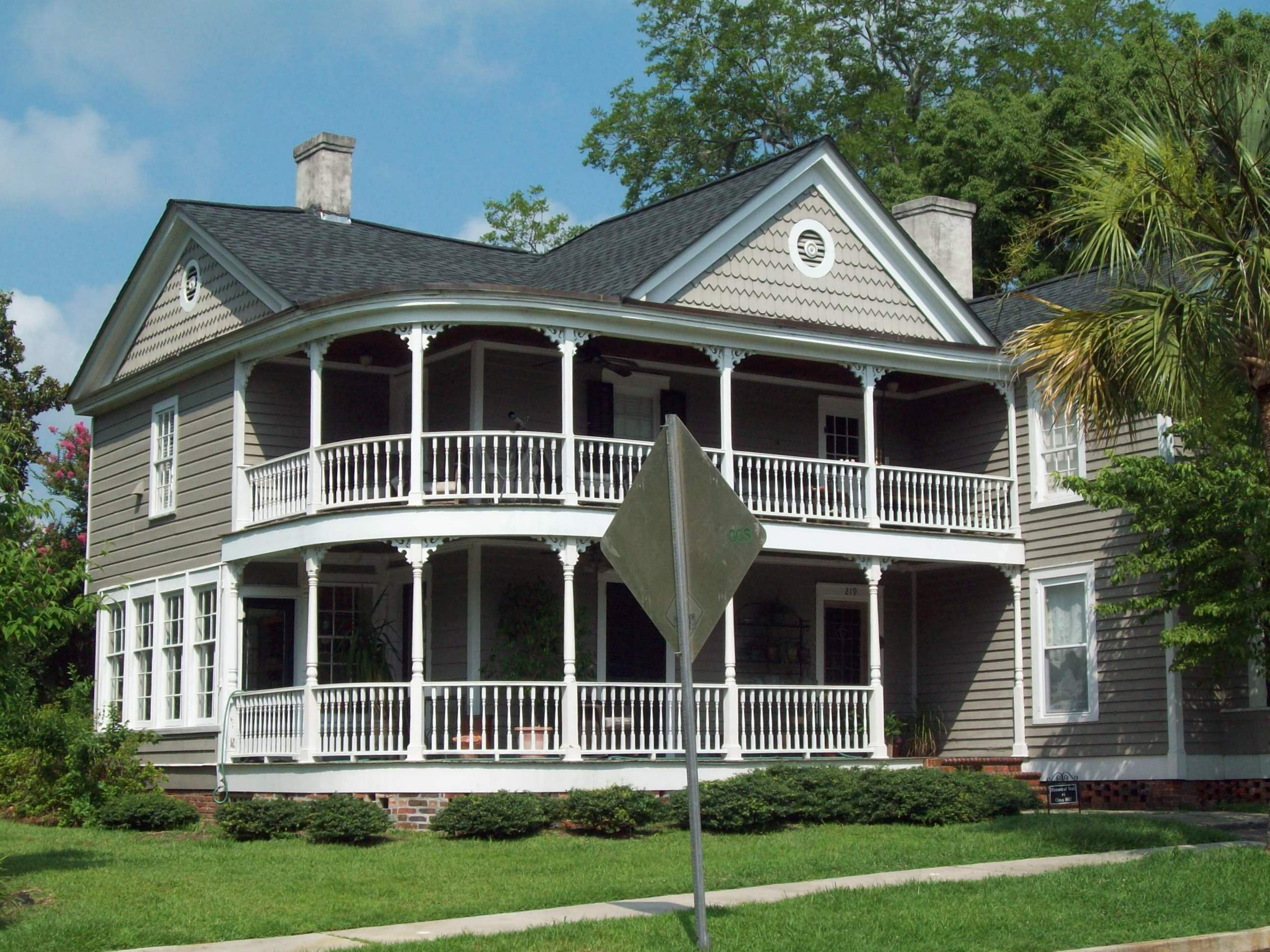
- C.P. Quattlebaum House, June 2010

- Location within South Carolina Location within the United States
- Location: 219 Kingston St., Conway, South Carolina
- Coordinates: 33°50′6″N 79°2′42″W
- Area: 0.5 acres (0.20 ha)
- Built: 1855
- MPS: Conway MRA
- NRHP reference No.: 86002233
- Added to NRHP: August 5, 1986

C.P. Quattlebaum House is a historic home located at Conway in Horry County, South Carolina. It was built in 1807. It is a two-story, "T"-plan, cross-gable roofed, frame, weatherboard-clad residence. It features a two-story, projecting, polygonal bay and two-tiered wrap around porch with sawn brackets. Its owner, Cephas Perry Quattlebaum, served as Conway's first mayor and his office is located nearby, the C.P. Quattlebaum Office.

It was listed on the National Register of Historic Places in 1986.
