= Burroughs School (Conway, South Carolina) =

- U.S. National Register of Historic Places
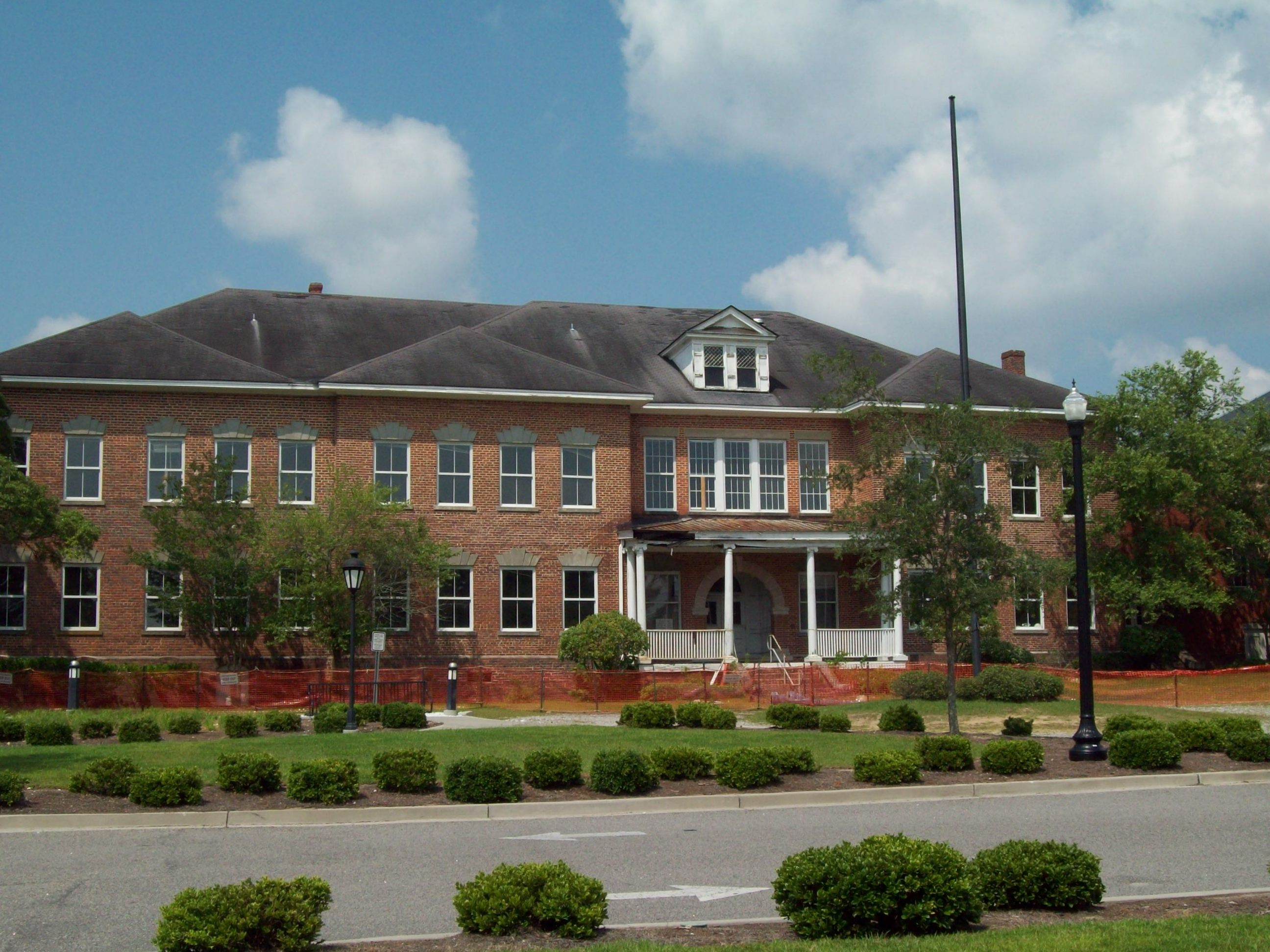
- Burroughs School, 1905 Building, June 2010

- Location within South Carolina Location within the United States
- Location: 801 Main St., Conway, South Carolina
- Coordinates: 33°50′30″N 79°3′7″W
- Area: 3 acres (1.2 ha)
- Built: 1905; 121 years ago
- Architect: Multiple
- Architectural style: Colonial Revival, Georgian Revival
- NRHP reference No.: 84002047
- Added to NRHP: August 2, 1984

Burroughs School, also known as Burroughs Graded School, is a historic school located at Conway in Horry County, South Carolina, United States. It was built in three phases between 1905 and 1923. The earliest portion of the building was built as an elementary school and has three main portions of eleven bays. It features a one-story, hip roof porch supported by six Ionic order columns with Scamozzi capitals. About 1915 a two-story hipped classroom wing was added and in 1923 four classrooms and an auditorium was added to the complex.

In 2014 the Horry County Museum moved into the renovated building from its former location in the historic Conway Post Office building.

It was listed on the National Register of Historic Places in 1984.

== Horry County Museum ==
The Horry County Museum features exhibits about the County's history, pre-history and natural history. Displays include a freshwater aquarium, mounted animals, area military history, Native American artifacts and history, textiles, area beaches, and historic photographs.

== Gallery ==
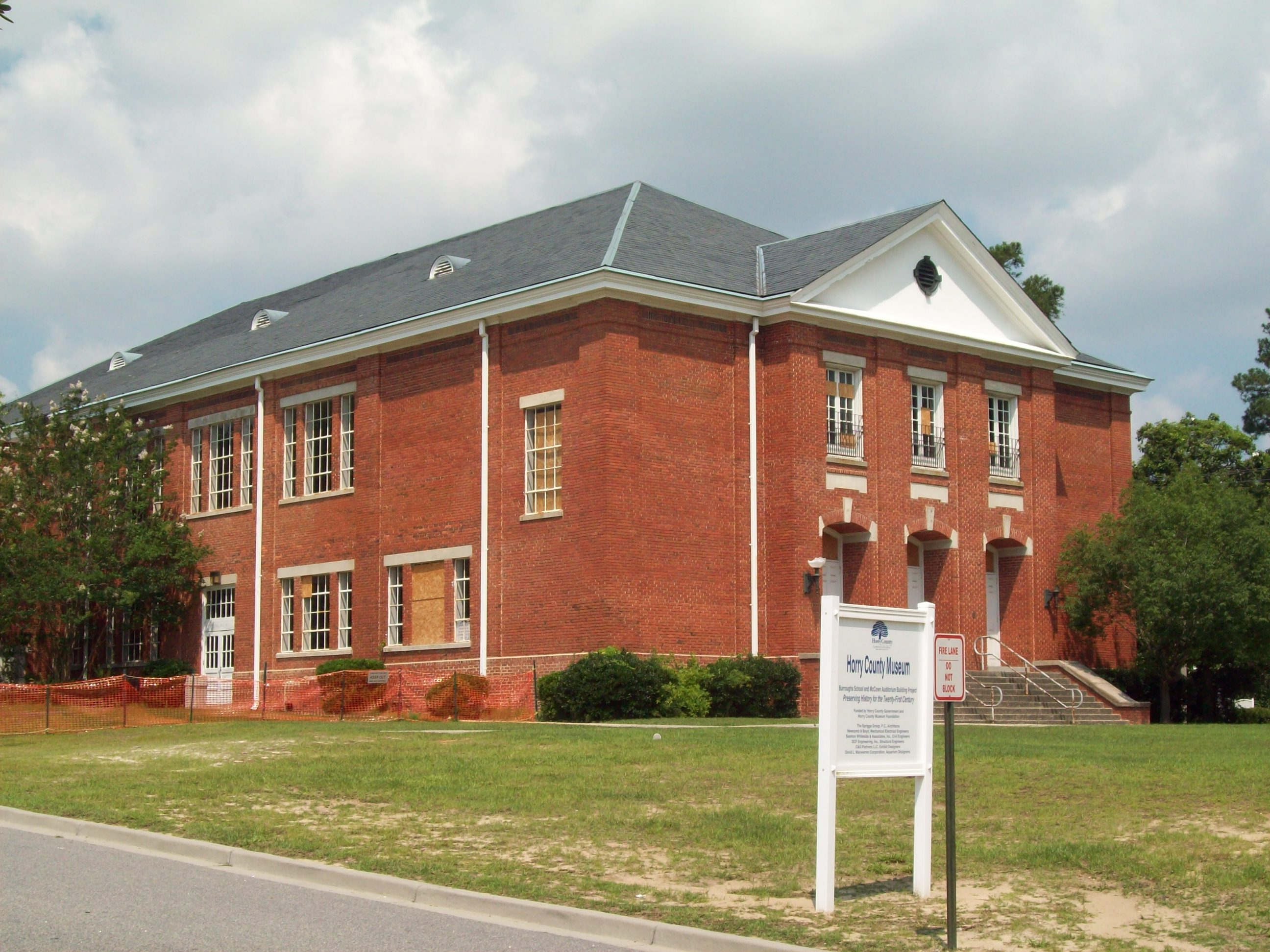
1915 Addition
