= W. H. Winborne House =

Historic house in South Carolina, United States

- U.S. National Register of Historic Places
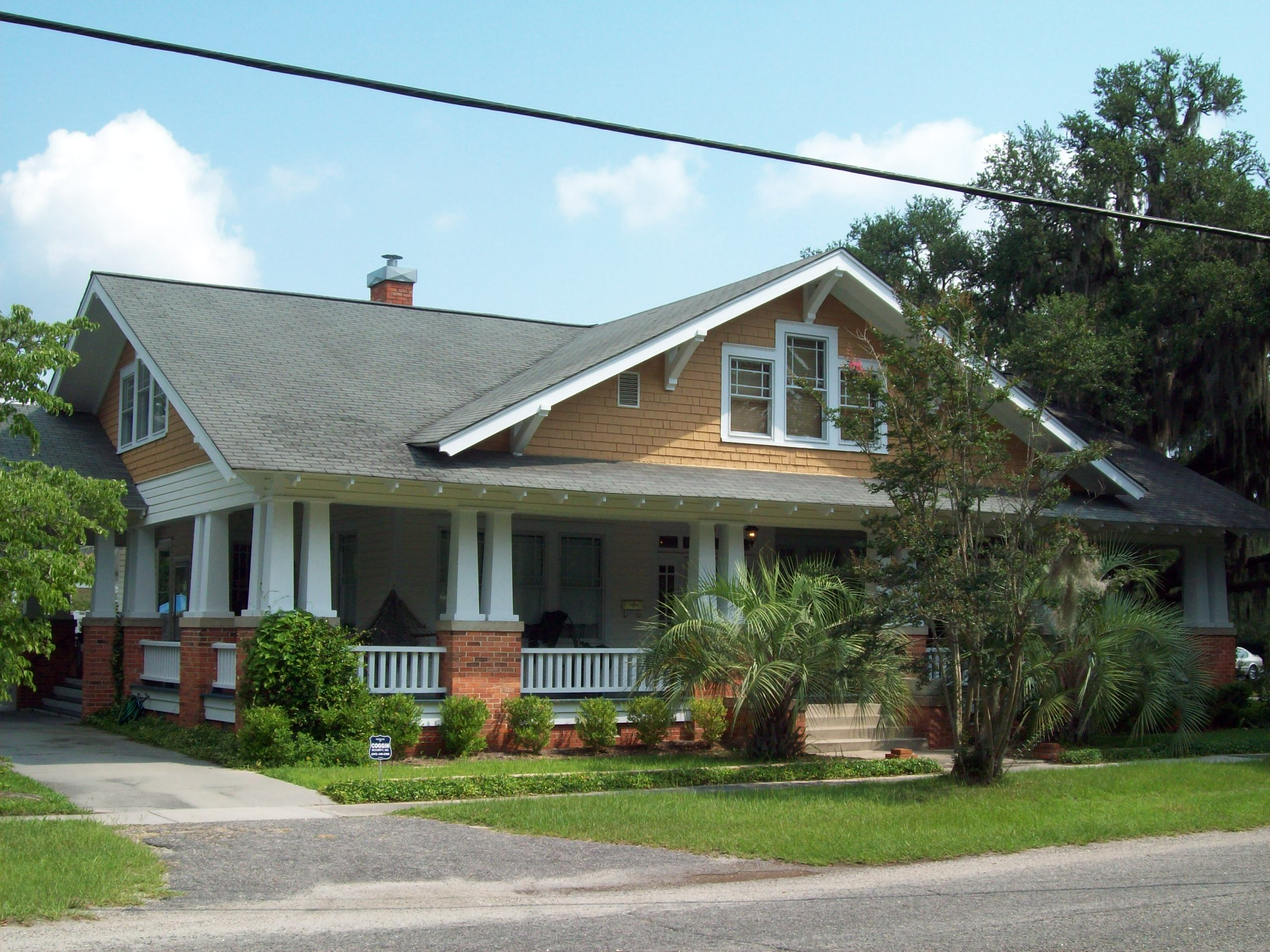
- W. H. Winborne House, June 2010

- Location within South Carolina Location within the United States
- Location: 1300 Sixth Ave., Conway, South Carolina
- Coordinates: 33°50′11″N 79°3′7″W
- Area: 0.4 acres (0.16 ha)
- Built: 1925
- Architectural style: Bungalow/Craftsman
- MPS: Conway MRA
- NRHP reference No.: 86002268
- Added to NRHP: August 5, 1986

W. H. Winborne House is a historic home located at Conway in Horry County, South Carolina. It was built about 1925 and is a brick 1 1/2-story, rectangular plan, cross-gable-roofed American Craftsman-style residence. The façade features a broad peaked gable over an integral porch which wraps three sides.

It was listed on the National Register of Historic Places in 1986.
