= Beaty-Little House =

Historic house in South Carolina, United States

- U.S. National Register of Historic Places
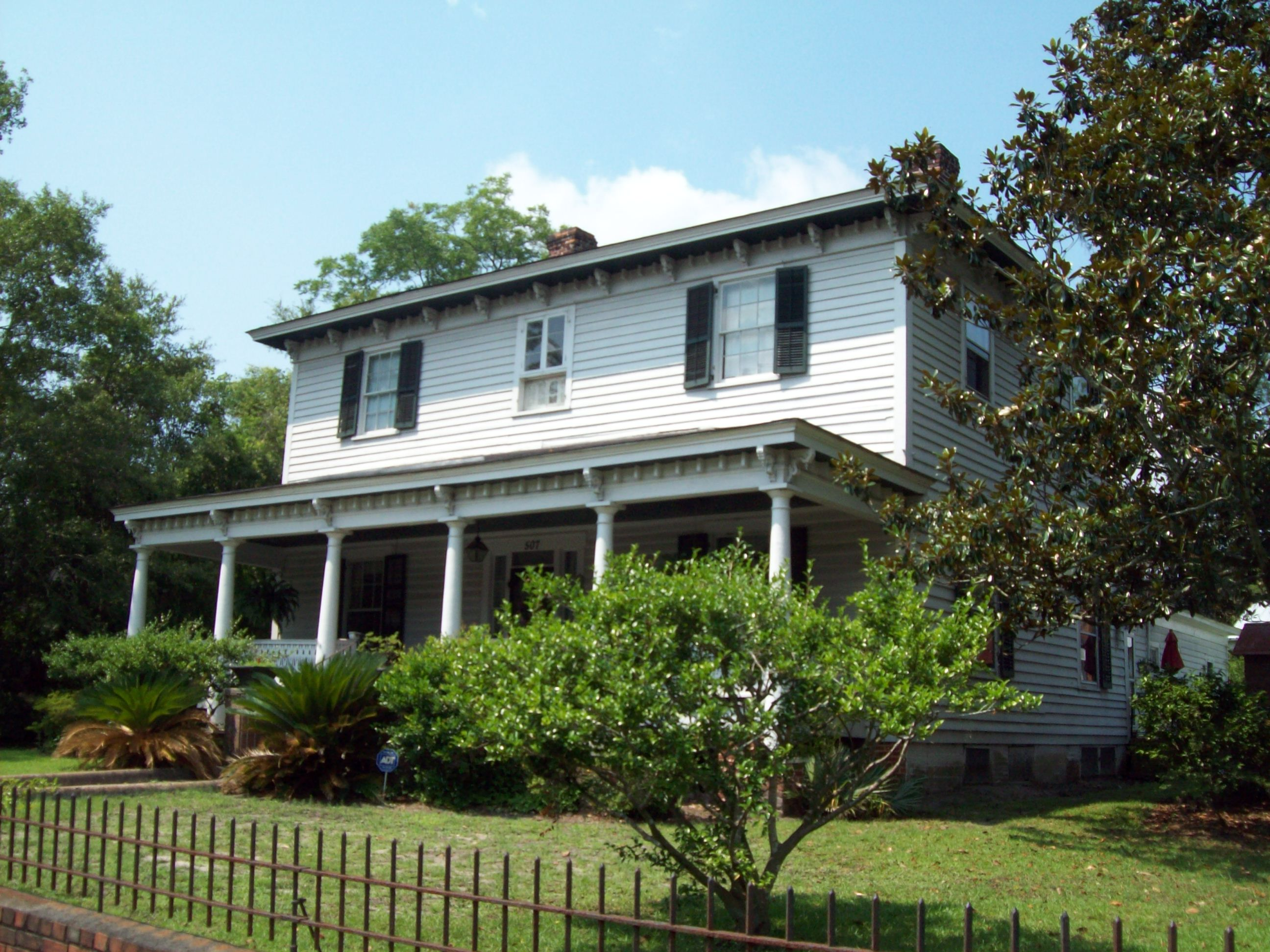
- Beaty-Little House, June 2010

- Location within South Carolina Location within the United States
- Location: 507 Main St., Conway, South Carolina
- Coordinates: 33°50′18″N 79°2′56″W
- Area: 0.6 acres (0.24 ha)
- Built: 1855
- MPS: Conway MRA
- NRHP reference No.: 86002220
- Added to NRHP: August 5, 1986

Beaty-Little House is an historic home located at Conway in Horry County, South Carolina. It was built about 1855 and is a two-story, rectangular, central hall plan residence with a hipped roof and two interior brick chimneys. It features a full-width, hipped-roof porch across the front façade with freestanding Tuscan-influenced columns and an elaborately sawn balustrade.

It was listed on the National Register of Historic Places in 1986.
