= C.P. Quattlebaum Office =

- U.S. National Register of Historic Places
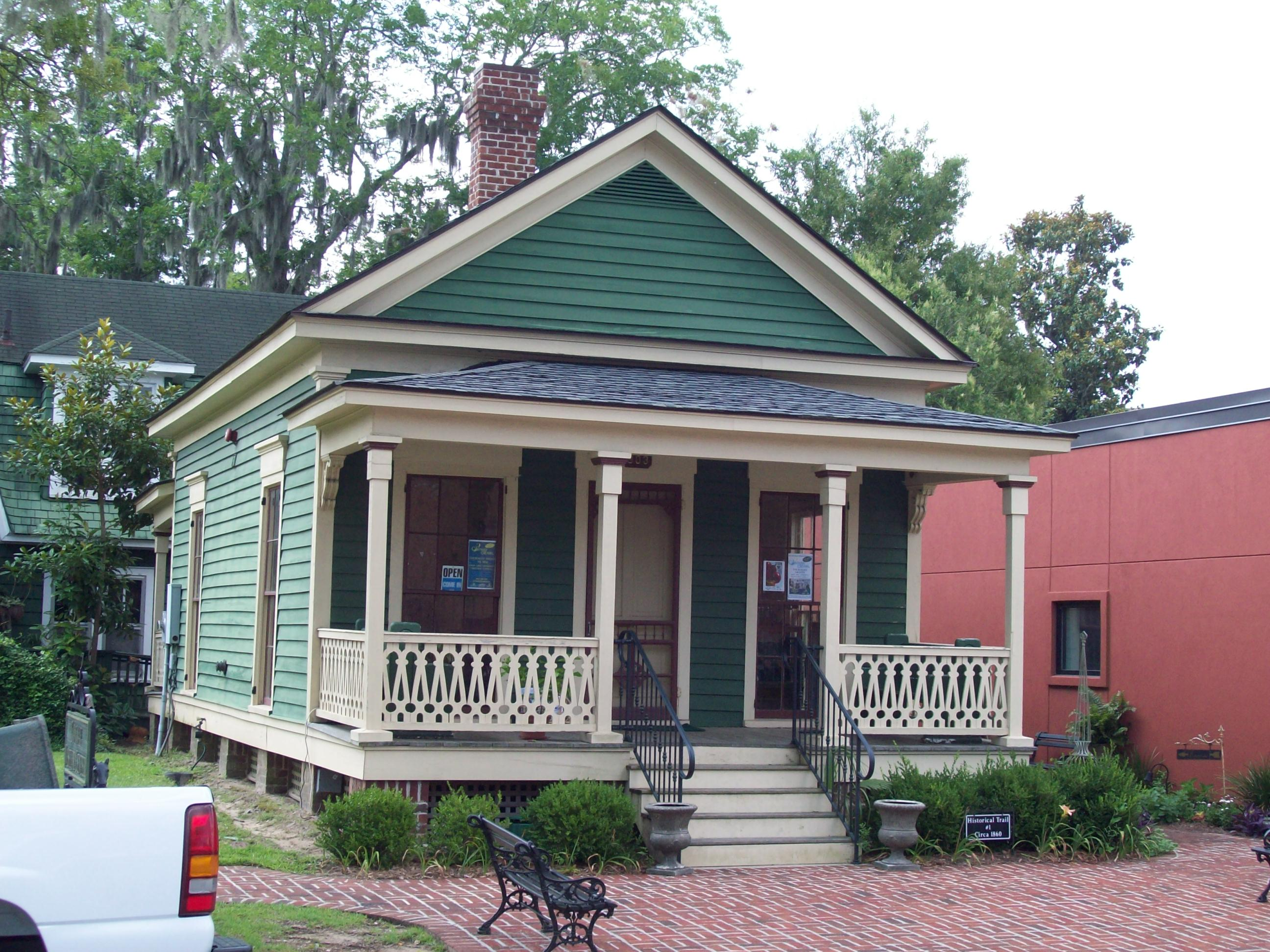
- C.P. Quattlebaum Office, June 2010

- Location within South Carolina Location within the United States
- Location: 903 Third Ave., Conway, South Carolina
- Coordinates: 33°50′7″N 79°2′44″W
- Area: 0.1 acres (0.040 ha)
- Built: ca. 1860
- MPS: Conway MRA
- NRHP reference No.: 86002235
- Added to NRHP: August 5, 1986

The C.P. Quattlebaum Office is a historic law office building located in Conway, Horry County, South Carolina. It was built around 1860 as a residence. It served as a law office for Johnson, Johnson, and Quattlebaum from 1876 to 1929. It also housed the first bank in town, The Bank of Conway, from 1893 to 1899. It was moved to its present location around 1900.

It is a rectangular, front-gabled, one-room-wide, and two-room-deep weatherboard-clad building. The façade features a three bay, hipped roof porch supported by square posts. Its owner, Cephas Perry Quattlebaum, served as Conway's first mayor, and his residence is located nearby, the C.P. Quattlebaum House. The building now serves as the Conway Visitor Center.

It was listed on the National Register of Historic Places in 1986.
