= Kingston Presbyterian Church (Conway, South Carolina) =

Historic site in Horry County, South Carolina

- U.S. National Register of Historic Places
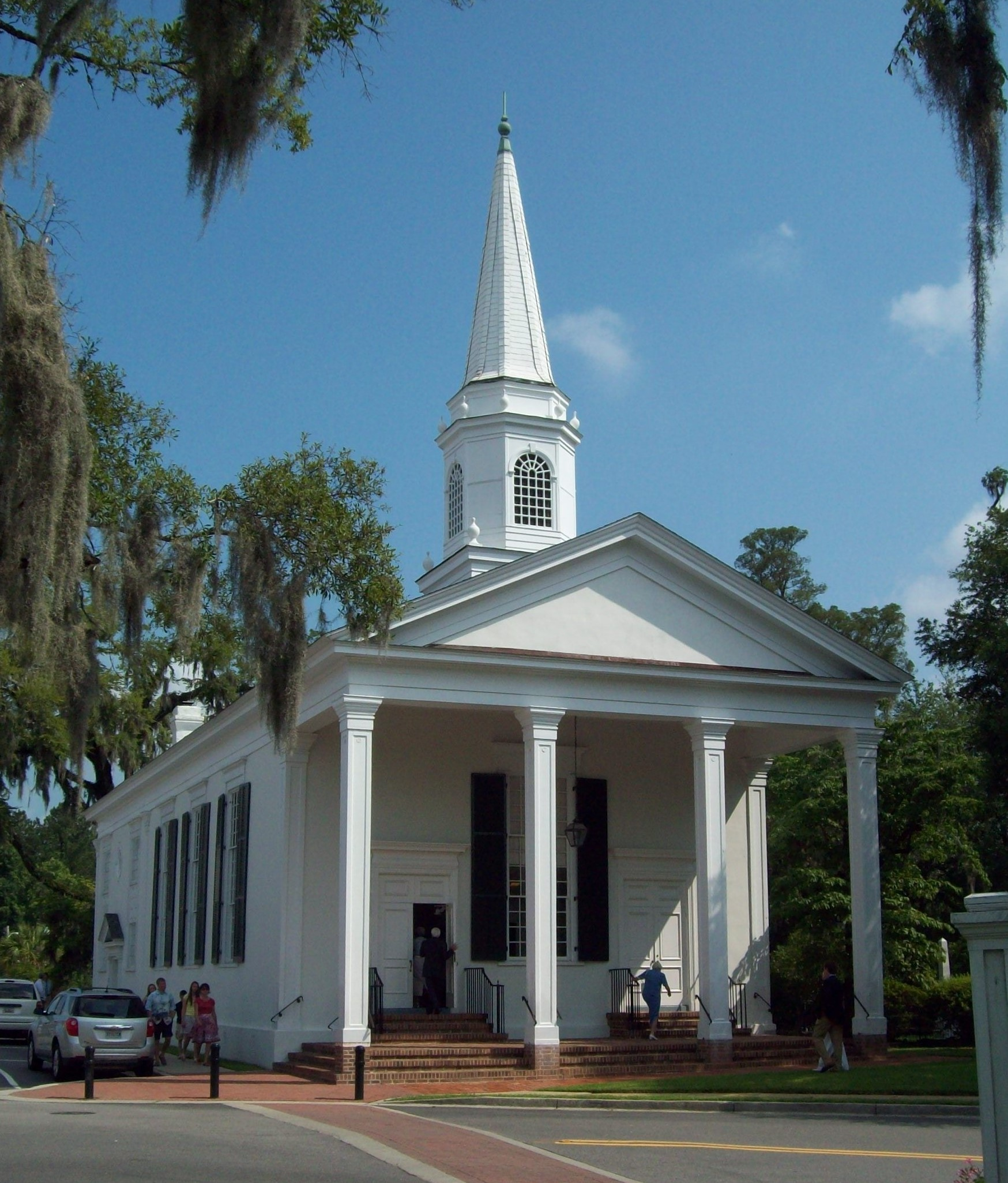
- Kingston Presbyterian Church, June 2010

- Location within South Carolina Location within the United States
- Location: 800 3rd Avenue, Conway, South Carolina
- Coordinates: 33°50′09″N 79°02′42″W
- Area: 1.6 acres (0.65 ha)
- Built: 1858, 1956
- Architect: Eaton, Otis; Charles C. Benton and Sons (Wilson, N.C.); Harper, Walter D.; Little, Henry Pyle
- Architectural style: Greek Revival, Colonial Revival
- NRHP reference No.: 08000759
- Added to NRHP: September 28, 2009

Kingston Presbyterian Church is a historic Presbyterian church located at Conway in Horry County, South Carolina. The sanctuary was built in 1858 and is an outstanding example of antebellum Greek Revival ecclesiastical design. The three-bay façade features a portico set on square columns with recessed panels and square pilasters. It was originally sheathed with weatherboard, but was covered in stucco in 1930 when a stuccoed brick addition was added to the rear. Also on the property is a Colonial Revival style brick educational building built in 1956. It is co-located with the Kingston Presbyterian Church Cemetery, listed on the National Register of Historic Places in 1986.

It was listed on the National Register of Historic Places in 2009.

== Gallery ==
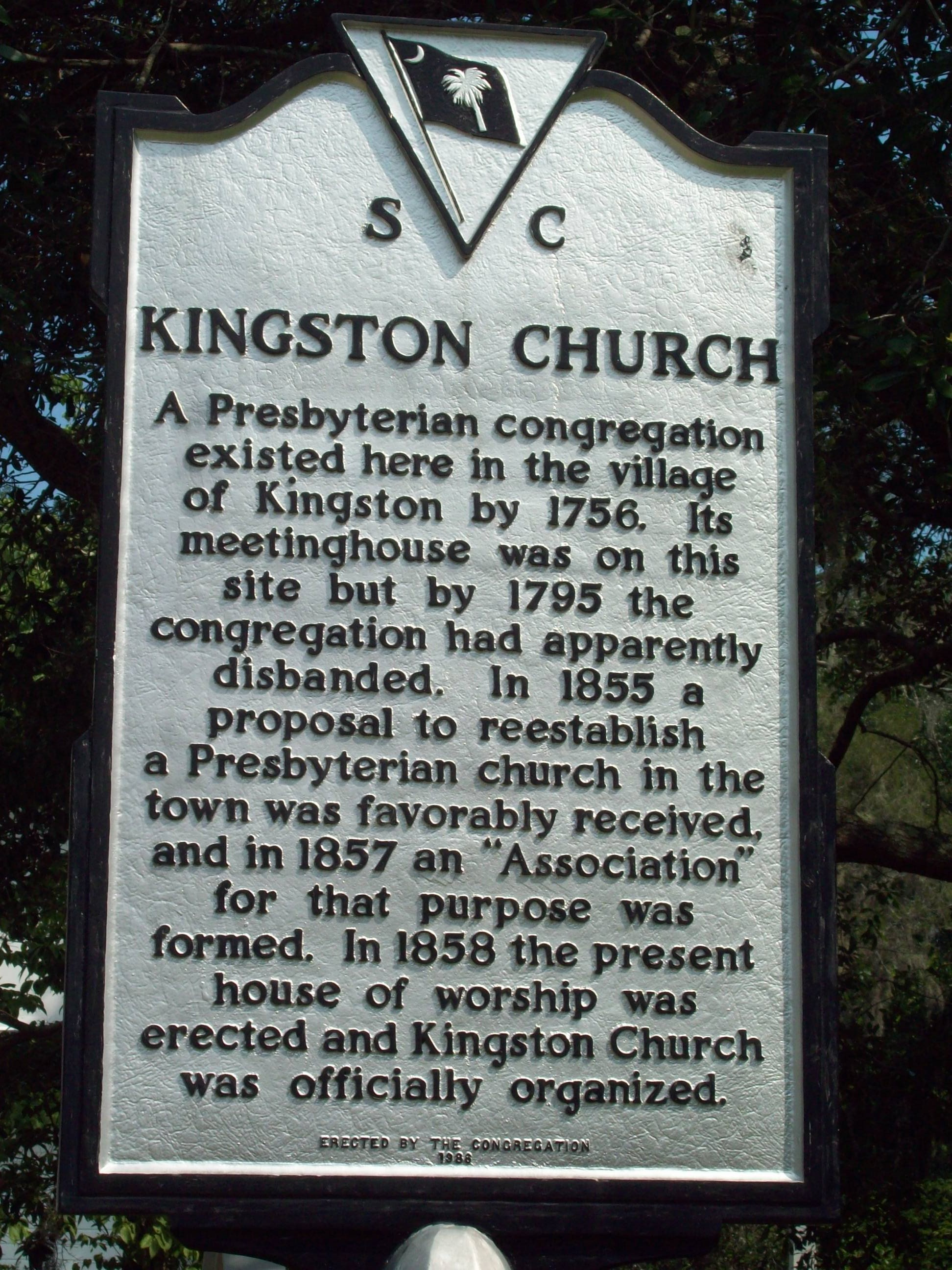
