= Interstate 73 in South Carolina =

Highway in South Carolina

Future Interstate 73
- Section of SC 22 to become part of I-73 highlighted in blue, unconstructed section highlighted in orange

Route information
- Maintained by SCDOT

Location
- Country: United States
- State: South Carolina

Highway system
- Interstate Highway System; Main; Auxiliary; Suffixed; Business; Future; South Carolina State Highway System; Interstate; US; State; Scenic
← SC 72	→ SC 75

Interstate 73 (I-73) is the designation for a future Interstate Highway in the US state of South Carolina. When completed, it will connect the Grand Strand area with the state's Interstate system.

== History ==
In the 1980s, Ashby Ward of the Myrtle Beach Area Chamber of Commerce suggested that Representative John Light Napier ask the federal government to study an Interstate Highway to Myrtle Beach. Napier, who knew traffic was already a problem in the area, persuaded President Ronald Reagan to provide funding for studies.

Authorized by the Intermodal Surface Transportation Efficiency Act of 1991 (ISTEA), I-73 was established as a north–south high-priority corridor from Charleston, South Carolina, to Detroit, Michigan.

Before the planning of I-73, there was discussion of extending I-20 to Myrtle Beach from the city of Florence after the route was completed in 1976 to its current eastern terminus at I-95 in Florence. Since the city of Florence is only about 60 miles (97 km) away from the beach, it was discussed that it would be cheaper to extend I-20 to the beach, rather than build I-73. I-20 would follow the US 76 and SC 576 corridors eastward to Marion, then from there using the US 501 and SC 22 corridors southward to Myrtle Beach. This extension was planned to benefit economy that could connect the businesses from Atlanta and Dallas-Fort Worth to Myrtle Beach. However, SCDOT declined the plan, saying that the extension of I-20 made sense on a map, but extending I-73 from the northern states and Canada would benefit the economy more than extending I-20.

In 1993, the proposed route through South Carolina followed US 1 and US 52 to Florence, with 73 miles (117 km) of new road in Marion and Horry counties, and following US 17 from North Myrtle Beach to Charleston.

When I-73 crossed a border between two states, the federal law authorizing the road required that the two states agree that their sections meet. Originally, both Carolinas selected a route running south from Rockingham, North Carolina. However, North Carolina had more money to spend on roads, and, on May 10, 1995, the US Senate Environment and Public Works Committee approved North Carolina's plan for I-73 to run eastward to the coast and enter South Carolina at North Myrtle Beach. Later that year, officials in both states agreed that I-73 would enter South Carolina south of Rockingham and that the other highway would be I-74. This raised the possibility of I-73 bypassing the Myrtle Beach area entirely since I-74 would run to the Myrtle Beach area.

In May 1997, signs went up declaring the "Future Corridor" in Bennettsville, Marion, Conway, and Charleston. At this point, the highway was expected to run 122 miles (196 km), 67 (108) of which were already four lanes. The route included US 1, SC 9, SC 38, and US 501, with a planned Conway bypass connecting to US 701, along which the highway would connect with US 17 on the way to Charleston.

At one point, South Carolina intended to have stop lights and driveways on I-73, but the National Highway System Designation Act, passed in 1995, required I-73 to be built to Interstate standards. Residents of McClellanville on US 17 protested, and alternative routes would bypass Georgetown, leading to the possibility of Myrtle Beach also being bypassed. People in Georgetown, wanting the highway to serve their port, asked that I-73 end in their community, but federal law still said Charleston would be the terminus.

In 1998, Representative Mark Sanford introduced an amendment to the Transportation Equity Act for the 21st Century (TEA-21) that changed the southern terminus of I-73 to Georgetown. However, the section between Myrtle Beach and Georgetown would not be part of I-73; instead, it would be a "high-priority corridor" along US 701. That same year, the South Carolina Department of Transportation (SCDOT) Commission endorsed a plan that would link I-73 from Georgetown through Conway, Marion, Bennettsville, and Wallace, to the North Carolina state line. In 2003, the South Carolina General Assembly approved a resolution asking that the Conway Bypass (SC 22) be designated as I-73 which changed the southern terminus from Georgetown to Briarcliffe Acres.

In 2003, SCDOT went through a series of public meetings and came up with five routes:

1. New construction parallel to SC 9.
2. Convert SC 22 and create new construction parallel north of US 501 and SC 38.
3. Convert SC 22, US 501, and SC 38.
4. New construction parallel south of SC 22, US 501, and SC 38.
5. Convert SC 22, US 501, SC 576, US 76/US 301, and SC 327 and build new construction toward Bennettsville.

In late 2003, the state decided to go with option three and started environmental impact studies in 2004. In February 2005, North and South Carolina made an agreement on the location of I-73's state crossing, which will parallel east of SC 38. Part of the agreement was that SCDOT would develop and construct the short section into North Carolina, while the North Carolina Department of Transportation (NCDOT) would construct a connector route to the Carolina Bays Parkway (SC 31) from North Carolina. By the end of 2006, what originally was planned to be "option three" became "option two" after a series of public meetings and completion of the impact studies; this was confirmed in 2007 with the northern half of I-73 (from I-95 to the North Carolina state line). A final decision on the preferred northern route was announced on July 19, 2007. The central route caused the least disruption to homes, farms, and wetlands.

On May 30, 2006, SCDOT announced its preferred routing of I-73 between Myrtle Beach and I-95. I-73 will begin where SC 22 starts at US 17 near Briarcliffe Acres. It will then proceed northwest, crossing the proposed routing of I-74 (currently SC 31, the Carolina Bays Parkway). After passing Conway, I-73 will leave SC 22 at a new interchange to be constructed two miles (3.2 km) west of US 701 and will then use a new highway to be built between SC 22 and SC 917 north of Cool Spring. I-73 will then use an upgraded SC 917 to cross the Little Pee Dee River. It will then proceed on a new freeway alignment between SC 917 and I-95 that would have an interchange with US 76 west of Mullins and then would proceed northwest to an exit with US 501 near Latta, passing that city to the south before intersecting I-95 near SC 38.

In February 2008, the record of decision (ROD) for the final environmental impact statement (EIS) for the section of I-73 from I-95 to SC 22 was signed. An October 22, 2008, ceremony marked the signing of the ROD for the section from the North Carolina state line to I-95.

The state asked for $300 million (equivalent to $420 million in 2024) in Transportation Investment Generating Economic Recovery (TIGER) grant money for the interchange at I-95 and 11 miles (18 km) of I-73. In February 2010, the federal government announced the state would receive $10 million (equivalent to $14 million in 2024). On April 21, 2011, SCDOT voted to spend $105 million (equivalent to $144 million in 2024) on the interchange, which was expected to cost $150 million (equivalent to $210 million in 2024), including a six-mile (9.7 km) section of I-73. Supporters called it "The Interchange of Hope", while opponents called it "The Interchange to Nowhere". On September 15, 2011, South Carolina road commissioners approved an $11.5-million (equivalent to $15.5 million in 2024) plan to rebuild a bridge in Dillon County, near Latta.

On November 7, 2011, Myrtle Beach city council member Wayne Gray asked area elected officials to consider using Horry County Road Improvement and Development Effort (RIDE) funds to pay for a portion of I-73.

In June 2012, Miley and Associates of Columbia recommended improvements to SC 38 and US 501 to create the Grand Strand Expressway (GSX), a position long held by the Coastal Conservation League, which asked for the study. South Carolina Representative Alan D. Clemmons, head of the National I-73 Corridor Association, said such a plan had been considered but was not likely. Nancy Cave of the Coastal Conservation League reiterated support for upgrading SC 38 and US 501, along with US 521 and SC 9, after results of a new study were presented at an August 1, 2012, meeting of the Myrtle Beach Area Chamber of Commerce. The study claimed that 90,000 people could leave the area 10 hours faster in an evacuation with I-73 and Southern Evacuation Lifeline (SELL) both in place.

On June 20, 2017, Representative for South Carolina's 7th congressional district Tom Rice announced the Army Corps of Engineers issued a permit allowing for the construction of South Carolina's portion of I-73 from the North Carolina state line to Myrtle Beach. After the announcement, SCDOT's Transportation Commission chairperson Woody Willard of Spartanburg said "I-73 is important for economic development and safety, as a quicker way to evacuate people from the Grand Strand when a hurricane approaches. But the commission will not designate any state money toward the project unless the Legislature passes a law requiring it."

Interest in I-73 was renewed in early 2021 due in part to the announcement of the American Jobs Plan. Two years later in September 2023, SCDOT announced that Phase I of the project, which would connect I-95 in Dillon County to US 501 south of Latta, would be "shovel ready" by the new year. They also announced that they had begun right-of-way purchasing within Horry County from the Little Pee Dee River to the eventual connecting point for I-73 and SC 22. However, South Carolina Governor Henry McMaster’s 2024 executive budget, which was released in early-January 2024, did not include any funding for building the route. He noted that although he still supports the I-73 expansion into the state, the support among county and local leaders had waned. Additionally, in April 2024, a nonprofit advocacy group called American Rivers concluded that the Little Pee Dee River ranked fifth on their Most Endangered Rivers in the U.S., stating that the construction of I-73 would "destroy wetlands and critical wildlife habitat, impact the health of the river, and exacerbate flooding for disadvantaged communities already challenged with property damage and displacement." Despite the lack of funding, Horry County still plans to work on their section of the future freeway as part of the RIDE IV program, which was approved in November 2024. In June 2024, the Horry County Council approved adding the future routing of I-73 in the county to the official county index map. Adjacent Marion County passed a resolution in 2022 supporting I-73. On February 9, 2026, SCDOT stated that it had "completed 99% of the right-of-way acquisition between I-95 and [US] 501", "completed 95% of the right-of-way acquisition" between US 501 and the Little Pee Dee River, and "[t]he right-of-way acquisition between the Little Pee Dee River and [SC] 22 [was] ongoing".

In March 2026, the South Carolina General Assembly endorsed the future name President Donald J. Trump Highway.

== Exit list ==
The exit list is following the SCDOT preferred corridor and is subject to change.

County	Location	mi	km	Exit	Destinations	Notes
Horry	Briarcliffe Acres				US 17 / Kings Road – Myrtle Beach, North Myrtle Beach	Existing interchanges of SC 22
Horry	North Myrtle Beach				SC 31 to SC 9 – Myrtle Beach, Georgetown, Wilmington	Existing interchanges of SC 22
Horry					SC 90 – Little River, Conway	Existing interchanges of SC 22
Horry					SC 905 – Longs, Conway	Existing interchanges of SC 22
Horry					US 701 – Loris, Conway	Existing interchanges of SC 22
Horry					SC 22 west to US 501 – Aynor	Future interchanges (unfunded)
Horry					S-308 - Galivants Ferry	Future interchanges (unfunded)
Marion	Mullins				US 76 – Marion, Mullins	Future interchanges (unfunded)
Marion					SC 41 Alt. – Marion, Lake View	Future interchanges (unfunded)
Dillon	Latta				US 501 – Latta, Dillon	Future interchanges (unfunded)
Dillon					I-95 to I-20 west – Florence, Columbia, Dillon, Fayetteville	Future interchanges (unfunded)
Marlboro					SC 381 – Blenheim, Clio	Future interchanges (unfunded)
Marlboro	Bennettsville				US 15 / US 401 – Bennettsville, McColl	Future interchanges (unfunded)
Marlboro					SC 79 – Gibson	Future interchanges (unfunded)
Marlboro					I-73 north – Rockingham	Future continuation into North Carolina
1.000 mi = 1.609 km; 1.000 km = 0.621 mi: Unopened

== See also ==
- Intracoastal Waterway
- Pee Dee River

Interstate 73
Previous state: Terminus	South Carolina	Next state: North Carolina
