= Southern Evacuation Lifeline =

South Carolina Highway 22 Extension Project

Route information
- Maintained by SCDOT
- Length: 28 mi (45 km)
- Existed: 2003–present

Major junctions
- South end: US 17 in Surfside Beach
- North end: US 501 / SC 22 near Conway

Location
- Country: United States
- State: South Carolina

Highway system
- South Carolina State Highway System; Interstate; US; State; Scenic

The Southern Evacuation Lifeline (SELL) is the former name of the South Carolina Highway 22 Extension Project, a proposed 28-mile (45 km) limited-access highway in Horry County, South Carolina, in the United States. As of 2010 the project was underfunded, expecting to cost around $600 million, and issues with the route itself still remain, as it would travel directly next to several wildlife preserves.

The road was proposed to bypass the congested South Carolina Highway 707, South Carolina Highway 544, and U.S. Route 501 in the event of a hurricane. It would allow a more direct route west from the southern Grand Strand, while simultaneously completing a beltway around the Myrtle Beach area as a continuation of South Carolina Highway 22.

== History ==
In 2003, a feasibility study showed several possible routes for a road to relieve congestion on major highways in Horry and Georgetown Counties, which would connect U.S. 501 and U.S. 17 by crossing the Waccamaw River.

On February 1, 2005, Horry County added the 701 Connector to the second phase of the Road Improvement and Development Effort (RIDE II), its long-term construction plan, with the intention of providing a hurricane evacuation route. Edsel "Coupe" DeVille, chairman of the Committee Advocating Road Safety that studied possible routes, said the new road would allow Surfside Beach, Garden City, and Murrells Inlet to leave in half the time. The road would run from Carolina Bays Parkway to U.S. 378, with three of the four possible routes going through the Waccamaw National Wildlife Refuge. The United States Fish and Wildlife Service did not oppose the project, but The Coastal Conservation League had opposed the road for a decade because of fears the road would damage the environment and hurt wildlife habitat for such animals as bears, birds and salamanders.

On July 29, 2005, Congress passed a $286.4 billion highway bill, with $4 million for the 701 Connector. On January 19, 2006, the South Carolina Department of Transportation allocated $1 million of state money to add to the $4 million in federal funds, and the SELL Task Force began as a result.

The road's name changed from the 701 Connector to the Southern Evacuation Lifeline, and a SELL logo was created. Hurricane Katrina gave the new task force a new incentive to act. The study area ran from the Little Pee Dee River to U.S. 501 and from U.S. 17 to beyond U.S. 378. As part of the environmental impact study, four public meetings were held starting in May 2006. Southern Environmental Law Center attorney David Farren opposed building the road across what he called "the area designated for conservation."

On February 5, 2007, SCDOT released possible routes. It was feared that some routes would cross the wildlife refuge and result in opposition and possible lawsuits from conservation groups.

SCDOT project manager Mike Barbee announced in October 2007 that the preliminary environmental impact study was to be released in February 2008. Eight routes were being considered, and after public hearings, construction was expected to begin in 2009.

On March 8, 2010, SELL committee members said making the highway a toll road would mean completion in five years. SELL would be the third toll road in the state, after the Southern Connector and Cross Island Parkway in Hilton Head Island. The road would allow residents of western Horry County as well as Georgetown County to leave more quickly in the event of an evacuation, but it would also provide faster access to hospitals. Civil Engineering Consulting Services Inc. would conduct environmental impact studies, find funding and determine where an unmanned toll booth or booths will go. Barbee pointed out that so few people use The Southern Connector that the consortium that paid for the road was in default on bond payments, but the road would likely be more successful in a tourist area. Later in March, the county approved the plan to select a company to build the road.

Nancy Cave of the Coastal Conservation League said a change in the route for Carolina Bays Parkway meant a greater desire for a bridge over the Waccamaw River, which the Coast Guard would have to approve. Cave said the changes would require a supplemental environmental impact statement.

On November 16, 2010, the Horry County Council agreed to ask the State Infrastructure Bank for $4 million that would have otherwise been used for Carolina Bays Parkway. The county's decision assumed cost savings on the parkway project.

At an August 1, 2012, meeting, the Myrtle Beach Area Chamber of Commerce showed study results that said 90,000 people could leave the area 10 hours faster in an evacuation with SELL and Interstate 73 both in place. Cave said those promoting these highways were trying to attract tourists and that upgrades of U.S. 501, S.C. 38, U.S. 521, and S.C. 9 would accomplish more for speeding evacuations.

The "I-73 Intermediate Traffic and Revenue Study" by C&M Associates, dated February 2016, was to be presented to state transportation officials March 24, 2016 and included upgrades to SC 22. RIDE III, passed in 2016, and RIDE IV, passed in 2024, also provide funding for SELL. The federal government withdrew support for the project in September 2018, but as of Summer 2022, the project was still planned and remained in the design phase. In April 2025 the Army Corps of Engineers announced its intention to create a draft environmental impact statement for the project. Public meetings were held throughout 2026, and three routes had been chosen by November 2026.
