= Road Improvement and Development Effort =

Road Improvement and Development Effort or RIDE is a plan for road projects in Horry County, South Carolina, including Carolina Bays Parkway, Veterans Highway and Robert Grissom Parkway. The first phase, costing $1.1 billion, was being paid for by hospitality taxes. Subsequent phases took effect in 2006, 2016, and 2024.

== RIDE ==
In 1996, South Carolina voters turned down a one-cent sales tax for roads, and Buck Limehouse, the state's first DOT Commission chairman, started the State Infrastructure Bank. Commission member Gary Loftus became the first chairman of RIDE, which came up with the list of Horry County projects to use money from the bank. In the years 1995 through 2002, the state completed 27 years worth of road projects at a cost of $5 billion, including the RIDE projects. The Fantasy Harbour Bridge, opened in July 2009, was the last RIDE project.

A 2.5 percent accommodations tax and a 1.5 percent prepared foods tax fund projects in the first phase of RIDE. Three-fifths of the tax went to RIDE projects, with the remainder for public safety, public works and infrastructure relating to tourism. On May 2, 2017, the Horry County Council voted to continue collecting the 1.5 percent hospitality fee first passed in 1996 and scheduled to end in 2019. Supporters of keeping the fee wanted to use revenues for Interstate 73.

On November 7, 2011, Myrtle Beach city council member Wayne Gray asked area elected officials to consider using RIDE funds to pay for a portion of I-73. One possibility was to continue the RIDE I tax past 2023.

== RIDE II ==
The Horry County Council created the RIDE II Committee on April 17, 2001. It included 11 voting members plus the chairman of the S.C. DOT. The committee's purpose is to advise the county and state of road needs, study funding methods, and review projects under construction.

The original list of projects included the northern section of Carolina Bays Parkway but did not provide funding for the southern section. The first list for RIDE 2 released in April 2006 included 10 projects. After the approval of a one-cent sales tax on November 7, 2006, the list included 15 projects totalling $425 million. The biggest of these were an interchange on U.S. Highway 17 next to the former Myrtle Beach Air Force Base, the widening of S.C. 707, and a bypass for Aynor. Also included was the paving of International Drive from Robert Grissom Parkway to S.C. 90, providing an alternate route to Carolina Forest.

The One-Cent Capital Projects Sales Tax began on May 1, 2007, intended to last up to seven years, generating $425,307,500; if the tax produced that amount before the seven years end, it was to be dropped.

Nine of 15 RIDE II projects were under way or finished as a groundbreaking was held November 6, 2013, for the final section of Carolina Bays Parkway and the S.C. 707 widening. Collection of the tax ended April 30, 2014, but RIDE III was already being planned.

== RIDE III ==
In March 2016, the RIDE III Sales Tax Commission completed a list of 20 projects to be funded by another one-cent tax. The projects on the list totalled $592 million. The Horry County Council voted June 8 to let voters decide on the sales tax in November 2016, which they did. Collection of the tax began May 1, 2017, and surplus funds from RIDE II would also be used.

== RIDE IV ==
RIDE IV was outlined in a county budget retreat in December 2021. At that time, it was expected projects would be selected by 2024. Voters approved the sales tax on November 5, 2024.
