= Robert Edge Parkway =

Highway in South Carolina, United States

- Main Street Connector; North Myrtle Beach Connector

Route information
- Length: 2.30 mi (3.70 km)
- Existed: 2009–present

Major junctions
- South end: US 17 / Main Street in North Myrtle Beach
- SC 31 in North Myrtle Beach
- North end: SC 90 in North Myrtle Beach

Location
- Country: United States
- State: South Carolina
- Counties: Horry County

Highway system
- South Carolina State Highway System; Interstate; US; State; Scenic

Robert Edge Parkway is a connection highway in North Myrtle Beach, South Carolina. It begins at U.S. Route 17 (US 17) and Main Street, crosses the Intracoastal Waterway, has an interchange with South Carolina Highway 31 (SC 31) or the Carolina Bays Parkway, and terminates at an intersection with SC 90. The project consisted of upgrading Firetower Road, adding a new interchange for SC 31, expanding Main Street in North Myrtle Beach to accommodate the increase in traffic, and a 1,000-foot bridge (300 m) over the Intracoastal Waterway which includes a 10-foot-wide path (3.0 m) for walkers and bicycles. Formerly known as the Main Street Connector, the road has been named for Robert Edge Sr., the first mayor of North Myrtle Beach starting in 1968. For twelve years before that, Edge was the mayor of Crescent Beach, one of the four towns which, through Edge's efforts, became North Myrtle Beach. The road opened September 3, 2009.

The road is maintained by the South Carolina Department of Transportation (SCDOT) and officially part of, but not signed as, South Carolina Highway 31 Connector.

== Route description ==
The highway begins at the intersection of US 17 which is the main commercial drag through North Myrtle Beach and Main Street which provides direct access to Ocean Drive (SC 65). The parkway, with two lanes in each direction and a multi-use trail off the northbound side, begins towards the north and passes between two residential neighborhoods with tall sound barriers lining the road. It climbs a hill to cross the Intracoastal Waterway and exit the city of North Myrtle Beach. As it passes through an unincorporated area of Horry County, the road begins to curve to the west and intersects Old Sanders Drive, an access road to another residential neighborhood. It curves back to the north where it reenters North Myrtle Beach and has an interchange with SC 31. At the next traffic light following the interchange, the parkway ends at an intersection with SC 90 which heads towards Little River and Wampee. Another fork of this intersection is Champions Boulevard which is the entrance to the North Myrtle Beach Park and Sports Complex.

== History ==
The 1995 Comprehensive Plan of the City of North Myrtle Beach included a second access to the planned road that became known as Carolina Bays Parkway.

In February 2001, Horry County officials voted to ask the State Infrastructure Bank for $173 million for Carolina Bays Parkway, a connector from the parkway to North Myrtle Beach, and a bridge over the Intracoastal Waterway at Fantasy Harbour.

The Infrastructure Bank chose not to provide money for the projects at that time, but did approve $135 million in December 2001.

On October 15, 2002, state highway officials approved $63 million for the "Main Street Connector" and the Fantasy Harbour bridge.

Also in 2002, Horry County representatives in the South Carolina State House introduced a resolution to designate SC 22 as Interstate 73, SC 31 as Interstate 74, and the North Myrtle Beach Connector as Interstate 174. However, at that time officials in Wilmington, North Carolina believed I-74 would end there, meaning I-174 could not be in North Myrtle Beach.

SCDOT scheduled a public hearing for May 1, 2003. At its public hearings, the SCDOT used MicroStation V8 software to illustrate the project using "virtual tours". MicroStation developers Bentley Systems presented the SCDOT with one of its 2005 BE Awards of Excellence for its visualization.

United States Senate Bill S.0291 asked for "appropriate federal and state officials to designate" the same three roads as interstate highways. Due to differences in House Bill H.3462, the bills did not pass.

Construction was to start anyway in 2005.

On June 16, 2005, the state Department of Transportation Commission approved allowing the Infrastructure Bank to issue $119 million in bonds. $25 million of the money raised would go toward the "North Myrtle Beach Connector".

On October 10, 2006, the Infrastructure Bank approved a grant of more than $32 million after state Department of Transportation director Betty Mabry said the project could not continue without the money. The primary cause of the increased cost was acquiring right of way in areas where land prices were increasing significantly.

Because of a diamond interchange at South Carolina Highway 31, it appears this road will not become Interstate 174.

City officials hoped the new road would lead to increased development, but most importantly, it provided a hurricane evacuation route. Advertisements would mention the new road as a way to get to North Myrtle Beach more quickly.

State Rep. Tracy Edge, the youngest son of the former mayor for whom the road is named, said the road cost $85 million, about $15 million more than planned, with the increase resulting mainly from higher material costs.

The parkway opened September 3, 2009, with about 300 attending a ceremony on the bridge. Among the participants were Tracy Edge and other family members, as well as county, state and city officials. The road required "nearly 200 workers, 2 million pounds of steel in the bridge, 8,000 linear feet of concrete beams supporting the bridge, concrete equivalent to 570 dump trucks loads, and nearly five years to complete."

On September 8, 2010, a ceremony was held to name the Intracoastal Waterway bridge for J. Bryan Floyd, who defeated the elder Edge to serve as mayor from 1974 to 1980.

State Sen. Dick Elliott, the state legislator who has held office the longest, wanted the bridge named for Floyd when the highway was opened, and he co-sponsored legislation in January 2008 to name the bridge. The measure did not pass the state house at that time.

== Junctions ==
The entire route is in Horry County.

Location	mi	km	Destinations	Notes
North Myrtle Beach	0.00	0.00	US 17 / Main Street south / Ocean Drive – Myrtle Beach, Wilmington	Southern terminus
	0.39– 0.69	0.63– 1.11	J. Bryan Floyd Bridge across the Intracoastal Waterway and Old Sanders Drive	
	1.64– 1.89	2.64– 3.04	SC 31 to SC 9 / US 501 – Conway	Diamond interchange
	2.30	3.70	SC 90 / Champions Boulevard – Conway, Little River, North Myrtle Beach Sports Complex	Northern terminus
1.000 mi = 1.609 km; 1.000 km = 0.621 mi
