= South Carolina Highway 22 =

State highway in South Carolina

South Carolina Highway 22
- Conway Bypass; Veterans Highway
- SC 22 highlighted in red

Route information
- Maintained by SCDOT
- Length: 29.390 mi (47.299 km)
- Existed: 2001–present

Major junctions
- West end: US 501 near Aynor
- US 701 near Homewood; SC 31 at N. Myrtle Beach
- East end: US 17 near Briarcliffe Acres

Location
- Country: United States
- State: South Carolina
- Counties: Horry

Highway system
- South Carolina State Highway System; Interstate; US; State; Scenic
← US 21	→ SC 23

South Carolina Highway 22 (SC 22), also known as the Conway Bypass and Veterans Highway, is a four lane freeway that connects US 501 north of Conway, South Carolina, to US 17 in Myrtle Beach. The road was opened to traffic on May 4, 2001, six months ahead of schedule. It is slated to become part of Interstate 73 in the future. The road largely meets Interstate Highway standards, but in order to support increased Interstate traffic, its shoulders would need to be expanded to standard width.

== History ==
In 1994, the original contract with Fluor Daniel called for six lanes from US 17 to SC 905 and four lanes the rest of the way to US 501. This money depended on a one-cent sales tax devoted to road funding, but voters turned that down.

A bridge was built over the Intracoastal Waterway near Briarcliffe Acres, but it remained the "Bridge to Nowhere" for three years because there was no money to build the road. In February 1999, the South Carolina Senate passed a bill naming the bridge for Billy Alford, state highway commissioner from 1990 to 1994 and commission chair in 1993.

On February 24, 1999, the South Carolina Department of Transportation Commission approved $95 million to make the bypass four lanes. Two years earlier, since money was short, the bypass had been reduced to two lanes beyond SC 90, though the $291.3 million project had six lanes to SC 31.

Even with the changes, the road would end up being cheaper than planned because of narrower shoulders and bridges, and more bridges over wetlands.

On March 4, 1999, The Joint Bond Review Committee approved selling bonds for the money approved in February. Widening the bridges was considered, since some believed that the road could need six lanes in only a few years.

In June 2000, the first section of the Conway Bypass opened 17 months sooner than expected despite flooding from Hurricane Floyd. In November 2000, the section from SC 90 to SC 905, including a 29-foot-high bridge over the Waccamaw River, opened 13 months sooner than planned. The final section opened with a ribbon cutting ceremony in May 2001.

In 2003, the South Carolina General Assembly approved a resolution asking that the Conway Bypass be designated I-73.

SC 22 was flooded by Hurricane Florence in 2018. While Representative Tom Rice proposed raising the road, engineers said such a project was too expensive for an event unlikely to happen again.

== Future ==
=== Southern Evacuation Lifeline ===
The Horry County road plans RIDE III and RIDE IV are providing funding for the Southern Evacuation Lifeline (SELL), a proposed 28-mile (45 km) limited-access highway which would start at the western terminus of SC 22 with US 501 and allow a more direct route west from the southern Strand, while simultaneously, along with SC 22, completing a beltway around the Myrtle Beach area.

=== Interstate 73 ===
South Carolina Highway 22 is slated to be upgraded to Interstate standards and eventually become the southernmost terminus of Interstate 73 (I-73). I-73 will begin where SC 22 starts at US 17 near Briarcliffe Acres. It will then proceed northwest crossing the proposed routing of I-74 (currently SC 31, the Carolina Bays Parkway). After passing Conway, I-73 will leave SC 22 at a new interchange to be constructed two miles (3.2 km) west of US 701, and will then use a new highway to be built between SC 22 and SC 917 north of Cool Spring. The "I-73 Intermediate Traffic and Revenue Study" by C&M Associates, dated February 2016, was to be presented to state transportation officials March 24, 2016 and included upgrades to SC 22.

Interest in I-73 was renewed in early 2021 due in part to the announcement of the American Jobs Plan. Two years later in September 2023, SCDOT announced that Phase I of the project, which would connect I-95 in Dillon County to US 501 south of Latta, would be "shovel ready" by the new year. They also announced that had begun right-of-way purchasing within Horry County from the Little Pee Dee River to the eventual connecting point for I-73 and SC 22.

== Junction list ==
The entire route is in Horry County.

Location	mi	km	Destinations	Notes
Aynor	0.000– 0.560	0.000– 0.901	US 501 – Aynor, Marion, Conway	Western terminus; hybrid interchange consisting of four ramps; three ramps are controlled-access, one is not: the ramp from westbound SC 22 to southbound US 501 crosses US 501's northbound lanes and median at-grade and merges with the left lane of southbound US 501.
Aynor			I-73 north	Future interchange (unfunded)
	4.880	7.854	SC 319 – Aynor	Diamond interchange
	8.250	13.277	US 701 to SC 410 – Loris, Conway	Four ramp folded diamond interchange, including a loop ramp from US 701 to eastbound SC 22
	19.120	30.771	SC 905 – Longs, Conway	Four ramp folded diamond interchange, including a loop ramp from westbound SC 22 to SC 905
	23.217– 23.258	37.364– 37.430	SC 90 – Little River, Conway	Four ramp folded diamond interchange, including a loop ramp from eastbound SC 22 to SC 90
North Myrtle Beach	27.074– 27.153	43.571– 43.699	SC 31 to US 501 / SC 9 – Myrtle Beach	Cloverstack interchange
Intracoastal Waterway	28.587– 28.737	46.006– 46.248	William H. Alford Bridge	
Briarcliffe Acres	28.860– 29.390	46.446– 47.299	US 17 / Kings Road – Myrtle Beach, North Myrtle Beach	Eastern terminus; trumpet interchange; Kings Road crosses US 17 at-grade within the interchange.
1.000 mi = 1.609 km; 1.000 km = 0.621 mi
