= Carolina Forest Boulevard =

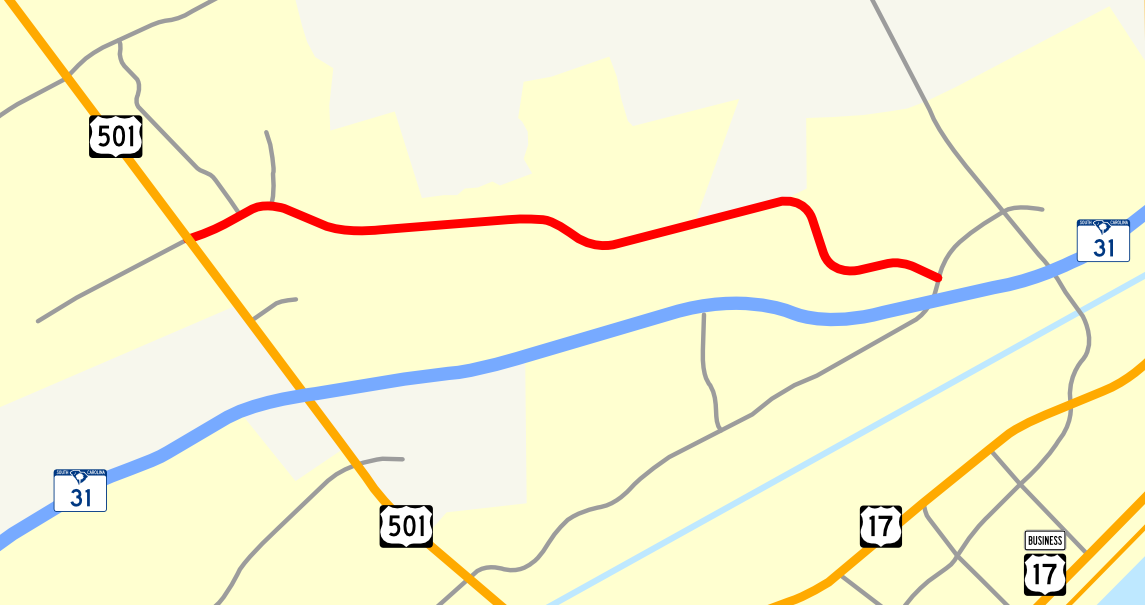
- Length: 6.2 mi (10.0 km)
- Location: Horry County
- East end: Village Center Blvd; 33°45′12″N 78°52′4″W
- West end: US 501; 33°45′28″N 78°58′2″W

Construction
- Inauguration: =1995

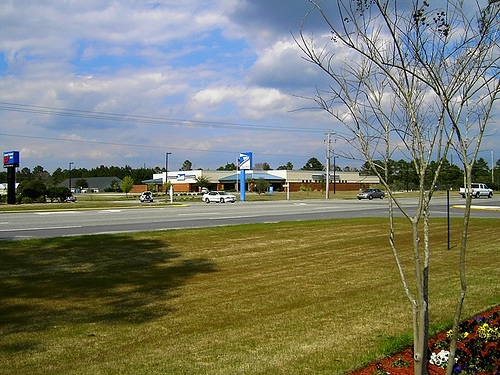
Carolina Forest Boulevard at Postal Way in Carolina Forest, South Carolina

Carolina Forest Boulevard is the main roadway through Carolina Forest, South Carolina, initially built when the development by International Paper was created in the 1990s. The road is approximately 6 miles (9.7 km) in length, and runs through the center of the Carolina Forest development (which is projected to have a population of 56,000 residents when completed). A one-mile (1.6 km) segment near Carolina Forest Plaza and US 501 is five lanes and narrows into two lanes near Carolina Forest Elementary School. It ends at Village Center Boulevard, just after intersecting River Oaks Drive; having access to South Carolina Highway 31 and US Highway 17.

== History ==
Previous to the development of Carolina Forest, the path of Carolina Forest included scattered logging roads in the immense tract of land owned by International Paper. West Perry Road and various other dirt logging roads, as evidenced on earlier maps, make out a rough path of the current roadway.

In November 1995, the first part of Carolina Forest Boulevard was completed, which would help provide an 11-mile (18 km) loop throughout the tract of land along with River Oaks Drive. The two roads would link the new development of Carolina Forest with the older River Oaks development several miles east. The western 1.25 miles (2.01 km) of the boulevard were initially five lanes designed to carry heavy traffic to the new Carolina Forest Plaza, the U.S. Post Office, Carolina Forest Elementary School, two golf courses, and several residential neighborhoods.

In August 2004, a third lane was added near Carolina Forest Elementary School to accommodate school traffic.

In October 2007, eastern parts of Carolina Forest Boulevard were expanded to accommodate the commercial development in the Town Centre area of Carolina Forest. River Oaks Drive, along with International Drive, were both widened to five lanes in the area.

In February 2008, it was announced that bids were being taken to widen Carolina Forest Boulevard to five lanes from Carolina Forest Elementary School to Walkers Woods. The widening project commenced in April 2008. The project was completed in mid-August 2008 with a stoplight and pedestrian walkways added at Gateway Road. Postal Way, an additional traffic connector in the area, opened as a separate project in November 2008 which coincided with the finalizations of the Carolina Forest Boulevard road project.

== Plans ==
Carolina Forest Boulevard was recently extended into the Village Square Shopping Center and currently terminates at Village Center Boulevard. Plans call for the entire road to be widened into a multi-lane, divided highway running through the center of Carolina Forest. As of June 2011, 4.7 miles (7.6 km) of the 6.25 miles (10.06 km) road still needs widening, at a cost of $9 to $10 million, with bicycle paths to be included.
