= Robert Grissom Parkway =

Robert M. Grissom Parkway
- Robert Grissom Parkway; Grissom Parkway
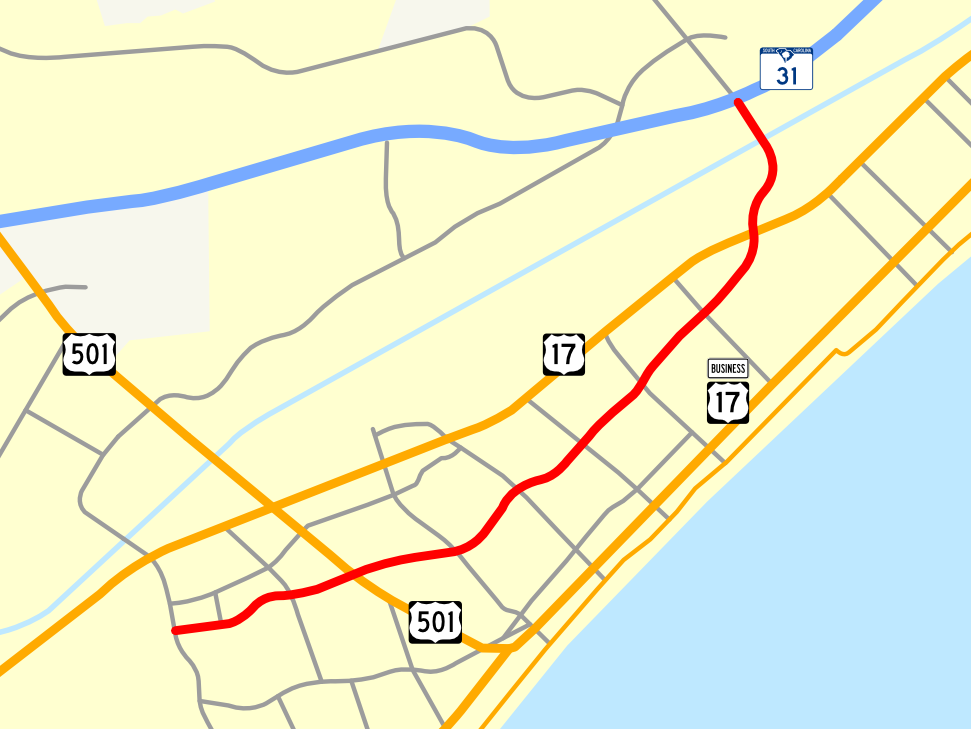

Route information
- Maintained by SCDOT
- Length: 7.0 mi (11.3 km)
- Existed: 2002–present

Major junctions
- Northeast end: SC 31 / International Dr.
- US 17; US 501
- Southwest end: Harrelson Boulevard

Location
- Country: United States
- State: South Carolina
- Counties: Horry

Highway system
- South Carolina State Highway System; Interstate; US; State; Scenic

Robert M. Grissom Parkway, locally known as Grissom Parkway, is a major four-lane connector highway in Myrtle Beach, South Carolina. The road begins at Harrelson Boulevard near Myrtle Beach International Airport and terminates in Carolina Forest, South Carolina at SC Highway 31 and International Drive. It provides access to Myrtle Beach attractions such as Coastal Grand Mall, TicketReturn.com Field and Broadway at the Beach and is used as an alternative road to U.S. 17 and Kings Highway in Myrtle Beach. It has bike paths and sidewalks for pedestrian traffic. These are part of the East Coast Greenway, a 3,000 mile long system of trails connecting Maine to Florida.

== Route description ==
When the road was completed, it replaced Old Socastee Highway (former routing of South Carolina Highway 707) between Pine Island Road and U.S. 501 as well as Central Parkway at Broadway at the Beach between 21st Avenue North and 29th Avenue North.

== History ==
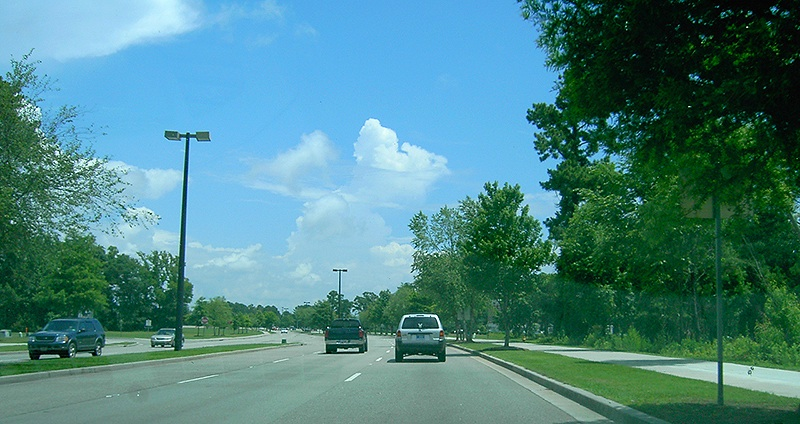
Grissom Parkway between 10th and 21st Avenues North in Myrtle Beach

Robert Grissom Parkway is based on a road planned as early as 1979.

In 1996, sections of Central Parkway, a road planned by Burroughs & Chapin, were already complete between 21st Avenue North and 38th Avenue North, and between 44th Avenue North and 48th Avenue North. Taken over as of 1996 by the city, the road could be extended to U.S. 501 in five or six years using property taxes and admissions taxes at Broadway at the Beach attractions, plus a possible hospitality tax on hotel rooms, meals and admissions. Eventually, Central Parkway would be extended south to a planned airport road (later named Harrelson Boulevard) and north to 62nd Avenue North.

In 1998, a $2.66 million section of Central Parkway, four lanes with a median between 10th Avenue North and 21st Avenue North, was under construction as a RIDE project. In five years, the road was expected to run from Harrelson Boulevard across U.S. 501 and U.S. 17 Bypass to 62nd Avenue North, which would connect to Carolina Bays Parkway. By February 1999, plans called for Central Parkway to connect directly to Carolina Bays Parkway rather than to an extended 62nd Avenue North.

Robert "Bob" Grissom served as Myrtle Beach mayor 12 years, longer than any other mayor, and on the city council for 13 years. He led the effort to return minor league baseball to the city, but Coastal Federal Field (now BB&T Coastal Field) was not named for him. With the section of Central Parkway leading to the stadium opening in April 1999, the city made the decision to honor the late mayor by naming it Robert M. Grissom Parkway. The name change took effect immediately between 10th Avenue North and 29th Avenue North, with other sections to be renamed in stages.

Additional work on Grissom Parkway began in March 2001, with three sections of the $30 million RIDE project to be finished over the next year. Included in the project was the widening of an existing section of Old Socastee Highway. The concrete plant owned by Grissom fell victim to the road named for him.

On April 5, 2002, the section between Harrelson Boulevard and U.S. 501 opened. On May 6, the section between U.S. 501 and Mr. Joe White Avenue (formerly 10th Avenue North) opened. This was followed on July 1 by the section between 38th and 48th Avenues North. North of 48th Avenue, work had begun on the connection to Carolina Bays Parkway. With the opening of Carolina Bays Parkway on December 17, 2002, Grissom Parkway was complete all the way from that new road to the airport, with "tree-lined medians, trees planted on the shoulders of the road, bike paths and pedestrian sidewalks."

In July 2003, a $2.6 million upgrade to the Carolina Bays Parkway interchange began, providing additional access to Carolina Forest. An unpaved road called International Drive connected to S.C. 90, but provided no access to other main roads. A year later, the road still had not been paved, but by 2009 there was a plan to do so, though as of 2016 the project was still delayed. Grissom Parkway had become very popular with tourists, people living in the area, and businesses looking for a good location. However, the city did not intend the road to provide easy access to business, and policies assured this would continue to be the case. International Drive officially opened July 25, 2018.

Since 2006, the intersection with 21st Avenue N. has been the start line for the annual Bi-Lo Marathon, and since 2011 the section from US 17 Bypass to BB&T Coastal Field (with the exception of two short turnaround points) has been used for the final five miles.

== Major intersections ==
The entire route is in Horry County.

Location	mi	km	Destinations	Notes
Myrtle Beach	0.0	0.0	MYR / Harrelson Boulevard	Southern terminus
Myrtle Beach	1.0	1.6	Pine Island Road	
Myrtle Beach	1.5	2.4	US 501 – Downtown Myrtle Beach, Conway	
Myrtle Beach	2.3	3.7	Mr. Joe White Avenue	
Myrtle Beach	3.0	4.8	21st Avenue North	
Myrtle Beach	3.6	5.8	29th Avenue North	
Myrtle Beach	4.3	6.9	38th Avenue North	
Myrtle Beach	5.0	8.0	48th Avenue North	
Myrtle Beach	5.8	9.3	US 17 – North Myrtle Beach, Georgetown	Full Interchange
Myrtle Beach	6.5	10.5	Bridge across the Intracoastal Waterway	
Carolina Forest	6.9	11.1	SC 31 to US 501 / SC 9 – North Myrtle Beach	
Carolina Forest	7.0	11.3	International Drive	Northern terminus
1.000 mi = 1.609 km; 1.000 km = 0.621 mi
