= Harrelson Boulevard =

Highway in Myrtle Beach, South Carolina, US

Coordinates: 33.6953154°N 78.927612°W

- Dr. W. Leroy Harrelson Boulevard

Route information
- Maintained by Horry County
- Length: 1.7 mi (2.7 km)
- Existed: 2002–present

Major junctions
- Northwest end: US 17 in Myrtle Beach
- Grissom Parkway
- Southeast end: US 17 Bus. in Myrtle Beach

Location
- Country: United States
- State: South Carolina
- Counties: Horry

Highway system
- South Carolina State Highway System; Interstate; US; State; Scenic

Harrelson Boulevard is a four-lane highway in Myrtle Beach, South Carolina, named for Myrtle Beach's first mayor Dr. W. Leroy Harrelson Sr., who was elected to office in 1938. It starts at U.S. 17, and goes to Myrtle Beach International Airport and runs near Coastal Grand Mall. The highway is also the southern terminus for Grissom Parkway. It replaced the two-lane Jetport Road.

As part of the project to expand the Myrtle Beach International Airport, Harrelson Boulevard was extended to U.S. 17 Business, with the official opening ceremony January 26, 2012.

The East Coast Greenway runs along Harrelson Boulevard.

== Fantasy Harbour bridge ==
The Economic Development Industrial Cluster Act of 1996 let local governments in South Carolina use admissions tax revenues for road improvements and other infrastructure projects. Fantasy Harbour, a group of attractions off U.S. 501 west of the Intracoastal Waterway, could use such a tax to repay loans from a "state infrastructure bank" for a proposed $15 million bridge from there over the waterway to U.S. 17.

On August 21, 1997, Myrtle Beach City Council saw a Jetport Road master plan which called for a $10.9 million upgrade, with a new four-lane road parallel to the runway at Myrtle Beach International Airport, connecting the planned Fantasy Harbour bridge with Kings Highway at 29th Avenue South by late 1999. The new road would also intersect the planned Central Parkway. Interchanges would come later; stop lights were planned at U.S. 17, though by 2005 an interchange would be necessary there. On January 26, 1999, at the request of Burroughs & Chapin, the city council voted to contribute to upgrading Jetport Road to provide access to the new mall. Other funding came from the Airport Trust Fund. As of December 1999, the plan was for bids on the $6 million replacement for Jetport Road by March 2000, with completion in summer 2001.

In February 2001, Horry County officials voted to ask the State Infrastructure Bank for $173 million for South Carolina Highway 31, a connector from the parkway to North Myrtle Beach, and a bridge over the Intracoastal Waterway at Fantasy Harbour. The state wanted the county to match 10 percent of that amount. The portion for the Fantasy Harbour bridge was expected to come in part from the Fantasy Harbour admissions tax. The interchange at U.S. 17 and Harrelson Boulevard, which would connect to the bridge, was already being built.

The Infrastructure Bank chose not to provide money for the projects at that time, but did approve $135 million in December 2001.

On October 15, 2002, state highway officials approved $63 million for the "Main Street Connector" and the Fantasy Harbour bridge. The Fantasy Harbour bridge still had a number of obstacles, including potential environmental problems. The interchange at U.S. Route 17 opened February 19, 2002.

In July 2005, the Infrastructure Bank approved issuing $37 million in bonds for the Fantasy Harbour bridge and the North Myrtle Beach Connector.

Construction began on the 1800-foot bridge in May 2007.

The $46 million bridge opened July 1, 2009 more than a decade after it was first proposed. This road bypasses the traffic across the waterway bridge on U.S. Route 501. It also provides a connection to Fantasy Harbour, Medieval Times, and Freestyle Music Park. Harrelson Boulevard becomes George Bishop Parkway where it joins the road built years earlier.

On August 5, 2022, the bridge over US Highway 17 was named Patrolman Jacob Hancher Overpass for Myrtle Beach police officer Jacob Hancher, who was killed in the line of duty in October 2020.

== Extension to Kings Highway ==
In 1998, the Myrtle Beach City Council considered a $6 million plan to extend Harrelson Boulevard (formerly Jetport Road) to Kings Highway at 29th Avenue South as "a four-lane divided parkway with bike paths and 'gateway-style landscaping'." Because of the planned mall, money for this project went to upgrading the existing road instead.

By September 2010, work was beginning on phase one of the road's extension, an alternative to Farrow Parkway during the reworking of that road's intersection with U.S. 17.

Phase two of the road's extension to Kings Highway started September 15, 2011. The extension cost $8.9 million to build. A ceremony to celebrate the road's completion took place January 26, 2012, attended by Leroy Harrelson Jr., son of the city's first mayor for whom the road is named.

== Major intersections ==
The entire route is in Horry County.

Location	mi	km	Destinations	Notes
Myrtle Beach	0.0	0.0	US 17 – Georgetown, Surfside Beach, North Myrtle Beach	Western terminus
Myrtle Beach	0.29	0.47	Grissom Parkway	Southwestern terminus of Grissom Parkway
Myrtle Beach	0.34	0.55	Hwy 15	
Myrtle Beach	1.1	1.8	Jetport Road (Myrtle Beach Intl. Airport)	
Myrtle Beach	1.7	2.7	US 17 Bus. – Myrtle Beach, Surfside Beach	Eastern terminus
1.000 mi = 1.609 km; 1.000 km = 0.621 mi
