= Gary Loftus =

American politician

Gary M. Loftus is the past director of the Coastal Federal Center for Economic and Community Development. The center is housed in Coastal Carolina University's E. Craig Wall Sr. College of Business Administration.

Loftus is a noted area civic and tourism industry leader. He is past chairman of the Myrtle Beach Area Hospitality Association and Myrtle Beach Golf Holiday, and a past chairman of the Myrtle Beach Area Chamber of Commerce. He has served on the board of directors of the South Carolina Hotel-Motel Association and the Hospitality Association of South Carolina. He is currently a member of the City of Myrtle Beach Tourism Committee.

Loftus has been very involved in the highway and transportation needs of both Horry County and the State of South Carolina. He has served as the First Congressional District Representative on the South Carolina Department of Transportation Commission. He is also a member of the Business Alliance of the South Carolina Transportation Policy Council. He was first chairman of the Horry County Road Improvement and Development Effort (R.I.D.E.) Committee formed by former governor David Beasley.

Loftus was presented the South Carolina Order of the Palmetto in 1997, the Myrtle Beach Area Chamber of Commerce's Citizen of the Year Award in 1998, and the South Carolina Hotelier of the Year Award for 1995–1996.

From 1974 to 2002, he was general manager of the Bar Harbor Motor Inn in Myrtle Beach. Prior to that, he was an engineering systems design, sales, and service specialist for a leading manufacturer of industrial and aircraft hydraulic and pneumatic components for twelve years. He is president of G & K Management, Inc., a Surfside Beach management and consulting firm.

He is a graduate of Princeton University, where he earned a Bachelor of Science in Engineering degree in 1962.

In 2008 Loftus was elected to the Horry County Council (2009-).
