= Carolina Forest, South Carolina =

- Census-designated place
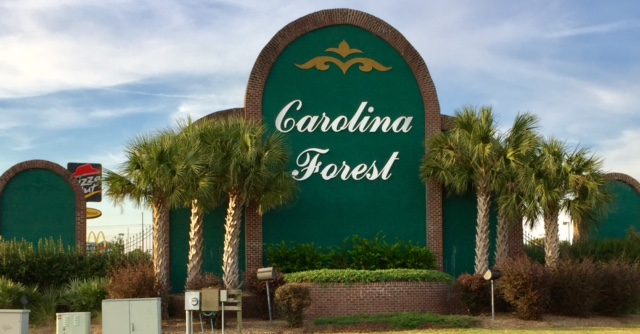
- Sign at the entrance to Carolina Forest at the intersection of US 501 and Carolina Forest Boulevard

- Location within South Carolina Location within the United States
- Coordinates: 33°45′25″N 78°52′55″W
- Country: United States
- State: South Carolina
- County: Horry

Area
  - Total: 17.29 sq mi (44.77 km^{2})
  - Land: 16.81 sq mi (43.55 km^{2})
  - Water: 0.47 sq mi (1.22 km^{2})
- Elevation: 30 ft (9.1 m)

Population (2020)
  - Total: 23,342
  - Density: 1,388.2/sq mi (535.97/km^{2})
- Time zone: UTC-5 (Eastern (EST))
  - Summer (DST): UTC-4 (EDT)
- ZIP Code: 29579 (Myrtle Beach)
- Area code: 843
- FIPS code: 45-11833
- GNIS feature ID: 2812966

Carolina Forest is a census-designated place (CDP) in Horry County, South Carolina, United States. It was first listed as a CDP in the 2020 census with a population of 23,342.

It is located west of Myrtle Beach and east of Conway in an area planned by International Paper in the late 1990s. Most of the development follows the Carolina Forest Master Plan, developed cooperatively between International Paper and the Horry County Government.

Carolina Forest also includes the unincorporated community of Pine Island.

== Geography ==
Carolina Forest is situated west of the Intracoastal Waterway; between U.S. Route 501 and International Drive. Carolina Forest was developed in and around existing longleaf pine forests and savannas, within the Waccamaw River watershed, part of the greater lower watershed of the Pee Dee River. The topography of the region between the Waccamaw River and the Intracoastal Waterway is spotted with Carolina Bays, which are elliptical-shaped depressions in the land, often filled with thick vegetation and rich in biodiversity.

== History ==
Carolina Forest was once part of a larger tract of land in eastern Horry County called the Buist Tract. Originally owned by Burroughs & Chapin, International Paper bought the 30,000-acre (121 km^{2}) Buist Tract in 1937. It was used as part of the Conway Bombing and Gunnery Range during World War II. In 1960, the company donated part of the tract for what is now Coastal Carolina University (located several miles away from Carolina Forest). In 1989, approximately 9,000 acres (36 km^{2}) north of Carolina Forest were donated to the state to form the Lewis Ocean Bay Heritage Preserve.

In June 1994, Kylee Mueller sold 125 acres (0.51 km^{2}) of the remaining 21,000 acres (85 km^{2}) of the Buist Tract to Horry County Schools for development of Carolina Forest Elementary School, Carolina Forest Middle School, and Carolina Forest High School. In addition, 350 acres (1.4 km^{2}) were sold to form a golf course and residential property.

By the end of 1994, International Paper began to sell more of its land. Due to the lack of funding from other sources for road infrastructure, the first 1.25 miles (2.01 km) of Carolina Forest Boulevard were completed by November 1995 by International Paper. Further expansions of both Carolina Forest Boulevard and River Oaks Drive (creating an 11-mile (18 km) loop) would open up 11,000 acres (45 km^{2}) to development west of the Intracoastal Waterway. Carolina Forest Boulevard was completed in December 1996, with River Oaks Drive being completed in December 1997.

On December 2, 1997, Horry County council voted to freeze zoning rules in an 11 square miles (28 km^{2}) area of Carolina Forest for 20 years in exchange for land to build parks and roads in an 8–3 vote on the development agreement. An estimated 35,000 people would live in the 7,073 acres (29 km^{2}) covered by the agreement. In the agreement, Horry County did not require International Paper to widen Carolina Forest Boulevard or River Oaks Drive to four lanes. Land would be given to the county at no cost for the then-future SC Highway 31 north and south of the Robert Grissom Parkway bridge. Approximately 140 acres (0.57 km^{2}) was set aside for future schools, which would include Ocean Bay Elementary and Middle Schools. Because nearly half of Carolina Forest was open space, the area was exempt from future open space directives set by Horry County.

Carolina Forest was also home to the Myrtle Beach Speedway from 1958 to 2020, the track held the NASCAR Cup Series from 1958 to 1965, the NASCAR Busch Series' Myrtle Beach 250 from 1988 to 2000, and other racing events including the Myrtle Beach 400, the track was sold off and demolished in 2020 for redevelopment, it is now the site of Victory Point.

According to the 2010 census, Carolina Forest's population increased from 3400 in 2000 to 21,000.

== Education ==
Horry County School District is the sole school district in the county.

Carolina Forest has a public library, a branch of the Horry County Memorial Library.

== Demographics ==
Historical population
Census	Pop.	Note	%±
2020	23,342		—
U.S. Decennial Census; 2020

Carolina Forest first appeared as a census designated place in the 2020 U.S. census.

=== 2020 census ===
As of the 2020 census, Carolina Forest had a population of 23,342. The median age was 39.6 years. 23.2% of residents were under the age of 18 and 18.2% of residents were 65 years of age or older. For every 100 females there were 94.5 males, and for every 100 females age 18 and over there were 90.3 males age 18 and over.

96.8% of residents lived in urban areas, while 3.2% lived in rural areas.

There were 8,991 households in Carolina Forest, of which 32.7% had children under the age of 18 living in them. Of all households, 52.1% were married-couple households, 15.8% were households with a male householder and no spouse or partner present, and 24.3% were households with a female householder and no spouse or partner present. About 21.9% of all households were made up of individuals and 7.6% had someone living alone who was 65 years of age or older.

There were 10,179 housing units, of which 11.7% were vacant. The homeowner vacancy rate was 2.5% and the rental vacancy rate was 11.8%.

Racial composition as of the 2020 census
Race	Number	Percent
White	18,303	78.4%
Black or African American	1,858	8.0%
American Indian and Alaska Native	61	0.3%
Asian	651	2.8%
Native Hawaiian and Other Pacific Islander	22	0.1%
Some other race	697	3.0%
Two or more races	1,750	7.5%
Hispanic or Latino (of any race)	1,698	7.3%

Carolina Forest CDP, South Carolina – Demographic Profile (NH = Non-Hispanic)
Race / Ethnicity	Pop 2020	% 2020
White alone (NH)	17,867	76.54%
Black or African American alone (NH)	1,805	7.73%
Native American or Alaska Native alone (NH)	52	0.22%
Asian alone (NH)	646	2.77%
Pacific Islander alone (NH)	20	0.09%
Some Other Race alone (NH)	178	0.76%
Mixed Race/Multi-Racial (NH)	1,076	4.61%
Hispanic or Latino (any race)	1,698	7.27%
Total	23,342	100.00%

Note: the US Census treats Hispanic/Latino as an ethnic category. This table excludes Latinos from the racial categories and assigns them to a separate category. Hispanics/Latinos can be of any race.
