= Briarcliffe Acres, South Carolina =

- Town
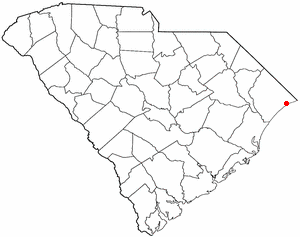
- Location in South Carolina
- Coordinates: 33°47′25″N 78°45′06″W
- Country: United States
- State: South Carolina
- County: Horry
- Settled: 1950s

Area
  - Total: 0.64 sq mi (1.65 km^{2})
  - Land: 0.64 sq mi (1.65 km^{2})
  - Water: 0 sq mi (0.00 km^{2})
- Elevation: 30 ft (9.1 m)

Population (2020)
  - Total: 479
  - Density: 753.5/sq mi (290.92/km^{2})
- Time zone: UTC-5 (Eastern)
  - Summer (DST): UTC-4 (Eastern)
- ZIP code: 29572
- Area codes: 843, 854
- FIPS code: 45-08830
- GNIS feature ID: 2405318
- Website: www.townofbriarcliffe.us

Briarcliffe Acres is a town in Horry County, South Carolina, United States, located between Myrtle Beach and North Myrtle Beach. As of the 2020 census, Briarcliffe Acres had a population of 479.

== Geography ==
Briarcliffe Acres is located in southeastern Horry County and is bordered to the north and east by the city of North Myrtle Beach. U.S. Route 17 forms the northern border of the town, leading northeast 4 miles (6 km) to the center of North Myrtle Beach and southwest 11 miles (18 km) to the center of Myrtle Beach.

According to the United States Census Bureau, the town has a total area of 0.66 square miles (1.7 km^{2}), all land.

== History ==
Briarcliffe Acres was developed as a retirement community by Kenneth Ellsworth, a native of Briarcliff Manor, New York (from which he took the name of his project), who married Virginia (Ginny) Gasque (pronounced "gas-kwee" or, by some, "gas-kee"). Her family came from the nearby town of Conway, South Carolina. Briarcliffe was one of the first planned communities in the Southeast.

In the early (pre-1930) parts of the 20th century, the coastal areas of northernmost South Carolina were used mostly as farming sites. (The real estate monolith now known as Burroughs and Chapin for decades was named "Myrtle Beach Farms".) Sea breezes washed nutrients on crops planted on sand dunes, much as now is done through roots in hydroponic gardens, and cotton and tobacco thrived; farmers from Loris, Galivants Ferry, Florence and other Lowcountry towns bought land on the coast for practical reasons and then spent summers with their families there, rather than stay in the hellish heat and sand fleas of their main farms.

As a result, a few people subsequently built vacation homes in the first resort area, Murrells Inlet, and, later, erected rooming houses north in what would become Myrtle Beach. One influential example was the Patricia Court (later Patricia Inn and now Patricia Grand Resort) started in the 1930s but reaching importance in the late 1940s, built by Patricia Rousseau of North Wilkesboro, North Carolina. Further north still, Ken and Ginny Ellsworth recognized that the idea of living at the beach for its own sake could be expanded into a community. They found a large tract of land owned by Elizabeth Patterson, a daughter of Simeon B. Chapin.

As soon as it was possible after acquiring the property, the Ellsworths dug a yacht basin on the adjacent Intracoastal Waterway, on the land side of US Highway 17. They built a small cottage between the highway and yacht basin so they could be close both to the wealthy people on the waterway and the potentially larger numbers of people driving down the main road from New York to Miami. (The idea of capitalizing on the highway also motivated Jack Nelson who built the El Rancho Motel, once featured in Life Magazine, about ten miles (16 km) south.) Ken and Ginny cut roads, layered them with coquina (a local mix of sand and fossilized shells), and looked for residents.

Among the first people to move in were Ginny's parents, who built a home on what is now North Gate Road, just on the edge of the brow above the drop-down to the beach, backing up to the huge lot owned by the Lewis family (who owned the northernmost fishing pier in the area). The location on the brow—like that of Patterson's home, on the opposite end of the property—was intended to provide both easy access to the shore and protection from storms (a plan that has worked until the present day).

Next came the Sorry (pronounced "Sow-ree"; rhymes with "Horry", as in the county) family, who built next to the Gasques. They were followed by the Dutch van Buren family (distant descendants of the American President), who discovered the place by anchoring one night in the yacht basin on a trip south and then visiting the land, deciding to build a home and retire, which proved the wisdom of Ken Ellsworth's original scheme.

The van Burens told another Dutch family — Anton Frederik and Casperina Hermina Groeneveld Baarslag, friends of theirs from New York and Vermont — about the place, who visited and then moved down in 1950.

In 1951 Alfred Colby Hockings and his wife — he was a well-known illustrator for Field & Stream magazine, originally from Wisconsin but most recently living in the artists' community of Tryon, North Carolina — built a home up the street from the Gasques and Sorrys and across from the Baarslags; at almost the same time another Dutch family — Gerbrand and Nellie Poster, the son-in-law and daughter of the Baarslags — came down from New York City to visit her parents for Christmas, decided to stay, and built a home next door to her parents. (Poster was later to found Coastal Federal Savings and Loan Association and use connections developed during his military service as a Dutch national in the US Army during World War II to help convince the US government to declare that the damage done by Hurricane Hazel in 1954 should be covered by insurance. This made possible the second renaissance of the community, the first having been its emergence from the Great Depression.)

At this time, all the homes in Briarcliffe—except for the van Burens, who lived across the road from the central lake, and Elizabeth Patterson, whose home was on what is now Middle Gate Road—were clustered along what is now North Gate Road. Two developments, one small and one huge, changed Briarcliffe in ways that remain to this day.

The first was the Poster family itself, which when moving in included a seven-year-old and a four-year-old and who were soon joined by a newborn. This changed the tenor of Briarcliffe by moving it from a retirement community to a third (less-expensive) alternative to the Pine Lakes and Dunes sections, all of which offered a place to rear a family close to, but not in, the increasing tawdriness of Myrtle Beach itself.

The second was the financial impact of the government's intervention with the insurance companies after Hurricane Hazel. The companies had wanted to declare the damage "high water", which was not covered; Poster convinced the authorities that the damage had been caused by "wind-driven water", which was covered. This changed the whole of Myrtle Beach, as payment of claims allowed small rooming houses to be replaced by motels. This impacted the whole of coastal South Carolina, including Briarcliffe.

At the same time, the United States Air Force had decided to deal with the Myrtle Beach Air Force Base by treating it as a sort of reward to which people could be assigned if they deserved a vacation, or a punishment for those whose careers were at an end.

Many people in both groups chose Briarcliffe as a place in which to build or buy, ranging from Air Force heroes (such as Col. Francis ["Gabby"] Gabreski, the first pilot to be an "ace" in two wars) to investors, artists and simple families. The boom in Myrtle Beach led to a boom in Briarcliffe, and soon a community once associated with raccoons and deer became a residential destination.

Among the significant people in this new wave must be remembered Rolf Bierens, another Dutchman who—having retired from General Motors thanks to his involvement in the design of their automatic transmission—first built his home with his own hands and then the first cabana. Increasingly, other residents brought histories, such as the then-industrialist Krampf, button-manufacturer Schwanda and developer Passow.

Briarcliffe Acres is still a place of lakes, pine and scrub-oak forests and wild animals. Although the surrounding Grand Strand area has changed and been developed, Briarcliffe Acres remains much like it was in the 1960s.

== Demographics ==
Historical population
Census	Pop.	Note	%±
1980	338		—
1990	552		63.3%
2000	470		−14.9%
2010	457		−2.8%
2020	479		4.8%
U.S. Decennial Census

=== 2020 census ===
Briarcliffe Acres racial composition
Race	Num.	Perc.
White (non-Hispanic)	461	96.24%
Black or African American (non-Hispanic)	7	1.46%
Asian	2	0.42%
Other/Mixed	5	1.04%
Hispanic or Latino	4	0.84%

As of the 2020 United States census, there were 479 people, 201 households, and 136 families residing in the town.

A 2022 U.S. Census American Community Survey showed that Briarcliffe Acres has a mean household income of $134,375. MSN.com named the city fourth richest in South Carolina in 2024, and Forbes said it was sixth richest in 2023.

=== 2000 census ===
As of the census of 2000, there were 470 people, 200 households, and 145 families residing in the town. The population density was 719.7 inhabitants per square mile (277.9/km^{2}). There were 221 housing units at an average density of 338.4 per square mile (130.7/km^{2}). The racial makeup of the town was 98.72% White, 0.85% African American, 0.21% Asian, and 0.21% from two or more races. Hispanic or Latino of any race were 0.43% of the population.

There were 200 households, out of which 24.0% had children under the age of 18 living with them, 67.0% were married couples living together, 4.0% had a female householder with no husband present, and 27.5% were non-families. 21.5% of all households were made up of individuals, and 13.5% had someone living alone who was 65 years of age or older. The average household size was 2.35 and the average family size was 2.74.

In the town, the population was spread out, with 19.8% under the age of 18, 3.2% from 18 to 24, 17.2% from 25 to 44, 35.5% from 45 to 64, and 24.3% who were 65 years of age or older. The median age was 51 years. For every 100 females, there were 89.5 males. For every 100 females age 18 and over, there were 89.4 males.

The median income for a household in the town was $82,437, and the median income for a family was $100,000. Males had a median income of $100,000 versus $29,688 for females. The per capita income for the town was $52,871. None of the families and 1.9% of the population were living below the poverty line, including no under eighteens and 1.5% of those over 64.

== Major highways ==
- US 17
- SC 22

== System of government ==
Briarcliffe Acres has a mayor and four-member town council. The mayor and town council members serve four-year terms.

== Education ==
Horry County School District is the sole school district in the county.
