= Coastal Conservation League =

U.S. non-profit organization

- South Carolina Coastal Conservation League Inc
- Formation: 1989; 36 years ago
- Type: Nonprofit
- Tax ID no.: 57-0887278
- Legal status: 501(c)(3)
- Headquarters: Charleston, South Carolina
- Board Chair: Kent Griffin
- Executive Director: Faith Rivers James
- Website: https://www.coastalconservationleague.org/

The Coastal Conservation League is a nature conservation organization focused on protecting and enhancing the environment of South Carolina. Its executive director is Faith Rivers James, she began in August 2022. Previous executive directors are Laura Cantral, who left the organization in late 2021. Cantral had replaced the founder and previous executive director, Dana Beach in 2018.
