= South Carolina Highway 31 =

State highway in South Carolina

South Carolina Highway 31
- Carolina Bays Parkway; John B. Singleton Parkway
- SC 31 highlighted in red

Route information
- Maintained by SCDOT
- Length: 28.097 mi (45.218 km)
- Existed: 2002–present

Major junctions
- South end: SC 707 near Socastee
- US 501 on the Forestbrook–Carolina Forest line; SC 22 near North Myrtle Beach
- North end: SC 9 in Little River

Location
- Country: United States
- State: South Carolina
- Counties: Horry

Highway system
- South Carolina State Highway System; Interstate; US; State; Scenic
← SC 30	→ SC 33

South Carolina Highway 31 (SC 31), also known as the Carolina Bays Parkway, is a 28.097-mile (45.218 km) six-lane, limited-access highway that parallels (in most cases) the Intracoastal Waterway around Myrtle Beach. The first phase opened on December 17, 2002, completing a 22-mile (35 km) link between U.S. Route 501 (US 501) and SC 9. The second phase opened in March 2005, running from US 501 southwest to S.C. Highway 544. The third phase opened on November 7, 2019, extending to SC 707. While usually referred to only as the Carolina Bays Parkway, the highway is also dedicated the John B. Singleton Parkway in memory of John B. Singleton, a former Myrtle Beach City Council member and police commissioner.

== Route description ==
The route first starts at the interchange with S.C. 707 with a trumpet interchange where it then heads northwest before curving northeast. The route then makes an interchange at S.C. 544 near Socastee where it continues on for about four miles before reaching U.S. 501 at an unusual interchange which has elements of a trumpet interchange. After that interchange, it continues at an easterly direction towards the interchange with Grissom Parkway/International Drive followed by Water Tower Road which eventually reaches the interchange with S.C. 22 with a two-level cloverstack interchange. S.C. 31 then heads for about eight miles before reaching the interchange at S.C. 90 (Robert Edge Parkway) near North Myrtle Beach before it reaches the trumpet interchange with S.C. 9 near Little River.

== History ==
=== Early history ===
The road that would eventually become Carolina Bays Parkway was planned as early as 1989 by then-U.S. Representative Robin Tallon. The roadway would ease traffic problems in Myrtle Beach, especially on US 17 Bypass. The road derives its name from the various Carolina bays located west of the Intracoastal Waterway that would be close to the road. The following year, the Carolina Bays Parkway Task Force was established to help develop a plan for how the road would be built. The 1991 Intermodal Surface Transportation Efficiency Act was passed to allow the road to receive $9.6 million in federal funding as part of Corridor 5.

In March 1996, voters in Horry County defeated a measure that would have levied a 1 percent sales tax countywide to pay for future road infrastructure in the Myrtle Beach area, including what would be a bypass to alleviate traffic problems in Myrtle Beach and the future Carolina Forest development. South Carolina Governor David Beasley created a local task force in May 1996 to determine short-term and long-term goals for the greater Grand Strand. The concept that came out of the rejection of the sales tax increase would be called "Plan B." The commission set up became what is currently known as the Road Improvement and Development Effort, or RIDE, headed by Gary Loftus, a former highway commissioner.

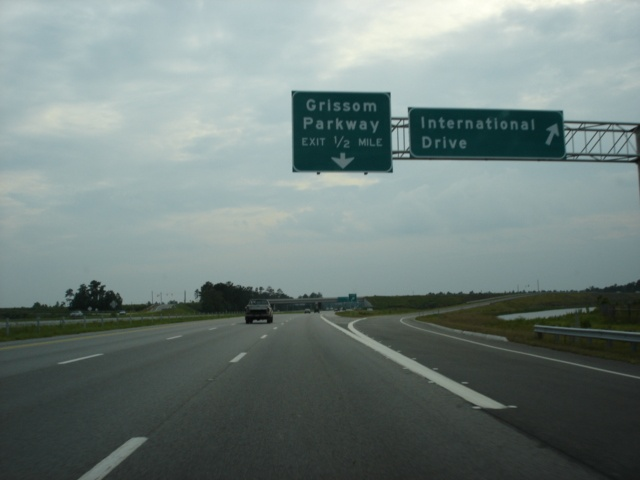
SC 31 at Grissom Pkwy going south

To avoid the difficulties that occurred with the failed tax increase, the committee sought ideas from the community. A series of public hearings were held in late June and early July 1996 to determine what would be best for the new roadway. A predominant idea at the time for funding would call for a 1.5 percent hospitality tax, along with state funding, to finish the SC 22 and construct the Carolina Bays Parkway. In August, the committee made several recommendations. One proposed that instead of the $750 million cost associated with the entire parkway, only a portion would be built around N. Myrtle Beach to create a bypass around it costing $150 million. Some members of the task force and Myrtle Beach city council were concerned that the road would be built farther away from the traffic problem areas. Had the parkway not been built until years later, the costs would have increased dramatically due to future homes in Carolina Forest in the path of the roadway. Another issue with the road was how much traffic it would carry and how many lanes it should carry. The recommendation was given as two lanes with land available for a future six lanes. A later committee suggestion proposed four lanes. When the highway was finally built, it would be six lanes throughout.

When the Carolina Bays Parkway Task Force finished up its proposals on September 11, 1996, it asked for South Carolina to pay for $20 million per year in RIDE road projects and $15 million per year from the 1.5 percent proposed hospitality tax. The northern third of the parkway would be funded in a larger $550 million program. The following month, Horry County Council approved the hospitality tax for "Plan B" in an 8–3 vote. The tourism industry in Myrtle Beach was largely supportive of increasing the hospitality tax because area traffic was a large problem. The tax took effect in January 1997 and would end in twenty years.

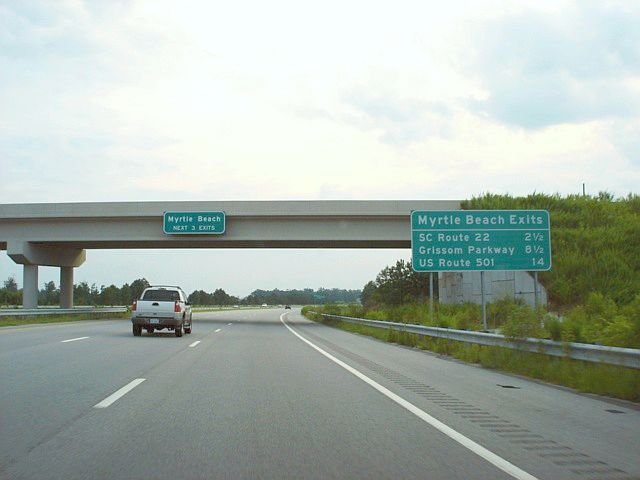
SC 31 near SC 22

The planning of the highway was not without controversy. Two lobbying groups, Taxpayers for Common Sense and Friends of the Earth, both argued against the need for the road from economic and environmental perspectives. Most of the traffic that the road was meant to alleviate would not be centered in the area; most of the Myrtle Beach traffic problems would be too far away and on the opposite side of the Intracoastal Waterway. Split off as part of a separate project, the road's plan called for a spur route to be built across the Waccamaw River to connect to US 701 from Socastee. If built, it would destroy approximately 300 acres (1.2 km^{2}) of wetlands on the river near Sandy Island. Near the road's southern terminus in Surfside Beach, the road's plan would also split and partially destroy the Holmestown community. Two options were presented to either continue the road as Holmestown Road or to build a road that intersects it and continues to US 17. David Farren, an environmental lawyer, argued that the Carolina Bays Parkway was a "developer's road" in the sense that it encouraged more "fringe" growth rather than allay current traffic problems.

Although the plan for funding for building the highway was approved by Horry County, the state would have to contribute funding in order to commence construction. On June 17, 1997, both the House of Representatives and Senate of South Carolina approved for funding and for a new program, the South Carolina Transportation Infrastructure Bank, to help pay for the state's portion of the Carolina Bays Parkway and Conway Bypass. The plan did not increase existing taxes from the state. Governor Beasley signed the bill on June 26 "that ended years of bitter disputes." In January 1998, the Joint Bond Review Committee approved the funding necessary for the Carolina Bays Parkway and other projects in Horry County. Wetlands mitigation began in March 1998 with the scaled-back version of the road affecting 60 less acres (240,000 m^{2}) than originally planned; 240 acres (0.97 km^{2}) of wetlands would finally be affected. A report by the U.S. Fish and Wildlife Service determined that the path would not disrupt endangered plants. The final route of the highway was approved on June 25, 1998, with approvals by South Carolina and the federal government later that year.

=== Phase I ===
Phase I consists of the highway from US 501 to SC 9, a length of 21.9 miles (35.2 km). In October 1999, a team was created by the South Carolina Department of Transportation named Palmetto Transportation Constructors to help with all aspects of the construction process of the first phase of the Carolina Bays Parkway. Included were nine firms, including Flatiron Structures Company of Longmont, Colorado, who were the primary construction firm. The road would tentatively be completed in 30 months at a cost of $232 million. Construction commenced in December 1999, two months behind schedule as permits were being issued.

The contract was signed on March 10, 2000, with a completion date of July 24, 2003. Most of the construction work was completed by November 2002. Although the road was meant to open in July of that year, delays came when constructing the overpass at Water Tower Road, requiring the dirt road to be relocated to the overpass. The interchange with Robert Grissom Parkway was to be opened as a partial interchange, with further study to be done on converting it into a full interchange with International Drive to connect to Carolina Forest. Before the official opening, many were using the road as an unofficial bypass around the highways in Myrtle Beach and as a faster route to deliver and remove materials for subdivisions in Carolina Forest. The first phase opened on December 17, 2002.

The North Myrtle Beach Connector runs from the Parkway between SC 22 and SC 9 east to Main Street in N. Myrtle Beach. This road, now known as Robert Edge Parkway, opened Sept. 3, 2009.

=== Phase II ===
Phase II was completed in March 2005 and follows a former logging road and a geographic ridge formation. A second bridge was built at the intersection with US 501.

=== Phase III ===
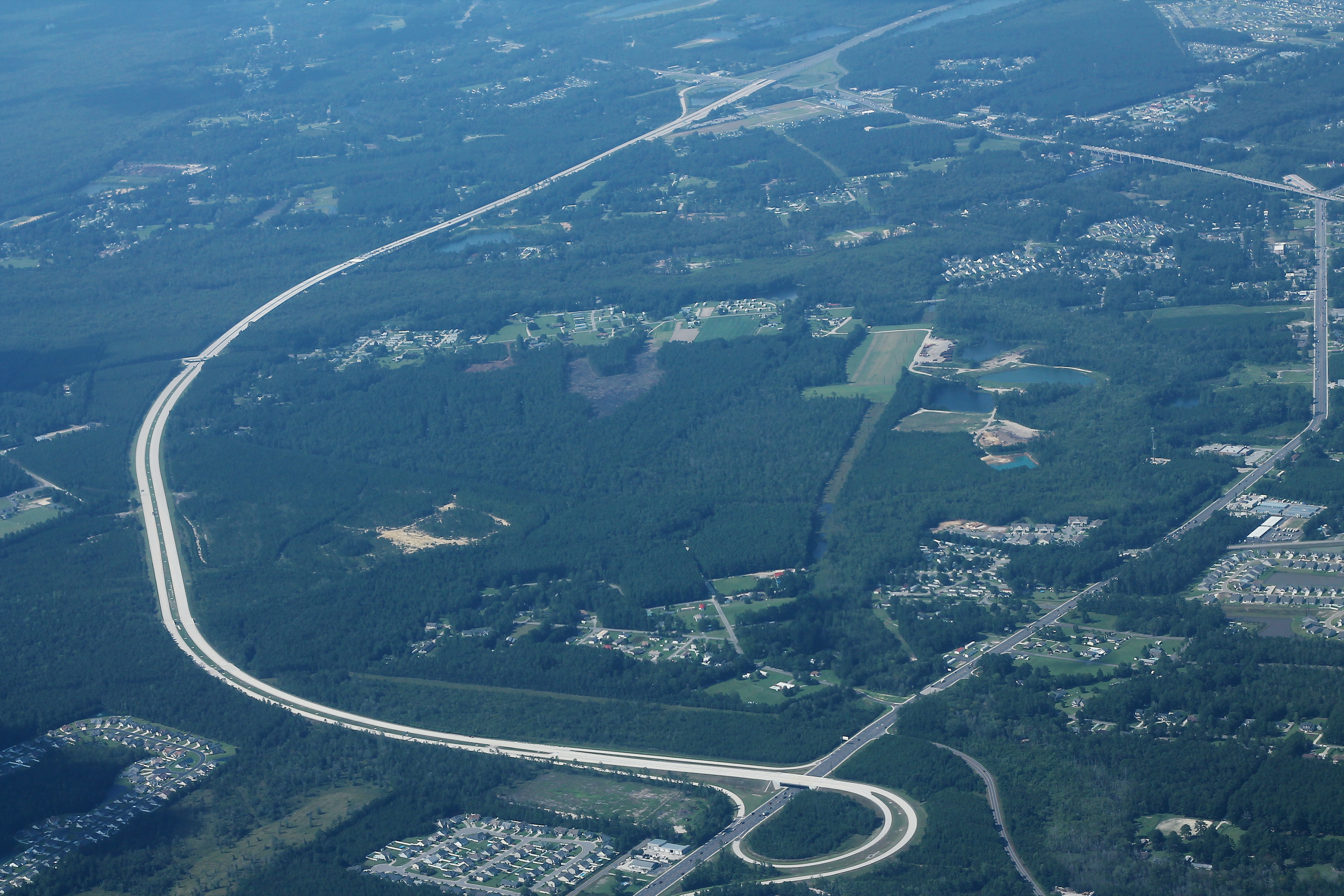
Aerial photo of recently opened phase 3

The completion of Phase III was completed and open to traffic November 7, 2019, taking it to SC 707. The third phase had been changed several times due to environmental issues concerning the surrounding area. This will be the future terminus of Interstate 74, as funding cannot allow for the possible extensions to Georgetown or Charleston that had once been planned in the early 1990s.

The change in the parkway's route meant more loss of wetlands and streams, though some wetland areas will be preserved. Project manager Mike Barbee said the goal was to award contracts by Fall 2010. The extension was delayed for two years after changes in the design, making the cost $15 million higher. The Coastal Conservation League objected to the changes, though the league denied being responsible for the delay. Illegal filling of wetlands in sections already completed was one reason. To get the project approved, the area of wetlands to be filled was reduced by 24 acres from the original plan.

A groundbreaking was held at the planned interchange between the parkway and S.C. 707 on November 6, 2013. Work was to start the next month on the 3.8-mile project, expected to cost between $225 and $237 million. Nearly all of the funding was to come from the State Infrastructure Bank, with $10 million in stimulus money and $2 million in sales tax money.

== Future ==
Future Interstate 74
- Location: Garden City-NC State Line

Interstate 74 (I-74) is a potential planned renumbering of SC 31, which could happen once the highway is extended north into North Carolina, connecting with US 17. Known as the northern extension, it would closely parallel County Road 57 in South Carolina. Between 2002 and 2004, State Sen. David Elliott opposed the efforts of State Rep. Tracy Edge to get the northern extension built, claiming the northeastern part of the county did not need such a highway, and that North Carolina had not set a definite route for Interstate 74 to which the road could connect. Currently, the northern extension is unfunded, waiting in part on NCDOT to finalize its routing of Interstate 74 in southeastern North Carolina.

In November 2019, NCDOT and SCDOT released maps of nine corridors that the northern extension could take. NCDOT currently has the extension of the highway under "Projects in developments," but only shows an extension into Brunswick County connecting to US 17 and does not mention of I-74. As of 2023 Horry County had the extension of SC 31 in their RIDE III projects. The extension project is currently estimated to cost $550 million with NCDOT paying about $360 million while South Carolina pays around $185 million. On April 22, 2026, NCDOT announced that it was considering new alternative routes and withdrawing their planned section of the extension into Brunswick County. Moreover, SCDOT plans to continue with their section of the extension.

In August 2026 Horry County authorized a southern extension of SC 31 to US 17 near Surfside Beach.

== Exit list ==
The entire highway is in Horry County.

Location	mi	km	Destinations	Notes
	0.000	0.000	SC 707 – Murrells Inlet, Georgetown, Socastee	Southern terminus
Socastee	3.767	6.062	SC 544 – Surfside Beach, Conway, Socastee	
Forestbrook–Carolina Forest line	8.407	13.530	US 501 – Myrtle Beach, Conway	Hybrid interchange
	14.224	22.891	Grissom Parkway / International Drive	Southbound two exits
	18.722	30.130	Watertower Road	
	20.211	32.526	SC 22 – Myrtle Beach, North Myrtle Beach, Conway	Full interchange; future Interstate 73; Myrtle Beach signed southbound; North Myrtle Beach signed northbound
	25.606	41.209	Robert Edge Parkway (SC 31 Conn.) to US 17 / SC 90 – Downtown N. Myrtle Beach, Wampee	
Little River	28.097	45.218	SC 9 to US 17 north – Loris, Dillon, Wilmington	Northern terminus
1.000 mi = 1.609 km; 1.000 km = 0.621 mi

== North Myrtle Beach connector route ==
South Carolina Highway 31 Connector
- Location: North Myrtle Beach, South Carolina
- Length: 2.300 mi (3.701 km)

South Carolina Highway 31 Connector (SC 31) is a 2.300-mile (3.701 km) connector route that uses Robert Edge Parkway from North Myrtle Beach. It serves to connect U.S. Route 17 (US 17), SC 31, and SC 90. It is an unsigned highway.

== See also ==
Interstate 74
Previous state: North Carolina	South Carolina	Next state: Terminus
