= South Carolina State Highway System =

Highway system of South Carolina in the United States

- Standard South Carolina route shields

System information
- Length: 41,500 mi (66,800 km)
- Notes: State roads maintained by the SCDOT

Highway names
- Interstates: Interstate X (I-X)
- US Highways: U.S. Highway X (US X)
- State: South Carolina Highway X (SC X)

System links
- South Carolina State Highway System; Interstate; US; State; Scenic

The South Carolina State Highway System is the fourth largest state-maintained system of state highways in the country. It consists of Interstates, U.S. highways, state highways, and secondary roads, totaling approximately 41,500 miles (66,800 km).

== History ==
=== Signage ===
Second shield design (1948-2006)

Variant shield design (1960s-'70s)

South Carolina Highways has had three major highway marker changes over its existence. The first signs used by the state featured an all white square with a black outline of the geographic state of South Carolina with black numbers located in the center. In 1948, a more simple design was established; still using a white square with just the numbers and the initials "S.C." at the top; a variant wider side was used for three-digit numbers. In the 1960s-1970s, an alternate was also used, which was a white square with "S. CAROLINA" partitioned at the top and number below.

On June 19, 2007, the South Carolina Department of Transportation Commission approved the change to the signs marking the primary state highways from the black-and-white to the blue-and-white design, which features an outline of the state, the palmetto tree and crescent symbol from the state flag, and the words "SOUTH CAROLINA" spelled out along on the top of the highway shield. South Carolina uses a wide shield for all routes, regardless of number of digits.

==== Secondary roads ====
South Carolina utilizes a numbering system to keep track of all non-interstate and primary highways that are maintained by SCDOT. First appearing in 1947 (when a huge amount of highways were cancelled or truncated), the "state highway secondary system" carries the number of the county followed by a unique number for the particular road. An example is S-11-154, which defines a secondary road in Cherokee County (11) with a road number of 154 (Whelchel Road). The counties are numbered in alphabetical order, with Abbeville as 1 and York as 46. Secondary road signs may either be integrated with a street name sign or appear separate as a black rectangle with white lettering.

== Toll roads ==
- Southern Connector - Tolled section of I-185, between I-385 and I-85, in Greenville County.

== Other routes and highways ==
- Mr. Joe White Avenue
- Harrelson Boulevard
- Robert Grissom Parkway
- Farrow Parkway
- Robert Edge Parkway
- Carolina Forest Boulevard
- Southern Evacuation Lifeline

== Ferry division ==
The South Carolina Department of Transportation Ferry Division a.k.a. South Carolina Ferry System is a branch of SCDOT that is responsible for the operation of over two dozen ferry services that transport passengers and vehicles to several islands along the James Island outside of Charleston in South Carolina.

two other inland, cable ferries continue in operation, under the oversight of the SCDOT.

=== Routes ===
- James Island–Charleston
- James Island–Mt. Pleasant
