= North Carolina Highway 87 =

State highway in North Carolina, US

North Carolina Highway 87

- Route of NC 87 highlighted in red

Route information
- Maintained by NCDOT
- Length: 236.8 mi (381.1 km)
- Existed: 1937–present

Major junctions
- South end: NC 211 in Southport
- US 17 near Bolivia; US 74 / US 76 in Sandy Creek; US 701 in Elizabethtown; I-95 / US 301 / I-95 BL in Fayetteville; US 1 / US 15 / US 501 / US 421 Bus. in Sanford; US 64 in Pittsboro; I-40 / I-85 in Burlington; US 70 / NC 54 in Burlington; US 29 / US 158 in Reidsville; US 311 / NC 14 / NC 770 in Eden
- North end: NC 14 / SR 87 at the Virginia state line near Eden

Location
- Country: United States
- State: North Carolina
- Counties: Brunswick, Columbus, Bladen, Cumberland, Harnett, Lee, Chatham, Alamance, Caswell, Rockingham

Highway system
- North Carolina Highway System; Interstate; US; State; Scenic
← I-87	→ NC 88

North Carolina Highway 87 (NC 87) is a primary state highway in the U.S. state of North Carolina. NC 87 begins in the Atlantic coastal town of Southport and crosses into Virginia at the Virginia state line five miles (8 km) north of Eden in Rockingham County. At 240 miles (390 km) in length, NC 87 is the second-longest state highway in the U.S. state of North Carolina with only North Carolina Highway 24 (NC 24) being longer. The longest north–south state highway, NC 87 travels along a relatively straight southeast–northwest path, connecting Cape Fear region with the Piedmont. It is also the main north-south route connecting the cities of Fayetteville, Sanford, Burlington and Reidsville.

== Route description ==
NC 87 is a four-lane, divided highway with at-grade crossings between Elizabethtown and Sanford with the exception of Fayetteville, where NC 87 is a freeway. Other sections that are four-lane, divided highways include concurrencies with US 17 and US 74/US 76 in Brunswick County.

In Sanford, it intersects US 421, on which users can travel east to Lillington, or northwest to Greensboro, and Winston-Salem. North of Sanford, NC 87 runs concurrent with US 15/US 501 to Pittsboro. It then continues towards Graham as a two-lane highway. It returns to four-lanes in southern Graham, returning to two-lane in downtown Graham. The route makes a left turn one block north of the Alamance County Courthouse, where it follows a two-lane road before making a right turn onto a four-lane street. The highway remains four-lane through downtown Burlington, returning to mostly two lanes for the remainder of its route in North Carolina, save for Reidsville, where it intersects US 29, and runs on four-lane commercial corridor Freeway Drive.

=== North Carolina Highway 303 ===
North Carolina Highway 303
- Location: Southport–Winnabow
- Length: 15.1 mi (24.3 km)
- Existed: 1930–October 23, 1952

North Carolina Highway 303 (NC 303) was a primary state highway in the U.S. state of North Carolina. Established as an original state highway, NC 303 was routed from NC 30, in Pollocksville, west through Trenton, before ending at NC 10/NC 11, in Kinston. In 1925, all of NC 303 was renumbered as part of NC 12. In 1930, NC 303 was resurrected as a new primary routing from NC 130 (now NC 211), near Southport, to NC 30 (became US 17 in late 1934), near Winnabow. On October 23, 1952, NC 303 was renumbered as an extension of NC 87.

== Major intersections ==
County	Location	mi	km	Destinations	Notes
Brunswick	Southport	0.0	0.0	NC 211 (Howe Street) – Supply	Southern terminus
Brunswick	Southport	1.3	2.1	NC 133 south (Long Beach Road) – Caswell Beach	South end of concurrency with NC 133
Brunswick	Boiling Spring Lakes	3.3	5.3	NC 133 north (River Road) – Belville	North end of concurrency with NC 133
Brunswick	Winnabow	15.2	24.5	US 17 south (Ocean Highway) – Bolivia, Shallotte	South end of concurrency with US 17
Brunswick	Bishop	18.6	29.9	US 17 north (Ocean Highway) to I-140 – Leland, Wilmington	North end of concurrency with US 17
Brunswick	Maco	27.9	44.9	US 74 / US 76 east (Andrew Jackson Highway) – Leland, Wilmington	South end of concurrency with US 74/US 76
Columbus	Delco	32.4	52.1	US 74 / US 76 west (Andrew Jackson Highway) – Bolton, Whiteville	North end of concurrency with US 74/US 76
Columbus	Sandyfield	38.4	61.8	NC 11 (General Howe Highway) – Bolton, Long View	
Bladen	Elizabethtown	62.7	100.9	NC 87 Bus. north (Broad Street)	Southern terminus of NC 87 Bus.
Bladen	Elizabethtown	64.7	104.1	US 701 / NC 242 – Clarkton, Bladenboro, White Lake, Roseboro	
Bladen	Elizabethtown	69.2	111.4	NC 41 north / NC 87 Bus. south – White Lake, Harrells	South end of concurrency with NC 41; Northern terminus of NC 87 Bus.
Bladen	Dublin	70.9	114.1	NC 41 south – Lumberton, Fairmont	North end of concurrency with NC 41
Bladen	Dublin	72.4	116.5	NC 410 south (3rd Street) – Bladenboro	Northern terminus of NC 410
Bladen	Tar Heel	79.2	127.5	NC 131 south – Bladenboro	Northern terminus of NC 131
Bladen	Tar Heel	84.2	135.5	NC 20 west – St. Pauls	Eastern terminus of NC 20
Cumberland	Fayetteville	97.9	157.6	I-95 north – Benson, Smithfield I-95 south – Lumberton, Florence	Cloverleaf interchange with Collector/distributor lanes; Exit 46
Cumberland	Fayetteville	100.3	161.4	Owen Drive	Diamond interchange
Cumberland	Fayetteville	102.0	164.2	I-95 BL / US 301 (Eastern Boulevard) – St. Pauls, Eastover	Partial cloverleaf interchange
Cumberland	Fayetteville	102.8	165.4	Gillespie Street	Partial cloverleaf interchange
Cumberland	Fayetteville	103.5	166.6	US 401 Bus. south (Robeson Street) – Raeford	South end of concurrency with US 401 Bus.; Partial cloverleaf interchange
Cumberland	Fayetteville	104.2	167.7	Hay Street	Diamond interchange
Cumberland	Fayetteville	104.7	168.5	US 401 Bus. north (Martin Luther King Jr. Freeway) / NC 24 east (Rowan Street) – Raleigh, Stedman	North end of concurrency with US 401 Bus.; South end of concurrency with NC 24; Diamond interchange
Cumberland	Fayetteville	108.6	174.8	US 401 (Skibo Road/Pamalee Drive) – Lumberton, Lillington	
Cumberland	Spring Lake	114.1	183.6	NC 210 south (Murchison Road) – Fayetteville	South end of concurrency with NC 210
Cumberland	Spring Lake	114.5	184.3	NC 210 north (Lillington Highway) – Lillington	North end of concurrency with NC 210
Cumberland	Spring Lake	116.7	187.8	NC 690 west (Vass Road) – Vass	Eastern terminus of NC 690
Harnett	Spout Springs	123.1	198.1	NC 24 west – Johnsonville, Cameron	North end of concurrency with NC 24; Partial cloverleaf interchange
Harnett	Pineview	126.5	203.6	NC 27 – Carthage, Lillington	Diamond interchange
Lee	Sanford	135.5	218.1	NC 87 Byp. north to US 421 – Raleigh, Pittsboro	
Lee	Sanford	137.0	220.5	US 421 Bus. south – Lillington	South end of concurrency with US 421 Bus.
Lee	Sanford	138.1	222.3	NC 42 east / NC 78 west (Main Street) – Fuquay-Varina	South end of concurrency with NC 42; Eastern terminus of NC 78
Lee	Sanford	140.7	226.4	US 1 Bus. / NC 42 west (Carthage Street) – Carbonton	North end of concurrency with NC 42
Lee	Sanford	141.9	228.4	US 1 south / US 15 south / US 501 south (Jefferson Davis Highway) / US 421 Bus. north (Horner Boulevard) – Cameron, Carthage, Goldston	South end of concurrency with US 1/15/501; North end of concurrency with US 421 Bus.; Partial cloverleaf interchange
Lee	Sanford	142.5	229.3	Burns Drive/Canterbury Road	Partial cloverleaf interchange; exit 69B on US 1
Lee	Sanford	143.0	230.1	US 421 (Oscar Keller Jr. Highway) / NC 87 Byp. south – Lillington, Siler City, Greensboro	Cloverleaf interchange; exit 70 on US 1
Lee	Sanford	144.2	232.1	US 1 north / US 1 Bus. south (Hawkins Avenue) – Moncure, Raleigh	North end of concurrency with US 1; Northern terminus of US 1 Bus.; Partial cloverleaf interchange
Chatham	Pittsboro	158.0	254.3	NC 902 west – Bear Creek	South end of concurrency with NC 902
Chatham	Pittsboro	158.9	255.7	US 64 Bus. / NC 902 ends (West Street)	Eastern terminus of NC 902; North end of concurrency with NC 902
Chatham	Pittsboro	160.8	258.8	US 15 north / US 64 / US 501 north – Siler City, Raleigh	North end of concurrency with US 15/US 501
Alamance	Graham	186.5	300.1	I-40 / I-85 – Winston-Salem, Greensboro, Hillsborough, Durham	Diamond interchange; exit 147 on I-85
Alamance	Graham	187.3	301.4	NC 49 north / NC 54 east (Harden Street) – Haw River, Durham	South end of concurrency with NC 49/NC 54
Alamance	Graham	187.8	302.2	NC 49 south / NC 54 west (Harden Street) – Liberty, Burlington	North end of concurrency with NC 49/NC 54
Alamance	Burlington	189.1	304.3	NC 100 east (Anthony Avenue)	South end of concurrency with NC 100
Alamance	Burlington	190.1– 190.3	305.9– 306.3	US 70 / NC 62 (Fisher and Church Streets) – Greensboro, Haw River, Julian, Pleasant Grove	One-way pair streets
Alamance	Burlington	192.8	310.3	NC 100 west (Haggard Avenue) – Whitsett	North end of concurrency with NC 100
Caswell	No major junctions				
Rockingham		208.1	334.9	NC 150 east – Yanceyville	East end of NC 150 concurrency
Rockingham	Williamsburg	209.2	336.7	NC 150 west – Oak Ridge	West end of NC 150 concurrency
Rockingham	Reidsville	212.9	342.6	US 29 – Greensboro, Danville, VA	Diamond interchange
Rockingham	Reidsville	214.4	345.0	US 29 Bus. south	South end of concurrency with US 29 Bus.
Rockingham	Reidsville	215.8	347.3	Front Street to US 158 west (Richardson Drive) – Monroeton	Partial cloverleaf interchange; South end of concurrency with US 158
Rockingham	Reidsville	217.9	350.7	US 29 Bus. north / US 158 east (Freeway Drive) / NC 65 east (Harrison Street) – Yanceyville, Roxboro	North end of concurrency with US 29 Bus. and US 158; South end of concurrency with NC 65; Diamond interchange
Rockingham	Wentworth	221.8	357.0	NC 65 west – Stokesdale	North end of concurrency with NC 65
Rockingham				US 311 south / NC 770 west / Old NC 87	South end of concurrency with US 311/NC 770
Rockingham	Eden	229.5	369.3	NC 14 south – Reidsville	South end of concurrency with NC 14
Rockingham	Eden	231.8	373.0	US 311 north / NC 700 east / NC 770 east (Meadow Road) – Stoneville, Pelham	Partial cloverleaf interchange; north end of concurrency with US 311/NC 770; western terminus of NC 700
Rockingham		236.8	381.1	SR 87 north (Morehead Avenue) – Ridgeway NC 14 ends	Northern terminus, Virginia state line; north end of concurrency with NC 14
1.000 mi = 1.609 km; 1.000 km = 0.621 mi: Concurrency terminus

== Special routes ==
=== Elizabethtown business loop ===
North Carolina Highway 87 Business
- Location: Elizabethtown, North Carolina
- Length: 6.4 mi (10.3 km)
- Existed: 1998–present

North Carolina Highway 87 Business (NC 87 Bus.), was established in 1997, when mainline NC 87 was moved south to bypass downtown Elizabethtown. NC 87 Business follows the original alignment along Broad Street.

The entire route is in Elizabethtown, Bladen County.

mi	km	Destinations	Notes
0.0	0.0	NC 87 – Fayetteville, Wilmington	
2.0	3.2	US 701 / NC 41 east (Poplar Street) / NC 242 – Clinton, Whiteville	East end of NC 41 overlap
6.4	10.3	NC 41 west / NC 87 – Fayetteville, Lumberton, Wilmington	West end of NC 41 overlap
1.000 mi = 1.609 km; 1.000 km = 0.621 mi: Concurrency terminus

=== Fayetteville alternate route 1 ===
North Carolina Highway 87A
- Location: Fayetteville, North Carolina
- Existed: 1944–1949

North Carolina Highway 87 Alternate (NC 87A), was established between 1940-44 as a new primary routing. It ran from US 15A/NC 87 (Hay Street) north along Robeson Street and then west along Fort Bragg Boulevard, recombining with mainline NC 87 on Fort Bragg Road. Sometime between 1945–49, it switched with mainline NC 87.

=== Fayetteville alternate route 2 ===
North Carolina Highway 87A
- Location: Fayetteville, North Carolina
- Existed: 1949–1957

North Carolina Highway 87 Alternate (NC 87A), was established between 1945–49, the second NC 87A in Fayetteville followed the original NC 87 alignment along Hay Street, Morganton Road, and Fort Bragg Road. The route was decommissioned between 1955-57.

=== Sanford bypass ===
North Carolina Highway 87 Bypass
- Location: Sanford, North Carolina
- Length: 8.0 mi (12.9 km)
- Existed: 2013–present

North Carolina Highway 87 Bypass (NC 87 By-pass) was established in 2013 as a new primary route along existing sections of the Sanford Bypass (formally SR 9000), from NC 87 to US 1/US 15/US 501. The request to establish a bypass was pushed by the Sanford City Council and Lee County. Typically, the old alignment would become a business loop, but instead the NC 87 mainline remained unchanged. The bypass is built as a freeway; which shares designation with US 421.
