= North Carolina Highway 41 =

State highway in North Carolina, US

North Carolina Highway 41

- Route of NC 41 highlighted in red

Route information
- Maintained by NCDOT
- Length: 141.1 mi (227.1 km)
- Existed: 1928–present

Major junctions
- South end: SC 41 at the South Carolina state line in Marietta
- I-74 / US 74 near Lumberton; US 701 / NC 242 / NC 87 Bus. in Elizabethtown; US 421 in Harrells; US 117 in Wallace; I-40 near Wallace; US 258 near Richlands
- East end: US 70 near Cove City

Location
- Country: United States
- State: North Carolina
- Counties: Robeson, Bladen, Sampson, Duplin, Jones, Craven

Highway system
- North Carolina Highway System; Interstate; US; State; Scenic
| ← I-40 | → I-42 |

North Carolina Highway 41 (NC 41) is a primary state highway in the U.S. state of North Carolina. The highway travels in a north–south orientation between the South Carolina state line to Lumberton, then switches to an east–west orientation connecting the cities and towns of Elizabethtown, White Lake, Harrells, Wallace, Beulaville and Trenton.

== History ==
NC 41 first appeared on North Carolina state transportation maps in 1929. Upon establishment, the highway began in Wallace and continued 1 mile (1.6 km) east to intersect US 17-1 and NC 40 in Tin City. The highway continued northeast for 20 miles (32 km) through Chinquapin before intersecting NC 24 in Beulaville. From Beulaville, NC 41 continued in an northeasterly direction for 27 miles (43 km) until ending at NC 12 west of Trenton. At the time of establishment, the entire roadway was a graded road. By December 1930, NC 41 was extended west by 14 miles (23 km) from Wallace to NC 60 south of Delway. The new section of NC 41 from NC 60 to Wallace was also a graded road. NC 41 was extended west once more by 1933. The highway followed a brief 1/2 mile (0.80 km) concurrency with US 421 and NC 60 to Harrells Store before turning west and travelling 21 miles (34 km) to its new terminus at US 701 and NC 23 in White Lake. Additionally, the segment of NC 41 between Wallace and Tin City was paved by 1933.

By 1935, NC 41 was extended west once more to the South Carolina state line. From the state line, the new alignment of NC 41 travelled north to Lumberton, replacing NC 70. In Lumberton it turned east, replacing NC 201 to Dublin, and then ran concurrently with NC 28 to Elizabethtown. In Elizabethtown, NC 41 began to run concurrently alongside US 701 until meeting its former terminus in White Lake. The entirety of the new alignment between South Carolina and White Lake was paved. The segment of NC 41 between US 421 near Harrells Store and US 117 near Wallace was also paved by 1935 and another segment between US 421 and the South River was upgraded to a topsoil, sand-clay, or gravel road. The segment west of the South River to US 701 was upgraded to a topsoil, sand-clay, or gravel road by 1936. The NC 28 and NC 41 concurrency between Dublin and Elizabethtown was replaced with a NC 41 and NC 87 concurrency in 1939 with no change to the routing of NC 41. By 1940, the highway was paved between Tin City and the Northeast Cape Fear River and along a section in Jones County between its eastern terminus and an area east of Comfort. The project to pave NC 41 in Jones County continued in the following years. The highway was paved between an area east US 258 and NC 12 by 1941 and by 1942 the paving project was completed to US 258. Paving east of Beulaville was complete by 1948 and the entire highway was paved by 1951.

NC 41 was rerouted between Tomahawk and Harrells by 1952 using its modern routing. Much of the former route became an extension of NC 411 while the remainder was downgraded to a secondary road known as Harrells Highway. By 1961, the highway was rerouted near Dublin to bypass the town to the south. The former route between NC 41 west of Dublin and NC 87 became a secondary roadway and the NC 41 and NC 87 concurrency was eliminated through Dublin. On June 4, 1970, NC 41 was realigned in Tin City continuing east from its intersection with NC 11. The realignment ended a short 0.8 miles (1.3 km) concurrency with NC 11 and a 0.2 miles (0.32 km) segment of NC 41 east of NC 11 became a secondary road. NCDOT rerouted NC 87 and NC 41 to follow a new bypass around Elizabethtown on June 15, 1998, leaving behind the routing along Broad Street. NC 41 was the follow the new highway, concurrent with NC 87 until reaching US 701 at an interchange. At the interchange, NC 41 was to turn and run concurrently with US 701 through Elizabethtown. NCDOT reversed the rerouting of NC 41 less than one month later, placing it along Broad Street concurrently with NC 87 Business, on July 10, 1998. Despite NCDOT rerouting NC 41 away from the bypass in Elizabethtown, no signage was updated to reflect the new routing. A second change to reroute NC 41 along NC 87 Business was request in 2013 and was approved in 2015. The request was approved on August 20, 2015. In Lumberton, NC 41 was realigned on September 29, 2006. The highway was removed from Pine Street between NC 72 and Elizabethtown Road, and Elizabethtown Road between Pine Street and NC 211. Instead, the highway was rerouted to run concurrently with NC 72 to NC 211, and then turn to run concurrently with NC 211 to Elizabethtown Road.

== Major intersections ==
| County | Location | mi | km | Destinations | Notes |
|---|---|---|---|---|---|
| Robeson | Marietta | 0.0 | 0.0 | SC 41 south – Lake View | South Carolina state line |
| Robeson | Marietta | 3.0 | 4.8 | NC 904 – Fair Bluff | |
| Robeson | Fairmont | 9.1 | 14.6 | NC 130 (Golf Course Road) – Rowland, Chadbourn | |
| Robeson | Fairmont | 9.7 | 15.6 | NC 130 Bus. east (Cottage Street) | South end of NC 130 Bus overlap |
| Robeson | Fairmont | 9.8 | 15.8 | NC 130 Bus. west (Iona Street) | North end of NC 130 Bus overlap |
| Robeson | Lumberton | 16.9 | 27.2 | I-74 / US 74 (Andrew Jackson Highway) – Laurinburg, Rockingham, Chadbourn, Whiteville | Diamond interchange |
| Robeson | Lumberton | 20.4 | 32.8 | NC 72 west (2nd Street) – Red Springs | South end of NC 72 overlap |
| Robeson | Lumberton | 20.9 | 33.6 | NC 72 east (2nd Street) – Orrum | North end of concurrency with NC 72 |
| Robeson | Lumberton | 22.3 | 35.9 | NC 211 (Roberts Avenue) to I-95 / US 301 – Bladenboro, Red Springs, Fayetteville | I-95/US 301, Exit 20 |
| Bladen | Dublin | 36.1 | 58.1 | NC 131 – Bladenboro, Tar Heel | |
| Bladen | Dublin | 37.4 | 60.2 | NC 410 – Bladenboro | |
| Bladen | Dublin | 39.1 | 62.9 | NC 87 north (Albert Street) – Tar Heel, Fayetteville | South end of NC 87 overlap |
| Bladen | Elizabethtown | 40.9 | 65.8 | NC 87 south / NC 87 Bus. – Delco | North end of NC 87 overlap; south end of NC 87 Bus overlap |
| Bladen | Elizabethtown | 45.3 | 72.9 | US 701 south / NC 242 south (Poplar Street) / NC 87 Bus. south (Broad Street) – Clarkton, Bladenboro | North end of NC 87 Bus overlap; south end of US 701 and NC 242 overlaps |
| Bladen | Suttons Corner | 46.6 | 75.0 | NC 53 west / NC 242 north – Roseboro, Fayetteville | North end of NC 242 overlap; south end of NC 53 overlap |
| Bladen | White Lake | 50.7 | 81.6 | NC 53 east – Atkinson | North end of NC 53 overlap |
| Bladen | White Lake | 52.6 | 84.7 | US 701 north – Garland | North end of US 701 overlap |
| Bladen | Smith Crossroads | 60.6 | 97.5 | NC 210 – St. Helena, Fayetteville | |
| Sampson | Harrells | 70.4 | 113.3 | NC 411 west (Harrells Highway) – Garland | South end of NC 411 overlap |
| Sampson | Harrells | 71.8 | 115.6 | US 421 / NC 411 (Delway & Wilmington Highways) – Wilmington, Delway | Eastern terminus of NC 411; north end of NC 411 overlap |
| Duplin | Wallace | 85.2 | 137.1 | US 117 (Norwood Street) – Burgaw, Teachey | |
| Duplin | Wallace | 86.2 | 138.7 | NC 11 – Atkinson, Kenansville | |
| Duplin | Wallace | 88.1 | 141.8 | I-40 – Kenansville, Burgaw | Diamond interchange; I-40, exit 385 |
| Duplin | Chinquapin | 96.5 | 155.3 | NC 50 north – Kenansville | South end of NC 50 overlap |
| Duplin | Chinquapin | 98.4 | 158.4 | NC 50 south – Holly Ridge | North end of NC 50 overlap |
| Duplin | Chinquapin | 99.3 | 159.8 | NC 111 south – Catherine Lake | South end of NC 111 overlap |
| Duplin | Beulaville | 105.7 | 170.1 | NC 24 (Main Street) – Kenansville, Richlands | |
| Duplin | Beulaville | 106.0 | 170.6 | NC 111 north / NC 241 north – Goldsboro, Pink Hill | North end of NC 111 overlap; southern terminus of NC 241 |
| Jones | | 115.6 | 186.0 | US 258 – Richlands, Kinston | |
| Jones | Trenton | 131.5 | 211.6 | NC 58 north – Kinston | South end of NC 58 overlap |
| Jones | Trenton | 134.4 | 216.3 | NC 58 south – Maysville | North end of NC 58 overlap |
| Craven | Cove City | 141.1 | 227.1 | US 70 – Kinston, New Bern | Diamond interchange |
1.000 mi = 1.609 km; 1.000 km = 0.621 mi: Concurrency terminus

== See also ==
- North Carolina Bicycle Route 5-concurrent with NC 41 along its US 701 concurrency from Sweet Home Church Road to NC 55 near White Lake
