= North Carolina Highway 410 =

State highway in North Carolina, US

North Carolina Highway 410

Route information
- Maintained by NCDOT
- Length: 39.6 mi (63.7 km)
- Existed: 1936–present

Major junctions
- South end: SC 410 at the South Carolina state line in Tabor City
- US 701 in Tabor City; US 76 / US 74 Bus. / US 76 Bus. / NC 130 in Chadbourn; US 74 / NC 130 near Chadbourn
- North end: NC 87 in Dublin

Location
- Country: United States
- State: North Carolina
- Counties: Columbus, Bladen

Highway system
- North Carolina Highway System; Interstate; US; State; Scenic
← NC 403	→ NC 411

North Carolina Highway 410 (NC 410) is a primary state highway in the U.S. state of North Carolina. It serves as the central north–south highway in Columbus and Bladen Counties.

== Route description ==
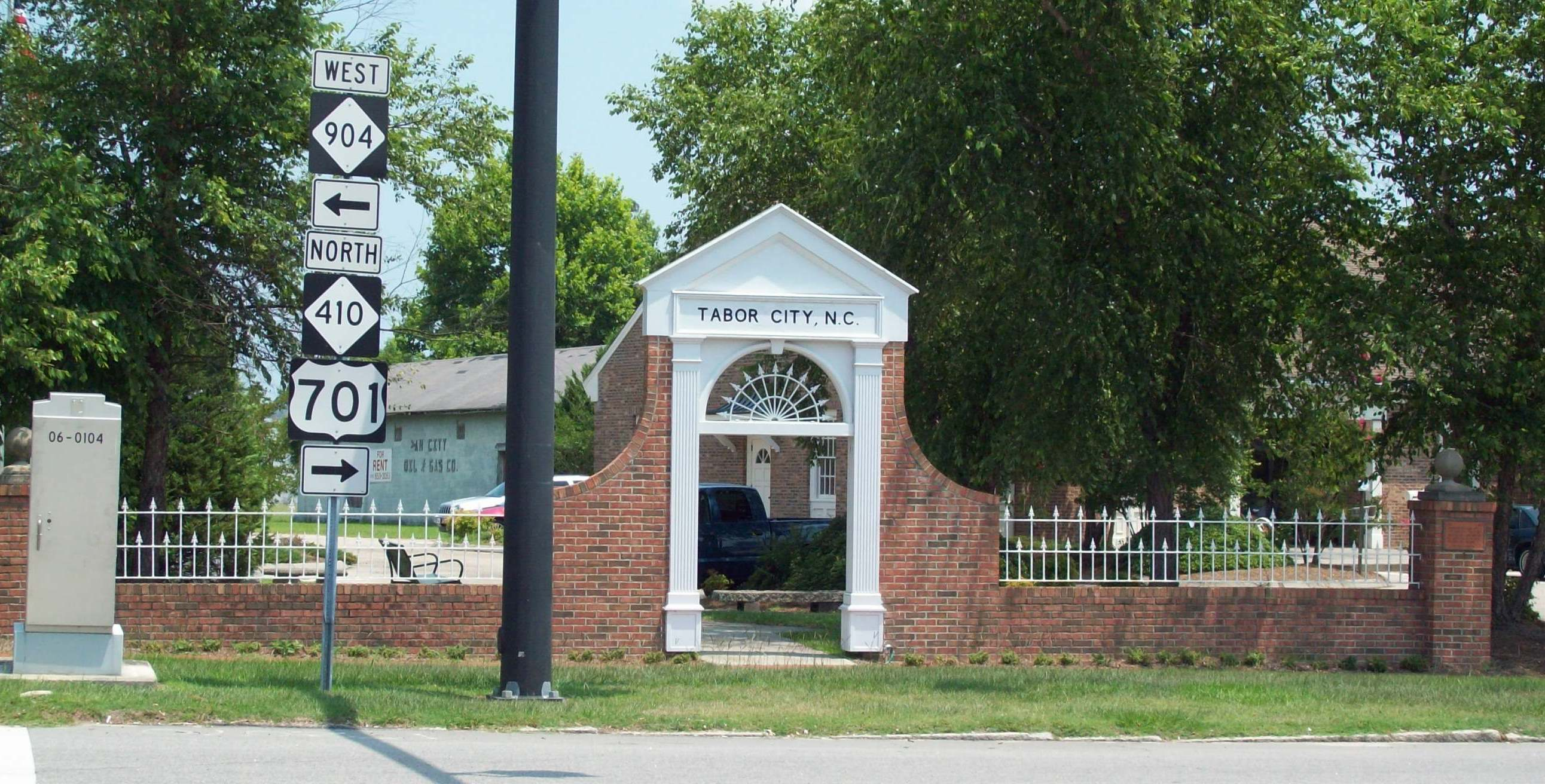
Tabor City's Welcome Arch

NC 410 is a predominantly two-lane rural highway that begins at the South Carolina state line and traverses north through downtown Tabor City, mostly along a concurrency with US 701 Business and briefly with NC 904. Heading north, it briefly overlaps with US 701 in the East Tabor area before continuing solo along Joe Brown Highway to Chadbourn. Along Strawberry Boulevard, NC 410 shares a concurrency with US 74 Business, US 76 Business, and NC 130. As it continues north it sheds each other highway off as it travels through northern Columbus County, crossing into Bladen County just after passing through Hickmans Crossroads.

As NC 410 approaches Bladenboro, it begins another concurrency series, starting with NC 242. As it enters the Bladenboro city limits, it also joins with NC 131 before going through Main Street. After crossing over railroad tracks, it meets with NC 121 Business (Seaboard Street), then soon after splits left from NC 242. As NC 410 leaves Bladenboro, it crosses paths with NC 211 Bypass. 5 miles (8.0 km) later, it splits from NC 131, which continues north to Tar Heel. As it approaches Dublin, it crosses NC 41 and passes Bladen Community College. NC 410 enters Dublin along Third Street and ends at NC 87 (Albert Street).

== History ==
NC 410 was established in 1936 as a new primary routing from US 74/US 76 in Chadbourn to NC 41/NC 87 in Dublin. By 1938, NC 410 was extended south as new primary routing to US 701 in Tabor City. In 1949, NC 410 was extended to the South Carolina state line, replacing US 701, and continuing south as SC 410.

== Junction list ==
County	Location	mi	km	Destinations	Notes
Columbus	Tabor City	0.0	0.0	SC 410 east – Conway	South Carolina state line
Columbus	Tabor City	0.5	0.80	US 701 Bus. south (Hickman Street) – Loris, Conway	South end of US 701 Bus overlap
Columbus	Tabor City	0.7	1.1	NC 904 west (Main Street) – Fair Bluff, Rowland	South end of NC 904 overlap
Columbus	Tabor City	0.9	1.4	NC 904 east (Pireway Road) / Stake Road	North end of NC 904 overlap
Columbus	Tabor City	1.9	3.1	US 701 south / US 701 Bus. ends – Loris, Conway	South end of US 701 and north end of US 701 Bus overlaps
Columbus	Tabor City	2.6	4.2	US 701 north – Whiteville	North end of US 701 overlap
Columbus	Chadbourn	15.0	24.1	US 74 Bus. / US 76 Bus. / NC 130 east (Strawberry Boulevard) – Whiteville	South end of US 74 Bus/US 76 Bus/NC 130 overlaps
Columbus	Chadbourn	15.3	24.6	US 76 / US 76 Bus. ends – Whiteville, Fair Bluff	North end of US 76 Bus overlap
Columbus		17.0	27.4	US 74 / NC 130 west / US 74 Bus. ends – Whiteville, Laurinburg	North end of US 74 Bus/NC 130 overlap; exit 233 (US 74)
Bladen		27.5	44.3	NC 242 – Evergreen, Boardman	South end of NC 242 overlap
Bladen	Bladenboro	29.9	48.1	NC 131 south (Whiteville Road) – Whiteville	South end of NC 131 overlap
Bladen	Bladenboro	30.5	49.1	NC 211 Bus. (Seaboard Street)	
Bladen	Bladenboro	30.7	49.4	NC 242 north – Elizabethtown	North end of NC 242 overlap
Bladen	Bladenboro	31.4	50.5	NC 211 – Clarkton, Lumberton	
Bladen		36.3	58.4	NC 131 north – Tar Heel	North end of NC 131 overlap
Bladen		38.4	61.8	NC 41 – Elizabethtown, Lumberton	
Bladen	Dublin	39.6	63.7	NC 87 (Albert Street) – Elizabethtown, Fayetteville	
1.000 mi = 1.609 km; 1.000 km = 0.621 mi: Concurrency terminus
