= North Carolina Highway 242 =

State highway in North Carolina, US

North Carolina Highway 242

- Route of NC 242 highlighted in red

Route information
- Maintained by NCDOT
- Length: 94.2 mi (151.6 km)
- Existed: 1930–present
- Tourist routes: Meteor Lakes Byway

Major junctions
- South end: US 76 in Cerro Gordo
- US 74 / NC 130 near Evergreen; NC 87 / US 701 in Elizabethtown; US 421 near Spivey's Corner; US 13 in Spivey's Corner; I-95 / NC 50 in Benson; US 301 / NC 27 / NC 50 in Benson
- North end: I-40 near Benson

Location
- Country: United States
- State: North Carolina
- Counties: Columbus, Bladen, Cumberland, Sampson, Johnston

Highway system
- North Carolina Highway System; Interstate; US; State; Scenic
← NC 241	→ NC 251

North Carolina Highway 242 (NC 242) is a primary state highway in the U.S. state of North Carolina. It traverses from Cerro Gordo to Benson, connecting the towns of Bladenboro, Elizabethtown, and Roseboro.

== Route description ==
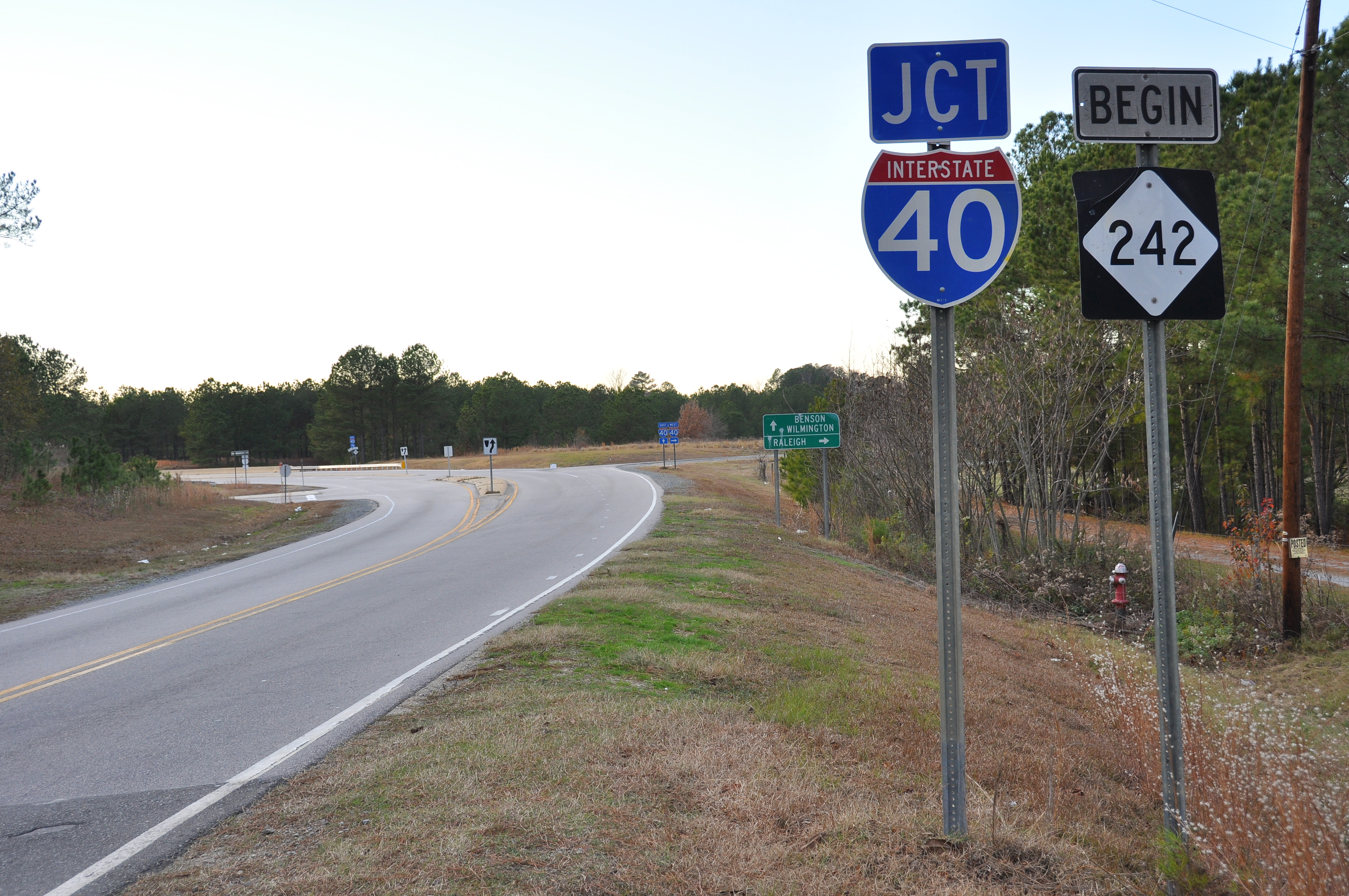
Begin of NC 242 at I-40

NC 242 is a 94.2-mile (151.6 km) long rural highway that goes from US 76 in Cerro Gordo, to I-40, near Benson. It passes through Columbus, Bladen, Cumberland, Sampson and Johnston Counties. Some major cities, and towns it goes through are Cerro Gordo, Bladenboro, Elizabethtown, Roseboro, Spiveys Corner and Benson.

Although it passes through the southeastern tip of Cumberland County, it never goes near Fayetteville.

== History ==
NC 242 was established in 1930 as a new primary route between NC 24, in Roseboro, and NC 60, in Beamans Crossroads. In 1937, NC 242 was extended south as new primary routing to US 701/NC 41/NC 53, near Elizabethtown. In 1940, NC 242 was rerouted at Salemburg north to US 421, its old alignment became Odom Road (SR 1323). Around 1946, NC 242 was extended southwest as new primary routing to NC 410, in Bladenboro. In 1948, NC 242 was extended to its current southern terminus at US 76, in Cerro Gordo. In 1952, NC 242 was extended north to NC 50, in Benson. In 1988, NC 242 was extended north, through Benson, to its current northern terminus at I-40.

== Major intersections ==
County	Location	mi	km	Destinations	Notes
Columbus	Cerro Gordo	0.0	0.0	US 76 / Powell Street – Chadbourn, Fair Bluff	Southern terminus
Columbus	Evergreen	5.6	9.0	US 74 / NC 130 – Whiteville, Lumberton	Future I-74
Bladen		16.9	27.2	NC 410 south – Chadbourn	South end of NC 410 overlap
Bladen	Bladenboro	19.2	30.9	NC 131 south (Whiteville Road) / White Street – Whiteville	South end of NC 131 overlap
Bladen	Bladenboro	19.8	31.9	NC 211 Bus. (Seaboard Street)	
Bladen	Bladenboro	19.9	32.0	NC 131 north / NC 410 north (Main Street) – Dublin	North end of NC 131 / NC 410 overlap
Bladen		21.0	33.8	NC 211 (CDR Frank Elkins Memorial Highway) – Clarkton, Lumberton	
Bladen		31.1	50.1	US 701 south – Whiteville	South end of US 701 overlap
Bladen		31.3	50.4	NC 87 – Fayetteville, Southport	
Bladen	Elizabethtown	33.2	53.4	NC 41 south / NC 87 Bus. (Broad Street) – Fayetteville, Southport	South end of NC 41 overlap
Bladen	Sutton's Corner	34.5	55.5	US 701 north / NC 41 north / NC 53 east – White Lake	North end of US 701 / NC 41 and south end of NC 53 overlap
Bladen	Sutton's Corner	34.6	55.7	NC 53 west – Fayetteville	North end of NC 53 overlap
Cumberland		51.8	83.4	NC 210 – Fayetteville, Moores Creek	
Sampson		57.3	92.2	NC 411 east – Garland	Western terminus of NC 411
Sampson	Roseboro	59.0	95.0	NC 24 (Fayetteville Highway) – Fayetteville, Clinton	
Sampson		72.7	117.0	US 421 south – Clinton	South end of US 421 overlap
Sampson	Spivey's Corner	76.7	123.4	US 13 – Fayetteville, Goldsboro	
Sampson	Spivey's Corner	77.7	125.0	US 421 north – Dunn	North end of US 421 overlap
Johnston	McKoy	81.5	131.2	NC 55 (Harnett-Dunn Highway) – Dunn, Newton Grove	
Johnston	Benson	90.2	145.2	I-95 to I-40 / NC 50 south (Main Street) – Newton Grove, Dunn, Smithfield	South end of NC 50 overlap
Johnston	Benson	90.9	146.3	US 301 south (Wall Street) / NC 27 west / NC 50 north (Main Street) – Campbell University	North end of NC 50 and south end of US 301 overlap
Johnston	Benson	91.5	147.3	US 301 north (Wall Street) – Four Oaks, Smithfield	North end of US 301 overlap
Johnston		94.2	151.6	I-40 – Wilmington, Raleigh	Northern terminus
Johnston		94.2	151.6	Woodall Dairy Road	Continuation beyond I-40
1.000 mi = 1.609 km; 1.000 km = 0.621 mi: Concurrency terminus

== Special routes ==
=== Roseboro truck route ===
North Carolina Highway 242 Truck
- Location: Roseboro, North Carolina
- Length: 1.0 mi (1.6 km)

North Carolina Highway 242 Truck (NC 242 Truck) is a short 1-mile-long (1.6 km) truck route through Roseboro, via Pinewood Street and East Street.

=== Roseboro alternate spur ===
North Carolina Highway 242A
- Location: Roseboro, North Carolina
- Length: 0.2 mi (320 m)
- Existed: 1939–1977

North Carolina Highway 242 Alternate (NC 242A) was established in 1939 as a new alternate spur, creating a cutoff between NC 242 and NC 24, in Roseboro. It is unclear when NC 242A was decommissioned, from its still appearing on Sampson County maps as late as 1968, to links of missing documents located on NCDOT's website, indicated it may have been as late as 1977. Today it is East Roseboro Street.

== See also ==
- North Carolina Bicycle Route 5 - Concurrent with NC 242 from Sweet Home Church Road to Ammon Community Center Road in Bladen County
