= North Carolina Highway 131 =

State highway in North Carolina, US

North Carolina Highway 131

Route information
- Maintained by NCDOT
- Length: 24.5 mi (39.4 km)
- Existed: 1949–present

Major junctions
- South end: US 701 near Whiteville
- North end: NC 87 in Tar Heel

Location
- Country: United States
- State: North Carolina
- Counties: Columbus, Bladen

Highway system
- North Carolina Highway System; Interstate; US; State; Scenic
← NC 130	→ NC 132

North Carolina Highway 131 (NC 131) is a primary state highway in the U.S. state of North Carolina. It connects the city of Bladenboro to Fayetteville, via NC 87, and Whiteville, via US 701.

== Route description ==
NC 131 is a two-lane rural highway that begins at US 701 north of Whiteville. In Bladenboro, it shares concurrencies with NC 242 and NC 410 along its Main Street crossing NC 211 Business at Seaboard Street. It soon splits from NC 242, which continues north to Elizabethtown, followed by crossing NC 211 By-Pass, before leaving Bladenboro. Five miles (8.0 km) later, it splits from NC 410, which continues north to Dublin. At NC 41, NC 131 has a brief .1-mile (0.16 km) overlap; it is noticeable that the routing here was reconfigured to slowdown NC 131 at this location. At the end of its journey, NC 131 meets with NC 87, in Tar Heel; where travelers can continue on to Fayetteville or Elizabethtown.

NC 131 goes through predominantly forested or farmlands in the area, with Bladenboro being the only urban location along its route.

== History ==
NC 131 was established in 1949 as a new primary routing from US 701 north of Whiteville to NC 87 in Tar Heel. In 1970, NC 131 was rerouted onto a new road east of downtown Tar Heel. In 2015, NC 131 was realigned on new road and brief overlap with NC 41, eliminating an intersection; old alignment was downgraded to secondary roads, with some partial removal of roadway.

== Junction list ==
County	Location	mi	km	Destinations	Notes
Columbus		0.0	0.0	US 701 (James B. White Highway) – Clarkton, Whiteville	
Bladen	Bladenboro	9.2	14.8	NC 242 / NC 410 south (Main Street) – Chadbourn, Evergreen, Boardman	South end of NC 242/NC 410 overlap
Bladen	Bladenboro	9.8	15.8	NC 211 Bus. (Seaboard Street)	
Bladen	Bladenboro	10.0	16.1	NC 242 north – Elizabethtown	North end of NC 242 overlap
Bladen	Bladenboro	10.7	17.2	NC 211 – Clarkton, Lumberton	
Bladen		15.6	25.1	NC 410 north – Dublin	North end of NC 410 overlap
Bladen		17.4	28.0	NC 41 west – Lumberton	West end of NC 41 overlap
Bladen		17.5	28.2	NC 41 east – Elizabethtown	East end of NC 41 overlap
Bladen	Tar Heel	24.5	39.4	NC 87 – Elizabethtown, Fayetteville	
1.000 mi = 1.609 km; 1.000 km = 0.621 mi: Concurrency terminus
