= North Carolina Highway 211 =

State highway in North Carolina, US

North Carolina Highway 211

- Route of NC 211 highlighted in red

Route information
- Maintained by NCDOT
- Length: 162.5 mi (261.5 km)
- Existed: 1921–present
- Tourist routes: Green Swamp Byway

Major junctions
- South end: US 421 / Fort Fisher-Southport Ferry in Fort Fisher
- US 17 in Supply; US 74 / US 76 near Bolton; US 701 in Clarkton; I-95 / US 301 in Lumberton; US 401 in Raeford; US 15 / US 501 in Aberdeen; US 1 in Aberdeen; I-73 / I-74 / US 220 in Candor
- North end: US 220 Alt. / NC 731 in Candor

Location
- Country: United States
- State: North Carolina
- Counties: New Hanover, Brunswick, Columbus, Bladen, Robeson, Hoke, Moore, Montgomery

Highway system
- North Carolina Highway System; Interstate; US; State; Scenic
← NC 210	→ NC 212

North Carolina Highway 211 (NC 211) is a 162.5-mile-long (261.5 km) primary state highway in the U.S. state of North Carolina. It traverses mostly through the Sandhills and Coastal Plain regions of the state; connecting the cities of Candor, Aberdeen, Raeford, Lumberton, Bladenboro, and Southport.

== Route description ==
NC 211 is predominantly a two-lane rural highway that traverses for 158.4 miles (254.9 km) in a diagonal northwesterly route. Its southern terminus is at US 421, via the Fort Fisher Ferry Terminal, in Fort Fisher. Crossing the Cape Fear River on the Fisher-Southport Ferry, travelers enter the town of Southport; where the highway first goes through the downtown area before begins its northwesterly direction to Supply, where it connects with US 17.

Now going on an almost due north direction, it passes through the Green Swamp Preserve, reaching the town of Bolton, where it connects with US 74 and US 76. This section of highway may one day be paralleled by a future segment of I-74.

Returning to a north-westerly direction, it goes through Clarkton (connecting with US 701) and makes a bypass north of Bladenboro before reaching the biggest city along its route, Lumberton. In Lumberton, it follows Roberts Avenue, as it bypasses the downtown area; at the north-end of Lumberton, it connects with I-95/US 301.

North of Red Springs, the highway designations change from north–south to east–west direction; though it continues to go on an almost northerly route through Raeford (connecting with US 401), passing along the western edge of Fort Bragg, and Aberdeen (connecting with US 1/US 15/US 501), until it reaches the Pinehurst traffic circle in Pinehurst. After the traffic circle, NC 211 goes on a more westerly direction, it traverses through West End and Eagle Springs, before ending at its western terminus in Candor (connecting with I-73/I-74/US 220).

== History ==
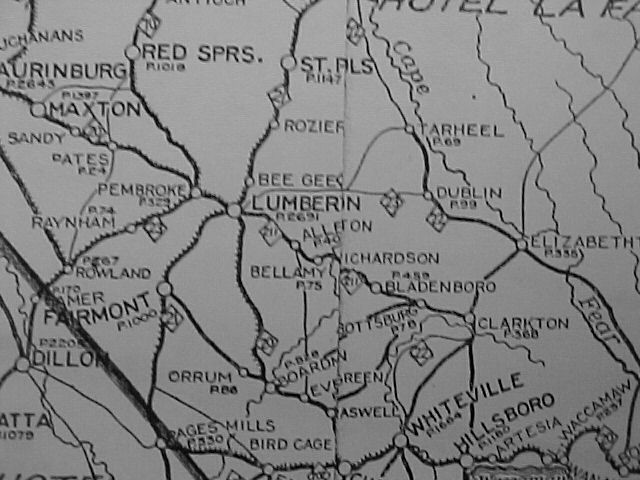
NC 211's original routing through the Lumberton area is shown on this 1922 map.

Established in 1921 as an original state highway, traversing from NC 23 (today US 701 Bus), in Clarkton, to NC 20 (today NC 72), in Lumberton. In 1930, it was extended south as a new primary routing to US 17/NC 20 (today NC 214), in Bolton. In 1932, it extended north as a new primary routing to NC 70 (today NC 72), in Red Springs. By 1935, its northern terminus was extended again to Aberdeen, replacing NC 70. In 1940, its third northern extension was made, overlapping with US 15/US 501 through Aberdeen, then replacing NC 2 to its current terminus in Candor.

In the late 1940s, NC 211's route was realigned from Main Street to South Street, in Aberdeen; some of the former routing became part of NC 5. During the early 1950s, NC 211 made a fourth extension north in Candor, replacing US 220 on Pack House Road; this lasted until June, 1963 where it was moved back to its former and current northern terminus.

In the mid-1950s, NC 211 made the following adjustments: at Eagle Springs, it was placed on new construction bypassing north of the community, its old alignment becoming Eagle Springs Road (SR 1138). In Bolton, it was removed from Old 211 (SR 1805) and extended south on new primary routing to US 17/NC 130, in Supply. And in Lumberton, it was moved onto its current alignment on Roberts Avenue, its old alignment becoming NC 211A (later becoming NC 211 Business).

In 1957, NC 211 was extended south, overlapping with NC 130, into Southport (at Moore Street). Between 1958-1962, various alignment changes were made along the route at Antioch and Seven Lakes. Also around 1961, NC 211 was rerouted with US 15/US 501 between Aberdeen and Pinehurst to the roundabout, then onto new primary routing that avoided central Pinehurst; the old alignment became part of NC 5. In 1969, NC 211 was placed on new routing west of the McCain community, leaving Old NC 211 (SR 1318).

In 1972, NC 211 was placed on new alignment north between Butters and Bladenboro, the old alignment became secondary road (SR 1134). In 1975, more of NC 211 was placed on new alignment north and east of Bladenboro, its old alignment through town becoming NC 211 Business (which also incorporated the former section displaced in 1972).

Around 1990, NC 211 was extended to its current southern terminus at the Southport Ferry Terminal, after upgrades were made on Moore Street and Ferry Road. On June 6, 2013, NC 211 was extended east over the Cape Fear River, via the Fort Fisher-Southport Ferry, to Fort Fisher and US 421. Justification for the change was to have the highway end at another primary route and to incorporate the ferry route into a marine highway, which will expedite dredging operations in emergency situations.

== Future ==
In January 2022, NC DOT undertook a major project to widen NC 211 into a divided, four-lane highway from Midway Road (NC 906) to NC 87 in Southport. Involving roughly 7 miles of roadway, the project entails constructing overpasses at Long Beach Road Extension and Midway Road/Middleton Boulevard and replacing bridges at Dutchman’s Creek and the Duke Energy Progress discharge canal. The road will remain open during construction which is expected to cost $85-million and take some four years. Further inland, widening of NC 211 between Holly Grove School Rd. and NC 73 in Moore County is under progress. Albeit originally intended to be completed in time for the 2024 USGA Open scheduled to be held that year in Pinehurst, construction is still ongoing as of October 2025.

== Junction list ==
County	Location	mi	km	Destinations	Notes
New Hanover	Fort Fisher	0.0	0.0	US 421 – Wilmington	Southern terminus
Brunswick	Cape Fear River	0.1	0.16	Fort Fisher-Southport Ferry	
Brunswick	Southport	7.7	12.4	NC 87 north (River Road) – Wilmington	Southern terminus of NC 87
Brunswick		9.4	15.1	NC 133 (Long Beach Road) – Wilmington, Oak Island, Fort Caswell	
Brunswick	Midway	14.3	23.0	NC 906 (Middleton Boulevard / Midway Road) – Oak Island	
Brunswick	Supply	23.3	37.5	US 17 (Ocean Highway) – Shallotte, Wilmington	
Columbus	Bolton	47.7	76.8	NC 214 (Sam Potts Highway) – Lake Waccamaw, Leland, Wilmington	
Columbus	Bolton	48.8	78.5	US 74 / US 76 – Whiteville, Wilmington	
Bladen	Clarkton	67.6	108.8	US 701 Bus. (College Street)	
Bladen	Clarkton	67.9	109.3	US 701 (NWR Latham Street) – Whiteville, Elizabethtown	
Bladen		74.7	120.2	NC 211 Bus. north (Martin Luther King Jr Drive) – Bladenboro	
Bladen	Bladenboro	75.9	122.1	NC 242 (Elizabethtown Road) – Elizabethtown	
Bladen	Bladenboro	76.7	123.4	NC 131 / NC 410 (Main Street) – Dublin, Tarheel	
Bladen	Butters	80.6	129.7	NC 211 Bus. south (Seaboard Street) – Bladenboro	
Robeson	Lumberton	88.8	142.9	NC 72 (Robeson Avenue/Fifth Street) – Lumberton	
Robeson	Lumberton	90.4	145.5	NC 41 (Elizabethtown Road) – Elizabethtown	
Robeson	Lumberton	91.1	146.6	Fayetteville Road	
Robeson	Lumberton	92.0	148.1	I-95 / US 301 – Fayetteville, Rowland	
Robeson	Red Springs	107.5	173.0	NC 72 east / NC 710 east (Main Street) – Lumberton, Rowland	
Robeson	Red Springs	107.6	173.2	NC 71 south (Third Avenue) – Maxton	South end of NC 71 overlap
Robeson	Red Springs	108.3	174.3	NC 71 north – Lumber Bridge, Parkton	North end of NC 71 overlap
Hoke	Raeford	119.3	192.0	US 401 Bus. south (Harris Avenue) – Laurinburg	South end of US 401 Business overlap
Hoke	Raeford	119.4	192.2	US 401 Bus. north / NC 20 east (Central Avenue) – Fayetteville, Saint Pauls	North end of US 401 Business overlap
Hoke	Raeford	120.5	193.9	To US 401 / Teal Drive – Laurinburg, Fayetteville	
Moore	Aberdeen	136.4	219.5	US 15 south / US 501 south – Laurinburg	South end of US 15/US 501 overlap
Moore	Aberdeen	136.7	220.0	US 1 south (Sandhills Boulevard) – Rockingham	South end of US 1 overlap
Moore	Aberdeen	136.9	220.3	NC 5 (South Street) – Pinehurst	
Moore	Aberdeen	138.5	222.9	US 1 north (Sandhills Boulevard) – Sanford	North end of US 1 overlap
Moore	Pinehurst	142.4	229.2	US 15 north / US 501 north / NC 2 (Midland Road) – Southern Pines, Carthage, Pinehurst	Roundabout; north end of US 15/US 501 overlap
Moore	Pinehurst	144.5	232.6	NC 5 south (Beulah Hill Road) – Pinehurst, Aberdeen	
Moore	West End	150.3	241.9	NC 73 west – Ellerbe	West end of NC 73 overlap
Moore	West End	150.5	242.2	NC 73 east – Carthage	East end of NC 73 overlap
Moore	Eagle Springs	156.0	251.1	NC 705 north – Robbins	
Montgomery	Candor	161.5	259.9	I-73 / I-74 / US 220 – Asheboro, Rockingham	
Montgomery	Candor	162.5	261.5	US 220 Alt. / NC 731 west – Biscoe, Rockingham, Mount Gilead	Northern terminus
1.000 mi = 1.609 km; 1.000 km = 0.621 mi: Concurrency terminus

== Special routes ==
=== Lumberton alternate spur ===
North Carolina Highway 211A
- Location: Lumberton, North Carolina
- Length: 0.3 mi (480 m)
- Existed: 1949–1957

North Carolina Highway 211 Alternate (NC 211A) was established by 1949 as a spur route that connected with US 301 (Pine Street) with mainline NC 211 (Elm Street) along 24th Street. In 1957, the alternate route was decommissioned when NC 211 was bypassed north of Lumberton.

=== Lumberton alternate route ===
North Carolina Highway 211A
- Location: Lumberton, North Carolina
- Length: 3.4 mi (5.5 km)
- Existed: 1957–1960

North Carolina Highway 211 Alternate (NC 211A) was established by 1957 as a renumbering of mainline NC 211 through downtown Lumberton; via Fifth Street, Second Street, Chestnut Street, and Elm Street. In 1960, it was redesignated as NC 211 Business.

=== Lumberton business loop ===
North Carolina Highway 211 Business
- Location: Lumberton, North Carolina
- Length: 3.4 mi (5.5 km)
- Existed: 1960–1971

North Carolina Highway 211 Business (NC 211 Bus) was established in 1960 as a renumbering of NC 211A, which traversed along the old NC 211 route through downtown Lumberton; via Fifth Street, Second Street, Chestnut Street, and Elm Street. On April 1, 1971, the route was decommissioned, reverting all to secondary routes; in 1983, NC 72 was reassigned onto Fifth and Second streets.

=== Bladenboro business loop ===
North Carolina Highway 211 Business
- Location: Bladenboro, North Carolina
- Length: 5.7 mi (9.2 km)
- Existed: 1975–present

North Carolina Highway 211 Business (NC 211 Bus) was established in 1975 as a renumbering of mainline NC 211 through downtown Bladenboro, via Martin Luther King Jr Drive and Seaboard Street.

== See also ==
- North Carolina Bicycle Route 3 - Concurrent with NC 211 from its southern terminus to Supply
