= North Carolina Highway 130 =

State highway in North Carolina, US

North Carolina Highway 130

Route information
- Maintained by NCDOT
- Length: 101.5 mi (163.3 km)
- Existed: 1928–present

Major junctions
- West end: US 74 Bus. / NC 71 in Maxton
- US 301 / US 501 in Rowland; I-95 near Rowland; Future I-74 / US 74 near Boardman; US 76 / US 74 Bus. / US 76 Bus. / NC 410 in Chadbourn; US 701 / US 701 Bus. in Whiteville; US 17 in Shallotte; US 17 Bus. in Shallotte
- East end: Ocean Boulevard in Holden Beach

Location
- Country: United States
- State: North Carolina
- Counties: Robeson, Columbus, Brunswick

Highway system
- North Carolina Highway System; Interstate; US; State; Scenic
| ← US 129 | → NC 131 |

North Carolina Highway 130 (NC 130) is a primary state highway in the U.S. state of North Carolina. The highway serves the towns and rural communities in southern Robeson County, connects Whiteville and Shallotte through the Green Swamp, and provides access to Holden Beach.

== Route description ==
NC 130 begins at US 74 Business and NC 71 in Maxton, and ends at Ocean Boulevard in Holden Beach.

It overlaps several highways along its route, including US 501, US 74 (future Interstate 74), US 76, NC 410 and US 17 Business.

== History ==
NC 130 was established around 1928 as a renumbering of part of NC 201 between NC 30 in Supply, to the intersection of Moore Street and Atlantic Avenue in Southport. In 1930, NC 130 was extended west along NC 30 to Shallotte, then northwest along new primary routing to NC 23 near Whiteville. In 1940, NC 130 made its final westward extension, by overlapping with US 701 to US 74 in Whiteville; in concurrency, it travels with US 74 until Boardman, then replaced NC 71 through Fairmont and Rowland before ending at US 74/NC 71 in Maxton.

By 1944, NC 130 was rerouted in Shallotte onto Whiteville Road and Powell Street to US 17 on Village Road; its old alignment of Bridger Road and Mulberry Street was downgraded to secondary roads. In 1949, NC 130 was extended north on new primary routing from Southport, through the Sunny Point Army Terminal (opened 1955) and Orton Plantation, to US 17/US 74/US 76 in Belville. In 1957, NC 130 was truncated in Shallotte; with Supply to Southport becoming part of NC 211 and Southport to Belville part of NC 40. In 1959, NC 130 was extended on new primary routing to Holden Beach. By 1962, NC 130 was adjusted onto Main Street instead of Village Road in Shallotte, downgrading Powell Street to secondary road.

In 1965, NC 130 was rerouted on new bypass southeast of Fairmont, with its old alignment through town becoming NC 130 Business. In 1972, US 74/NC 130 was placed on new alignment between the Lumber River and Chadbourn; its old alignment through Boardman and Evergreen became Old US 74 (SR 1574). In 1975, US 74/NC 130 was rerouted onto new alignment north of Chadbourn to NC 410, where then continued together south into town; five months later, the concurrencies would change to US 74 Bus. and US 76 Bus. between Chadbourn and Whiteville. NC 130 was rerouted in 2012 onto new four-lane Smith Avenue in Shallotte; NC 130 Business was established continuing along the old alignment with US 17 Bus. and onto Holden Beach Road, then on new routing on Edgewater Drive back to the mainline.

== Junction list ==
| County | Location | mi | km | Destinations | Notes |
|---|---|---|---|---|---|
| Robeson | Maxton | 0.0 | 0.0 | US 74 Bus. / NC 71 north – Red Springs, Lumberton, Laurinburg | |
| Robeson | Seven Bridges | 3.8 | 6.1 | NC 83 south – Clio | |
| Robeson | Raemon | 7.9 | 12.7 | US 501 north – Laurinburg | North end of US 501 overlap |
| Robeson | | 14.1 | 22.7 | NC 710 west – Pembroke, Red Springs | |
| Robeson | Rowland | 15.4 | 24.8 | US 301 / US 501 south – Dillon, Lumberton | South end of US 501 overlap |
| Robeson | | 16.7 | 26.9 | I-95 – Florence, Lumberton | I-95 exit 2 |
| Robeson | Five Forks | 22.9 | 36.9 | NC 904 east – Tabor City, Fair Bluff | |
| Robeson | | 25.7 | 41.4 | NC 130 Bus. east – Fairmont | |
| Robeson | Fairmont | 28.0 | 45.1 | NC 41 – Lake View, Fairmont | |
| Robeson | | 29.5 | 47.5 | NC 130 Bus. west – Fairmont | |
| Robeson | | 37.0 | 59.5 | Future I-74 / US 74 west – Maxton | West end of US 74 overlap |
| Columbus | Evergreen | 42.7 | 68.7 | NC 242 (Haynes Lennon Highway) – Bladenboro, Cerro Gordo | Future I-74 exit 228 |
| Columbus | Chadbourn | 47.5 | 76.4 | Future I-74 / US 74 east / US 74 Bus. begins / NC 410 north – Whiteville, Bladenboro | East end of US 74, west end of US 74 Bus. and north end of NC 410 overlaps; Future I-74 exit 233 |
| Columbus | Chadbourn | 49.2 | 79.2 | US 76 / US 76 Bus. begins – Fair Bluff, Whiteville | West end of US 76 Bus. overlap |
| Columbus | Chadbourn | 49.4 | 79.5 | NC 410 south (Brown Street) – Tabor City | South end of NC 410 overlap |
| Columbus | Whiteville | 56.5 | 90.9 | US 74 Bus. / US 76 Bus. east (Washington Street) / US 701 north (JK Powell Avenue) – Clarkton | East end of US 74 Bus. / US 76 Bus. and north end of US 701 overlap |
| Columbus | Whiteville | 59.1 | 95.1 | US 701 south (JK Powell Boulevard) / US 701 Bus. north (Madison Street) – Tabor City | South end of US 701 and .04-mile (0.064 km) overlap of US 701 Bus. |
| Columbus | Pleasant Plains | 64.3 | 103.5 | NC 905 south – Nakina | |
| Brunswick | Shallotte | 90.4 | 145.5 | US 17 (Ocean Highway) – Myrtle Beach, Wilmington | Partial cloverleaf interchange |
| Brunswick | Shallotte | 91.3 | 146.9 | US 17 Bus. south (Main Street) / NC 179 south (Whiteville Road) – Myrtle Beach, Ocean Isle Beach, Sunset Beach | South end of US 17 Bus. overlap |
| Brunswick | Shallotte | 92.4 | 148.7 | US 17 Bus. north / NC 130 Bus. east (Main Street) – Wilmington | North end of US 17 Bus. overlap |
| Brunswick | Shallotte | 93.1 | 149.8 | NC 130 Bus. west (Edgewater Drive) | |
| Brunswick | Intracoastal Waterway | 101.3 | 163.0 | Holden Beach Bridge | |
| Brunswick | Holden Beach | 101.5 | 163.3 | Ocean Boulevard | |
1.000 mi = 1.609 km; 1.000 km = 0.621 mi: Concurrency terminus

== Special routes ==
=== Fairmont business loop ===
North Carolina Highway 130 Business
- Location: Fairmont, North Carolina
- Length: 4.5 mi (7.2 km)
- Existed: 1965–present

North Carolina Highway 130 Business (NC 130 Bus.) is a 4.5 miles (7.2 km) business loop that goes through downtown Fairmont, via Iona Street, Main Street and Cottage Street; it also shares a short concurrency with NC 41. It was established in 1965 when mainline NC 130 was moved to a bypass route south of town.

The entire route is in Robeson County.

| Location | mi | km | Destinations | Notes |
|---|---|---|---|---|
| | 0.0 | 0.0 | NC 130 – Rowland, Whiteville | |
| Fairmont | 2.8 | 4.5 | NC 41 north (Main Street) – Lumberton | North end of NC 41 overlap |
| Fairmont | 2.9 | 4.7 | NC 41 south (Main Street) – Lake View | South end of NC 41 overlap |
| | 4.5 | 7.2 | NC 130 – Whiteville, Rowland | |
1.000 mi = 1.609 km; 1.000 km = 0.621 mi: Concurrency terminus

=== Shallotte alternate spur ===
North Carolina Highway 130A
- Location: Shallotte, North Carolina
- Length: 0.2 mi (320 m)
- Existed: 1944–1962

North Carolina Highway 130A (NC 130A) was established in 1944 as cutoff between NC 130 and US 17 (today Village Road). By 1962, US 17 was rerouted onto new primary highway in Shallotte, thus decommissioning the cutoff as NC 130 was adjusted further west.

=== Shallotte business loop ===
North Carolina Highway 130 Business
- Location: Shallotte, North Carolina
- Length: 0.6 mi (970 m)
- Existed: 2012–present

North Carolina Highway 130 Business (NC 130 Bus) is a 0.6-mile (0.97 km) business loop in Shallotte.

The entire route is in Shallotte, Brunswick County.

| mi | km | Destinations | Notes |
|---|---|---|---|
| 0.0 | 0.0 | NC 130 / US 17 Bus. south – Myrtle Beach | South end of US 17 Bus. overlap |
| 0.2 | 0.32 | US 17 Bus. north – Wilmington | North end of US 17 Bus. overlap |
| 0.6 | 0.97 | NC 130 – Holden Beach | |
1.000 mi = 1.609 km; 1.000 km = 0.621 mi: Concurrency terminus
