= U.S. Route 701 =

Highway in the United States

U.S. Route 701
- US 701 highlighted in red

Route information
- Auxiliary route of US 1
- Length: 171.45 mi (275.92 km)
- Existed: 1932–present

Major junctions
- South end: US 17 / US 17 Alt. in Georgetown, SC
- US 378 / US 501 in Conway, SC; SC 22 near Conway, SC; SC 9 near Loris, SC; Future I-74 / US 74 / US 76 in Whiteville, NC; NC 87 near Elizabethtown, NC; US 421 / NC 24 in Clinton, NC; I-40 near Newton Grove, NC; US 13 / NC 50 / NC 55 in Newton Grove, NC
- North end: US 301 / NC 96 in Four Oaks, NC

Location
- Country: United States
- States: South Carolina, North Carolina
- Counties: SC: Georgetown, Horry; NC: Columbus, Bladen, Sampson, Johnston

Highway system
- United States Numbered Highway System; List; Special; Divided
| ← SC 700 | SC | → SC 702 |
| ← NC 700 | NC | → NC 704 |

U.S. Route 701 (US 701) is an auxiliary route of US 1 in the U.S. states of South Carolina and North Carolina. The U.S. Highway runs 171.45 miles (275.92 km) from US 17 and US 17 Alternate in Georgetown, South Carolina north to US 301, North Carolina Highway 96 (NC 96), and Interstate 95 (I-95) near Four Oaks, North Carolina. US 701 serves the Pee Dee region of South Carolina and the southern and central portions of Eastern North Carolina. The highway connects Georgetown and Conway in South Carolina with the North Carolina cities of Whiteville, Elizabethtown, Clinton, and a short distance north of its terminus, Smithfield. US 701 has four business routes in North Carolina, including those through Tabor City, Whiteville, Clarkton, and Clinton.

== Route description ==
US 701 has a length of 61.55 miles (99.06 km) in South Carolina and spans 109.90 miles (176.87 km) in North Carolina. The U.S. Highway is a part of the National Highway System for one short stretches during its concurrency with NC 24 in Clinton.

=== South Carolina ===
US 701 begins at an intersection with US 17 and US 17 Alternate, which has its northern terminus, in the city of Georgetown. US 17 follows Fraser Street south and Church Street east from the intersection; US 17 Alternate follows Exchange Street west toward Highmarket Street, on which US 521 also runs and has its southern terminus at US 17 one block to the south. US 701 heads north as a four-lane road with center turn lane along Fraser Street. Shortly after leaving the city, the highway meets the southern end of SC 51 (Browns Ferry Road) and reduces to two lanes. US 701 passes the entrances to several former plantations, including Mansfield Plantation, before crossing the Black River at the hamlet of Campfield. The highway passes along the eastern edge of the Carvers Bay Preserve, which protects the namesake swamp area and Carolina Bay. US 701 passes through Plantersville and meets the eastern end of SC 261 (Pleasant Hill Drive) at Yauhannah before crossing the Georgetown–Horry county line at the Pee Dee River.

US 701 passes by the villages of Bucksport, Bucksville—the site of Hebron Church and Buck's Upper Mill Farm— and Toddville as the highway roughly parallels the Waccamaw River north to Conway. On entering the city limits, the U.S. Highway follows 4th Avenue and expands to a four-lane road with center turn lane. US 701 meets US 501 (Church Street), US 378 (Wright Boulevard), and SC 905 (4th Avenue) at a triangular junction southwest of downtown. US 701 has ramps to and from southbound US 501 just before passing under the highway; southbound US 701 uses the exit ramp from US 501 while northbound US 701 continues to its intersection with US 378. SC 905 begins and heads into the Conway Downtown Historic District while US 701 makes a sharp turn west to join US 378 for a short concurrency to the latter highway's junction with US 501, where northbound US 701 joins the southbound direction and US 501 on Church Street.

US 701 and US 501 head north on Church Street, a four-lane road with center turn lane, to 16th Avenue, a four-lane street onto which US 701 turns east and runs concurrently with US 501 Business. The concurrency ends at Main Street, where the business route turns south onto Main Street toward downtown and US 701 turns north onto the street, which expands from two to four lanes north of the intersection, to head out of the city. The U.S. Highway parallels the Waccamaw Coast Line Railroad north through the village of Homewood, where the highway meets the eastern end of SC 319 and reduces to two lanes, then gradually splits away from the railroad on its way to a partial cloverleaf interchange with SC 22 (Veterans Highway). At its intersection with SC 410 (Green Sea Road), US 701 veers northeast, has an oblique grade crossing of the railroad, and parallels the rail line to the city of Loris. The U.S. Highway passes through Loris as Broad Street, which intersects SC 9 Business (Main Street). US 701 leaves Loris and parallels the railroad north through a partial cloverleaf interchange with SC 9 to just south of the South Carolina–North Carolina state line.

=== North Carolina ===
Just south of the northwest–southeast state line, US 701 veers northeast to bypass Tabor City while US 701 Business follows Hickman Road parallel to the railroad toward the center of the town in Columbus County immediately to the north of the state line. The bypass intersects NC 904 (Pireway Road) before meeting the north end of the business route and NC 410 (5th Avenue) on the eastern edge of town. US 701 has a short concurrency with NC 410 before that highway splits north as Joe Brown Highway. The U.S. Highway heads northeast as James B. White Highway through the hamlet of Sydney before reaching the south end of the city of Whiteville. There, US 701 Business splits to the east as Madison Street while the mainline continues as J.K. Powell Boulevard. Just north of the business route split, US 701 meets NC 130 (Love Mill Road) and runs concurrently with the highway along a two-lane road with center turn lane. The highways cross Soules Swamp and intersects the Carolina Southern Railroad at grade, then pass through Whiteville's main street grid. West of the city center, US 701 and NC 130 intersect US 74 Business and US 76 Business (Washington Street), which NC 130 joins heading west toward Chadbourn. North of downtown, US 701 has a dumbbell interchange with US 74 and US 76 (Andrew Jackson Highway), a freeway that will carry I-74 in the future.

North of Whiteville, two-lane US 701 collects the northern end of US 701 Business and continues the business route's name of James B. White Highway. The highway veers northeast as its junction with NC 131 (Bladenboro Road) at Western Prong. US 701 Business splits to the northeast just before both highways enter Bladen County. US 701 follows W.R. Latham Street through the town of Clarkton, where the highway intersects NC 211 (Green Street) and CSX's Wilmington Subdivision. North of town, US 701 collects the northern end of its business route, College Street, crosses Brown Marsh Swamp, and passes to the west of the historic Brown Marsh Presbyterian Church. The highway continues north to Elizabethtown, on the southern edge of which US 701 intersects and becomes concurrent with NC 242 and has a junction with NC 87, which bypasses the town to the south. The U.S. Highway passes through town as Poplar Street, which intersects NC 87 Business in the center of town; there, NC 41 joins US 701 and NC 242 as they exit the town on a four-lane divided highway that crosses the Cape Fear River. North–south NC 242 splits from US 701 and NC 41 at the same three-way intersection east–west NC 53 joins the highways to pass through Bladen Lakes State Forest, which is named for several Carolina Bays known collectively as the Bladen Lake Group. US 701, NC 41, and NC 53 head east as a two-lane road to the town of White Lake, which surrounds the namesake lake. The two state highways separate from the U.S. Highway at separate intersections in the town.

US 701 heads north and intersects NC 210 before crossing the South River into Sampson County. The highway's name becomes Garland Highway with local variation through the town of Garland, where it follows Ingold Street and intersects NC 411 (2nd Street). US 701 crosses Great Coharie Creek, passes along the edge of the unincorporated community of Ingold, and through the hamlet of Butlers Crossroads. On the southern edge of Clinton, US 701 meets US 421 at a partial cloverleaf interchange; US 701 Business heads straight on Southeast Boulevard while the U.S. Highways head northwest together on the four-lane Faircloth Freeway. The freeway has a three-ramp diamond interchange with Tram Road—the missing ramp is from Tram Road to northbound US 701—just east of a partial interchange with NC 24 where the state highway joins the freeway. Access from northbound US 701 and US 421 to eastbound NC 24 and from westbound NC 24 to southbound US 701 and US 421 is provided via Tram Road. NC 24 splits from the U.S. Highways at the diamond interchange with Sunset Avenue, which the state highway follows west out of the city. US 421 splits from US 701 from a partial interchange where US 421 exits onto Northwest Boulevard to head toward Dunn. Access from southbound US 701 to northbound US 421 and from southbound US 421 to northbound US 701 via North Boulevard, which US 701 meets at the next diamond interchange. The freeway ends where US 701 meets the northern end of US 701 Business and takes over two-lane Hobbton Highway.

US 701 continues through the villages of Keener and Hobbton and meets I-40 at a partial cloverleaf interchange between Monks Crossroads and the town of Newton Grove. In the center of town, the U.S. Highway meets US 13, NC 50, and NC 55 at a six-legged roundabout known as Weeks Circle. US 701 follows Clinton Street south of the circle and Main Street to the north. US 13 uses Fayetteville Street on the southwest leg of the roundabout and Goldsboro Highway to the northeast. NC 50 and NC 55 together use Raleigh Street on the northwest branch of the circle and Mount Olive Drive on the southeast leg. Just after leaving the town limits, US 701 enters Johnston County. The highway passes to the west of the Bentonville Battlefield and through the hamlets of Overshot and Strickland Crossroads before reaching its northern terminus on the eastern edge of Four Oaks. US 701 has a four-way intersection with NC 96, which receives the northbound I-95 exit ramp, and Devils Racetrack Road, which leads to the northbound entrance ramp. US 701 and NC 96 cross over I-95 together at Exit 90 and US 701 has its terminus at their intersection with US 301. NC 96 continues north with US 301 toward Smithfield and US 301 heads southwest on its own toward the center of Four Oaks, providing access to the southbound I-95 interchange ramps just west of US 701.

== History ==
Established in 1932, US 701 began in Charleston, at the intersection with US 17 (King Street) then proceeded east over the John P. Grace Memorial Bridge into Mount Pleasant. Continuing north, it went through Georgetown, Conway before entering North Carolina. Its routing in South Carolina was in complete concurrency with SC 40, which was removed in 1933. In North Carolina, also in a complete concurrency with NC 23, it traversed through Tabor City, Whiteville, Elizabethtown, Clinton, Newton Grove and ending south of Smithfield.

In 1935, US 17 was rerouted to overlap with US 701 between Charleston and Georgetown. Between Clinton and Newton Grove, US 701 was straightened, leaving behind various secondary roads in the area. By 1948, US 701 was placed on a new routing along Southeast and Northeast Boulevards, leaving behind US 701A. In 1950, US 701 was rerouted from Conway to Tabor City, leaving behind today's SC 410. In 1956, US 701 was placed on new bypass west of Whiteville, its old route eventually became US 701 Bus. In 1957, US 701 was placed on a new bypass east of Tabor City, leaving behind what became US 701 Bus; also same year a new bypass was constructed west of Clarkton, its old route also becoming US 701 Bus.

Around 1965, US 701 was placed on new bypass south of Ingold, its old alignment becoming secondary road. In 1967, US 17/US 701 was bypassed north of Mount Pleasant, leaving behind US 17 Bus/US 701 Bus. In March 1973, US 701 was placed on US 421's western bypass of Clinton, leaving behind US 701 Bus. In 1992, US 701's southern terminus was truncated in Georgetown, leaving behind a solo US 17 to Charleston.

=== North Carolina Highway 23 ===
North Carolina Highway 23
- Location: SC state line-Louisburg, NC
- Existed: 1921–1934

NC 23 was an original state highway. In 1922 it was routed from the South Carolina Border to NC 22 in Dublin. In 1924 NC 70 was given the part of NC 23 from Lumberton to the South Carolina Border. In 1925 NC 23 was extended north along NC 21 to Elizabethtown. It then was placed on new routing from Elizabethtown to NC 60 south of Clinton. In 1928 NC 23 was removed from its routing from Elizabethtown to Lumberton. Instead NC 23 replaced NC 21 to Whiteville then was placed on new routing to Tabor City where it met up with South Carolina Highway 40. In 1930 NC 23 was extended through Clinton along NC 60 then went north on new road to Newton Grove. NC 23 then replaced NC 220 through both Smithfield and Selma before the road ended at NC 91 near Zebulon. In 1932 US 701 was assigned the routing from the South Carolina State Line to US 301 near Smithfield. In 1933 NC 23 was extended through Zebulon to Louisburg. In 1934 NC 23 was dropped from the routing that US 701 was also along. The rest was renumbered NC 39.

=== South Carolina Highway 40 ===
South Carolina Highway 40
- Location: Charleston, SC-NC state line
- Existed: 1922–1933

South Carolina Highway 40 (SC 40) was an original South Carolina highway that began in Mount Pleasant and traversed north through McClellanville, Georgetown, Conway, and Green Sea before heading into North Carolina at Tabor City. By 1926, a ferry was put in service connecting Mount Pleasant to Charleston, near the Custom House. In 1929, SC 40 was placed on the John P. Grace Memorial Bridge into Charleston, ending at SC 2 (King Street). In 1932, US 701 was assigned to the entirety of SC 40; which was decommissioned a year later.

== Major intersections ==
| State | County | Location | mi | km | Destinations | Notes |
|---|---|---|---|---|---|---|
| South Carolina | Georgetown | Georgetown | 0.00 | 0.00 | US 17 Alt. west (Exchange Street) / US 17 | Southern terminus; highway continues as US 17 south (Fraser Street) |
| South Carolina | Georgetown | Georgetown | 2.90 | 4.67 | SC 51 north – Hopewell | |
| South Carolina | Georgetown | | 19.22 | 30.93 | SC 261 west (Pleasant Hill Drive) – Hopewell | |
| South Carolina | Great Pee Dee River | | 22.06 | 35.50 | Yauhannah Bridge | |
| South Carolina | Horry | Conway | 35.91 | 57.79 | US 501 south (Truck route to SC 90) – All Beaches | Signalized interchange; southbound exit and northbound entrance |
| South Carolina | Horry | Conway | 36.04 | 58.00 | US 378 begins / SC 905 east / Smith Street – Longs | South end of concurrency with westbound US 378 |
| South Carolina | Horry | Conway | 36.2 | 58.3 | US 501 south (Truck Route to SC 90) – All Beaches | Interchange; south end of concurrency with US 501; southbound left exit only |
| South Carolina | Horry | Conway | 36.21 | 58.27 | US 501 south (Church Street south) / US 378 to SC 905 – Lake City | North end of concurrency with westbound US 378 |
| South Carolina | Horry | Conway | 37.11 | 59.72 | US 501 Bus. ends / US 501 north (Church Street north) – Marion | North end of concurrency with US 501; south end of concurrency with US 501 Bus. |
| South Carolina | Horry | Conway | 37.63 | 60.56 | US 501 Bus. east (Main Street south) | North end of concurrency with US 501 Bus. |
| South Carolina | Horry | Homewood | 40.42 | 65.05 | SC 319 west – Aynor | |
| South Carolina | Horry | | 44.56 | 71.71 | SC 22 – Myrtle Beach, North Myrtle Beach, Marion | Partial cloverleaf interchange |
| South Carolina | Horry | Baxter Forks | 46.57 | 74.95 | SC 410 north (Green Sea Road) – Green Sea | |
| South Carolina | Horry | Loris | 55.92 | 89.99 | SC 9 Bus. (Main Street) – Green Sea | |
| South Carolina | Horry | Loris | 57.98 | 93.31 | SC 9 – North Myrtle Beach, Dillon | Partial cloverleaf interchange |
| South Carolina | Horry | | 61.48 | 98.94 | US 701 Bus. north | Northbound outbound access and southbound inbound access only |
| | | | 61.55 0.00 | 99.06 0.00 | South Carolina–North Carolina line | |
| North Carolina | Columbus | Tabor City | 0.60 | 0.97 | NC 904 (Pireway Road) | |
| North Carolina | Columbus | Tabor City | 1.89 | 3.04 | US 701 Bus. / NC 410 south (Fifth Street) | South end of concurrency with NC 410 |
| North Carolina | Columbus | Tabor City | 2.57 | 4.14 | NC 410 north (Joe Brown Highway) – Chadbourn | North end of concurrency with NC 410 |
| North Carolina | Columbus | Whiteville | 16.10 | 25.91 | US 701 Bus. north (Madison Street) | |
| North Carolina | Columbus | Whiteville | 16.21 | 26.09 | NC 130 east (Love Mill Road) – Brunswick | South end of concurrency with NC 130 |
| North Carolina | Columbus | Whiteville | 18.80 | 30.26 | US 74 Bus. / US 76 Bus. / NC 130 west (Washington Street) – Chadbourn | North end of concurrency with NC 130 |
| North Carolina | Columbus | Whiteville | 19.55 | 31.46 | US 74 / US 76 (Future I-74) – Chadbourn, Lumberton, Wilmington | Partial cloverleaf interchange; I-74 exit 241 |
| North Carolina | Columbus | | 20.66 | 33.25 | US 701 Bus. south (James B. White Highway) – Whiteville | |
| North Carolina | Columbus | | 24.52 | 39.46 | NC 131 north (Bladenboro Road) – Bladenboro | |
| North Carolina | Columbus | | 30.19 | 48.59 | US 701 Bus. north (College Street) – Clarkton | |
| North Carolina | Bladen | Clarkton | 31.79 | 51.16 | NC 211 (Green Street) – Bladenboro, Bolton | |
| North Carolina | Bladen | | 32.77 | 52.74 | US 701 Bus. south (College Street) – Clarkton | |
| North Carolina | Bladen | Elizabethtown | 39.95 | 64.29 | NC 242 south – Bladenboro | South end of concurrency with NC 242 |
| North Carolina | Bladen | Elizabethtown | 40.14 | 64.60 | NC 87 – Wilmington, Fayetteville | |
| North Carolina | Bladen | Elizabethtown | 42.04 | 67.66 | NC 87 Bus. / NC 41 west (Broad Street) – Lumberton | South end of concurrency with NC 41 |
| North Carolina | Bladen | | 43.36 | 69.78 | NC 53 west / NC 242 north – Fayetteville, Roseboro | North end of concurrency with NC 242; south end of concurrency with NC 53 |
| North Carolina | Bladen | White Lake | 47.42 | 76.32 | NC 53 east – Burgaw | North end of concurrency with NC 53 |
| North Carolina | Bladen | White Lake | 49.32 | 79.37 | NC 41 east – Wallace | North end of concurrency with NC 41 |
| North Carolina | Bladen | Hickory Grove Crossroads | 57.26 | 92.15 | NC 210 – Fayetteville, Currie | |
| North Carolina | South River | | 58.44 | 94.05 | South River Bridge | |
| North Carolina | Sampson | Garland | 60.39 | 97.19 | NC 411 (2nd Street) – Harrells, Roseboro | |
| North Carolina | Sampson | | 74.22 | 119.45 | US 421 south (Faircloth Freeway) / US 701 Bus. north (Southeast Boulevard) – Wilmington, Clinton | Partial cloverleaf interchange; south end of freeway section; south end of concurrency with US 421 |
| North Carolina | Sampson | Clinton | 75.65 | 121.75 | To NC 24 east – Warsaw Tram Road – Clinton High School | Northbound signage; no northbound entrance Southbound signage |
| North Carolina | Sampson | Clinton | 76.19 | 122.62 | NC 24 east (Southwest Boulevard) – Warsaw | Southbound exit and northbound entrance; south end of concurrency with NC 24 |
| North Carolina | Sampson | Clinton | 77.00 | 123.92 | NC 24 west – Roseboro, Fayetteville | Diamond interchange; north end of concurrency with NC 24 |
| North Carolina | Sampson | Clinton | 77.73 | 125.09 | US 421 north – Dunn | Northbound left exit and southbound entrance; north end of concurrency with US 421 |
| North Carolina | Sampson | Clinton | 78.56 | 126.43 | North Boulevard | North end of freeway |
| North Carolina | Sampson | | 80.34 | 129.29 | US 701 Bus. south – Clinton | |
| North Carolina | Sampson | Newton Grove | 93.42 | 150.34 | I-40 – Raleigh, Wilmington | I-40 exit 343 |
| North Carolina | Sampson | Newton Grove | 94.81 | 152.58 | US 13 / NC 50 / NC 55 – Mount Olive, Faison, Goldsboro, Raleigh, Dunn, Fayetteville | Weeks Circle; six-legged roundabout |
| North Carolina | Johnston | Four Oaks | 109.57– 109.90 | 176.34– 176.87 | NC 96 south / Devils Racetrack Road to I-95 north – Wilson | South end of concurrency with NC 96; I-95 exit 90 |
| North Carolina | Johnston | Four Oaks | 109.57– 109.90 | 176.34– 176.87 | NC 96 north / US 301 to I-95 south – Four Oaks, Benson | Northern terminus; I-95 exit 90; north end of concurrency with NC 96; highway continues as US 301/NC 96 north |
1.000 mi = 1.609 km; 1.000 km = 0.621 mi: Concurrency terminus; Incomplete access

== Special routes ==
Six special routes currently exist for US 701. There are business loops of US 701 serving the North Carolina municipalities of Tabor City, Whiteville, Clarkton, and Clinton. In South Carolina, a short truck route exists north of the city of Conway. There is also another truck route in the southeastern part of Conway and points east of the city. An alternate route once existed in Clinton, North Carolina and a business loop once served Mount Pleasant, South Carolina.

== See also ==
- North Carolina Bicycle Route 5 - Concurrent with US 701 between Sweet Home Church Road and NC 53 near White Lake
