= Toddville, South Carolina =

Toddville
- Unincorporated Community
- Interactive map of Toddville
- Coordinates: 33°45′32″N 79°04′34″W
- Country: United States
- State: South Carolina
- County: Horry County
- ZIP Code: 29527
- Area code: 843
- GNIS feature ID: 1231865

Toddville is a small unincorporated community in Horry County, South Carolina, United States. Toddville is south of Conway on U.S. Route 701 and mostly consists of farmland.
