= Beast of Bladenboro =

Cryptid found in North Carolina

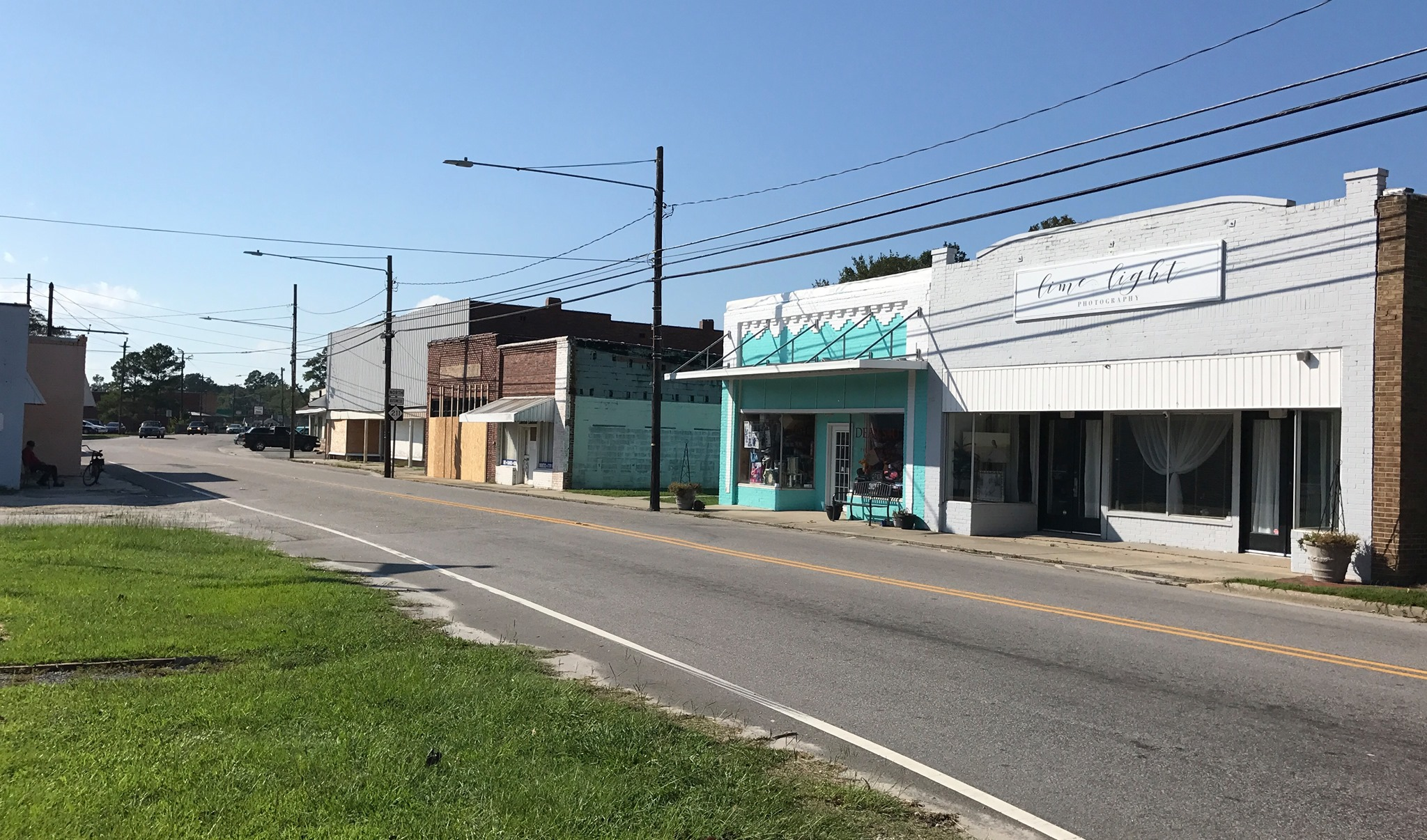
Bladenboro, North Carolina in 2019.

The Beast of Bladenboro refers to a creature responsible for a string of deaths amongst Bladenboro, North Carolina animals in the winter of 1953–54. According to witnesses and trackers, it was likely a wildcat species, but its identity was ultimately not definitively confirmed. According to reports, the animal commonly crushed or decapitated its victims, which were mostly dogs.

== Deaths ==
The first animal deaths possibly related to the Beast of Bladenboro were reported on December 29, 1953. Witnesses described a creature that was "sleek, black, about 5 feet (1.5 m) long", which killed a dog in Clarkton, North Carolina, approximately eight miles (13 km) from Bladenboro.

On December 31, 1953, two dogs belonging to a resident of Bladenboro were found dead with a significant amount of blood near their kennels. Their owner reported that the dogs were "torn into ribbons and crushed".

My dogs put up a good fight. There was blood all over the porch, big puddles of it. And there was a pool of saliva on the porch. It killed one dog at 10:30 and left it lying there. My dad wrapped the dog up in a blanket. That thing came back and got that dog and nobody's seen the dog since. At 1:30 in the morning, it came back and killed the other dog and took it off. We found it three days later in a hedgerow. The top of one of the dogs heads was torn off and its body was crushed and wet, like it had been in that thing's mouth. The other dog's lower jaw was torn off.

— Johnny Vause

The following day, on January 1, 1954, two more dogs were found dead at a Bladenboro farm, and on the night of January 2, 1954, a farmer reported that a dog of his had been killed.

Two more dogs were found dead on January 3, 1954. An autopsy was performed on one of the dogs and it was reported that "there wasn't more than two or three drops of blood in him [...] The victim's bottom lip had been broken open and his jawbone smashed back."

Further deaths were reported in the subsequent days: on the night of January 5, 1954, a pet rabbit was found "cleanly decapitated and still warm", and on January 7, a dead dog was found in a pasture near the Bladenboro swamp. A goat was also reported to have died with its head flattened.

== Encounters and descriptions ==
One local described the animal as "about four and a half feet [1.4 m] long, bushy, and resembling either a bear or a panther", while another person described it as "small" and noted that there was "a little one just like it [...] running beside it." Another local described hearing "a strange noise [...] like a baby crying". Though he did not see the animal, he estimated it was "close to 150 pounds [70 kg], the way it went through the bushes."

Another account detailed in a local newspaper contained the following physical description:

It was about 20 inches [50 cm] high. It had a long tail, about 14 inches [35 cm]. The color of it was dark. It had a face exactly like a cat. Only I ain't ever seen a cat that big. It was walking around stealthy, sneaky...

A group of hunters from Wilmington spent that night tracking the creature for three miles (4.8 km) around swampland. According to them, the tracks showed claws at least an inch (2.5 cm) long and indicated an 80-to-90-pound (35 to 40 kg) animal. The beast's circling movement suggested it might have had offspring or a mate nearby, the hunters said.

On January 5, the beast was witnessed attacking a dog which ran away and was not found. Tracks were seen along a creek bank near one of the attack sites; there were two sets of prints and one was smaller. Later that day, in the early evening, another resident described "a big mountain lion" near some dogs three houses down. The creature ran toward her, but turned and fled when she screamed. Outside her home, the tracks left in the dirt road were "bigger than a silver dollar" according to Police Chief Fores.

A young boy named Dalton Norton reported seeing what he called "a big cat" on January 6, which "made a noise like a baby crying" on his porch before leaving.

On January 11, two cars stopped for an animal reported to be four feet (1.2 m) long. One of the men in the cars was quoted as saying the animal had "runty-looking ears" and was "brownish and tabby."

== Hunt for the Beast ==
Luther Davis and Mayor Woodrow Fussell next to the bobcat Davis trapped

On the night of January 3, Police Chief Roy Fores searched for the creature with his dogs, but they reportedly would not follow the trail.

"A half-dozen brave youths" and their dogs then spent January 4 searching for the creature, while that night, Fores and eight to ten other officers conducted their own hunt. Hunters who traveled to Bladenboro from Wilmington also searched for the beast that evening, reportedly tracking it for 3 miles (4.8 km) around the swamp.

On the night of January 5, more than 500 people and dogs hunted through the woods and swamps for the creature.

On January 6, more than 800 people turned out to hunt for the beast in the swamps. Fores planned to tie up dogs as bait to lure the creature out, but this plan was not put into action. The hunt itself was also ended by officials due to safety concerns.

On January 7, another 800 to 1,000 people gathered to hunt the creature.

During the evening of the 8th, four fraternity brothers from the University of North Carolina at Chapel Hill were the only reported hunters. Mayor Fussell officially called off the hunt unless the creature made another obvious kill or there was a legitimate sighting. The armed hunting parties of previous nights had become too large for safety, and Fores received a telegram from a humane society in Asheville, North Carolina protesting his plan to stake out dogs as bait for the creature.

On January 13, Luther Davis, a local farmer, found a bobcat struggling with a steel trap in Big Swamp, four miles (6.4 km) from the city, and shot it in the head. Woodrow Fussell, the mayor of Bladenboro, told newspapers that the beast of Bladenboro had been found and killed. However, it has been questioned whether such a small cat could have killed and mangled the dogs. On the same day, Bruce Soles from Tabor City was leaving Bladenboro when he hit a cat with his vehicle. According to reports, it was "spotted like a leopard," about 20 to 24 inches (50 to 60 cm) high, and weighed between 75 and 90 pounds (35 and 40 kg). He took the cat home with him to Tabor City. Yet a third man, "professional hunter and guide" Berry Lewis, is credited in some newspapers as having killed the animal. There were conflicting reports about whether it was Davis's or Lewis's cat that Mayor Fussell photographed and sent out to the press. Lewis was reportedly hunting in a different part of Bladen county when he shot and killed his bobcat.

== Speculation ==
Many reported accounts describe the Beast of Bladenboro as feline, but do not agree on any one species.

The animal has been described as "resembling either a bear or a panther." Wilmington hunter S.W. Garrett also claimed to have heard the creature scream while hunting and likened it to that of a panther. Harry Davis, curator at the Raleigh State Museum, has said that a panther "never occurs in this country", and was of the opinion that it might have actually been a coyote.

One local resident claimed the beast had tracks like those of a dog, but also said "I've never seen a dog that large." Chief Fores was also reported as believing the beast to be a wolf. He said that "old folks say they remember seeing wolves in the bay-swamp area and talk about them every now and then."

C. E. Kinlaw described the creature as looking like "a big mountain lion" when it charged her on January 5. ("Mountain lion" is the term typically used west of the Mississippi for "cougar"). The game warden of Elizabeth City, North Carolina, Sam Culberth, said that the tracks he investigated indicated a "catamount" (this is yet another name for a cougar).

Other people described the animal as likely being a wolverine, while others speculated that the creature may have been a "wild police dog."

A. R. Stanton, a man from Lumberton, North Carolina, thought that the beast of Bladenboro was a German Shepherd and Hound mix named Big Boy that he gave to a Native American boy who lived along the edge of Big Swamp. Big Boy was dark and had a "long, bushy tail". Stanton claimed Big Boy was capable of leaping over a six-foot (1.8 m) fence and killed chickens from time to time. Lumberton veterinarian N. G. Baird said that it was "very feasible" that Big Boy was responsible for the attacks. Baird also said that it was possible Big Boy (or another dog) could have killed the other dogs and lapped up blood, rather than sucking it.

== Legacy ==
Literature about the events of the winter of 1953–54 tends towards skepticism, particularly because of the publicity involved for the town through the sensational news reports.

Mayor Woodrow Fussell, who operated the town theater, went to Charlotte, North Carolina on January 6 to book the film The Big Cat for a day. Fussell told an interviewer that he believed the creature to be a hoax, even though he was the one who called the Wilmington newspapers about the dead dogs. He found the manner of their deaths strange, and said that "a little publicity never hurts a town".

A "one-arm sign painter" tailored his art to fit the sensationalism surrounding the incidents in 1954, making bumper plates proclaiming "Home of the Beast of Bladenboro".

On the morning of December 15, 1954, on a tenant farm near Robeson Memorial Hospital, "five mediumsized pigs and three chickens" were found dead, with "crushed skulls [...] Three of the pigs had legs torn apart from their bodies. Strangely enough, no blood was evident, indicating the killer employed the same blood-sucking traits as the Bladenboro beast." The next day, a stray dog was killed, which the County Dog Warden said was "most probably" the killer from the day before, even though the tracks found at the farm were not compared to the dead dog's, and it was not explained how the dog could have reached the chickens, which were reportedly roosting in a tree.

Boost The 'Boro, a community booster for Bladenboro, holds an annual "Beast Fest" in which the Beast of Bladenboro (or "BOB") serves as mascot. Boost The 'Boro makes use of the beast's sensational history amongst locals to generate excitement for the community event.

== See also ==
- Glawackus
- Beast of Gévaudan
- Wampus cat

== Citations ==
- "'Beast Of Bladenboro' Scare Ends In Death Of Large Dog". The Robesonian. 16 December 1954. pp. 1, 7.
- "'Beast Of Bladenboro' Type Killer Strikes In Robeson". The Robesonian. 15 December 1954.
- Beast Takes Stroll; Frightens Autoists. (1954, January 12). Wilmington Morning Star, p. 1.
- Bladen Man Traps Bobcat; Is It The Ferocious Beast? (1954, January 14). The Wilmington Morning Star, p. 1.
- Corey, J. (1958, June). Is The Beast Dead? The Carolina Farmer.
- Enterprise! (1954, January 8). Wilmington Morning Star.
- Fresh Dogs Seek 'Beast' At Bladenboro. (1954, January 8). The Wilmington News. p. 1.
- Gallehugh, J. F. (1976). The Vampire Beast of Bladenboro. North Carolina Folklore Journal, 24, 53–58.
- Grady, S., Scheer, J., & Green, R. (1954 January 7). The Beast Of Bladenboro - They All Know 'It'll Come Back'. The Charlotte News.
- Hall, J. (1954, January 5). Vampire Tendencies Found In Bladenboro’s “Monsters.” Wilmington Morning Star, p. 1,3.
- Hall, J. (1954 January 6). Bladen Beast Still Prowls. Wilmington Morning Star.
- Hall, J. (1954 January 7). Guns, Dogs Circle Blood Lusty Beast. Wilmington Morning Star, p. 1.
- Hall, J. (1954, January 8). Monster Strikes Again, Slays Dog. Wilmington Morning Star, p. 1.
- Hall, J. (1954, January 9). Vampire Beast Wins Battle Of Bladenboro. Wilmington Morning Star. p. 1.
- Hester, H. (2007). The Beast of Bladenboro : a compilation of articles and writings. Bladenboro, NC: Boost the ’Boro.
- Hotz, A. (2006, October 29). The Beast of Bladenboro. Star News.
- Hunt Animal Blamed With Killing Eight Dogs At Bladenboro In Week. (1954, January 7). The Bladen Journal, p. 1.
- Hunters, Dogs Tracking Bladen Mystery Killer. (1954, January 7). The Wilmington News, p. 1.
- Mysterious Beast Still at Large. (1954, January 4). The Wilmington News, p. 1.
- Mystery Beast Slays Dogs of Bladenboro. (1954, January 4). Wilmington Morning Star, p. 1.
- Thinks Bladen Killer Dog He Gave Indian. (1954, January 13). Wilmington Morning Star, p. 1.
- 'Vampire' Charges Woman. (1954, January 6). The News and Observer, p. 1,6.
- 'Vampire' Theory Fails To Draw Comment From Officer. (1954, January 13). The Robesonian, pp. 1, 4.
