= Ralph E. Suggs =

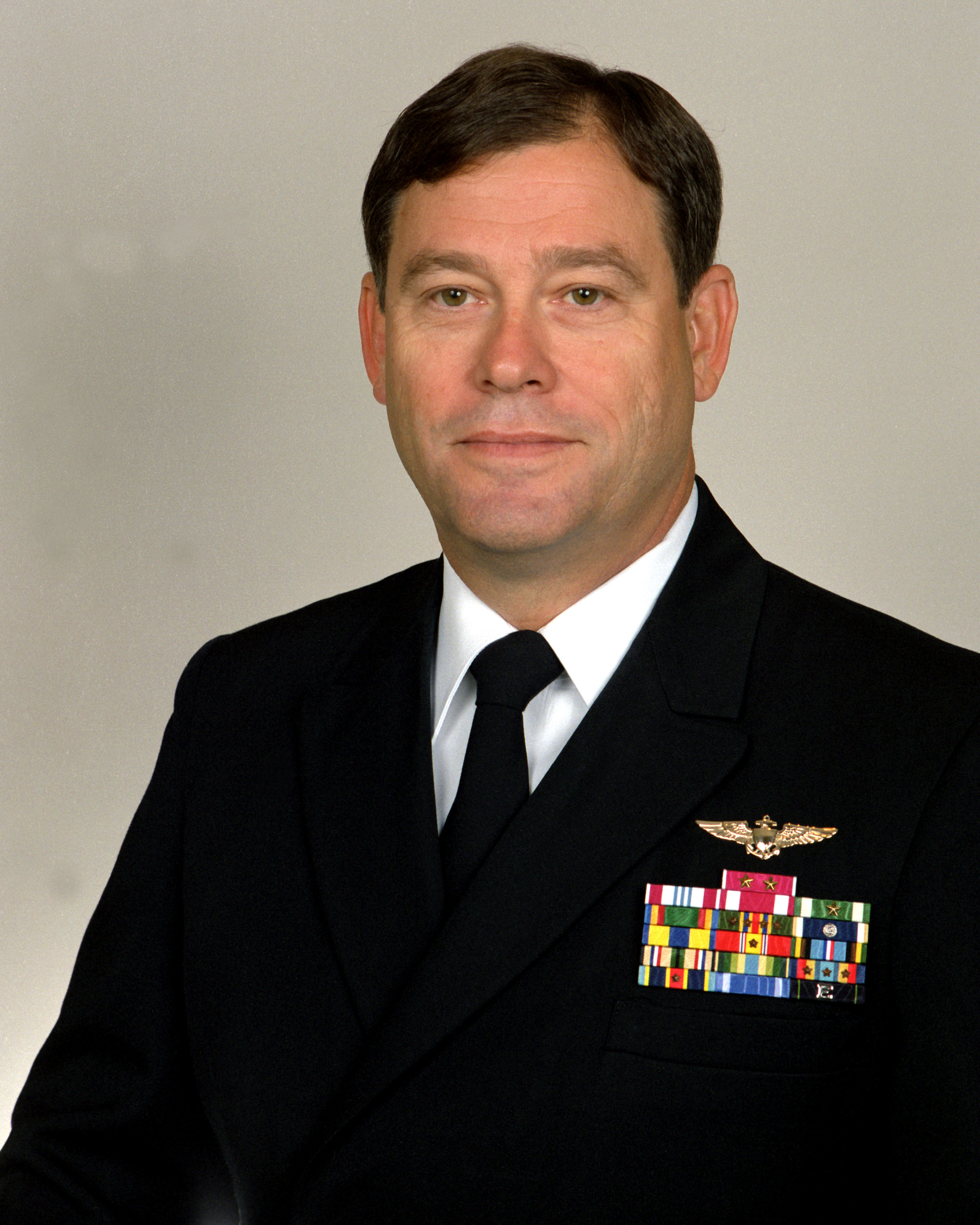
Ralph Suggs in August 1996

Ralph Edward Suggs (born May 12, 1947) is a retired Rear Admiral in the United States Navy.

== Biography ==
A native of Whiteville, North Carolina, Suggs is a 1969 graduate of North Carolina State University. He was the Director of Field Service Operations of Harley-Davidson and resided in Cedarburg, Wisconsin.

== Career ==
Suggs was commissioned an officer in the Navy in 1970. He earned his aviation wings the following year. Assignments he was given include serving aboard the USS Saratoga (CV-60), the USS Independence (CV-62), the USS Nimitz (CVN-68), and the USS Carl Vinson (CVN-70). In 1991 he assumed command of the USS San Diego (AFS-6). Subsequently, he was given command of the USS America (CV-66), during which time he took part in the 1995 NATO bombing campaign in Bosnia and Herzegovina and Operation Uphold Democracy. Later he also participated in Operation Southern Watch. He retired in 2000.

Following his military career, he was general manager of the Harley Owners Group and Rider Services, which has 1.2 million members worldwide.

In June 2010, he returned to his alma mater to become the executive director of the North Carolina State Alumni Association

Awards he received include the Defense Distinguished Service Medal, the Legion of Merit with four oak leaf clusters, the Defense Meritorious Service Medal, the Meritorious Service Medal, and the Navy Commendation Medal with oak leaf cluster.
