= Delco, North Carolina =

- Census-designated place
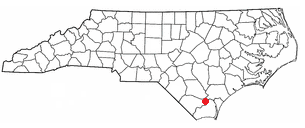
- Location with the U.S. state of North Carolina

- Location within the U.S. state of North Carolina
- Coordinates: 34°19′08″N 78°13′36″W
- Country: United States
- State: North Carolina
- County: Columbus

Area
  - Total: 1.51 sq mi (3.91 km^{2})
  - Land: 1.51 sq mi (3.91 km^{2})
  - Water: 0 sq mi (0.00 km^{2})
- Elevation: 36 ft (11 m)

Population (2020)
  - Total: 287
  - Density: 190.3/sq mi (73.48/km^{2})
- Time zone: UTC-5 (Eastern)
  - Summer (DST): UTC-4 (EDT)
- ZIP code: 28436
- FIPS code: 37-16780
- GNIS feature ID: 2628621

Delco (formerly Brinkly, New Berlin, and Pershing) is an unincorporated community and census-designated place (CDP) in Columbus County, North Carolina, United States. The population was 287 at the 2020 census.

== Geography ==
Delco is located near the eastern tip of Columbus County, at an elevation of 49 feet (15 m). U.S. Routes 74 and 76 (Andrew Jackson Highway) pass through the center of the community, leading east 18 miles (29 km) to Wilmington and west 28 miles (45 km) to Whiteville, the Columbus County seat. North Carolina Highway 87 leads northwest from Delco 32 miles (51 km) to Elizabethtown.

According to the United States Census Bureau, the Delco CDP has a total area of 1.5 square miles (3.9 km^{2}), all land.

Acme-Delco Middle School was located in Delco prior to its closing in 2020.

== Filming location ==
Wilmington, featuring Cinespace Wilmington, is a hub for film and television production. Due to its proximity to Wilmington, Delco has served as the location for filming movies and TV shows. Most notably, the 2021 horror film The Black Phone was filmed at the closed Acme Delco Middle School.

== Demographics ==
Historical population
Census	Pop.	Note	%±
2020	287		—
U.S. Decennial Census
