= North Carolina Highway 411 =

State highway in Sampson County, North Carolina, US

North Carolina Highway 411

Route information
- Maintained by NCDOT
- Length: 27.9 mi (44.9 km)
- Existed: 1937–present

Major junctions
- West end: NC 242 near Roseboro
- US 701 in Garland
- East end: US 421 / NC 41 in Harrells

Location
- Country: United States
- State: North Carolina
- Counties: Sampson

Highway system
- North Carolina Highway System; Interstate; US; State; Scenic
← NC 410	→ NC 417

North Carolina Highway 411 (NC 411) is a 27.9-mile-long (44.9 km) primary state highway in the U.S. state of North Carolina. The 28-mile-long (45 km) route connects the towns of Harrells, Garland, and Roseboro, entirely in Sampson County.

== Route description ==
NC 411's western terminus is at NC 242 south near Roseboro, NC 411 travels southwest and meets a junction with US 701 before it reaches Garland, after NC 411 leaves Garland, it meets a junction with the southern terminus of NC 903 and goes with the street name Harrells Highway traveling rural Sampson County, when NC 411 hits NC 41, they travel east together until they hit US 421 in Harrells.

== History ==
NC 411 was first commissioned in 1937, starting as a short route between Harrells and Garland. Its eastern terminus was at the former alignment of NC 41 and the western terminus was at US 701. In the early 1950s the routing of NC 411 was extended and altered slightly to its current alignment.

== Junction list ==
The entire route is in Sampson County.

Location	mi	km	Destinations	Notes
Roseboro	0.0	0.0	NC 242 – Salemburg, Ammon	
Garland	13.3	21.4	US 701 (Ingold Avenue) – Clinton, Elizabethtown	
	17.7	28.5	NC 903 north	Southern terminus of NC 903
Harrells	26.7	43.0	NC 41 west (Tomahawk Highway) / Bland School Road – Elizabethtown	Western end of NC 41 concurrency
Harrells	27.9	44.9	US 421 (Delway Highway) / NC 41 east (Wallace Highway) – Clinton, Wilmington, Wallace	Eastern end of NC 41 concurrency
1.000 mi = 1.609 km; 1.000 km = 0.621 mi: Concurrency terminus
