= Columbus County Municipal Airport =

Airport in North Carolina, United States

- IATA: none; ICAO: KCPC; FAA LID: CPC

Summary
- Airport type: Public
- Owner: Columbus County
- Serves: Whiteville, North Carolina
- Elevation AMSL: 99 ft (30 m)
- Coordinates: 34°16′22″N 078°42′54″W

Map
- Location of airport in North Carolina

Runways
Direction	Length		Surface
Direction	ft	m	Surface
6/24	5,500	1,676	Asphalt

Statistics (2021)
- Aircraft operations (year ending 6/12/2021): 16,700
- Based aircraft: 32
- Source: Federal Aviation Administration

Columbus County Municipal Airport (ICAO: KCPC, FAA LID: CPC) is a county-owned, public-use airport in Columbus County, North Carolina, United States. It is located three nautical miles (6 km) south of the central business district of Whiteville, North Carolina. This airport is included in the National Plan of Integrated Airport Systems for 2011–2015, which categorized it as a general aviation facility.

Although most U.S. airports use the same three-letter location identifier for the FAA and IATA, this airport is assigned CPC by the FAA but has no designation from the IATA (which assigned CPC to Chapelco Airport in San Martín de los Andes, Neuquén Province, Argentina). The airport's ICAO identifier is KCPC.

== Facilities and aircraft ==
Columbus County Municipal Airport covers an area of 300 acres (121 ha) at an elevation of 99 feet (30 m) above mean sea level. It has one runway designated 6/24 with an asphalt surface measuring 5,500 by 75 feet (1,676 x 23 m).

For the 12-month period ending June 12, 2021, the airport had 16,700 aircraft operations, an average of 46 per day: 82% general aviation, 13% air taxi, and 6% military. At that time there were 32 aircraft based at this airport: 18 single-engine, 1 multi-engine, and 13 helicopter.

== See also ==
- List of airports in North Carolina
