= Evergreen, Tatums Township, Columbus County, North Carolina =

Evergreen, North Carolina
- Census-designated place
- Location within the state of North Carolina Evergreen (the United States)
- Coordinates: 34°24′53″N 78°54′41″W
- Country: United States
- State: North Carolina
- County: Columbus

Area
  - Total: 3.84 sq mi (9.94 km^{2})
  - Land: 3.84 sq mi (9.94 km^{2})
  - Water: 0 sq mi (0.00 km^{2})
- Elevation: 102 ft (31 m)

Population (2020)
  - Total: 336
  - Density: 87.6/sq mi (33.81/km^{2})
- Time zone: UTC-5 (Eastern (EST))
  - Summer (DST): UTC-4 (EDT)
- ZIP code: 28438
- FIPS code: 37-22080
- GNIS feature ID: 2628624

Evergreen is an unincorporated community and census-designated place (CDP) in Tatums Township, Columbus County, North Carolina, United States. It lies on North Carolina Highway 242, north of U.S. Route 74 and NC 130, at an elevation of 108 feet (33 m). The population was 420 at the 2010 census.

== Geography ==
Evergreen is located near the northwestern edge of Columbus County and is bordered to the northwest by the town of Boardman. U.S. Route 74, a four-lane highway, forms the southern edge of the CDP and leads northwest 19 miles (31 km) to Interstate 95 near Lumberton and southeast 14 miles (23 km) to Whiteville, the Columbus County seat.

According to the United States Census Bureau, the Evergreen CDP has a total area of 3.9 square miles (10.0 km^{2}), all land.

== Demographics ==
Historical population
Census	Pop.	Note	%±
2020	336		—
U.S. Decennial Census
