= Cerro Gordo, North Carolina =

Cerro Gordo
- Town
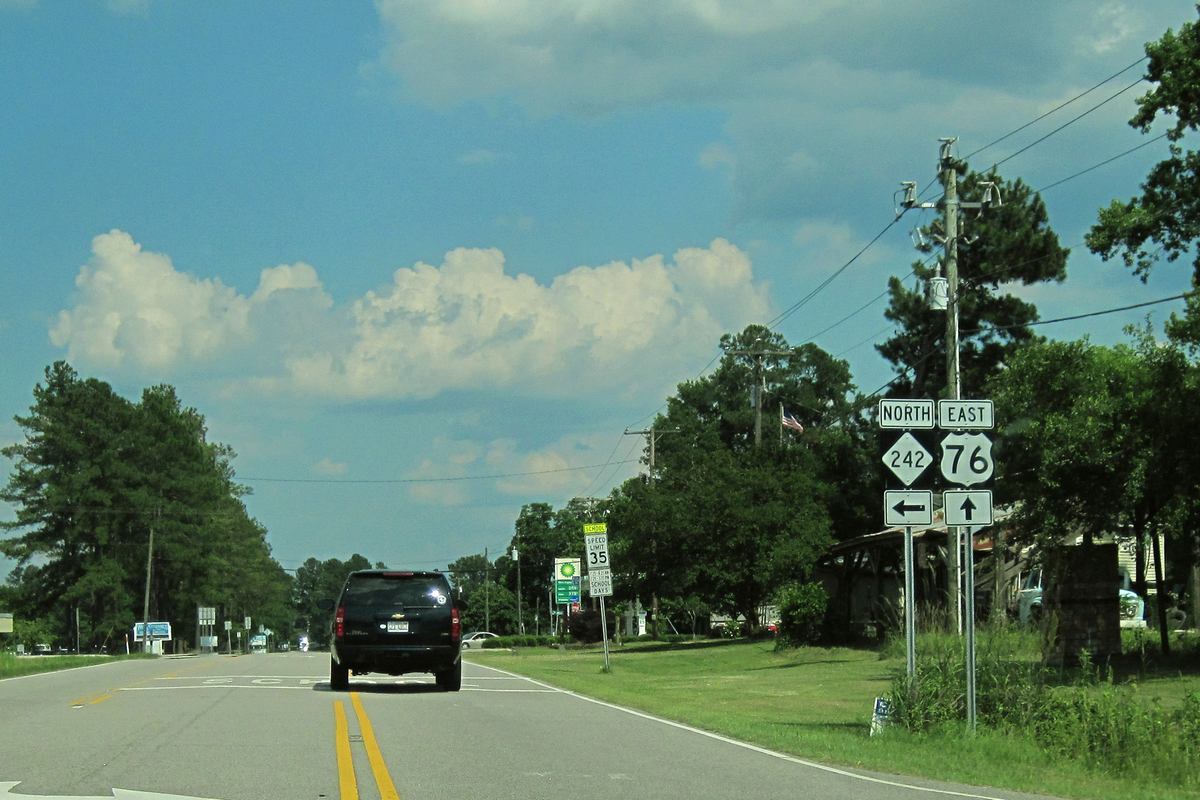
- Interactive map of Cerro Gordo
- Coordinates: 34°19′21″N 78°55′43″W
- Country: United States
- State: North Carolina
- County: Columbus

Government
  - Mayor: David Cliff White

Area
  - Total: 0.79 sq mi (2.05 km^{2})
  - Land: 0.79 sq mi (2.05 km^{2})
  - Water: 0 sq mi (0.00 km^{2})
- Elevation: 85 ft (26 m)

Population (2020)
  - Total: 131
  - Density: 165.9/sq mi (64.05/km^{2})
- Time zone: UTC-5 (Eastern (EST))
  - Summer (DST): UTC-4 (EDT)
- ZIP code: 28430
- Area codes: 910, 472
- FIPS code: 37-11620
- GNIS feature ID: 2406252

Cerro Gordo is a town in Columbus County, North Carolina, United States. The population was 131 at the 2020 census.

== History ==
Cerro Gordo was incorporated in 1874, taking its name from the 1847 Battle of Cerro Gordo in Mexico.

== Geography ==
According to the United States Census Bureau, the town has a total area of 0.8 square miles (2.1 km^{2}), all land.

The name Cerro Gordo (Spanish for 'fat hill') describes its slightly higher elevation than the rest of Columbus County, although it is located in the Coastal Plains region of North Carolina.

Like much of the county, the local economy of Cerro Gordo heavily relies on agriculture and hog production.

The ZIP Code for Cerro Gordo is 28430.

== Demographics ==
Historical population
Census	Pop.	Note	%±
1880	90		—
1890	129		43.3%
1900	123		−4.7%
1910	323		162.6%
1920	262		−18.9%
1930	325		24.0%
1940	379		16.6%
1950	265		−30.1%
1960	306		15.5%
1970	322		5.2%
1980	295		−8.4%
1990	227		−23.1%
2000	244		7.5%
2010	207		−15.2%
2020	131		−36.7%
U.S. Decennial Census

As of the census of 2000, there were 244 people, 90 households, and 68 families residing in the town. The population density was 322.8 inhabitants per square mile (124.6/km^{2}). There were 102 housing units at an average density of 134.9 per square mile (52.1/km^{2}). The racial makeup of the town was 75.00% White, 18.44% African American, 3.69% Native American, 2.46% Asian, and 0.41% from two or more races. Hispanic or Latino of any race were 2.46% of the population.

There were 90 households, out of which 34.4% had children under the age of 18 living with them, 63.3% were married couples living together, 11.1% had a female householder with no husband present, and 24.4% were non-families. 22.2% of all households were made up of individuals, and 15.6% had someone living alone who was 65 years of age or older. The average household size was 2.71 and the average family size was 3.21.

In the town, the population was spread out, with 27.9% under the age of 18, 7.4% from 18 to 24, 29.1% from 25 to 44, 20.1% from 45 to 64, and 15.6% who were 65 years of age or older. The median age was 36 years. For every 100 females, there were 89.1 males. For every 100 females age 18 and over, there were 81.4 males.

The median income for a household in the town was $20,000, and the median income for a family was $28,750. Males had a median income of $31,964 versus $22,500 for females. The per capita income for the town was $12,447. About 21.7% of families and 22.5% of the population were below the poverty line, including 12.5% of those under the age of eighteen and 14.3% of those 65 or over.

In 2022, the estimated population of Cerro Gordo was 352.

== Works cited ==
- Powell, William S. (1976). The North Carolina Gazetteer: A Dictionary of Tar Heel Places. Chapel Hill: The University of North Carolina Press. ISBN 9780807812471.
