= Whiteville, North Carolina =

- City
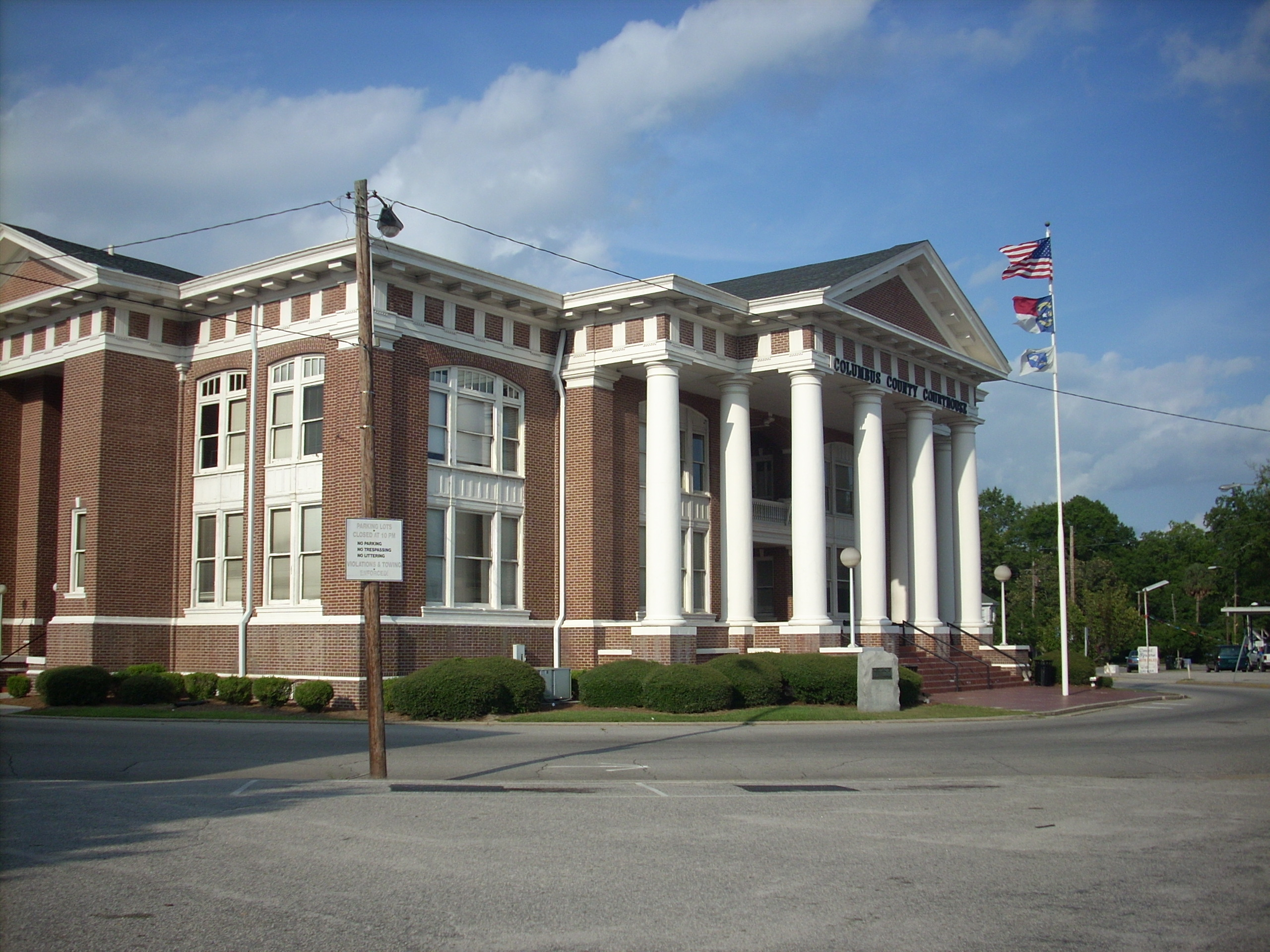
- Columbus County Courthouse in Whiteville

- Flag Seal
- Motto: "Citizens First"
- Location within the state of North Carolina
- Coordinates: 34°19′50″N 78°42′05″W
- Country: United States
- State: North Carolina
- County: Columbus
- Named for: James Bunbury White

Government
  - Mayor: Terry Mann

Area
  - Total: 5.56 sq mi (14.40 km^{2})
  - Land: 5.56 sq mi (14.40 km^{2})
  - Water: 0 sq mi (0.00 km^{2})
- Elevation: 98 ft (30 m)

Population (2020)
  - Total: 4,766
  - Density: 857.4/sq mi (331.06/km^{2})
- Time zone: UTC-5 (EST)
  - Summer (DST): UTC-4 (EDT)
- ZIP code: 28472
- Area codes: 910, 472
- FIPS code: 37-73660
- GNIS feature ID: 2405738
- Website: www.whitevillenc.gov

Whiteville is the county seat of and the most populous city in Columbus County, North Carolina, United States. As of the 2020 census, Whiteville had a population of 4,766.

== History ==
Columbus County was created in 1808. In 1810, an act authorized James Bunbury White to "lay off a town on his own lands in the county of Columbus" and appointed five commissioners, Isaac Powell, John Wingate, Arthur Simpson, William Burney and Warren Baldwin, "for the purpose of laying off a town on the lands of the said James B. White, in the county aforesaid, at the place fixed on to erect the public buildings for said county; which town, when laid off by said commissioners, or a majority of them, shall be named Whitesville, and the lots thereof shall be for the sole benefit and disposal of the said James B. White." Whiteville has had a post office since 1821. The town was sacked by Union forces during the latter stages of the American Civil War. The name Whitesville was officially changed to Whiteville by the U.S. Post Office in 1889.

In 1950, Whiteville fielded a professional minor league baseball team in the Class D Tobacco State League. The Whiteville Tobs club lasted only one season before disbanding with the entire league.

The Columbus County Courthouse was listed on the National Register of Historic Places in 1983.

== Geography ==
Whiteville is located in north-central Columbus County within the Carolina Border Belt, a regional network of tobacco markets and warehouses along both sides of the North Carolina-South Carolina border. Combined U.S. Routes 74 and 76 bypass the city on its north side and lead east 46 miles (74 km) to Wilmington. US 74 leads northwest 32 miles (51 km) to Lumberton, and US 76 leads west 67 miles (108 km) to Florence, South Carolina. U.S. Route 701 passes through the western side of Whiteville, leading north 23 miles (37 km) to Elizabethtown and southwest 44 miles (71 km) to Conway, South Carolina.

According to the United States Census Bureau, Whiteville has a total area of 5.4 square miles (14.1 km^{2}), all land.

=== Climate ===
Whiteville has a humid subtropical climate (Köppen: Cfa) with long, hot summers and short, mild winters.

Climate data for Whiteville 7 NW, North Carolina (1991–2020 normals, extremes 1903–present)
Month	Jan	Feb	Mar	Apr	May	Jun	Jul	Aug	Sep	Oct	Nov	Dec	Year
Record high °F (°C)	84 (29)	86 (30)	95 (35)	95 (35)	101 (38)	106 (41)	104 (40)	106 (41)	103 (39)	100 (38)	88 (31)	85 (29)	106 (41)
Mean maximum °F (°C)	75.3 (24.1)	78.1 (25.6)	83.1 (28.4)	87.5 (30.8)	92.4 (33.6)	96.0 (35.6)	97.8 (36.6)	96.8 (36.0)	92.8 (33.8)	87.6 (30.9)	81.4 (27.4)	76.7 (24.8)	98.7 (37.1)
Mean daily maximum °F (°C)	54.8 (12.7)	57.8 (14.3)	65.4 (18.6)	73.9 (23.3)	80.6 (27.0)	86.8 (30.4)	90.1 (32.3)	88.2 (31.2)	83.5 (28.6)	74.8 (23.8)	65.3 (18.5)	57.7 (14.3)	73.2 (22.9)
Daily mean °F (°C)	43.4 (6.3)	45.8 (7.7)	52.8 (11.6)	61.1 (16.2)	69.1 (20.6)	76.4 (24.7)	79.8 (26.6)	78.2 (25.7)	73.0 (22.8)	62.8 (17.1)	52.6 (11.4)	46.1 (7.8)	61.8 (16.6)
Mean daily minimum °F (°C)	31.9 (−0.1)	33.8 (1.0)	40.2 (4.6)	48.3 (9.1)	57.6 (14.2)	66.1 (18.9)	69.5 (20.8)	68.2 (20.1)	62.6 (17.0)	50.7 (10.4)	39.9 (4.4)	34.6 (1.4)	50.3 (10.2)
Mean minimum °F (°C)	17.6 (−8.0)	22.3 (−5.4)	26.2 (−3.2)	33.8 (1.0)	44.8 (7.1)	55.2 (12.9)	62.5 (16.9)	60.2 (15.7)	51.2 (10.7)	35.6 (2.0)	25.7 (−3.5)	21.8 (−5.7)	16.5 (−8.6)
Record low °F (°C)	8 (−13)	5 (−15)	10 (−12)	24 (−4)	31 (−1)	44 (7)	52 (11)	51 (11)	40 (4)	21 (−6)	14 (−10)	−2 (−19)	−2 (−19)
Average precipitation inches (mm)	3.47 (88)	3.31 (84)	3.73 (95)	3.53 (90)	4.21 (107)	4.61 (117)	5.27 (134)	5.91 (150)	6.64 (169)	3.51 (89)	3.22 (82)	3.47 (88)	50.88 (1,292)
Average snowfall inches (cm)	0.5 (1.3)	0.3 (0.76)	0.0 (0.0)	0.0 (0.0)	0.0 (0.0)	0.0 (0.0)	0.0 (0.0)	0.0 (0.0)	0.0 (0.0)	0.0 (0.0)	0.0 (0.0)	0.4 (1.0)	1.2 (3.0)
Average precipitation days (≥ 0.01 in)	9.3	9.0	9.2	7.9	8.9	9.8	10.4	11.5	9.1	7.0	7.7	9.3	109.1
Average snowy days (≥ 0.1 in)	0.5	0.2	0.0	0.0	0.0	0.0	0.0	0.0	0.0	0.0	0.0	0.2	0.9
Source: NOAA

== Demographics ==
Historical population
Census	Pop.	Note	%±
1890	372		—
1900	634		70.4%
1910	1,368		115.8%
1920	1,604		17.3%
1930	2,203		37.3%
1940	3,011		36.7%
1950	4,238		40.8%
1960	4,683		10.5%
1970	4,195		−10.4%
1980	5,565		32.7%
1990	5,078		−8.8%
2000	5,148		1.4%
2010	5,394		4.8%
2020	4,766		−11.6%
U.S. Decennial Census

=== 2020 census ===
As of the 2020 census, Whiteville had a population of 4,766. The median age was 43.6 years. 21.7% of residents were under the age of 18 and 23.2% of residents were 65 years of age or older. For every 100 females there were 81.2 males, and for every 100 females age 18 and over there were 77.5 males age 18 and over.

95.2% of residents lived in urban areas, while 4.8% lived in rural areas. Between 2010 and 2020, the town lost 11.64 percent of its population.

There were 2,130 households in Whiteville, of which 27.0% had children under the age of 18 living in them. Of all households, 27.2% were married-couple households, 21.6% were households with a male householder and no spouse or partner present, and 46.3% were households with a female householder and no spouse or partner present. About 41.8% of all households were made up of individuals and 20.4% had someone living alone who was 65 years of age or older.

There were 2,425 housing units, of which 12.2% were vacant. The homeowner vacancy rate was 3.8% and the rental vacancy rate was 6.4%.

Whiteville racial composition
Race	Number	Percentage
White (non-Hispanic)	2,253	47.27%
Black or African American (non-Hispanic)	1,963	41.19%
Native American	63	1.32%
Asian	39	0.82%
Other/Mixed	209	4.39%
Hispanic or Latino	239	5.01%

=== 2000 census ===
As of the census of 2000, there were 5,148 people, 2,191 households, and 1,336 families residing in the city. The population density was 957.5 inhabitants per square mile (369.7/km^{2}). There were 2,450 housing units at an average density of 455.7 per square mile (175.9/km^{2}). The racial makeup of the city was 60.51% White, 36.67% African American, 0.64% Native American, 0.74% Asian, 0.04% Pacific Islander, 0.56% from other races, and 0.84% from two or more races. Hispanic or Latino of any race were 0.93% of the population.

There were 2,191 households, out of which 27.9% had children under the age of 18 living with them, 38.1% were married couples living together, 20.4% had a female householder with no husband present, and 39.0% were non-families. 36.3% of all households were made up of individuals, and 16.4% had someone living alone who was 65 years of age or older. The average household size was 2.22 and the average family size was 2.88.

In the city, the population was spread out, with 24.1% under the age of 18, 7.8% from 18 to 24, 23.5% from 25 to 44, 24.4% from 45 to 64, and 20.1% who were 65 years of age or older. The median age was 41 years. For every 100 females, there were 77.8 males. For every 100 females age 18 and over, there were 72.9 males.

Less than a fourth of the citizens hold a bachelor's degree.

The median income for a household in the city was $25,455, and the median income for a family was $34,128. Males had a median income of $35,074 versus $23,000 for females. The per capita income for the city was $18,337. About 19.0% of families and 26.9% of the population were below the poverty line, including 37.0% of those under age 18 and 33.7% of those age 65 or over, resulting in over a third of the residents living in poverty.

== Education ==
The Whiteville City School system includes the following schools:

- Whiteville High School
- North Whiteville Academy
- Central Middle School
- Edgewood Elementary School
- Whiteville Primary School

Whiteville High School, home of the Wolfpack, competes in the NCHSAA 2A sports division and has won 19 state championships: nine in baseball (1983, 1985, 1989, 1991, 2012, 2014, 2015, 2017, and 2018), four individual track championships, one in team golf (1986), two in football (1965 and 1987), and three in basketball (1969, 1999, and 2000).

Waccamaw Academy, a segregation academy which opened in 1968, closed in 2012.

Southeastern Community College is located a few miles to the west of Whiteville.

== Arts and culture ==
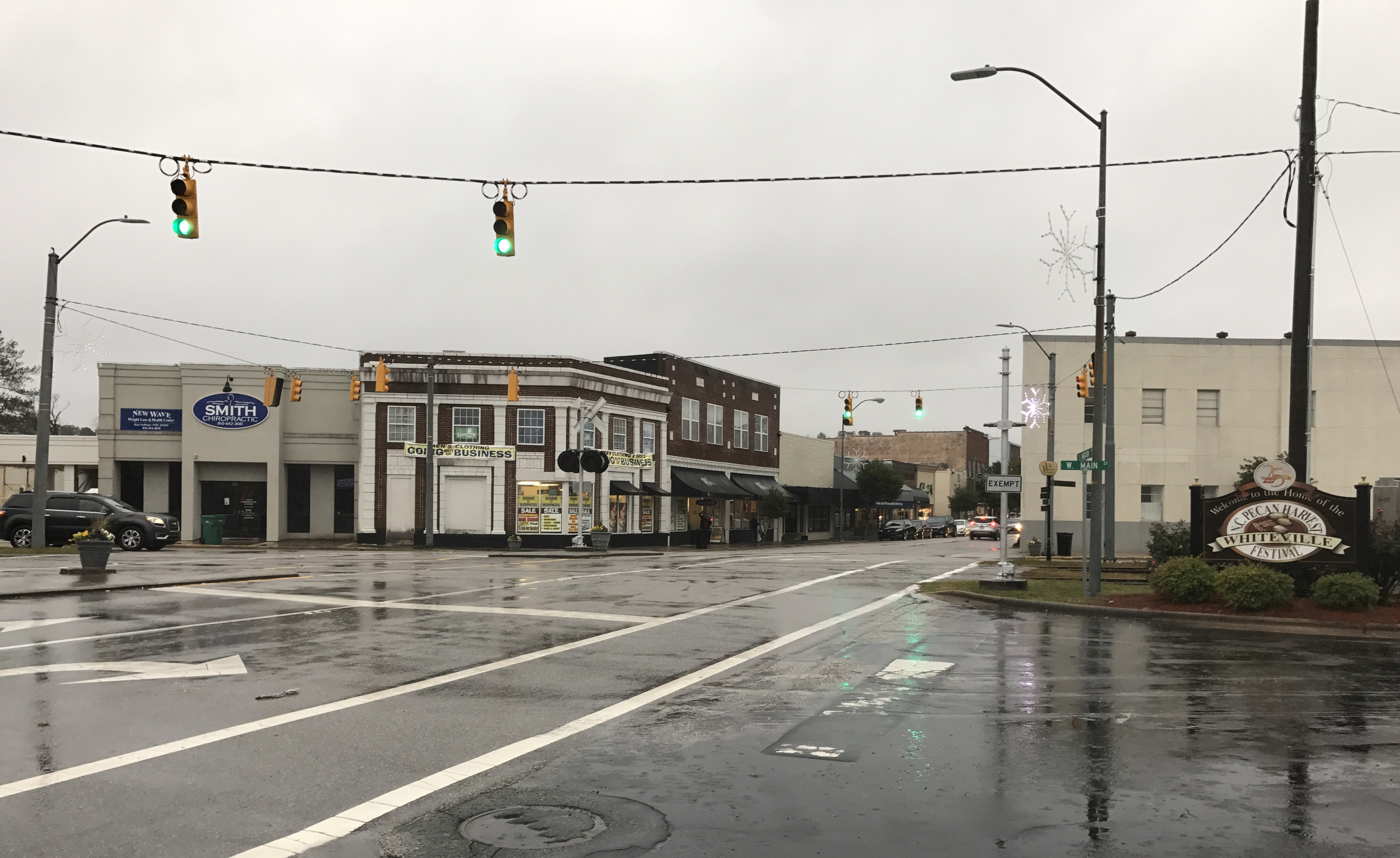
Downtown Whiteville

The city is the site of the North Carolina Museum of Natural Sciences at Whiteville, a satellite museum of the North Carolina Museum of Natural Sciences.

Annual events include the North Carolina Pecan Harvest Festival. In addition, the state-recognized Waccamaw Siouan Indians tribe holds an annual powwow in October with numerous public events.

The News Reporter, the official newspaper that serves Columbus County, is based in Whiteville. It has been published since 1896.

The stretch of U.S. Route 701 through Columbus County, known as James B. White Highway, is named for Whiteville's founder, James Bunbury White, who was elected as the first North Carolina senator from Columbus County.

== Representation in other media ==
- Whiteville was the site of filming for the courthouse-burning scene in the 1996 Bastard out of Carolina, adapted from Dorothy Allison's novel of the same name.

== Transportation ==
Although the railroad tracks leading from west of town toward Lake Waccamaw have long been disconnected, Whiteville is served by the Columbus County Municipal Airport and several highways, which include U.S. Route 74, U.S. Route 76, U.S. Route 701, North Carolina Highway 130, and North Carolina Highway 131.

== Notable people ==
- A. R. Ammons, poet
- Brooks Baldwin, MLB infielder
- Ulysses Currie, politician
- Dax Harwood, professional wrestler for AEW
- Dewey L. Hill, politician
- MacKenzie Gore, MLB pitcher
- Tommy Greene, MLB pitcher
- Pat Lennon, MLB outfielder
- Addison McDowell, U.S. representative for North Carolina
- Chester McGlockton, NFL defensive tackle
- Millie and Christine McKoy, conjoined twins
- Jane McNeill, stage, film, and television actress
- Ida Stephens Owens, first African American woman to earn a Ph.D. in physiology from Duke University in 1967
- Charlie Ripple, MLB pitcher
- Reggie Royals, American Basketball Association player
- Ralph E. Suggs, retired rear admiral in the United States Navy
- Chris Wilcox, NBA player
- Maggie Will, professional golfer
- Harvey D. Williams, African-American U.S. Army major general
- Mike Wright, MLB pitcher

== Works cited ==
- Corbitt, David Leroy (2000). The formation of the North Carolina counties, 1663-1943 (reprint ed.). Raleigh: North Carolina Division of Archives and History. OCLC 46398241.
- Justesen, Benjamin R. (2012). George Henry White: An Even Chance in the Race of Life (reprint ed.). Louisiana State University Press. ISBN 9780807144770.
- Powell, William S. (1976). The North Carolina Gazetteer: A Dictionary of Tar Heel Places. Chapel Hill: The University of North Carolina Press. ISBN 9780807812471.
