= Bladenboro, North Carolina =

- Town
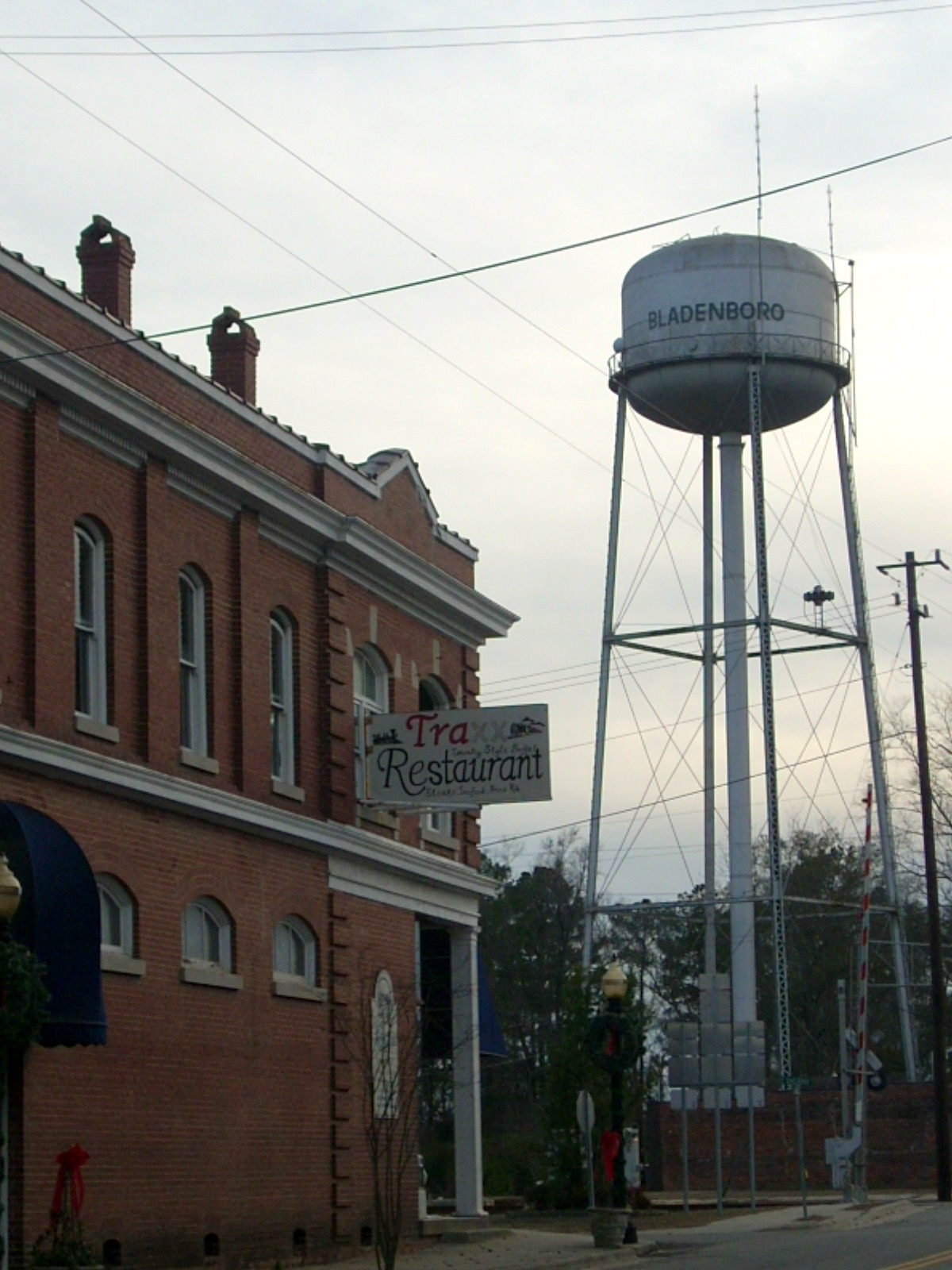
- The water tower in Bladenboro (now demolished)

- Seal

- Location in Bladen County and the state of North Carolina
- Coordinates: 34°32′27″N 78°47′41″W
- Country: United States
- State: North Carolina
- County: Bladen

Government
  - Type: Board of Commissioners
  - Mayor: David Hales

Area
  - Total: 2.22 sq mi (5.74 km^{2})
  - Land: 2.22 sq mi (5.74 km^{2})
  - Water: 0 sq mi (0.00 km^{2})
- Elevation: 102 ft (31 m)

Population (2020)
  - Total: 1,648
  - Density: 743.9/sq mi (287.24/km^{2})
- Time zone: UTC-5 (Eastern (EST))
  - Summer (DST): UTC-4 (EDT)
- ZIP code: 28320
- Area codes: 910, 472
- FIPS code: 37-06240
- GNIS feature ID: 2405277
- Website: www.bladenboronc.org

Bladenboro is a town in Bladen County, North Carolina, United States. At the 2020 census, the population was 1,648.

== History ==
=== Establishment and early years ===
Development around Bladenboro, a farming community also known in its earliest days for its turpentine and lumber, began to take off after a railroad was built through the area in 1859. In 1885, brothers R.L. and H.C. Bridger came to Bladenboro from Little River, South Carolina, to operate a turpentine business. They soon became involved in the timber business and operated a cotton gin. The brothers and their descendants would have a major effect on the shaping of the town and its economy for much of the next century. Major businesses, owned and operated by members of the Bridger family and which employed many area residents, have included Bridger Corporation (a farming supply company and general store no longer in operation), Bladenboro Cotton Mills (established in 1912 and later sold to become Highland Mills), and the Bank of Bladenboro (established in 1908 and now part of First Citizens Bank).

The town of Bladenboro was incorporated in 1903.

=== Beast of Bladenboro ===
In 1954, Bladenboro received national attention for several mysterious animal killings, mostly of dogs and livestock, in the area. The animals had broken jaws and had been drained of blood in a fashion not unlike the supposed attacks of Chupacabra. However, sightings describe the attacker as resembling a cat or wolf, which led to the local legend known as the "Beast of Bladenboro." In 2008, the History Channel television series Monster Quest performed an analysis concerning these attacks, which were beginning to happen again, and concluded that the attacker might have been a cougar.

=== Recent years ===
Bladenboro's downtown was heavily damaged by hurricanes Matthew and Florence.

== Geography ==
According to the United States Census Bureau, the town has a total area of 2.2 square miles (5.7 km^{2}), all land.

== Demographics ==
Historical population
Census	Pop.	Note	%±
1910	276		—
1920	459		66.3%
1930	587		27.9%
1940	724		23.3%
1950	796		9.9%
1960	774		−2.8%
1970	783		1.2%
1980	1,428		82.4%
1990	1,821		27.5%
2000	1,718		−5.7%
2010	1,750		1.9%
2020	1,648		−5.8%
U.S. Decennial Census

=== 2020 census ===
As of the 2020 census, Bladenboro had a population of 1,648. The median age was 42.3 years. 23.7% of residents were under the age of 18 and 20.5% of residents were 65 years of age or older. For every 100 females there were 80.1 males, and for every 100 females age 18 and over there were 79.5 males age 18 and over.

0.0% of residents lived in urban areas, while 100.0% lived in rural areas.

There were 747 households in Bladenboro, of which 29.9% had children under the age of 18 living in them. Of all households, 31.5% were married-couple households, 19.8% were households with a male householder and no spouse or partner present, and 43.0% were households with a female householder and no spouse or partner present. About 39.3% of all households were made up of individuals and 17.4% had someone living alone who was 65 years of age or older.

There were 851 housing units, of which 12.2% were vacant. The homeowner vacancy rate was 1.0% and the rental vacancy rate was 8.0%.

Racial composition as of the 2020 census
Race	Number	Percent
White	1,094	66.4%
Black or African American	395	24.0%
American Indian and Alaska Native	34	2.1%
Asian	8	0.5%
Native Hawaiian and Other Pacific Islander	0	0.0%
Some other race	39	2.4%
Two or more races	78	4.7%
Hispanic or Latino (of any race)	59	3.6%

=== 2000 census ===
As of the census of 2000, there were 1,718 people, 762 households, and 471 families residing in the town. The population density was 789.5 inhabitants per square mile (304.8/km^{2}). There were 832 housing units at an average density of 382.3 per square mile (147.6/km^{2}). The racial makeup of the town was 80.33% White, 17.81% African American, 0.93% Native American, 0.17% Pacific Islander, 0.47% from other races, and 0.29% from two or more races. Hispanic or Latino people of any race were 1.22% of the population.

There were 762 households, out of which 26.1% had children under the age of 18 living with them, 42.8% were married couples living together, 15.0% had a female householder with no husband present, and 38.1% were non-families. 36.0% of all households were made up of individuals, and 18.1% had someone living alone who was 65 years of age or older. The average household size was 2.19 and the average family size was 2.83.

In the town, the population was spread out, with 22.8% under the age of 18, 6.5% from 18 to 24, 24.9% from 25 to 44, 25.3% from 45 to 64, and 20.4% who were 65 years of age or older. The median age was 42 years. For every 100 females, there were 85.5 males. For every 100 females age 18 and over, there were 78.0 males.

The median income for a household in the town was $19,300, and the median income for a family was $30,900. Males had a median income of $28,438 versus $21,154 for females. The per capita income for the town was $15,102. About 23.2% of families and 30.0% of the population were below the poverty line, including 46.9% of those under age 18 and 23.9% of those age 65 or over.

== Notable people ==
- Paul V. Nolan (1923-2009), Tennessee state legislator, 1969–1970.

Professional athlete Trelonnie Owens graduated from Bladenboro High School. He led the Bulldogs to the state 1-A title in 1990 and was named player of the year by the NCHSAA. Owens played collegiately at Wake Forest. He had a productive professional career playing professional basketball. Most of his pro years were spent in South America. Owens played for the Uruguay national basketball team at the 2003 and 2004 South American Basketball Championships, as well as the men's basketball tournament at the 2003 Pan American Games and the 2003 Tournament of the Americas.

https://www.wwaytv3.com/bladen-countys-trelonnie-owens-named-assistant-basketball-coach-south-view/

https://es.m.wikipedia.org/wiki/Trelonnie_Owens

== Schools ==
Public schools, part of the Bladen County Schools, include:

- Bladenboro Primary School (grades K-4)
- Bladenboro Middle School (grades 5–8)
- West Bladen High School (grades 9–12)

Former public schools include:

- Bladenboro High School (consolidated with Tar Heel High School to form West Bladen High School)
- Bladenboro Primary School (now part of Bladenboro Elementary School)
- Spaulding Monroe Middle School (now part of Bladenboro Middle School)
- Spaulding Monroe High School (consolidated with Bladenboro High School, which later consolidated with Tar Heel High School to form West Bladen High School)
