= List of U.S. Highways in North Carolina =

U.S. Highways of North Carolina

System information
- Maintained by NCDOT
- Length: 5,588.28 mi (8,993.46 km)
- Formed: November 11, 1926

Highway names
- US Highways: U.S. Highway nn (US nn)

System links
- North Carolina Highway System; Interstate; US; State; Scenic

There are 36 U.S. Highways that exist entirely or partially in the state of North Carolina. In North Carolina, all U.S. Highways are maintained by the North Carolina Department of Transportation (NCDOT).

== U.S. Highways ==
Number	Length (mi)	Length (km)	Southern or western terminus	Northern or eastern terminus	Formed	Removed	Notes
US 1	174.1	280.2	US 1 at the SC state line	US 1 at the VA state line	1926	current	
US 13	189.1	304.3	I-95/I-295 in Eastover	US 13 at the VA state line	1952	current	
US 15	158.5	255.1	US 15 at the SC state line	US 15 at the VA state line	1926	current	
US 17	284.0	457.1	US 17 at the SC state line	US 17 at the VA state line	1926	current	
US 17-1	183.7	295.6	US 17/NC 20 in Wilmington	US 17-1 at the VA state line	1926	1932	Replaced by US 117 and US 301.
US 19	145.0	233.4	US 19/US 129/SR 11 at the GA state line	US 19E/US 19W in Cane River	1926	current	
US 19E	44.9	72.3	US 19/US 19W in Cane River	US 19E at the TN state line	1930	current	
US 19W	21.9	35.2	US 19/US 19E in Cane River	US 19W at the TN state line	1930	current	
US 21	124.3	200.0	I-77/US 21 at the SC state line	US 21/US 221 at the VA state line	1926	current	
US 23	106.0	170.6	US 23/US 441/SR 15 at the GA state line	I-26/US 23 at the TN state line	1930	current	
US 25	75.4	121.3	US 25 at the SC state line	US 25/US 70/SR 9 at the TN state line	1926	current	
US 29	168.0	270.4	US 29 at the SC state line	US 29 at the VA state line	1926	current	
US 52	150.0	241.4	US 52 at the SC state line	US 52 at the VA state line	1934	current	
US 64	608.4	979.1	US 64/US 74/SR 40 at the TN state line	US 158/NC 12 in Nags Head	1932	current	Longest numbered route in North Carolina.
US 70	488.0	785.4	US 25/US 70/SR 9 at the TN state line	School Drive in Atlantic	1926	current	
US 74	451.8	727.1	US 64/US 74/SR 40 at the TN state line	Turnaround in Wrightsville Beach	1926	current	
US 76	80.4	129.4	US 76 at the SC state line	Water Street in Wrightsville Beach	1934	current	
US 117	114.0	183.5	Port of Wilmington	US 301 near Wilson	1932	current	
US 121	64.0	103.0	US 70/NC 10 in Lexington	US 121 at the VA state line	1926	1934	Replaced by US 52.
US 129	63.6	102.4	US 19/US 129/SR 11 at the GA state line	US 129/SR 115 at the TN state line	1934	current	
US 158	350.2	563.6	US 64/US 601 in Mocksville	US 64/NC 12 in Nags Head	1932	current	
US 170	141.1	227.1	US 74/NC 20/NC 27 in Charlotte	US 170 at the VA state line	1926	1932	Replaced by US 29.
US 176	19.3	31.1	US 25 Bus./NC 225 in Hendersonville	US 176 at the SC state line	1926	current	
US 178	6.4	10.3	US 178 at the SC state line	US 64 near Rosman	1932	current	
US 217	126.7	203.9	US 217 at the SC state line	US 17-1/NC 40 in Wilson	1926	1932	Replaced by US 301.
US 220	123.4	198.6	US 1 in Rockingham	US 220 at the VA state line	1935	current	
US 221	153.0	246.2	US 221 at the SC state line	US 21/US 221 at the VA state line	1930	current	
US 258	152.0	244.6	US 17 Bus./NC 24 Bus. in Jacksonville	US 258 at the VA state line	1932	current	
US 264	215.7	347.1	I-440/US 64/US 64 Bus. in Raleigh	US 64 in Manns Harbor	1932	current	
US 276	62.9	101.2	US 276 at the SC state line	I-40 in Cove Creek	1932	current	
US 301	193.7	311.7	US 301/US 501 at the SC state line	US 301 at the VA state line	1932	current	
US 311	59.2	95.3	I-74 in Walkertown	US 311 at the VA state line	1926	current	Shortened to Walkertown in 2024.
US 321	217.2	349.5	US 321 at the SC state line	US 321/SR 159 at the TN state line	1930	current	
US 401	173.8	279.7	US 401 at the SC state line	I-85/US 1 near Wise	1957	current	
US 411	112.3	180.7	US 74 in Rockingham	US 311 in Madison	1932	1935	Replaced by US 220.
US 421	328.0	527.9	Boat launch and lot in Fort Fisher	US 421/SR 34 at the TN state line	1930	current	
US 441	64.5	103.8	US 23/US 441/SR 15 at the GA state line	US 441/SR 71 at the TN state line	1951	current	
US 501	170.0	273.6	US 301/US 501 at the SC state line	US 501 at the VA state line	1926	current	
US 521	3.8	6.1	US 521 at the SC state line	I-485 in Charlotte	1932	current	
US 601	133.6	215.0	US 601 at the SC state line	US 52 in Mount Airy	1932	current	
US 701	109.9	176.9	US 701 at the SC state line	US 301/NC 96 in Four Oaks	1932	current	
Former

== Alternate routes ==
Since the 1930s, North Carolina has utilized alternate routes for various needs (business, bypass, or spur). In 1960, the state began utilizing special routes, which converted many alternate routes to business loops. Currently, 15 alternate routes traverse the state; most use the "A" suffix, while a few recent route additions in the eastern half of the state are signed "alternate."

Route	Southern or western terminus	Northern or eastern terminus	mi	km	Established	Deleted	Description
US 1A	Southern Pines		0	0.0	1957	1962	Notes.
US 1A	Sanford		0	0.0	1957	1960	Notes.
US 1A	Cary	Raleigh	0	0.0	1933	1935	Notes.
US 1A	Raleigh		0	0.0	1946	1948	Notes.
US 1A	Raleigh		0	0.0	1948	1957	Notes.
US 1A	Wake Forest	Youngsville	9.0	14.5	1953	—	Notes.
US 1A	Franklinton		2.7	4.3	1953	—	Notes.
US 1A	Henderson		0	0.0	1957	1960	Notes.
US 13A	Windsor		2.2	3.5	1957	1960	Notes.
US 15A	SC line near Laurinburg	Creedmoor	0	0.0	1936	1957	Notes.
US 15A	Sanford		6.5	10.5	1957	1960	Notes.
US 15A	Chapel Hill		4.3	6.9	1953	1960	Notes.
US 17A	Williamston		0	0.0	1954	1960	Notes.
US 17A	Windsor		0	0.0	1954	1960	Notes.
US 17A	Elizabeth City		0	0.0	1953	1960	Notes.
US 19A	Ela	Lake Junaluska	0	0.0	1947	1948	The first Ela–Lake Junaluska route traversed via Cherokee and Maggie Valley. The following year, it was switch with US 19.
US 19A	Ela	Lake Junaluska	0	0.0	1948	1987	The second Ela–Lake Junaluska route traversed via Sylva and Waynesville. It was replaced by US 74.
US 19A	Waynesville		0	0.0	1939	1948	Alternate route through downtown Waynesville, in concurrency with US 23A. Was decommissioned with US 19 was rerouted away from Waynesville.
US 19A	Asheville		2.3	3.7	1949	1960	Alternate route through downtown Asheville, in concurrency with US 23A. Replaced by US 19 Business.
US 23A	Waynesville		0	0.0	1939	1968	Alternate route through downtown Waynesville, in concurrency with US 19A, until 1948. Replaced by US 23 Business.
US 23A	Clyde	Canton	11.1	17.9	1962	1971	Alternate route used as a connector route for a completed section of I-40, bypassing Clyde and Canton.
US 23A	Asheville		2.3	3.7	1949	1960	Alternate route through downtown Asheville, in concurrency with US 19A. Replaced by US 23 Business.
US 23A	California	Faust	11.1	17.9	2006	—	Alternate route which provides access to Wolf Laurel, which is a gated community and ski resort.
US 25A	Hendersonville		1.0	1.6	1944	1960	Alternate route in downtown Hendersonville, via Church Street. Replaced by southbound US 25.
US 25A	Arden	Asheville	8.5	13.7	1934	—	Provides an alternate route bypassing Skyland and Biltmore Forest.
US 29A	Kings Mountain	Gastonia	10.0	16.1	1937	1938	Provided an alternate route through Bessemer City, in concurrency with US 74A. Replaced by NC 161 and NC 274.
US 29A	Kannapolis	China Grove	0	0.0	1938	1940	Provided an alternate bypass route through Kannapolis, Landis and China Grove. Replaced by US 29.
US 29A	Kannapolis	China Grove	0	0.0	1940	1948	Provided an alternate route through downtown Kannapolis, Landis and China Grove. Replaced by US 29.
US 29A	Kannapolis	China Grove	0	0.0	1948	1997	Provided an alternate route from University City area, in Charlotte, to China Grove. In 1954, its southern terminus was truncated between Concord and Kannapolis. Was decommissioned and downgraded to secondary roads.
US 29A	Salisbury		0.5	0.8	1945	1954	Alternate route in downtown Salisbury, via Bank, Lee and Liberty Streets.
US 29A	Lexington		3.8	6.1	1952	1960	Alternate route through downtown Lexington. Replaced by US 29 Business.
US 29A	Thomasville		0	0.0	1952	1957	Alternate route through downtown Thomasville. Was absorbed by US 29A from High Point.
US 29A	High Point		0	0.0	1934	1948	Alternate route through downtown High Point. Replaced by US 29.
US 29A	High Point	Greensboro	0	0.0	1948	1991	Alternate route from north of Thomasville, through downtown High Point and Greensboro. Historically went further west through Thomasville until 1960. Was downgraded to secondary roads, except for English Road, which continued as NC 68.
US 29A	Greensboro		0	0.0	1938	1957	Alternate route in downtown Greensboro, in concurrency with US 70A. Was downgraded to secondary roads.
US 29A	Reidsville		5.3	8.5	1957	1960	Alternate route through downtown Reidsville. Replaced by US 29 Business.
US 52A	Pilot Mountain		0	0.0	1949	1960	Alternate route through downtown Pilot Mountain. Replaced by US 52 Business.
US 52A	Mount Airy		0	0.0	1953	1960	Alternate route through downtown Mount Airy. Replaced by US 52 Business.
US 64A	Brevard		1.1	1.8	1943	1960	Alternate route through downtown Brevard. Replaced by US 64 Business.
US 64A	Bat Cave	Morganton	0	0.0	1940	1948	Alternate route that traveled from Bat Cave, through Ruth, to Morganton. Replaced by US 64.
US 64A	Statesville		0	0.0	1954	1960	Alternate route through downtown Statesville. Replaced by US 64 Business.
US 64A	Franklinville	Ramseur	0	0.0	1941	1957	Alternate route that traveled through Franklinville and Ramseur. Was downgraded to secondary roads, with a section to NC 22.
US 64A	Siler City		0	0.0	1952	1957	Alternate route that traveled through downtown Siler City. Was downgraded to a secondary road.
US 64 ALT	Spring Hope		11.0	17.7	1979	—	Alternate route through downtown Spring Hope.
US 64A	Rocky Mount		0	0.0	1934	1949	Alternate route in downtown Rocky Mount, via Thomas Avenue. Replaced by US 64.
US 64 ALT	Rocky Mount	Tarboro	14.2	22.9	1987	—	Alternate route that connects between Rocky Mount and Tarboro.
US 64 ALT	Princeville	Williamston	31.6	50.9	1996	—	Alternate route that travels from Princeville, through Bethel, Parmele, and Robersonville, to Williamston.
US 64A	Williamston		0	0.0	1954	1960	Alternate route in downtown Williamston. Replaced by US 64 Business.
US 64A	Columbia		0	0.0	1954	1960	Alternate route in downtown Columbia. Replaced by US 64 Business.
US 70A	Morganton		3.7	6.0	1938	1953	Alternate route through downtown Morganton. Was downgraded to secondary roads.
US 70A	Hildebran	Conover	0	0.0	1946	1948	Provided an alternate bypass route south of Hickory. Replaced by US 70.
US 70A	Hildebran	Conover	0	0.0	1948	1957	Provided an alternate route through downtown Hickory. Was downgraded to secondary roads.
US 70A	Salisbury		1.8	2.9	1938	1957	Alternate route in Salisbury. Replaced by US 70.
US 70A	Lexington		0	0.0	1952	1960	Alternate route through downtown Lexington. Replaced by US 70 Business.
US 70A	High Point	Greensboro	0	0.0	1956	1991	Alternate route that traversed from downtown High Point, through Jamestown, to Greensboro; in concurrency with US 29A, except in High Point. Historically went further west through Thomasville, until 1960, and further east to Efland, until 1963. Replaced by NC 68 in High Point and downgraded to secondary roads in Greensboro.
US 70A	High Point		0	0.0	1934	1948	Provided an alternate bypass route in High Point. Replaced by US 70.
US 70A	High Point		0	0.0	1948	1957	Alternate route through downtown High Point, in concurrency with US 29A. Was decommissioned when US 70A replaced US 70 through High Point.
US 70A	Greensboro		0	0.0	1938	1957	Alternate route in downtown Greensboro, in concurrency with US 29A. Was downgraded to secondary roads.
US 70A	Hillsborough		0	0.0	1942	1948	Provided an alternate bypass route in Hillsborough. Replaced by US 70.
US 70A	Hillsborough		0	0.0	1948	1960	Provided an alternate route through downtown Hillsborough. Replaced by US 70 Business.
US 70A	Durham	Raleigh	0	0.0	1934	1948	Provided an alternate route through downtown Durham and then to Raleigh. Replaced by US 70.
US 70A	Durham		0	0.0	1948	1960	Provided an alternate route through downtown Durham and historically to Raleigh, through Cary, until 1956. Replaced by US 70 Business.
US 70A	Smithfield		0	0.0	1949	1953	Provided an alternate route along Second and Hancock Streets in downtown Smithfield. Was downgraded to secondary roads.
US 70A	Pine Level		0	0.0	1954	—	Alternate route that connects Pine Level with nearby Selma and Princeton.
US 70A	Goldsboro		0	0.0	1957	1960	Provided an alternate route through downtown Goldsboro. Replaced by US 70 Business.
US 70A	Kinston		0	0.0	1957	1960	Provided an alternate route through downtown Kinston. Replaced by US 70 Business.
US 74A	Asheville	Forest City	60.0	96.6	1994	—	Alternate route that travels through downtown Asheville, connecting the cities and communities of Bat Cave, Lake Lure, Rutherfordton, Ruth and Forest City.
US 74A	Rutherfordton		2.2	3.5	1949	1960	Provided an alternate route through downtown Rutherfordton. Replaced by US 74 Business.
US 74A	Shelby		6.2	10.0	1936	1960	Provided an alternate route through downtown Shelby. Replaced by US 74 Business.
US 74A	Kings Mountain	Gastonia	10.0	16.1	1937	1938	Provided an alternate route through Bessemer City, in concurrency with US 29A. Replaced by NC 161 and NC 274.
US 74A	Monroe		0	0.0	1949	1952	Provided an alternate bypass in downtown Monroe, via Jefferson Street. Was downgraded to secondary roads.
US 74A	Monroe		0	0.0	1952	1954	Provided an alternate route through downtown Monroe. Was downgraded to secondary roads.
US 74A	Rockingham		0	0.0	1953	1957	Provided an alternate route through downtown Rockingham, via Washington Street and Rockingham Road. Was downgraded to secondary roads.
US 74 ALT	Maxton	Lumberton	15.5	24.9	2008	—	Alternate route that connects to nearby Pembroke.
US 74A	Leland		0.14	0.2	1936	1975	Provided an alternate route at the intersection that US 74 cuts a corner from; was shortest U.S. alternate route in state. Was downgraded to secondary roads.
US 74A	Wrightsville Beach		0	0.0	1938	1940	Provided an alternate spur from Causeway Drive south along Waynick Boulevard. Replaced by US 76.
US 117A	Burgaw		2.0	3.2	1953	1960	Provided an alternate route through downtown Shelby. Replaced by US 117 Business.
US 117 ALT	Calypso	Brogden	12.6	20.3	1988	—	Alternate route through downtown Calypso, Mount Olive and Brogden.
US 117A	Goldsboro		2.8	4.5	1952	1960	Provided an alternate route through downtown Goldsboro. Replaced by US 117 Business.
US 117 ALT	Goldsboro	Wilson	23.4	37.7	2006	2009	Alternate route that traversed from Goldsboro, through Pikeville and Fremont, to Wilson. Replaced by US 117.
US 158A	Oxford		4.7	7.6	1954	1971	Was an alternate spur route that provided a partial bypass of Oxford, connecting US 158 to US 15. Replaced by I-85.
US 158A	Henderson		8.5	13.7	1951	1960	Provided an alternate route through downtown Henderson. Replaced by US 158 Business.
US 158A	Warrenton		7.5	12.1	1951	1960	Provided an alternate route through downtown Warrenton. Replaced by US 158 Business.
US 158A	Gatesville		4.9	7.9	1948	1960	Provided an alternate route through downtown Gatesville. Replaced by US 158 Business.
US 220 ALT	Candor	Seagrove	27.5	44.3	1979	—	Alternate route that traverses through Candor, Biscoe, Star and Seagrove.
US 221A	SC line near Cliffside	Rutherfordton	26.2	42.2	1941	—	Alternate route that traverses from the Chesnee, South Carolina to Rutherfordton; it connects the communities and cities of Cliffside, Henrietta, Caroleen, Alexander Mills, Forest City and Spindale.
US 264 ALT	Zebulon	Greenville	64.3	103.5	1980	—	Alternate route that traverses through Middlesex, Wilson and Greenville.
US 264A	Wilson		2.0	3.2	1950	1960	Provided an alternate route through downtown Wilson. Replaced by US 264 Business.
US 264 ALT	Wilson	Greenville	37.8	60.8	1988	2003	Provided an alternate route from west of Wilson, bypassing south of Farmville and designated on the southern half of Greenville Boulevard, in Greenville. It was absorbed by US 264 ALT, from Zebulon.
US 264A	Farmville		8.3	13.4	1955	1988	Provided an alternate route through downtown Farmville. West of Main Street was replaced by NC 121, while east was downgraded to a secondary road.
US 264A	Greenville		6.2	10.0	1957	1960	Provided an alternate route through downtown Greenville. Replaced by US 264 Business.
US 264A	Belhaven		2.9	4.7	1957	1960	Provided an alternate route through downtown Belhaven. Replaced by US 264 Business.
US 301A	Lumberton		0	0.0	1954	1960	Provided an alternate route through downtown Lumberton. Replaced by US 301 Business.
US 301A	Fayetteville		0	0.0	1952	1960	Provided an alternate route through downtown Fayetteville. Replaced by US 301 Business.
US 301A	Wilson		0	0.0	1957	1960	Provided an alternate route through downtown Wilson. Replaced by US 301 Business.
US 301A	Rocky Mount		0	0.0	1954	1960	Provided an alternate route through downtown Rocky Mount. Replaced by US 301 Business.
US 301A	Halifax		1.1	1.8	1952	1960	Provided an alternate route through downtown Halifax. Replaced by US 301 Business.
US 321A	Lincolnton		3.4	5.5	1956	1960	Provided an alternate route through downtown Lincolnton. Was downgraded to secondary roads.
US 321A	Granite Falls	Lenoir	11.8	19.0	1948	—	Alternate route through Granite Falls, Sawmills and Hudson.
US 321A	Lenoir		5.9	9.5	1941	1948	Provided an alternate bypass route east of Lenoir. Was replaced by US 321.
US 401A	Laurinburg		4.4	7.1	1957	1960	Provided an alternate route through downtown Laurinburg. Was replaced by US 401 Business.
US 421A	Clinton		0	0.0	1952	1960	Provided an alternate route through downtown Clinton. Was replaced by US 421 Business.
US 421A	North Wilkesboro		4.3	6.9	1957	1969	Provided an alternate route through downtown North Wilkesboro. Was replaced by US 421 Business.
US 501A	Sanford		6.5	10.5	1957	1960	Provided an alternate route through downtown Sanford. Was replaced by US 501 Business.
US 501A	Chapel Hill		4.3	6.9	1953	1960	Provided an alternate route through downtown Chapel Hill. Was replaced by US 501 Business.
US 501A	Roxboro		0	0.0	1949	1960	Provided an alternate route through downtown Roxboro. Was replaced by US 501 Business.
US 701A	Clinton		0	0.0	1948	1957	Provided an alternate route through downtown Clinton. It was downgraded to secondary roads.
