= U.S. Route 501 =

Highway in the United States

U.S. Route 501
- US 501 highlighted in red

Route information
- Auxiliary route of US 1
- Length: 355 mi (571 km)
- Existed: 1935–present

Major junctions
- South end: US 17 Bus. in Myrtle Beach, SC
- US 17 in Myrtle Beach, SC; US 76 in Marion, SC; US 301 in Latta, SC; I-95 near Dillon, SC; I-74 / US 74 in Laurinburg, NC; US 421 in Sanford, NC; I-40 in Durham, NC; I-85 / US 70 in Durham, NC; US 58 / US 360 in South Boston, VA; US 29 / US 460 in Lynchburg, VA
- North end: US 60 in Buena Vista, VA

Location
- Country: United States
- States: South Carolina, North Carolina, Virginia
- Counties: SC: Horry, Marion, Dillon; NC: Robeson, Scotland, Hoke, Moore, Lee, Chatham, Orange, Durham, Person; VA: Halifax, Campbell, City of Lynchburg, Bedford, Amherst, Rockbridge, City of Buena Vista

Highway system
- United States Numbered Highway System; List; Special; Divided
← SC 496	SC	→ SC 512
← I-485	NC	→ US 521
← I-495	VA	→ US 522

U.S. Route 501 (US 501) is a spur of U.S. Route 1. It runs 355 miles (571 km) from Buena Vista, Virginia at U.S. Route 60 to Myrtle Beach, South Carolina at U.S. Route 17 Business. It passes through the states of Virginia, North Carolina and South Carolina. From Durham to Laurinburg, a 108-mile (174 km) section of US 501 overlaps U.S. Route 15. Sections of US 15/US 501 also share routings with U.S. Route 1 in sections near Sanford, North Carolina and Aberdeen, North Carolina.

== Route description ==
Lengths
	mi	km
SC	74	119
NC	211	340
VA	145	233
Total	430	690

=== South Carolina ===
US 501 in South Carolina is a north–south United States highway that traverses 73.8 miles (118.8 km); it is one of main routes to the Grand Strand. US 501 begins at US 17 Bus. in Myrtle Beach, South Carolina. From Myrtle Beach to Marion, US 501 is a multilane highway, some sections divided, some undivided, mostly with at-grade intersections but having a number of interchanges along the length. The first of these interchanges is with US 17, which is a cloverleaf interchanges that includes railroad crossings at the ramps along the east side. After the bridge over the Intracoastal Waterway it has two more interchanges with local roads. Next there is an unusual hybrid interchange with South Carolina Highway 31, similar to a cloverstack, with elements of a trumpet interchange, in which two flyover ramps from SC 31 to US 501 exit left from SC 31 and wrap around the interchange's loop ramps. After this interchange, this limited-access portion comes to an end. US 501 passes through the city of Conway where it has a short overlap with U.S. Route 701. South of Aynor it serves as the western terminus of SC 22, which has another unconventional interchange, and various interchanges can also be found along the road before reaching Marion, where US 501 bypasses the town to the east. North of Marion, US 501 meets SC 38, a connector to Interstate 95. From SC 38, US 501 heads to the northeast, meeting US 301 in Latta. US 301 merges with US 501, forming a concurrency through Dillon to the North Carolina border, where it passes South of the Border prior to simultaneously exiting South Carolina and interchanging with Interstate 95 near Hamer in Dillon County.

=== North Carolina ===
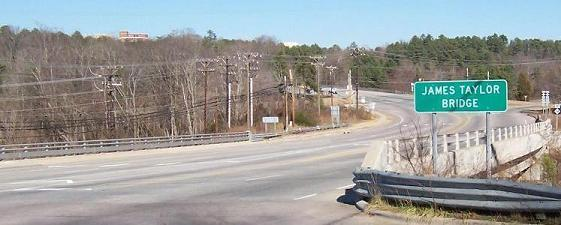
James Taylor Bridge, Chapel Hill, North Carolina, part of the US 15/US 501 route

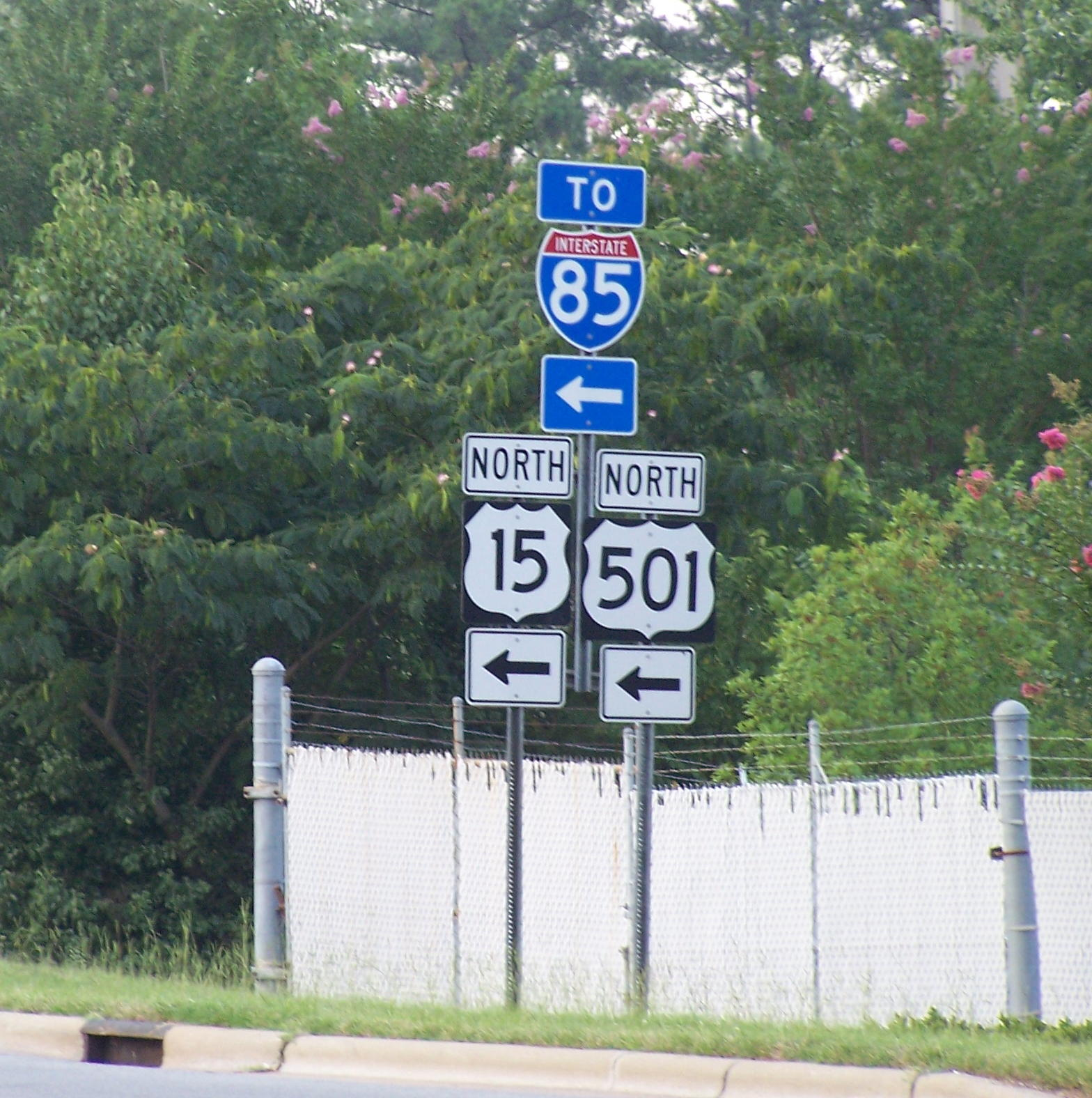
An entrance to US 15/US 501 in Durham

US 501 is a north–south United States highway that traverses the majority of North Carolina in concurrency with US 15. It enters North Carolina at the South Carolina state line with an intersection of Interstate 95 (I-95) while overlapping US 301, near South of the Border. It goes northwest through Rowland where the overlap with US 301 terminates, and then travels through Raemon to Laurinburg. Once at Laurinburg, it overlaps briefly with I-74/US 74 before connecting with US 15. The majority of the route, to this point, is a two-lane rural road.

Merging with US 15, it becomes what is known by local residents as "15-501" ("Fifteen Five-o-one"), a concurrency that extends for 106 miles (171 km) across central North Carolina. After Laurinburg it goes north to Aberdeen, linking briefly with US 1 before continuing to Pinehurst. In Pinehurst, US 15/US 501 goes through a roundabout then continues north through Carthage, then back to US 1. After traveling through Sanford on another brief concurrency with US 1, it exits off the freeway and goes due north to Pittsboro. After Pittsboro, US 15/US 501 goes through Chapel Hill and then into Durham. NCDOT has been trying to remedy traffic problems by making the route a superstreet for better traffic flow. In Durham, US 15/US 501 upgrades to an urban freeway, allowing for quick access to Interstate 85, and from south Durham to north; the freeway ends merging into I-85. At exit 176B on I-85, US 501 splits off towards Roxboro, while US 15 continues with I-85 towards Oxford.

After Durham, US 501 goes north to Roxboro, then into South Boston, Virginia after crossing the state line; the majority of this section is a four-lane expressway.

=== Virginia ===
==== North Carolina to Lynchburg ====
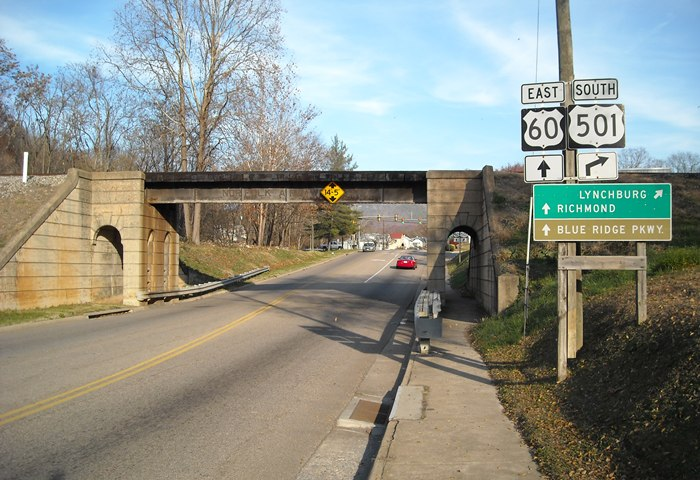
Northern terminus of US 501 at US 60 in Buena Vista, Virginia

US 501 enters Halifax County, Virginia south of Cluster Springs. The U.S. Highway is a two-lane road at the North Carolina state line but immediately expands to a four-lane divided highway named Huell Matthews Highway. US 501 parallels the Mayo River north to the hamlet of Mayo, where the highway meets the western end of SR 96 (Virgilina Road) and crosses the Hyco River. The U.S. Highway passes through Cluster Springs to the community of Riverdale just south of South Boston. US 501 becomes an undivided highway and intersects US 58 and US 360, which together head west as Philpott Road and east as Bill Tuck Highway. US 501 crosses the Dan River into the town of South Boston. Just north of the river, the highway has a grade crossing of Norfolk Southern Railway's Clover Spur, which follows the former Danville–Richmond rail line, and splits into a one-way pair: Broad Street northbound and Main Street southbound. Both directions intersect SR 304 (Seymour Drive). When Main Street veers northeast as two-way SR 129, southbound US 501 continues on two-way Wilborn Avenue to the northern end of the one-way pair.

US 501 continues through South Boston on Wilborn Avenue, a five-lane road with center turn lane. The U.S. Highway becomes four-lane divided Halifax Road at Hamilton Boulevard. US 501 receives the northern end of SR 129 (Old Halifax Road) shortly before leaving the town of South Boston. The U.S. Highway enters the town of Halifax and becomes Main Street, a three-lane road with center turn lane, at its grade crossing of Norfolk Southern's Durham District. US 501 continues to the county courthouse, where the highway intersects the very short SR 349 (Edmunds Boulevard) and SR 360 (Mountain Road), which runs concurrently with the U.S. Highway through the northern part of the town. The two highways diverge: SR 360 heads northeast as Bethel Road and US 501 heads northwest as two-lane L.P. Bailey Memorial Highway. which crosses Banister Lake, an impoundment of the Banister River, as it leaves the town of Halifax.

US 501 passes through Volens and Acorn on its way to the hamlet of North Halifax, where the highway begins to run concurrently with SR 40 (Stage Coach Road). The highways cross the Roanoke River into the town of Brookneal in Campbell County and pass under Norfolk Southern's Altavista District rail line. The highways continue as Lusardi Drive to Lynchburg Avenue in the center of town; SR 40 turns southeast while US 501 turns north west onto the street just north of the highways' grade crossing of the Durham District rail line. US 501 leaves the town as Brookneal Highway, which parallels the rail line through the communities of Naruna and Gladys on its way to Rustburg, the county seat of Campbell County. The U.S. Highway intersects SR 24 (Colonial Highway) at the southern edge of the village. The highways have a short concurrency before SR 24 continues east as Village Highway and US 501 heads northwest as Campbell Highway. North of Rustburg, US 501 expands to a four-lane divided highway into the independent city of Lynchburg, where the highway meets US 29 and US 460 (Richmond Highway) at a partial cloverleaf interchange. US 501 Business and US 460 Business head straight on Campbell Avenue while US 501 joins the freeway heading southwest.

==== Lynchburg to Buena Vista ====
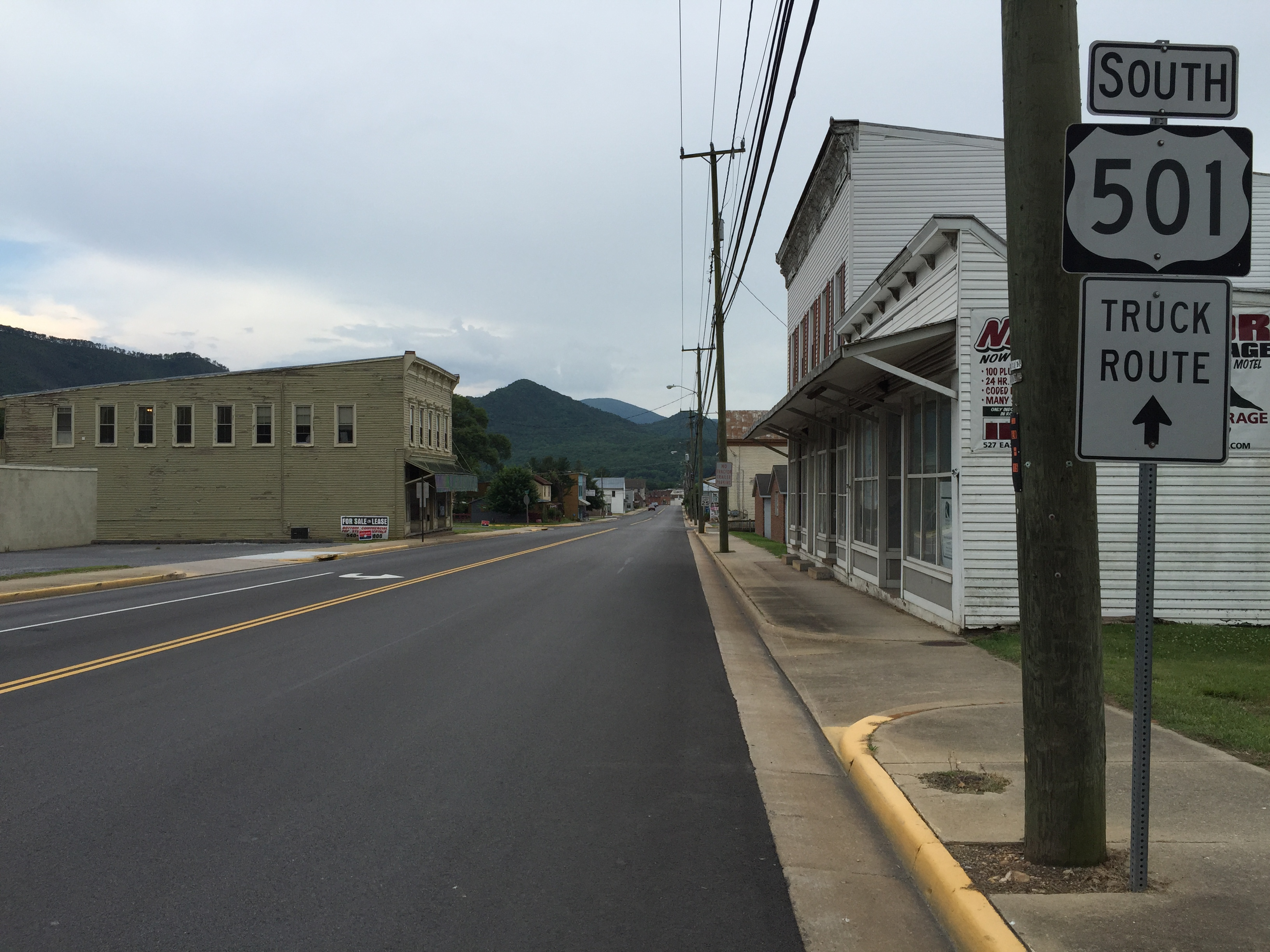
View south along US 501 just south of US 60 in Buena Vista

US 501 runs concurrently with US 29 and US 460 southwest along the northern slope of Candlers Mountain to a full Y interchange where US 501 heads northwest from the freeway. The U.S. Highway has an intersection with SR 128 (Mayflower Drive) and Candlers Mountain Road just east of the highway's crossing of Norfolk Southern's Danville District. SR 128 joins US 501 on Candlers Mountain Road between the intersection and the highway's cloverleaf interchange with US 29 Business (Lynchburg Expressway). US 501 exits onto the expressway while SR 128 continues west to its terminus. US 501 and US 29 Business head southwest along the freeway until the business route exits onto Wards Road to head toward Danville. US 501 curves northwest and has a cloverleaf interchange with US 460 Business (Timberlake Road), crosses Norfolk Southern's Blue Ridge District, and has a diamond interchange with Graves Mill Road. The freeway ends at US 221 (Lakeside Drive). US 501 heads north along Old Forest Road as a five-lane road with center turn lane before turning onto a two-lane segment of the Lynchburg Expressway. This segment has a partial cloverleaf interchange with Wiggington Road before ending at US 501 Business (Boonsboro Road).

US 501 heads northwest on two-lane Boonsboro Road, which becomes Lee Jackson Highway when it exits the city of Lynchburg into Bedford County. The U.S. Highway curvaceously crosses Fleming Mountain and descends into the James River Gorge at Coleman Falls. US 501 follows the south bank of the river through Big Island, where the highway meets the northern end of SR 122 (Big Island Highway) and has an interchange with the Blue Ridge Parkway. North of Big Island, the U.S. Highway crosses the river and immediately intersects SR 130 (Elon Road) on the Amherst County side. The two highways have a curvaceous crossing of the spine of the Blue Ridge Mountains before descending to the town of Glasgow at the mouth of the Maury River. The two routes follow the river upstream a short distance before SR 130 (Wert Faulkner Highway) crosses the river into the town. US 501, now named Glasgow Highway, parallels the river and Norfolk Southern's Roanoke District rail line north to the city of Buena Vista, which the highway enters as Magnolia Avenue. South of the downtown area, US 501 veers onto Sycamore Street while US 501 Business continues along Magnolia Avenue. At 22nd Street, the U.S. Highway veers onto Beech Avenue, which receives the northern end of US 501 Business (Park Avenue) west of Southern Virginia University. Two blocks to the north, US 501 reaches its northern terminus at US 60 (29th Street).

== History ==
=== South Carolina ===
Established in 1935 as an extension from North Carolina. US 501 replaced part of US 117 between Myrtle Beach and Socastee, then from there through Conway, Marion, and Latta on what was SC 38. North of Latta, it overlapped with US 301, through Dillon, and into North Carolina.

During the 1940s, because of the need for a more direct route to Myrtle Beach Air Force Base from Conway, 2-lane US 501 was built through the Buist Tract owned by Southern Kraft Company (later part of International Paper), replacing SC 503, its old alignment was renumbered to SC 544. In 1950, US 501 was moved onto new construction between Conway and Aynor, its old alignment renumbered to SC 319. By 1964, US 501 was moved to its current southern bypass from downtown Conway, creating US 501 Bus. By 1990, US 501 was moved to its current eastern bypass from downtown Marion, creating another US 501 Bus.

In 2021, the South Carolina Department of Transportation and Horry County announced plans to spend tens of millions of dollars expanding U.S. 501 into four lanes each way near Myrtle Beach.

=== North Carolina ===
When US 501 was established in 1927, it was aligned along North Carolina Highway 13 (NC 13) from Durham north through Roxboro to the Virginia state line.

In 1934, it was overlapped with US 15 from Durham south to Laurinburg. From there, it went southeast to Rowland and then to the South Carolina border. This extension south replaced NC 22, NC 71, and NC 241.

In 1953, US 501 was bypassed around Chapel Hill. In 1956 or 1957, US 501 was bypassed west of Sanford. Between 1960 and 1962, US 501 was bypassed around Laurinburg.

In 2023, AASHTO approved a request to reroute US 501 in Pittsboro; continuing its overlap with NC 87 and then onto US 64, with its old alignment through the downtown area downgraded to secondary roads. In May 2025, NCDOT completed the route change.

==== North Carolina Highway 13 (1921-1930) ====
North Carolina Highway 13
- Location: Durham–Virginia state line
- Length: 43 mi (69 km)
- Existed: 1921–1930

North Carolina Highway 13 was an original state highway running from Durham, north through Rougemont and Roxboro ending at SR 18 at the Virginia State Line. The highway's routing appeared on the 1916 Highway Map by the North Carolina State Highway Commission for the five year federal aid program. However NC 13 was not officially marked on any state highway maps until 1924; where it was routed from NC 10/NC 75 in Durham north through Rougemont and Timberlake to NC 57 east of Roxboro. NC 13 turned toward the west into Roxboro, before intersecting NC 144 and turning north. The highway had its northern terminus at the Virginia State Line near South Boston. By 1926 the routing of NC 13 was shifted slightly to the west between Timberlake and Roxboro, providing a direct link between the cities. The route was deleted in 1930, with US 501/NC 55 taking over the entirety of the routing.

Browse numbered routes
← US 13	→ NC 14

== Major intersections ==
State	County	Location	mi	km	Exit	Destinations	Notes
South Carolina	Horry	Myrtle Beach	0.00	0.00		US 17 Bus. (Kings Highway)	Southern terminus
South Carolina	Horry	Myrtle Beach	1.3	2.1		Robert M. Grissom Parkway	To Myrtle Beach International Airport
South Carolina	Horry	Myrtle Beach	2.1	3.4		US 17 – North Myrtle Beach, Georgetown	Cloverleaf interchange
South Carolina	Horry	Atlantic Intracoastal Waterway				South end of freeway	
South Carolina	Horry	Carolina Forest			—	River Oaks Drive / George Bishop Parkway	To Myrtle Beach International Airport
South Carolina	Horry	Forestbrook			—	Dick Scobee Road / Forestbrook Road	
South Carolina	Horry	Forestbrook	5.1	8.2	—	SC 31 – North Myrtle Beach, Georgetown	Hybrid interchange; north end of freeway
South Carolina	Horry	Conway–Red Hill line	10.9	17.5		US 501 Bus. north to SC 90 / SC 905 – Conway	Southern terminus of US 501 Bus.
South Carolina	Horry	Red Hill	11.3	18.2		SC 544 – Socastee, Surfside Beach, Garden City, Murrells Inlet	No access from US 501 to SC 544, from SC 544 east to US 501 north, or from SC 544 west to US 501 south
South Carolina	Horry	Red Hill				US 378 Truck north / US 701 Truck north / SC 90 Truck east / SC 544 Conn. to SC 90 / SC 544 – Surfside Beach, Garden City Beach, Murrells Inlet	Southern end of US 378 Truck/US 701 Truck/SC 90 Truck concurrency
South Carolina	Horry	Conway	14.3	23.0		US 378 (Wright Boulevard) / US 701 south (Church Street) to SC 905 – Lake City, Georgetown	Northern end of US 378 Truck/US 701 Truck/SC 90 Truck concurrency; southern end of US 701 concurrency
South Carolina	Horry	Conway	15.3	24.6		US 701 north / US 501 Bus. south (16th Avenue) – Loris	Northern end of US 701 concurrency; southern end of US 701 Truck concurrency
South Carolina	Horry	Conway				US 701 Truck north (Mill Pond Road)	Northern end of US 701 Truck concurrency
South Carolina	Horry		22.6	36.4		SC 22 east (Veterans Highway) – Myrtle Beach, North Myrtle Beach	Interchange; western terminus of SC 22
South Carolina	Horry					Horry Road / Brunson Spring Road	Interchange via connector roads
South Carolina	Horry	Aynor	29.2	47.0		SC 319 south (Elm Street)	Northern terminus of SC 319
South Carolina	Marion	Ariel Crossroad	37.2	59.9		SC 41 – Mullins, Johnsonville	Interchange
South Carolina	Marion		43.7	70.3		US 501 Bus. north to I-20 west / US 76 west – Marion, Florence	Interchange
South Carolina	Marion	Marion	47.7	76.8		US 76 – Marion, Mullins	Interchange
South Carolina	Marion		49.6	79.8		SC 41 Alt. – Marion, Lake View	Interchange
South Carolina	Marion	Spring Branch	52.0	83.7		US 501 Bus. south – Marion	Interchange
South Carolina	Marion		56.6	91.1		SC 38 west to I-95 – Bennettsville	Interchange; southern terminus of SC 38
South Carolina	Dillon					I-73	Proposed interchange
South Carolina	Dillon	Latta	59.8	96.2		US 301 south – Florence	South end of US 301 overlap
South Carolina	Dillon	Latta	60.3	97.0		SC 917 south (Main Street) – Mullins, Bennettsville	
South Carolina	Dillon	Dillon	66.8	107.5		SC 9 south / SC 34 west / SC 57 south (Main Street) – Lake View, North Myrtle Beach	South end of SC 9/SC 57 overlap; Eastern terminus of SC 34
South Carolina	Dillon	Dillon	67.8	109.1		SC 9 north / SC 57 north (Radford Boulevard) – Bennettsville, Charlotte	North end of SC 9/SC 57 overlap
South Carolina–North Carolina line			73.8 0.00	118.8 0.00		I-95 – Lumberton, Fayetteville, Florence	I-95 exit 1
North Carolina	Robeson	Rowland	2.7	4.3		US 301 north / NC 130 east – Lumberton, Fairmont	North end of US 301 and east end of NC 130 overlap
North Carolina	Robeson		4.0	6.4		NC 710 west – Pembroke	
North Carolina	Robeson	Raemon	10.2	16.4		NC 130 west – Maxton	West end of NC 130 overlap
North Carolina	Robeson		14.0	22.5		NC 83 – Maxton, Clio	
North Carolina	Scotland	Laurinburg	21.0	33.8		US 501 Bus. north (Johns Road)	
North Carolina	Scotland	Laurinburg	21.7	34.9		US 74 east (I-74 east)	East end of I-74/US 74 overlap; I-74 exit 185
North Carolina	Scotland	Laurinburg			184	US 15 Bus. / US 401 Bus. – Laurinburg	Exit number follows I-74
North Carolina	Scotland	Laurinburg	23.2	37.3		US 74 west (I-74 west) / US 15 / US 401 south – Rockingham, Bennettsville	North end of I-74/US 74 overlap; I-74 exit 183; south end of US 15/US 401 overlap
North Carolina	Scotland	Laurinburg	24.2	38.9		US 74 Bus. (Church Street) – Hamlet	
North Carolina	Scotland	Laurinburg	26.1	42.0		US 401 north / US 15 Bus. south / US 501 Bus. south – Fayetteville	North end of US 401 overlap
North Carolina	Scotland		29.3	47.2		NC 144 (Old Wire Road) – Wagram	
North Carolina	Drowning Creek					Scotland-Hoke county line	
North Carolina	Moore	Aberdeen	49.1	79.0		NC 211 east – Raeford	East end of NC 211 overlap
North Carolina	Moore	Aberdeen	49.5	79.7		US 1 south – Rockingham	South end of US 1 overlap
North Carolina	Moore	Aberdeen	49.7	80.0		NC 5 – Pinehurst	
North Carolina	Moore	Aberdeen	51.4	82.7		US 1 north – Southern Pines	North end of US 1 overlap
North Carolina	Moore	Pinehurst	55.2	88.8		NC 2 / NC 211 west – Southern Pines, West End	Roundabout, west end of NC 211 overlap
North Carolina	Moore		59.0	95.0		NC 73 west – West End	
North Carolina	Moore	Carthage	62.5	100.6		NC 22 south – Southern Pines	South end of NC 22 overlap
North Carolina	Moore	Carthage	63.6	102.4		NC 22 north (McNiell Street)	North end of NC 22 overlap
North Carolina	Moore	Carthage	65.7	105.7		NC 24 east / NC 27 east (Monroe Street)	East end of NC 24/NC 27 overlap
North Carolina	Moore		67.5	108.6		NC 24 east / NC 27 east – Cameron	West end of NC 24/NC 27 overlap
North Carolina	Lee		76.0	122.3		US 1 south – Cameron, Southern Pines	South end of US 1 overlap
North Carolina	Lee	Tramway	78.6	126.5		NC 78 east (Tramway Road) – Cameron	
North Carolina	Lee	Sanford	81.0	130.4	66	US 1 Bus. north / NC 42 – Asheboro, Fuquay-Varina	South end of freeway; exit numbers follow US 1
North Carolina	Lee	Sanford	82.3	132.4	68	Spring Lane	
North Carolina	Lee	Sanford	82.8	133.3	69A	NC 87 / US 421 Bus. – Olivia, Pineview, Spout Springs	South end of NC 87 overlap
North Carolina	Lee	Sanford	83.5	134.4	69B	Burns Drive	
North Carolina	Lee	Sanford	84.0	135.2	70	US 421 – Fuquay-Varina, Dunn, Greensboro	
North Carolina	Lee	Sanford	87.5	140.8		US 1 north (Claude E. Pope Memorial Highway north) / US 1 Bus. south – Sanford	Roundabout interchange; north end of freeway section; northern end of US 1 concurrency; US 1 exit 71
North Carolina	Deep River				Bridge		
North Carolina	Chatham	Pittsboro				NC 902 west – Bear Creek, Goldston	West end of NC 902 overlap
North Carolina	Chatham	Pittsboro				US 64 Bus. / NC 902 end	East end of NC 902 overlap
North Carolina	Chatham	Pittsboro			381	US 64 west / NC 87 north – Siler City, Burlington	West end of US 64 and North end of NC 87 overlap
North Carolina	Chatham	Pittsboro			383	US 64 east – Raleigh	East end of US 64 overlap
North Carolina	Orange	Chapel Hill	115.0	185.1		NC 54 west – Graham	South end of NC 54 overlap
North Carolina	Orange	Chapel Hill	117.2	188.6		NC 54 east (Raleigh Road)	North end of NC 54 overlap
North Carolina	Orange	Chapel Hill	119.2	191.8		Franklin Street	Interchange; southbound exit and northbound entrance
North Carolina	Durham	Durham	121.0	194.7		I-40 – Greensboro, Raleigh	
North Carolina	Durham	Durham	123.0	197.9	105A-B	US 15 Bus. / US 501 Bus. (Chapel Hill Boulevard) / Martin Luther King Jr. Parkway – South Square	South end of freeway; signed as exit 105A (US 15 Bus./US 501 Bus.) and 105B (MLK Pkwy.)
North Carolina	Durham	Durham	124.5	200.4	106	Cornwallis Road	
North Carolina	Durham	Durham	125.5	202.0	107	NC 751 (Cameron Boulevard)	
North Carolina	Durham	Durham	126.2	203.1	108A	Morreene Road	Southbound exit and northbound entrance ramps use C/D lanes
North Carolina	Durham	Durham	126.2	203.1	108B-C	NC 147 (Durham Freeway) to I-85 south / US 70 west	Access via C/D lanes; signed as exits 108B (south) and 108C (north)
North Carolina	Durham	Durham	126.2	203.1	108D	US 70 Bus. (Hillsborough Road)	Northbound exit and southbound entrance ramps use C/D lanes
North Carolina	Durham	Durham	127.4	205.0	—	I-85 south / US 70 west – Burlington, Greensboro	Southern end of I-85 / US 70 concurrency; I-85 exit 174A; southbound left exit and northbound left entrance
North Carolina	Durham	Durham			174B	Hillandale Road	Exit numbers follow I-85
North Carolina	Durham	Durham			175	NC 157 (Guess Road)	To NC School of Science & Math and Duke Homestead
North Carolina	Durham	Durham	130.0	209.2	—	I-85 / US 15 north / US 70 east – Oxford	North end of I-85/US 15/US 70 overlap; I-85 exit 176
North Carolina	Durham	Durham	130.0	209.2	176A	Gregson Street – Northgate	North end of freeway; no exit number southbound
North Carolina	Durham	Durham	132.58	213.37		US 501 Bus. (Roxboro Street)	
North Carolina	Person		146.0	235.0		NC 57 south – Hillsborough	South end of NC 57 overlap
North Carolina	Person	Roxboro	156.5	251.9		US 158 east – Oxford	East end of US 158 overlap
North Carolina	Person	Roxboro	157.0	252.7		NC 157 south – Durham	
North Carolina	Person	Roxboro	158.0	254.3		US 158 west / NC 49 south / NC 57 north – Yanceyville, Milton, Haw River	West end of US 158, south end of NC 49, and north end of NC 57 overlap
North Carolina	Person	Roxboro	159.0	255.9		NC 49 north (Virgilina Road) – Virgilina	North end of NC 49 overlap
			170.0 0.00	273.6 0.00		North Carolina–Virginia line	
Virginia	Halifax		2.46	3.96		SR 96 east (Virgilina Road) – Virgilina	
Virginia	Halifax	Riverdale	10.94	17.61		US 58 / US 360 / US 501 Truck north (Bill Tuck Highway) – Danville, Clarksville, Richmond, South Hill	
Virginia	Halifax	South Boston	11.56	18.60		SR 304 east (Seymour Drive)	
Virginia	Halifax	South Boston	11.78	18.96		SR 129 north (North Main Street)	
Virginia	Halifax	South Boston				US 501 Truck south (Hamilton Boulevard)	
Virginia	Halifax	South Boston	14.62	23.53		SR 129 south (Old Halifax Road) / SR 884 west (Powell Road) – South Boston	
Virginia	Halifax	Halifax	16.92	27.23		SR 360 west (Mountain Road)	South end of concurrency with SR 360
Virginia	Halifax	Halifax	17.70	28.49		SR 360 east (Bethel Road) – Crystal Hill, Richmond	North end of concurrency with SR 360
Virginia	Halifax	Volens				SR 603 (Cody Road) – Republican Grove, Cody	Former SR 126 north
Virginia	Halifax	North Halifax	38.25	61.56		SR 40 west (Stage Coach Road) / SR 632 east (Hog Wallow Road) – Gretna	South end of concurrency with SR 40
Virginia	Campbell	Brookneal	40.07	64.49		SR 40 east (Lynchburg Avenue) – Charlotte CH, Patrick Henry Boys Home	North end of concurrency with SR 40
Virginia	Campbell	Gladys				SR 652 (Pigeon Run Road) / SR 761 (Long Island Road) – Long Island, Altavista	Former SR 126 south
Virginia	Campbell	Rustburg	59.59	95.90		SR 24 west (Colonial Highway) to US 29 – Roanoke	South end of concurrency with SR 24
Virginia	Campbell	Rustburg	60.51	97.38		SR 24 east (Village Highway) – Concord	North end of concurrency with SR 24
Virginia	City of Lynchburg		68.47	110.19		US 29 north / US 460 east / US 460 Bus. west / US 501 Bus. north (Campbell Avenue) – Charlottesville, Appomattox, Washington	South end of freeway section; east end of concurrency with US 29/US 460
Virginia	City of Lynchburg				—	Odd Fellows Road	
Virginia	City of Lynchburg		70.83	113.99		US 29 south / US 460 west – Roanoke, Danville	North end of freeway section; west end of concurrency with US 29/US 460
Virginia	City of Lynchburg		71.42	114.94		SR 128 east (Mayflower Drive) / SR 670 south (Candlers Mountain Road) – Liberty University	South end of concurrency with SR 128; partial interchange with SR 670
Virginia	City of Lynchburg		71.82	115.58		US 29 Bus. north (Lynchburg Expressway east) / SR 128 west (Candlers Mountain Road) – Charlottesville	North end of concurrency with SR 128; south end of concurrency with US 29 Bus.; south end of freeway section; Lynchburg Expwy. exit 8B
Virginia	City of Lynchburg		72.16	116.13	9	US 29 Bus. south – Danville	Exit numbers follow Lynchburg Expwy.; north end of concurrency with US 29 Bus.
Virginia	City of Lynchburg		73.67	118.56	10	US 460 Bus. (Timberlake Road / Fort Avenue)	Signed as exits 10A (east) and 10B (west)
Virginia	City of Lynchburg		74.88	120.51	11	Graves Mill Road	Former SR 126
Virginia	City of Lynchburg				—	To Breezewood Drive	Southbound exit and entrance only
Virginia	City of Lynchburg		76.12	122.50		US 221 (Lakeside Drive) – Thomas Jefferson's Poplar Forest, Lynchburg College	Intersection; north end of freeway section; west end of Lynchburg Expressway
Virginia	City of Lynchburg		77.66	124.98	—	Wiggington Road – Peaks View Park	Folded diamond interchange
Virginia	City of Lynchburg		79.52	127.98		US 501 Bus. south (Boonsboro Road)	
Virginia	Bedford	Big Island	91.28	146.90		SR 122 south (Big Island Highway) – Bedford	
Virginia	Bedford				—	Blue Ridge Parkway	One-quadrant interchange
Virginia	Amherst		95.75	154.09		SR 130 east (Elon Road) – Lynchburg	South end of concurrency with SR 130
Virginia	Rockbridge		102.12	164.35		SR 130 west (Wert Faulkner Highway) – Glasgow, Natural Bridge	North end of concurrency with SR 130
Virginia	City of Buena Vista		110.52	177.86		US 501 Bus. north (Magnolia Avenue)	
Virginia	City of Buena Vista		111.30	179.12		US 501 Bus. south (Park Avenue)	
Virginia	City of Buena Vista		111.42	179.31		US 60 to I-81	Northern terminus; road continues as Rockbridge Avenue
1.000 mi = 1.609 km; 1.000 km = 0.621 mi: Concurrency terminus; Incomplete access; Unopened

== See also ==
- Special routes of U.S. Route 501
