= U.S. Route 15 in North Carolina =

Highway in North Carolina

U.S. Highway 15
- US 15 highlighted in red

Route information
- Maintained by NCDOT
- Length: 159 mi (256 km)
- Existed: 1926–present

Major junctions
- South end: US 15 / US 401 at the South Carolina state line near McColl, SC
- I-74 / US 74 in Laurinburg; US 421 in Sanford; I-40 in Durham; NC 147 in Durham; I-85 / I-885 / US 70 in Durham
- North end: US 15 at the Virginia state line near Clarksville, VA

Location
- Country: United States
- State: North Carolina
- Counties: Scotland, Hoke, Moore, Lee, Chatham, Orange, Durham, Granville

Highway system
- United States Numbered Highway System; List; Special; Divided; North Carolina Highway System; Interstate; US; State; Scenic
← NC 14	→ NC 16

U.S. Highway 15 (US 15) is a north–south United States Numbered Highway running from Walterboro, South Carolina, to Painted Post, New York. In the U.S. state of North Carolina, the highway runs for 159 miles (256 km) from the South Carolina state line to the south of Laurinburg to the Virginia state line north of Bullock. US 15 travels in concurrency with US 501 for 106 miles (171 km) between Laurinburg and Durham.

== Route description ==
US 15 northbound concurrent with US 401 and US 501 in Laurinburg

From the South Carolina state line, US 15 is in concurrency with US 401 to Laurinburg. Merging with US 501, it becomes what is known as "15-501" ("Fifteen Five-o-one"), a concurrency that extends for 106 miles (171 km) across central North Carolina; US 15 also the dominant partner, using its milemarkers along the route. After Laurinburg, it goes north to Aberdeen, linking briefly with US 1 before continuing to Pinehurst. In Pinehurst, US 15/US 501 goes through a roundabout, then continues north, through Carthage, back to US 1. After another brief concurrency with US 1 through Sanford, it exits off the freeway and goes due north to Pittsboro. After Pittsboro, US 15/US 501 becomes an expressway, connecting the cities of Chapel Hill and Durham; this section of the route is famous because of the two universities it connects: University of North Carolina at Chapel Hill and Duke University. Though the road is a symbol of the separation of the Carolina–Duke rivalry, the North Carolina Department of Transportation has been trying to remedy that by making the route a superstreet for better traffic flow. In Durham, US 15/US 501 upgrades to an urban freeway, allowing for quick access from south Durham to north; the freeway ends merging into Interstate 85 (I-85). At exit 176B (on I-85), US 501 splits off toward Roxboro, while US 15 continues with I-85 toward Oxford.

After Durham, US 15 continues to follow I-85 till exit 186A, where it goes first to Creedmoor, then on into Oxford. After going through downtown Oxford, it continues north, near Mayo Lake, to Clarksville, Virginia.

== History ==
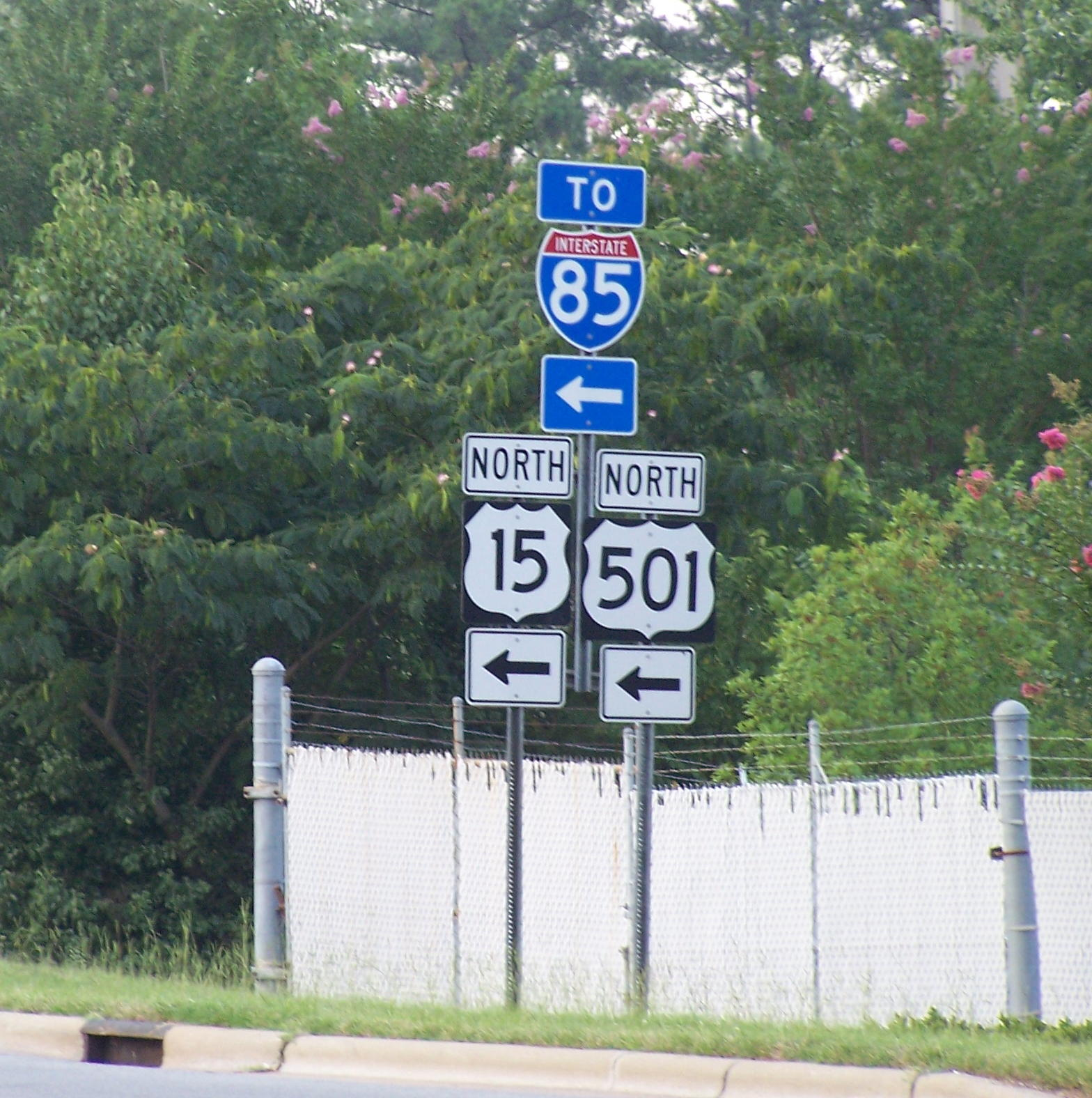
US 15/US 501 entrance in Durham

Established in 1927, it was aligned along North Carolina Highway 75 from the South Carolina state line, through Rockingham, Pinehurst, and Durham, to the Virginia state line.

In 2023, AASHTO approved a request to reroute US 15 in Pittsboro; continuing its overlap with NC 87 and then onto US 64, with its old alignment through the downtown area downgraded to secondary roads. In May 2025, NCDOT completed the route change.

== Junction list ==
County	Location	mi	km	Exit	Destinations	Notes
Scotland		0.00	0.00		US 15 south / US 401 south – Bennettsville	Continuation into South Carolina
Scotland	Laurinburg	5.0	8.0		US 15 Bus. / US 401 Bus.	
Scotland	Laurinburg	6.0	9.7		US 501 south / US 74 (I-74) – Rockingham, Lumberton, Myrtle Beach	Southern end of US 501 concurrency; I-74 exit 183
Scotland	Laurinburg	7.0	11.3		US 74 Bus. (Church Street)	
Scotland	Laurinburg	9.0	14.5		US 401 / US 15 Bus. / US 501 Bus. – Fayetteville	Northern end of US 401 concurrency
Scotland		12.0	19.3		NC 144 (Old Wire Road) – Wagram, Laurel Hill	
Drowning Creek					Scotland-Hoke county line	
Moore	Aberdeen	31.8	51.2		NC 211 – Raeford	Southern end of NC 211 concurrency
Moore	Aberdeen	32.0	51.5		US 1 – Rockingham	Southern end of US 1 concurrency
Moore	Aberdeen	32.2	51.8		NC 5 – Pinehurst	
Moore	Aberdeen	34.0	54.7		US 1 – Southern Pines	Northern end of US 1 concurrency
Moore	Pinehurst	38.0	61.2		NC 2 / NC 211 – Southern Pines, West End	Roundabout; northern end of NC 211 concurrency
Moore		41.5	66.8		NC 73 – West End	
Moore	Carthage	45.0	72.4		NC 22 – Southern Pines	Southern end of NC 22 concurrency
Moore	Carthage	46.0	74.0		NC 22 (McNeill Street)	Northern end of NC 22 concurrency
Moore	Carthage	48.0	77.2		NC 24 / NC 27 (Monroe Street)	Southern end of NC 24 / NC 27 concurrency
Moore		50.0	80.5		NC 24 / NC 27 – Cameron	Northern end of NC 24 / NC 27 concurrency
Lee		59.0	95.0		US 1 – Cameron, Southern Pines	Southern end of US 1 concurrency
Lee	Tramway	61.0	98.2		NC 78 (Tramway Road) – Cameron	
Lee	Sanford	63.5	102.2	66	NC 42 / US 1 Bus. – Asheboro, Fuquay-Varina	South end of freeway; exit numbers follow US 1
Lee	Sanford	65.0	104.6	68	Spring Lane	
Lee	Sanford	65.5	105.4	69A	NC 87 / US 421 Bus. – Olivia, Pineview, Spout Springs	Southern end of NC 87 concurrency
Lee	Sanford	66.0	106.2	69B	Burns Drive / Canterbury Road	
Lee	Sanford	66.5	107.0	70	US 421 – Fuquay-Varina, Dunn, Greensboro	
Lee	Sanford	67.5	108.6		US 1 north (Claude E. Pope Memorial Highway north) / US 1 Bus. south – Sanford	Roundabout interchange; north end of freeway section; northern end of US 1 concurrency; US 1 exit 71
Deep River				Bridge		
Chatham	Pittsboro				NC 902 west – Bear Creek, Goldston	Western end of NC 902 concurrency
Chatham	Pittsboro				US 64 Bus. / NC 902 ends	Eastern end of NC 902 concurrency
Chatham	Pittsboro			381	US 64 west / NC 87 north – Siler City, Burlington	Western end of US 64 and northern end of NC 87 concurrency
Chatham	Pittsboro			383	US 64 east – Raleigh	Eastern end of US 64 concurrency
Orange	Chapel Hill	97.0	156.1		NC 54 west (Fordham Boulevard South west) / NC 86 north – Carrboro, UNC Chapel Hill	Interchange; southern end of NC 54 concurrency
Orange	Chapel Hill	99.0	159.3		NC 54 (Raleigh Road) – Raleigh, UNC Chapel Hill	Cloverleaf interchange; northern end of NC 54 concurrency
Orange	Chapel Hill	102.0	164.2		Franklin Street	Interchange; southbound exit and northbound entrance
Durham	Durham	103.0	165.8		I-40 – Greensboro, Raleigh	I-40 exit 270
Durham	Durham	105.0	169.0	105A-B	US 15 Bus. / US 501 Bus. (Chapel Hill Boulevard) / Martin Luther King Jr. Parkway – South Square	South end of freeway; signed as exit 105A (US 15 Bus./US 501 Bus.) and 105B (MLK Pkwy.)
Durham	Durham	106.0	170.6	106	Cornwallis Road	
Durham	Durham	107.0	172.2	107	NC 751 (Cameron Boulevard)	
Durham	Durham	108.0– 108.5	173.8– 174.6	108A	Morreene Road	Southbound exit and northbound entrance ramps use C/D lanes
Durham	Durham	108.0– 108.5	173.8– 174.6	108B-C	NC 147 (Durham Freeway) to I-85 south / US 70 west	Access via C/D lanes; signed as exits 108B (south) and 108C (north)
Durham	Durham	108.0– 108.5	173.8– 174.6	108D	US 70 Bus. (Hillsborough Road)	Northbound exit and southbound entrance ramps use C/D lanes
Durham	Durham	109.0	175.4	—	I-85 south / US 70 west – Burlington, Greensboro	Southern end of I-85 / US 70 concurrency; I-85 exit 174A; southbound left exit and northbound left entrance
Durham	Durham			174B	Hillandale Road	Exit numbers follow I-85
Durham	Durham			175	NC 157 (Guess Road)	To NC School of Science & Math and Duke Homestead
Durham	Durham	111.5	179.4	176	US 501 north (Duke Street) / Gregson Street – Northgate	North end of US 501 overlap; signed northbound as exits 176A (Gregson St.) and 176B (US 501)
Durham	Durham			177	US 15 Bus. south / US 501 Bus. (Roxboro Street) / NC 55 east (Avondale Drive)	To North Carolina Central University
Durham	Durham	112.5	181.1	178	I-885 south / US 70 east – RDU Airport, Raleigh	Northern end of US 70 concurrency; northern terminus of I-885; US 70 exit 285
Durham	Durham			179	East Club Boulevard	
Durham	Durham			180	Glenn School Road	
Durham	Gorman			182	Red Mill Road	
Durham	Gorman			183	Redwood Road	
Falls Lake				Bridge		
Granville		122.0	196.3		I-85 north – Petersburg	Northern end of I-85 concurrency; north end of freeway section; I-85 exit 186A
Granville	Creedmoor	127.0	204.4		NC 50 / NC 56 – Butner, Wilton, Franklinton	
Granville		139.0	223.7		I-85 – Durham, Petersburg	I-85 exit 202
Granville	Oxford	142.0	228.5		NC 96 (MLK Jr. Avenue) – Henderson	Southern end of NC 96 concurrency
Granville	Oxford	142.3	229.0		US 158 Bus. (Williamsboro Street)	Southern end of US 158 Bus. concurrency
Granville	Oxford	143.0	230.1		NC 96 (Roxboro Road) / US 158 Bus. – Roxboro	Northern terminus of NC 96 / US 158 Bus. concurrency
Granville	Oxford	144.0	231.7		US 158 (Oxford Loop Road) – Roxboro, Henderson	
Granville		159.0	255.9		US 15 north – Clarksville	Continuation into Virginia
1.000 mi = 1.609 km; 1.000 km = 0.621 mi: Concurrency terminus; Incomplete access

== See also ==
- Special routes of U.S. Route 15

U.S. Route 15
Previous state: South Carolina	North Carolina	Next state: Virginia
