= North Carolina Highway 751 =

State highway in North Carolina, US

North Carolina Highway 751

Route information
- Maintained by NCDOT
- Length: 23.8 mi (38.3 km)
- Existed: 1930–present

Major junctions
- South end: US 64 near Apex
- I-40 in Durham; US 15 / US 501 in Durham
- North end: US 70 Bus. near Durham

Location
- Country: United States
- State: North Carolina
- Counties: Chatham, Durham, Orange

Highway system
- North Carolina Highway System; Interstate; US; State; Scenic
← NC 742	→ NC 770

North Carolina Highway 751 (NC 751) is a north–south state road in North Carolina that runs from U.S. Route 64 (US 64) near Jordan Lake State Recreation Area, to US 70 Business near Durham. The road also continues south approximately 4.3 miles (6.9 km) to US 1 as New Hill-Olive Chapel Road (SR 1141). It runs largely parallel to NC 55, extending farther west towards Hillsborough which can be reached by continuing on US 70.

== Route description ==
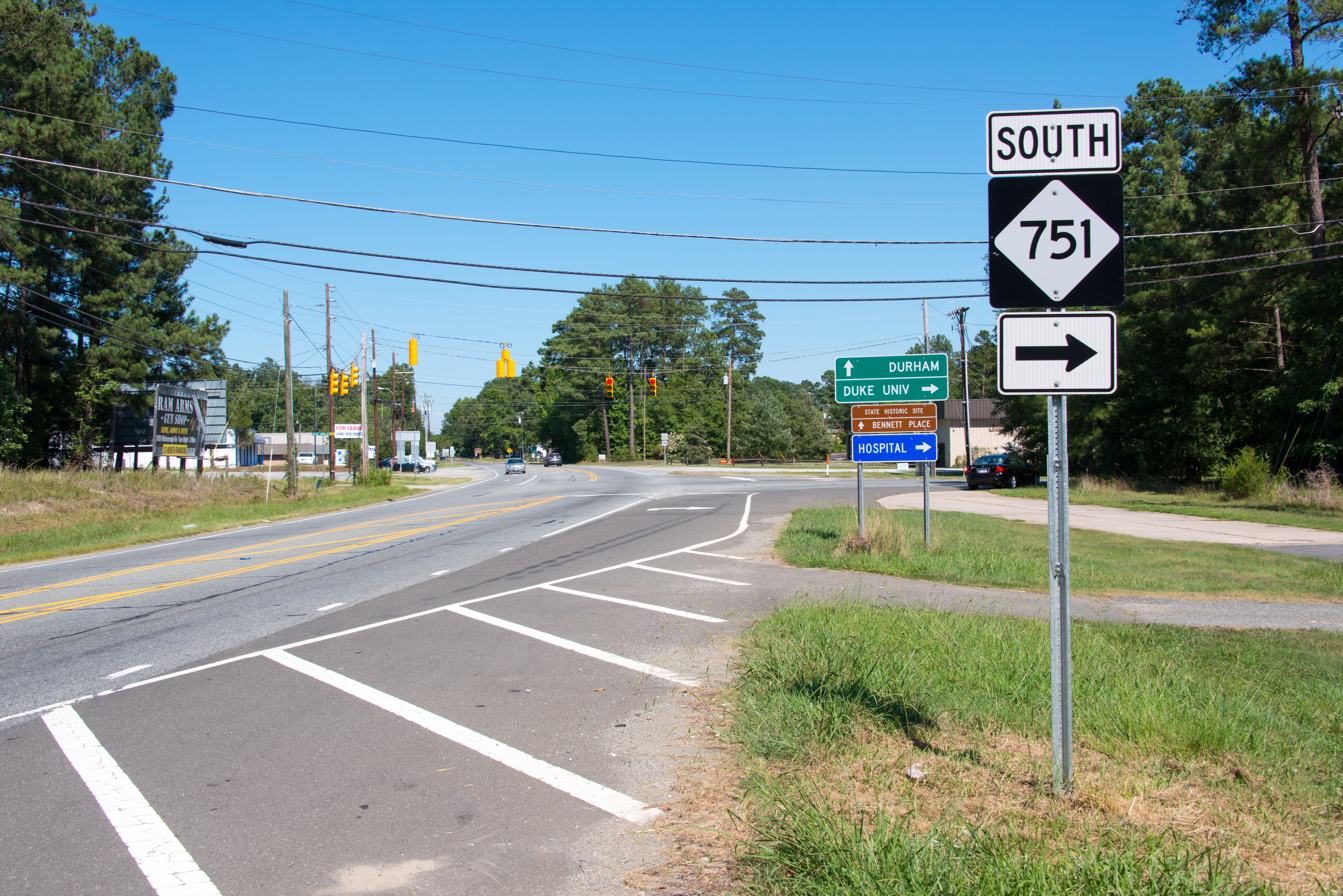
NC 751 at US 70 Bus.

NC 751 has its southern terminus in Chatham County, a short distance west of the Wake County line, at an intersection with US 64, about halfway between the town of Apex and the unincorporated community of Wilsonville. The route heads north, roughly paralleling the shores of Jordan Lake. The area is fairly rural, as most of the southernmost 12 miles (19 km) of the route goes through protected wilderness areas. Entering Durham County in the unincorporated community of Blands, it passes just to the west of the large shopping center called The Streets at Southpoint, and enters the city of Durham. After an interchange with I-40 (exit 274 on I-40), it crosses NC 54 and turns sharply northeast along Hope Valley Road. The road gradually bends back to the north, traversing a heavily residential area of South Durham. Reaching a small traffic circle at an intersection with University Drive, the route turns west on University Drive briefly, and then north along Academy Road. Next is an interchange with Business US 15-501 (Durham-Chapel Hill Boulevard), turning west onto Cameron Boulevard to pass south of the Duke University campus and north of the Duke Golf Club. Turning to the northwest, the route passes through Duke Forest, before coming to its northern terminus at Business US 70 (Hillsborough Road).

== History ==
NC 751 is a route formed early during the creation of the North Carolina route system. The original system established primary routes with two digit numbers and spurs with an extra digit at the end. NC 751 then was the first spur off of NC 75 which ran along the basic route of today's US 15 and was supplanted by it, and then also by US 501 in the late 1920s. NC 751's first routing took it from NC 75 (Old Chapel Hill Road in Durham) to NC 10, which is now US 70. In the 1950s with US 15-501 put onto a new route to the north, NC 751 was extended along Chapel Hill Street (now University Drive) and south along Hope Valley Road to NC 54. Later it was extended further south to US 64.

On May 4, 2023, the North Carolina State Board of Transportation voted to name three miles between Duke University Road and Kerley Road "Coach K Highway" for Duke basketball coach Mike Krzyzewski.

== Junction list ==
County	Location	mi	km	Destinations	Notes
Chatham		0.0	0.0	US 64 – Raleigh, Pittsboro	To Jordan Lake State Recreation Area
Durham	Durham	12.1	19.5	I-40 – Raleigh, Chapel Hill	
Durham	Durham	13.1	21.1	NC 54 – Raleigh, Chapel Hill	
Durham	Durham	18.2	29.3	US 15 Bus. / US 501 Bus. (Durham-Chapel Hill Boulevard) – Chapel Hill	
Durham	Durham	20.7	33.3	US 15 / US 501 – Roxboro, Oxford, Chapel Hill	
Orange		23.8	38.3	US 70 Bus. (Hillsborough Road)	To Bennett Place
1.000 mi = 1.609 km; 1.000 km = 0.621 mi

== Special routes ==
=== Durham truck route ===
North Carolina Highway 751 Truck
- Location: Durham, North Carolina
- Length: 3.0 mi (4.8 km)

North Carolina Highway 751 Truck (NC 751 Truck) is a bypass route for truck drivers that are traveling through the city of Durham. It travels along US 15 Bus./US 501 Bus. (Durham-Chapel Hill Boulevard) and US 15/US 501. Signage along the route only appears at key intersections.
