= Virginia State Route 128 =

State highway in the City of Lynchburg, Virginia, US

State Route 128

Route information
- Maintained by VDOT
- Length: 3.47 mi (5.58 km)
- Existed: 1933–present

Major junctions
- West end: SR 163 in Lynchburg
- US 501 / US 29 Bus. in Lynchburg
- East end: US 460 Bus. / US 501 Bus. in Lynchburg

Location
- Country: United States
- State: Virginia
- Counties: City of Lynchburg

Highway system
- Virginia Routes; Interstate; US; Primary; Secondary; Byways; History; HOT lanes
← SR 127	→ SR 129

State Route 128 (SR 128) is a primary state highway in the U.S. state of Virginia. Known for most of its length as Mayflower Drive, the state highway runs 3.47 miles (5.58 km) from SR 163 north to U.S. Route 460 Business (US 460 Business) and US 501 Business within the independent city of Lynchburg.

== Route description ==
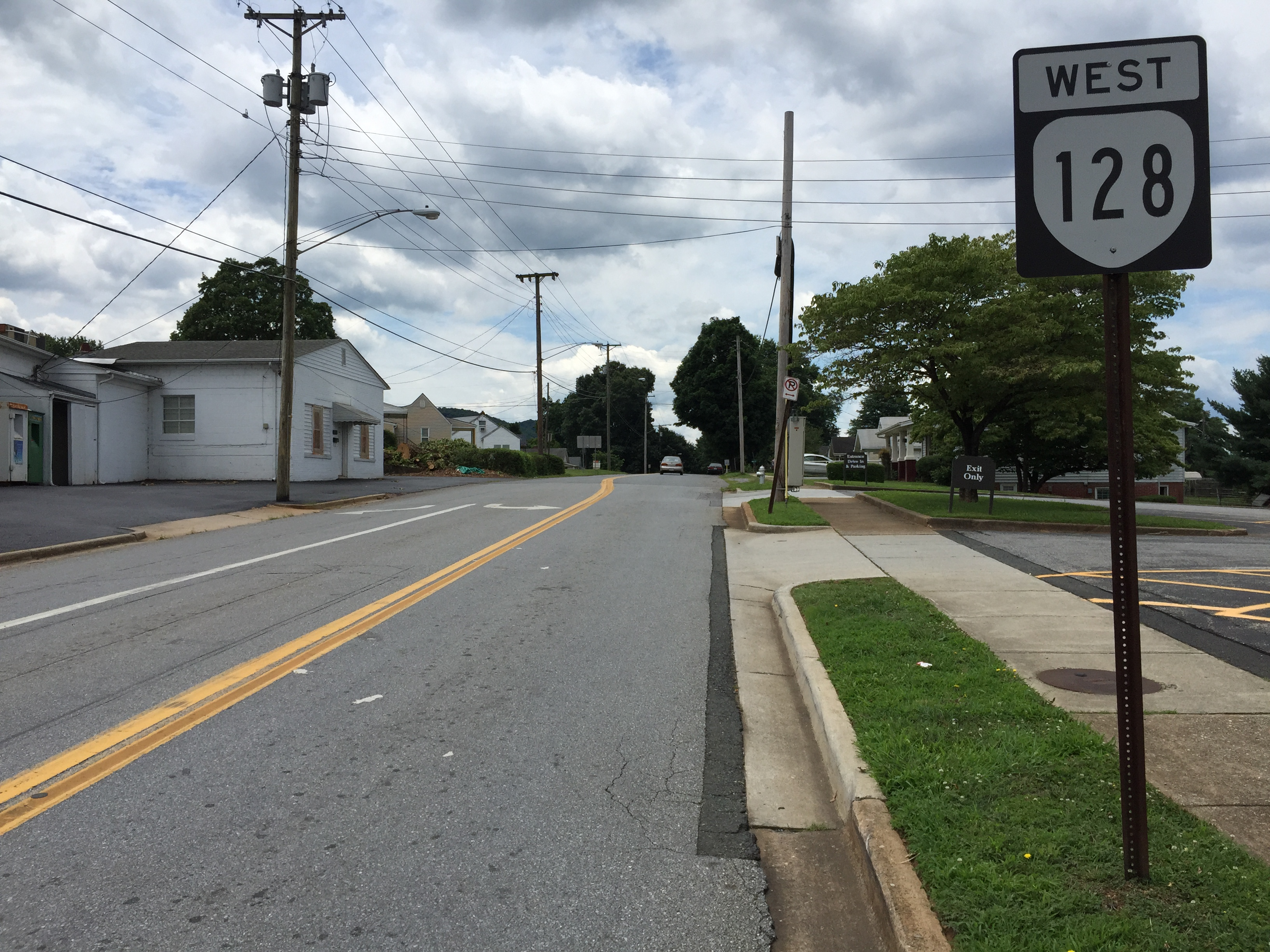
View west at the east end of SR 128 at US 460 Bus./US 501 Bus. in Lynchburg

SR 128 begins at an intersection with SR 163 (Wards Road). The state highway heads east as Candlers Mountain Road, a five-lane road with a center left-turn lane. The highway becomes a divided highway at its partial cloverleaf interchange with the Lynchburg Expressway, which carries US 29 Business north and south and US 501 to the south. There is no access from eastbound SR 128 to the southbound expressway; that movement is provided via SR 163. SR 128 and US 501 head east past the River Ridge Mall and across Norfolk Southern Railway's Danville District. Just east of the railroad, Candlers Mountain Road turns south toward Liberty University and US 501 continues east to join US 29 and US 460 on their freeway bypass of Lynchburg. SR 128 turns north onto two-lane undivided Mayflower Drive, which heads east through several industrial parks. North of Odd Fellows Road, the state highway veers east and then north again. For its at-grade intersection with Norfolk Southern Railway's Durham District rail line, SR 128 makes a sharp curve east, passes through a hairpin turn back west, in the middle of which the highway intersects the railroad, and curves north again. North of that railroad crossing, the state highway passes through a residential area and reaches its northern terminus at Campbell Avenue, which features US 460 Business and US 501 Business.

== Major intersections ==
The entire route is in Lynchburg.

mi	km	Destinations	Notes
0.00	0.00	SR 163 (Wards Road)	Western terminus
0.26	0.42	US 501 north / US 29 Bus. – Charlottesville, Danville, Buena Vista, Lynchburg Downtown Historic District	Partial cloverleaf interchange; west end of concurrency with US 501
0.69	1.11	US 501 south to US 29 / US 460 / Candlers Mountain Road – Appomattox, Liberty University	East end of concurrency with US 501
3.47	5.58	US 460 Bus. / US 501 Bus. (Campbell Avenue)	Eastern terminus
1.000 mi = 1.609 km; 1.000 km = 0.621 mi: Concurrency terminus

< SR 318	District 3 State Routes; 1928–1933	SR 320 >
