= North Carolina Highway 5 =

State highway in Moore County, North Carolina, US

North Carolina Highway 5

Route information
- Maintained by NCDOT
- Length: 8.30 mi (13.36 km)
- Existed: 1961–present

Major junctions
- South end: Bethesda Road in Aberdeen
- US 1 / US 15 / US 501 / NC 211 in Aberdeen
- North end: NC 211 in Pinehurst

Location
- Country: United States
- State: North Carolina
- Counties: Moore

Highway system
- North Carolina Highway System; Interstate; US; State; Scenic
← NC 4	→ NC 7

North Carolina Highway 5 (NC 5) is a primary state highway in the U.S. state of North Carolina. It runs entirely in Moore County and connects the Sandhills municipalities of Aberdeen and Pinehurst. It also serves as an alternate route for NC 211. NC 5's route was designated in 1961 and it has not changed since then.

== Route description ==
NC 5 starts at a three-way intersection at Malcolm Blue Farm and progresses through downtown Aberdeen, where it crosses US 1/US 15/US 501/NC 211/Sandhills Boulevard and continues northwest towards Pinehurst. It comes to its northern terminus at NC 211 at the Pinehurst/Taylortown city limits border.

All the NC 5 shields east of Sandhills Boulevard have no directional plates; this is because at NC 5's southern terminus, the route is heading in a northerly direction.

NC 5's central segment parallels a railroad owned by Norfolk Southern. Sand Pit Road between Aberdeen and Pinehurst splits from NC 5 and heads due south to the nearby town of Pinebluff.

== Nearby points of interest ==
- Pinehurst Harness Track, a horse racing track in Pinehurst
- The Pit Golf Links, a nationally popular golf course near Aberdeen
- Pinehurst Resort

== Major intersections ==
The entire route is in Moore County.

Location	mi	km	Destinations	Notes
Aberdeen	0.00	0.00	Bethesda Road (SR 2024) / E. L. Ives Road	
Aberdeen	1.51	2.43	US 15 / US 501 / NC 211	
Pinehurst	7.31	11.76	NC 2 east	Western terminus of NC 2
Pinehurst	8.30	13.36	NC 211	
1.000 mi = 1.609 km; 1.000 km = 0.621 mi

== See also ==
- North Carolina Highway 2, a similar route in the Sandhills region
