= Amelon =

Amelon may refer to:

- Virginia State Route 130, signed as Amelon Expressway in Madison Heights, Virginia
- Virginia State Route 669, signed as Amelon Road in Madison Heights, Virginia
