= Virginia State Route 129 =

State highway in Halifax County, Virginia, US

State Route 129

Route information
- Maintained by VDOT
- Length: 3.18 mi (5.12 km)
- Existed: 1933–present

Major junctions
- South end: US 501 in South Boston
- North end: US 501 / SR 884 at Centerville

Location
- Country: United States
- State: Virginia
- Counties: Halifax

Highway system
- Virginia Routes; Interstate; US; Primary; Secondary; Byways; History; HOT lanes
← SR 128	→ SR 130

State Route 129 (SR 129) is a primary state highway in the U.S. state of Virginia. The state highway runs 3.18 miles (5.12 km) from U.S. Route 501 (US 501) in South Boston north to US 501 at Centerville. SR 129 is the old alignment of US 501 and its predecessor, old SR 18, in central Halifax County.

== Route description ==
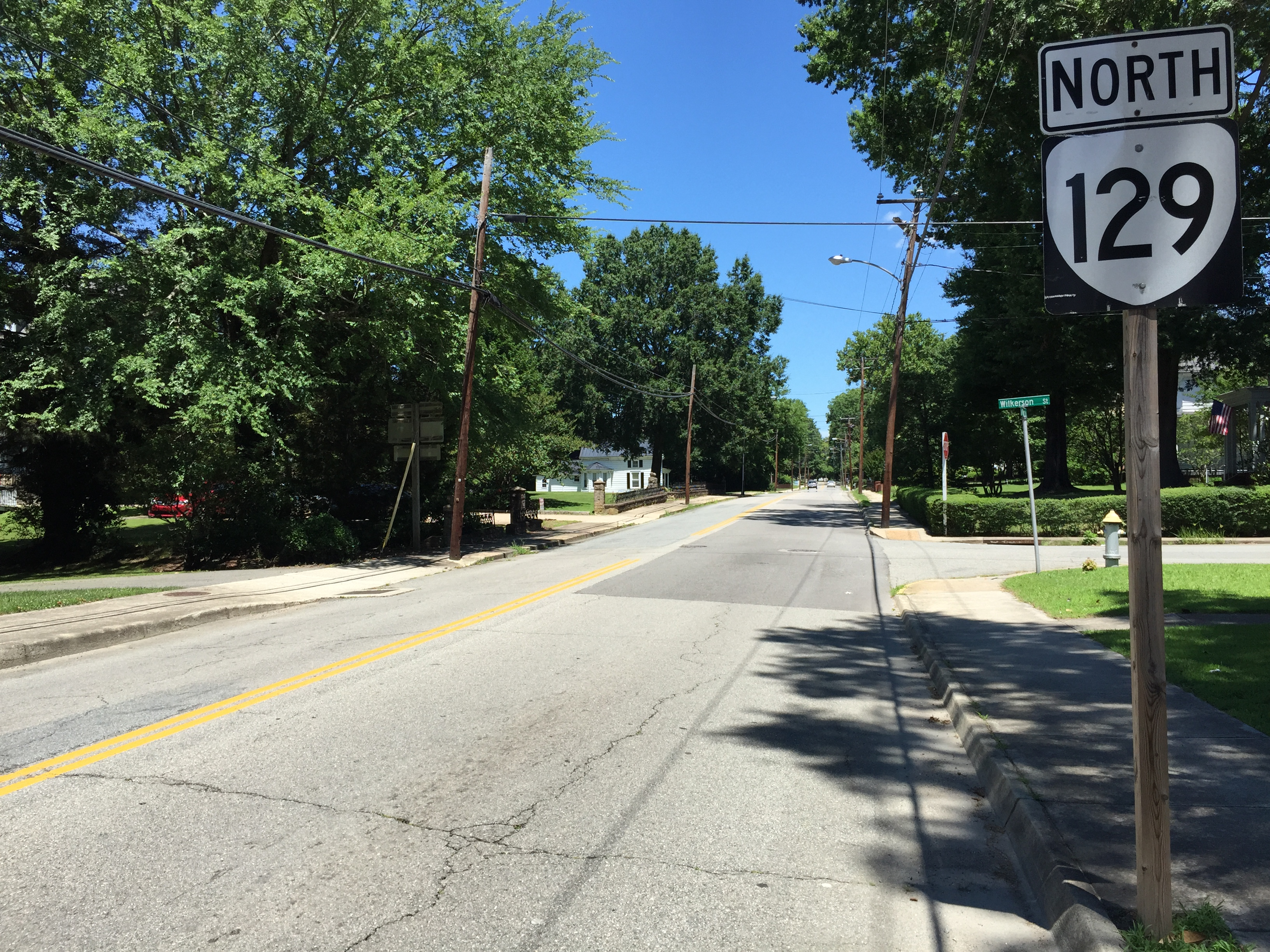
View north along SR 129 in South Boston

SR 129 begins in downtown South Boston at an intersection with southbound US 501, which comes from the northwest as two-way Wilborn Avenue and heads south as one-way Main Street. SR 129 heads northeast on Main Street, whose next intersection is with northbound US 501, which follows one-way Broad Street. The state highway curves northward and meets the west end of SR 34 (Hodges Street). SR 129 becomes Old Halifax Road shortly before making a westward curve to reach its northern terminus at US 501 (Halifax Road) in the hamlet of Centerville.

== Major intersections ==
The entire route is in Halifax County.

Location	mi	km	Destinations	Notes
South Boston	0.00	0.00	US 501 south (Main Street)	Southern terminus
South Boston	0.09	0.14	US 501 north (Broad Street)	
South Boston	0.47	0.76	SR 34 east (Hodges Street)	
South Boston			US 501 Truck (Hamilton Boulevard)	
South Boston (Centerville)	3.18	5.12	US 501 (Halifax Road) / SR 884 west (Powell Road) – South Boston, Halifax	Northern terminus
1.000 mi = 1.609 km; 1.000 km = 0.621 mi
