= Special routes of U.S. Route 701 =

Special routes of U.S. Route 701

Highway system
- United States Numbered Highway System; List; Special; Divided

Several special routes of U.S. Route 701 exist, from South Carolina to North Carolina. In order from south to north, separated by type, they are as follows.

== Business loops ==
=== Tabor City business loop ===
U.S. Highway 701 Business
- Location: Tabor City, North Carolina
- Length: 2.36 mi (3.80 km)

U.S. Route 701 Business (US 701 Bus.) is a 2.36-mile (3.80 km) business route of US 701 through Tabor City, North Carolina. The highway begins at a directional intersection with US 701 just south of the South Carolina–North Carolina state line. US 701 Business parallels the Waccamaw Coast Line Railroad across the state line and into the town of Tabor City as two-lane Hickman Road. At the south end of downtown, the business route intersects NC 410 (Green Sea Road) at 3rd Street and runs concurrently two blocks to the north end of downtown, where they meet NC 904 (Main Street) at 5th Street. The three highways head northeast along 5th Street, which has two lanes plus a center turn lane. After three blocks, NC 904 splits southeast as Pireway Road. US 701 Business and NC 410 continue northeast to the business route's northern terminus in an industrial area at US 701. NC 410 continues northeast for a short distance with US 701 before splitting north.

==== Major intersections ====
State	County	Location	mi	km	Destinations	Notes
South Carolina	Horry		0.00	0.00	US 701 south	No access to US 701 north; continuation beyond southern terminus
			0.2 0.00	0.32 0.00	South Carolina–North Carolina state line	
North Carolina	Columbus	Tabor City	0.8	1.3	NC 410 south (Green Sea Road) / Third Street	Southern end of NC 410 concurrency
North Carolina	Columbus	Tabor City	0.9	1.4	NC 904 west (Fifth Street west)	Southern end of NC 904 concurrency
North Carolina	Columbus	Tabor City	1.1	1.8	NC 904 east (Pireway Road)	Northern end of NC 904 concurrency
North Carolina	Columbus	Tabor City	2.1	3.4	NC 410 north / US 701	Northern end of NC 410 concurrency; northern terminus
1.000 mi = 1.609 km; 1.000 km = 0.621 mi: Concurrency terminus; Incomplete access

=== Whiteville business loop ===
U.S. Highway 701 Business
- Location: Whiteville, North Carolina
- Length: 4.72 mi (7.60 km)

U.S. Route 701 Business (US 701 Business) is a 4.72-mile (7.60 km) business route of US 701 through Whiteville, North Carolina. The business route, which starts as Madison Street, begins as a two-lane road at an acute intersection with US 701 (J.K. Powell Boulevard) on the southern edge of the city. US 701 Business expands to a four-lane road with center turn lane after its intersection with NC 130 (Love Mill Road). The highway reduces to two lanes after crossing Soules Swamp into the downtown area and veers north at its grade crossing of the Carolina Southern Railroad. US 701 Business passes through a residential area before reaching a cluster of county offices. The highway meets US 74 Business and US 76 Business at a roundabout that encircles the Columbus County Courthouse. The US 74 and US 76 business routes head west from the roundabout along Washington Street and east as Jefferson Street. US 701 Business continues north on Pinckney Street, which passes through another residential neighborhood before leaving the city at its overpass of the US 74 and US 76 freeway. The business route gains the name James B. White Highway to its northern terminus at US 701, which continues north with the same name.

=== Clarkton business loop ===
U.S. Route 701 Business
- Location: Clarkton, North Carolina
- Length: 2.86 mi (4.60 km)

U.S. Route 701 Business (US 701 Business) is a 2.86-mile (4.60 km) business route of US 701 through Clarkton, North Carolina. The business route begins at US 701 (James B. White Highway) in far northern Columbus County. The two-lane highway heads northeast into Bladen County and becomes College Street, which veers north and parallels US 701 three blocks to the east as it enters the town of Clarkton. US 701 Business intersects NC 211 (Green Street) and has a grade crossing of CSX's Wilmington Subdivision. At the north town limit, the business route veers northwest and reconnects with US 701.

=== Clinton business loop ===
U.S. Route 701 Business
- Location: Clinton, North Carolina
- Length: 5.70 mi (9.17 km)

U.S. Route 701 Business (US 701 Business) is a 5.70-mile (9.17 km) business route of US 701 through Clinton, North Carolina. The business route, which passes downtown Clinton to the east, begins at a partial cloverleaf interchange with Faircloth Freeway, which heads southeast as US 421 and northwest with both US 701 and US 421. US 701 also heads south as Garland Highway. US 701 Business heads north as Southeast Boulevard, which starts as two lanes but expands to four plus center turn lane at Rowan Road shortly before entering the city limits. The business route intersects NC 24 (Martin Luther King Jr. Boulevard) and runs concurrently with the state highway through an industrial area, where they have a grade crossing of a CSX rail spur. NC 24 splits east at US 701 Business's intersection with Warsaw Road. Northeast of downtown, the highway meets the southern end of NC 403 (College Street). US 701 Business continues northwest as Northeast Boulevard before curving north, exiting the city limits, and continuing as two-lane Hobbton Highway. North of the city, the business route ends at the intersection at the northern end of the US 701 freeway; US 701 continues north along Hobbton Highway.

== Truck routes ==
=== Conway truck route 1 ===
U.S. Highway 701 Truck
- Location: Conway, South Carolina
- Length: 27.328 mi (43.980 km)

U.S. Route 701 Truck (US 701 Truck) is a truck route of US 701 that partially exists in Conway and Red Hill. It also exists in Hickory Grove. The highway is entirely concurrent with US 378 Truck. It directs truck traffic onto US 501, South Carolina Highway 544 Connector (Red Hill 1) (SC 544 Conn.), US 501 Business (US 501 Bus.), SC 90, Old Reaves Ferry Road, and SC 905. It is loosely signed, frequently in Conway and Red Hill, and infrequently outside the city limits of both locales.

=== Conway truck route 2 ===
U.S. Highway 701 Truck
- Location: Conway, South Carolina
- Length: 1.468 mi (2.363 km)

U.S. Route 701 Truck (US 701 Truck) is a truck route to direct truck traffic to avoid downtown Conway to the north. The highway has a concurrency with US 501 on Church Street at the northern end of the US 501/US 701 concurrency at 16th Avenue, then makes a right turn onto Mill Pond Road, which travels northeast until curving toward the east and terminating at the intersection of US 701 (Main Street) and Sherwood Drive.

The entire route is in Conway, Horry County.

mi	km	Destinations	Notes
0.000	0.000	US 501 Bus. south / US 701 north (16th Avenue north) – Loris, Nichols US 501 south / US 701 south (Church Street south) – Georgetown, All beaches 16th Avenue south – National Guard Armory	Southern end of US 501 concurrency; southern terminus of US 701 Truck; northern terminus of US 501 Bus.; 16th Avenue south provides access to Conway–Horry County Airport.
0.400	0.644	Mill Pond Road south to US 378 US 501 north (Church Street)	Northern end of US 501 concurrency
1.468	2.363	Main Street (US 701) / Sherwood Drive east	Northern terminus; roadway continues as Sherwood Drive.
1.000 mi = 1.609 km; 1.000 km = 0.621 mi: Concurrency terminus

== Former alternate routes ==
=== Clinton alternate route ===
U.S. Highway 701A
- Location: Clinton, North Carolina
- Existed: 1948–1957

U.S. Route 701A (US 701A) was created in 1948 as a renumbering of US 701. It went along Lisbon, College, and Beamer St.

== Former business loops ==
=== Mount Pleasant business loop ===
U.S. Highway 701 Business
- Location: Mount Pleasant, South Carolina
- Existed: 1967–1992

U.S. Route 701 Business (US 701 Bus.) was a business route in Mount Pleasant, South Carolina that traveled concurrently with US 17 Bus. along part of South Carolina Highway 703 (SC 703) and all of Interstate 526 Business (I-526 Bus.) from 1967 to 1992.
