= South Carolina Highway 905 =

State highway in South Carolina, United States

South Carolina Highway 905

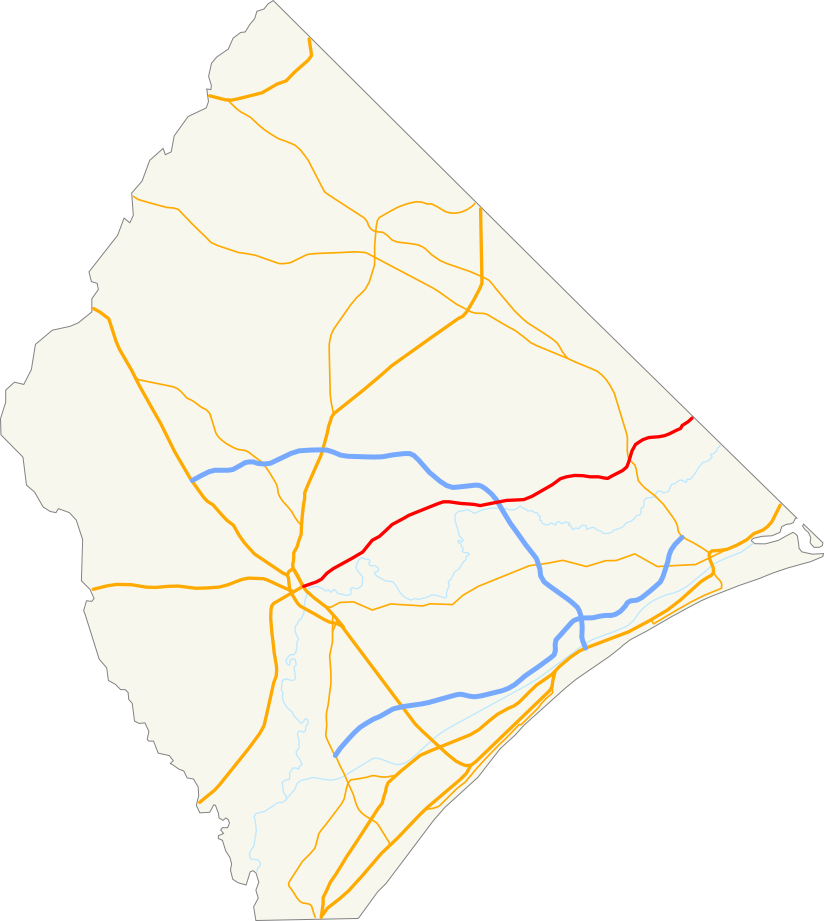

Route information
- Maintained by SCDOT
- Length: 25.610 mi (41.215 km)
- Existed: 1938–present

Major junctions
- South end: US 378 / US 701 in Conway
- SC 22 near Hickory Grove
- North end: NC 905 at the North Carolina state line near Longs

Location
- Country: United States
- State: South Carolina
- Counties: Horry

Highway system
- South Carolina State Highway System; Interstate; US; State; Scenic
← SC 903	→ SC 908

South Carolina Highway 905 (SC 905) is a 25.610-mile (41.215 km) state highway in Horry County. It travels from Conway to the North Carolina state line, where it continues as North Carolina Highway 905. It is parallel to the Waccamaw River.

== Route description ==
South Carolina Highway 905 begins at the western terminus of U.S. Route 701 in Conway, South Carolina and runs along Fourth Street later intersecting Business U.S. Route 501 at Main Street. After crossing a bridge over a narrow strip of Kingston Lake, it passes the historic Atlantic Coast Line Railroad Depot, where it crosses a three track grade crossing then narrows from four to two lanes as it enters forestland within the proximity of the Waccamaw River. The forestland gives way to moderate residential development and a signalized intersection with a local road named East Country Club Drive (the first of very few of them). Noticeable exceptions to the residential development include a large church complex. The road passes by some farmland aligned with a former section of what is today SC 905, then at a gas station encounters a street leading to that former segment called "Old Pireway Road." Beyond that point is an intersection leading to the Horry County Recycling Center, but the rest of the vicinity remains sparsely residential, until it passes Pineland Lake across from the other end of Old Pireway Road, gains the street name "Royal Tern Court," and approaches the Hickory Grove Community, where more mixed residential and commercial surroundings can be seen. After passing by Kingston Elementary School and Hickory Grove Baptist Church and Cemetery, the route has an intersection with a road named "Highway 19," not to be confused with South Carolina Highway 19.

From that point, the road curves more east-northeast as it passes by more mixed residential and commercial development, then another former section of SC 905 named Shell Road can be seen on the south side of the road. After the route curves towards the east-southeast, Shell Road returns to SC 905 across from the intersection with "Highway 66," not to be confused with South Carolina Highway 66, followed by a pair of housing developments across from one another, with a divided road on each side. Curving back to the east-northeast, the road starts to widen with a continuous center-left turn lane as it approaches the interchange with South Carolina Highway 22, which is a partial diamond interchange on the west side, and a quarter-cloverleaf interchange on the northeast corner. After the interchange it narrows down to two lanes again, and approaches. the second signalized intersection east of Conway which is Red Bluff Road and "Highway 31 East," which also has no connection to South Carolina Highway 31. East of that point, the road curves back more toward the northeast and the next road that passes for a major intersection is McNeil Chapel Road, also known as former South Carolina Highway 348. East of there the road gradually curves from northeast to east-southeast.

The route enters Longs without any signed notification indicating that it has entered the community. The first crossroad in the community is at Bear Grass Road, then at the St. John's A.M.E. Church encounters the western terminus of St. John's Circle. The route curves from southeast to northeast as it approaches the shared intersection with Fremont Road and the eastern terminus of St. Johns Circle, which is also crossed diagonally be a small power line right-of-way. East of this intersection, the road gains the street name "Pireway Road," which SC 905 keeps through the rest of its journey, then curves north in order to intersect South Carolina Highway 9, which is a four-lane divided highway from Green Sea to North Myrtle Beach. The route starts to curve back towards the east again, as it runs along a bridge over Buck Creek, then after the intersections of Old Buck Creek Road and Turkey Pen Road encounters a small housing development. Beyond this point is sporadic lots of residential development and ranch land, often interrupted by natural vegetation. SC 905 ends at the North Carolina State Line where it becomes North Carolina Highway 905, and the street name is changed from Pireway Road to Seven Creeks Highway.

== Major intersections ==
The entire route is in Horry County.

Location	mi	km	Destinations	Notes
Conway	0.000	0.000	US 378 east (Wright Boulevard) US 701 south (4th Avenue) – Georgetown US 378 west / US 701 north (Wright Boulevard) to US 501 – Loris, Marion, Lake City	Southern end of US 378 Truck / US 701 Truck; concurrency; southern terminus; US 378 west/US 701 north provides access to Conway–Horry County Airport.
Conway	0.750	1.207	US 501 Bus. (Main Street)	
Hickory Grove			Old Reaves Ferry Road east (US 378 Truck south / US 701 Truck south)	Northern end of US 378 Truck/US 701 Truck concurrency; western terminus of Old Reaves Ferry Road
	13.100	21.082	SC 22 – Marion, North Myrtle Beach, Myrtle Beach	Interchange
Longs	21.490	34.585	SC 9 – Loris, Little River, North Myrtle Beach	
Longs	25.610	41.215	NC 905 north – Whiteville	Continuation into North Carolina
1.000 mi = 1.609 km; 1.000 km = 0.621 mi
