= Hickory Grove, Horry County, South Carolina =

Hickory Grove
- Unincorporated community
- Location within South Carolina Location within the United States
- Coordinates: 33°52′36″N 78°58′24″W
- Country: United States
- State: South Carolina
- County: Horry
- Time zone: Eastern
- ZIP Code: 29526
- Area code: 843

Hickory Grove is an unincorporated community in Horry County, South Carolina, United States, along South Carolina Highway 905. Hickory Grove is located east of Conway and west of Longs.
