= Blands, North Carolina =

- Unincorporated community
- Location within the state of North Carolina
- Coordinates: 35°53′17″N 78°57′26″W
- Country: United States
- State: North Carolina
- County: Durham
- Time zone: UTC-5 (Eastern (EST))
  - Summer (DST): UTC-4 (EDT)
- GNIS feature ID: 1019215

Blands is an unincorporated community in southwestern Durham County, North Carolina, on the intersection of North Carolina Highway 751 and Stagecoach Road, at an elevation of 236 feet (72 m).
