= Longs, South Carolina =

- Unincorporated Community
- Interactive map of Longs, South Carolina
- Coordinates: 33°56′19″N 78°43′59″W
- Country: United States
- State: South Carolina
- County: Horry
- Elevation: 36 ft (11 m)

Population (2020)
  - Total: 9,523
- Time zone: UTC-5 (Eastern (EST))
  - Summer (DST): UTC-4 (EDT)
- ZIP Code: 29568
- Area codes: 843, 854
- GNIS feature ID: 1246465

Longs is a small unincorporated community in Horry County, South Carolina, United States. It lies north of Myrtle Beach, located at the intersection of S.C. 9 and S.C. 905.

== History ==
Of historical note, Longs became established when the Long family, who still have descendants living in South Carolina, California, North Carolina, and New York, began the construction of many public buildings and works including a Baptist church. The family moved into the construction and masonry industries with corporations such as JD Long Masonry and Long Enterprises stretching far along the east coast of the United States.
