= Special routes of U.S. Route 401 =

Special routes of U.S. Route 401

Highway system
- United States Numbered Highway System; List; Special; Divided

Several special routes of U.S. Route 401 exist, from South Carolina to North Carolina. In order from south to north, separated by type, they are as follows.

== Business loops ==
=== Laurinburg business loop ===
U.S. Highway 401 Business
- Location: Laurinburg, North Carolina
- Length: 4.4 mi (7.1 km)
- Existed: 1960–present

U.S. Route 401 Business (US 401 Bus) was established in 1960 as a renumbering of US 401A through downtown Laurinburg, it has remained unchanged since.

The entire route is in Laurinburg, Scotland County.

| mi | km | Destinations | Notes |
|---|---|---|---|
| 0.0 | 0.0 | US 15 / US 401 (McColl Road) – McColl | South end of US 15 Business overlap |
| 0.5 | 0.80 | I-74 / US 74 – Hamlet, Rockingham, Lumberton | |
| 1.3 | 2.1 | US 501 Bus. south – Raemon, Rowland | South end of US 501 Business overlap |
| 2.0 | 3.2 | US 74 Bus. (Church Street) – Hamlet, Maxton | |
| 2.9 | 4.7 | US 15 Bus. north (Aberdeen Road) / US 501 Bus. north – Aberdeen | North end of US 15/US 501 Business overlap |
| 4.4 | 7.1 | US 401 – Wagram, Raeford | |
1.000 mi = 1.609 km; 1.000 km = 0.621 mi: Concurrency terminus

=== Raeford business loop ===
U.S. Highway 401 Business
- Location: Raeford, North Carolina
- Length: 4.7 mi (7.6 km)

U.S. Route 401 Business (US 401 Bus) first started unofficially in 1954, US 15A was rerouted onto a bypass around Raeford, the old alignment through downtown was unnumbered until around the early 1960s, when it became US 401 Business. The route follows Harris Avenue, Main Street, and Central Avenue.

The entire route is in Raeford, Hoke County.

| mi | km | Destinations | Notes |
|---|---|---|---|
| 0.0 | 0.0 | US 401 – Laurinburg | |
| 0.8 | 1.3 | NC 211 east (Main Street) – Red Springs, Lumberton | East end of NC 211 overlap |
| 0.9 | 1.4 | NC 211 west (Main Street) – Aberdeen, Pinehurst | West end of NC 20/NC 211 overlap |
| 1.2 | 1.9 | NC 20 east (Saint Pauls Road) – Saint Pauls | East end of NC 20 overlap |
| 3.0 | 4.8 | Rockfish Road | |
| 4.7 | 7.6 | US 401 – Fayetteville | |
1.000 mi = 1.609 km; 1.000 km = 0.621 mi: Concurrency terminus

=== Fayetteville business loop ===
U.S. Highway 401 Business
- Location: Fayetteville, North Carolina
- Length: 9.6 mi (15.4 km)
- Existed: late 1960s–present

U.S. Route 401 Business (US 401 Bus) was established in late 1960s from a renumbering of US 401, this business loop goes through Fayetteville via Raeford Road, Robeson Street, Martin Luther King Jr Freeway, and Ramsey Street.

The entire route is in Fayetteville, Cumberland County.

| mi | km | Destinations | Notes |
|---|---|---|---|
| 0.0 | 0.0 | US 401 – Raeford, Laurinburg | |
| 2.0 | 3.2 | All American Expressway – Fort Bragg, Pope Army Airfield | |
| 5.0 | 8.0 | NC 87 south (Martin Luther King Jr Freeway) | South end of NC 87 overlap |
| 6.0 | 9.7 | Hay Street | |
| 6.3 | 10.1 | NC 24 / NC 87 north (Bragg Boulevard) | North end of NC 87 overlap |
| 7.0 | 11.3 | Ramsey Street | |
| 8.0 | 12.9 | Rosehill Road | |
| 9.6 | 15.4 | US 401 – Lillington | |
1.000 mi = 1.609 km; 1.000 km = 0.621 mi: Concurrency terminus

=== Rolesville business loop ===
U.S. Highway 401 Business
- Location: Rolesville, North Carolina
- Length: 4.67 mi (7.52 km)
- Existed: 2015–present

U.S. Route 401 Business (US 401 Bus) is a 4.67-mile (7.52 km) business loop that runs along Main Street through downtown Rolesville. The Town of Rolesville had been planning a bypass of the town since 1985, but the project was delayed for many years. U.S. Route 401 originally passed through the town until the bypass was completed in 2015. The business loop designation was approved by AASHTO on May 29, 2014, with its official establishment dependent on the opening of the Rolesville bypass, which would be designated as U.S. 401. The Rolesville bypass opened on July 16, 2015.

Major Intersections
| Destination | Note |
|---|---|
| US 401- Raleigh | Superstreet Intersection |
| Jonesville Road | |
| Burlington Mills Road | |
| Rodgers Road | |
| Young Street | |
| Pulley Town Road | |
| US 401 (Louisburg Road) - Louisburg | Superstreet Intersection |

== Former business loops ==
=== Bennettsville business loop ===
U.S. Highway 401 Business
- Location: Bennettsville, South Carolina
- Length: 3.4 mi (5.5 km)
- Existed: 1958–1989

U.S. Route 401 Business (US 401 Bus.) was a 3.4-mile (5.5 km) business route of US 401 that traveled through Bennettsville via Main Street and Tyson Avenue. It was established in 1958, when mainline US 401 was bypassed south of Bennettsville; it followed the old alignment. By 1990, the highway was decommissioned with most being replaced by an extension of SC 385.

== Former alternate routes ==
=== Laurinburg alternate route ===
U.S. Highway 401A
- Location: Laurinburg, North Carolina
- Length: 4.4 mi (7.1 km)
- Existed: 1957–1960

U.S. Route 401 Alternate (US 401A) was established in 1957, when US 401 was re-established, it replaced US 15A alignment through downtown Laurinburg, via Main Street. It was renumbered in 1960 into US 401 Business.
