= Virginia State Route 130 =

State highway in central Virginia, US

State Route 130

Route information
- Maintained by VDOT
- Length: 34.69 mi (55.83 km)
- Existed: 1933–present
- Tourist routes: Virginia Byway

Major junctions
- West end: US 11 at Natural Bridge
- US 501 in Glasgow; US 29 near Madison Heights
- East end: SR 669 / SR 670 near Madison Heights

Location
- Country: United States
- State: Virginia
- Counties: Rockbridge, Amherst

Highway system
- Virginia Routes; Interstate; US; Primary; Secondary; Byways; History; HOT lanes
← SR 129	→ SR 131

Virginia State Route 130 (SR 130) is a primary state highway in the U.S. state of Virginia. The state highway runs 34.69 miles (55.83 km) from U.S. Route 11 (US 11) at Natural Bridge east to SR 669 and SR 670 east of US 29 near Madison Heights. SR 130 runs concurrently with US 501 from Glasgow through the James River gorge through the Blue Ridge Mountains, connecting eastern Rockbridge County with western and southern Amherst County near Lynchburg.

SR 130 is a Virginia Byway west of US 29 Business near Madison Heights.

== Route description ==
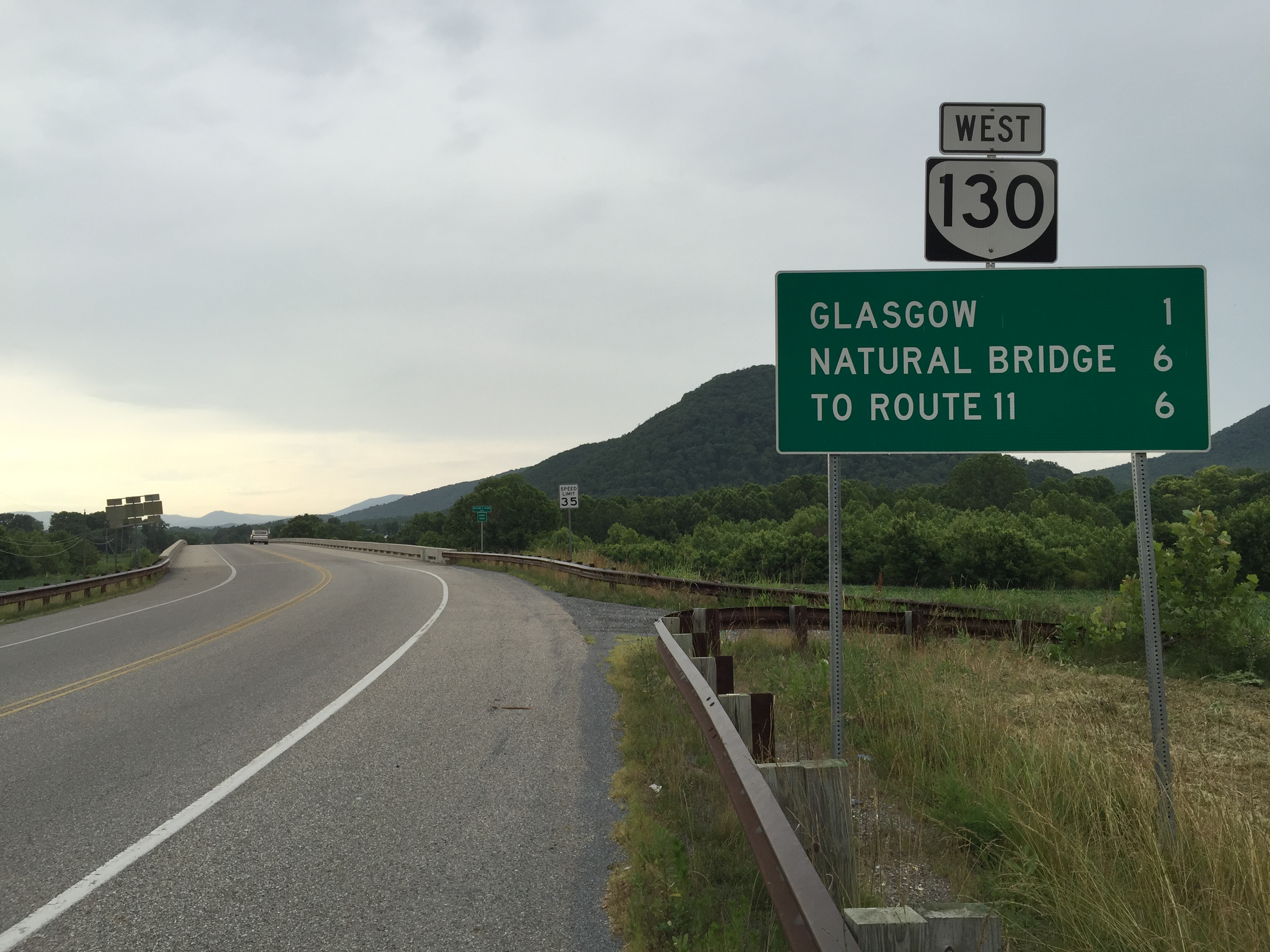
View west along SR 130 at US 501 near Glasgow

SR 130 begins at US 11 (Lee Highway) in the hamlet of Natural Bridge next to Natural Bridge Hotel. The state highway heads east as two-lane undivided Wert Faulkner Highway, which provides access to the visitor center that serves the underside of the National Historic Landmark. At Natural Bridge Station, SR 130 passes by the southern end of Sallings Mountain and under Norfolk Southern Railway's Roanoke District. The state highway passes through the town of Glasgow, where the highway has an at-grade intersection with a rail connector between the Roanoke District and CSX's James River Subdivision. SR 130 exits Glasgow by crossing the Maury River then meets US 501 (Glasgow Highway) at an intersection east of the river.

SR 130 and US 501 follow the Maury River south to its mouth at the James River, then parallel the James River and the James River Subdivision rail line east through the river's gorge through the Blue Ridge Mountains. Shortly before crossing the Rockbridge–Amherst line, the two highways leave the level of the river and have a winding crossing of the mountain. Shortly after the highways return to water level and the CSX rail line crosses to the south side of the river, US 501 crosses the James River into Bedford County to head toward Lynchburg. SR 130 continues east as Elon Road, which veers away from the river and has a connecting ramp interchange with the Blue Ridge Parkway. The state highway crosses the Pedlar River and passes through a gap in Tobacco Row Mountain before reaching the hamlet of Elon.

SR 130 continues southeast to the northern fringe of Madison Heights, where the highway crosses over Norfolk Southern's Washington District rail line and intersects US 29 Business (Amherst Highway). The state highway widens to four lanes at the intersection and becomes a divided highway, Amelon Expressway, at SR 669 (Amelon Road). SR 130 has an intersection with SR 677 (Dixie Airport Road) just west of its diamond interchange with US 29. East of the interchange, the state highway becomes a two-lane undivided road to its eastern terminus at the intersection of SR 669 (Glade Road) and SR 670 (Izaak Walton Road).

== Major intersections ==
County	Location	mi	km	Destinations	Notes
Rockbridge	Natural Bridge	0.00	0.00	US 11 (South Lee Highway) to I-81 – Lexington, Staunton, Roanoke	Western terminus
Rockbridge		6.30	10.14	US 501 north (Glasgow Highway) – Buena Vista	West end of concurrency with US 501
Amherst		12.67	20.39	US 501 south – Big Island, Lynchburg	East end of concurrency with US 501
Amherst				Blue Ridge Parkway	Interchange
Amherst				SR 635 (Buffalo Springs Turnpike) to US 60 – Pedlar Mills, Pleasant View	
Amherst	Madison Heights	32.16	51.76	US 29 Bus. (South Amherst Highway) – Amherst, Lynchburg	
Amherst	Madison Heights	34.21	55.06	US 29 – Amherst, Danville	Diamond interchange
Amherst	Madison Heights	34.69	55.83	SR 669 / SR 670 (Izaak Walton Road / Glade Road)	Eastern terminus
1.000 mi = 1.609 km; 1.000 km = 0.621 mi: Concurrency terminus

none	Spurs of SR 14; 1923–1928	SR 142 >
< SR 316	District 3 State Routes; 1928–1933	SR 318 >
< SR 800	District 8 State Routes; 1928–1933	SR 802 >
