= Special routes of U.S. Route 501 =

Special routes of U.S. Route 501

Highway system
- United States Numbered Highway System; List; Special; Divided

A total of at least eight special routes of U.S. Route 501 exist and at least four have been decommissioned.

== South Carolina ==
=== Conway business loop ===
U.S. Highway 501 Business
- Location: Conway, South Carolina
- Length: 4.600 mi (7.403 km)

U.S. Route 501 Business (US 501 Bus.) is a 4.600-mile (7.403 km) business route of US 501 in Conway and Red Hill. It is a former segment of US 501 that travels into downtown Conway. The highway begins in Red Hill, and utilizes a flyover with part of the western terminus of South Carolina Highway 544 (SC 544). The former terminus of SC 544 can be found at the next signalized intersection (unsigned as SC 544 Connector) which is shared with a local street named French Collins Road. At this intersection, it begins a concurrency with US 378 Truck/US 701 Truck/SC 90 Truck. Shortly after this, it intersects the western terminus of SC 90. Here, the truck routes, split off onto SC 90. The rest of the highway travels straight through rural forestland until it approaches the Waccamaw River Memorial Bridge (Main Street Bridge) over the Waccamaw River. After crossing the bridge, it enters the Conway Downtown Historic District. The first major intersection within the district is the eastern terminus of US 378 (Third Street). One block later, the highway intersects SC 905 and unsigned US 378 Truck/US 701 Truck at 4th Avenue. North of there, US 501 Bus. passes by more historic sites in the city such as the City Post Office, the Beaty-Little House, the Burroughs School and others. At Collins Park Road/16th Avenue, US 701 replaces US 501 Bus. as the designation north along Main Street while the business route turns west joining that route in a wrong-way concurrency. West of Elm Street, it curves to the southwest. US 501 Bus. ends at US 501 (Church Street), however 16th Avenue continues as a local street that terminates at US 378.

=== Marion business loop ===
U.S. Highway 501 Business
- Location: Marion, South Carolina
- Length: 7.210 mi (11.603 km)

U.S. Route 501 Business (US 501) is a 7.210-mile (11.603 km) business route of US 501 that exists in Marion. It is a former segment of US 501 that travels into downtown Marion. The highway begins south of Marion at a trumpet interchange, which also includes the beginning of a concurrency with South Carolina Highway 41 Alternate (SC 41 Alt.). The next major intersection, SC 576 veers off to the northwest towards Florence. Before the highway enters the city, it is named South Main Street. However, the highway doesn't officially enter the city limits until just south of the Silver Trace Apartment complex, but the surroundings remain mostly residential, although a few commercial properties can be found further to the north. US 501 Bus. becomes a divided highway as it approaches the intersection with US 76(Liberty Street), but only at the southern approach of the intersection. The northwest corner contains a park with an obelisk. Between US 76 and Baptist Street, the western side of US 501 Bus. includes a former segment of the highway. At Godbold Street, South Main Street becomes North Main Street, which eventually enters the Marion Historic District which includes a former railroad line that's now part of the Marion Hike and Bike Trail. Right after the historic former Marion High School, which is on the National Register of Historic Places (NRHP) and still the headquarters for the county school district, SC 41 Alt. makes a right turn onto Jones Avenue. The business route becomes more rural once again as it leaves downtown Marion, and the one last intersection with Paul Road and Meadowview Road exists before the highway terminates at another trumpet interchange with US 501.

== North Carolina ==
=== Laurinburg business loop ===
U.S. Highway 501 Business
- Location: Laurinburg, North Carolina
- Length: 3.6 mi (5.8 km)
- Existed: 1960–present

Established in 1960 when mainline US 501 was bypassed around Laurinburg. US 501 Business, in concurrency partly with US 15 Business and US 401 Business, traverses along Jones Road, Main Street, and Aberdeen Road.

Major intersections==

The entire route is in Laurinburg, Scotland County.

| mi | km | Destinations | Notes |
|---|---|---|---|
| 0.0 | 0.0 | US 501 (Jones Road) – Raemon, Rowland | |
| 1.3 | 2.1 | US 15 Bus. south / US 401 Bus. south (Main Street) – McColl | South end of US 15/401 Business overlap |
| 2.0 | 3.2 | US 74 Bus. (Church Street) – Hamlet, Maxton | |
| 2.9 | 4.7 | US 401 Bus. north (Main Street) | North end of US 401 Business overlap |
| 3.6 | 5.8 | US 15 / US 401 / US 501 – Aberdeen, Wagram, Raeford | North end of US 15 Business overlap |
1.000 mi = 1.609 km; 1.000 km = 0.621 mi: Concurrency terminus

=== Durham business loop ===
U.S. Highway 501 Business
- Location: Durham, North Carolina
- Length: 9.4 mi (15.1 km)
- Existed: 1960–present

Established in 1960 as a renumbering of mainline US 501, along University Drive and Roxboro Street, through downtown Durham. It is in concurrency with US 15 Business for majority of its route and is relatively unchanged since inception.

Major intersections

The entire route is in Durham, Durham County.

| mi | km | Destinations | Notes |
|---|---|---|---|
| 0.0 | 0.0 | US 15 / US 501 – Chapel Hill, Durham Downtown | South end of US 15 Business overlap |
| 1.6 | 2.6 | NC 751 (Academy Road) | To Duke University |
| 4.5 | 7.2 | NC 147 (Durham Freeway) – RTP | |
| 5.0 | 8.0 | US 70 Bus. / NC 98 (Ramseur Street/Holloway Street) | Brief overlap of eastbound US 70 Business and NC 98 |
| 6.4 | 10.3 | I-85 / US 15 / US 70 – Greensboro, Oxford, Raleigh | North end of US 15 Business overlap |
| 6.5 | 10.5 | NC 55 east (Avondale Street) | |
| 9.4 | 15.1 | US 501 – Roxboro, Durham | |
1.000 mi = 1.609 km; 1.000 km = 0.621 mi: Concurrency terminus

== Virginia ==
=== South Boston truck route ===
U.S. Route 501 Truck
- Location: South Boston, Virginia
- Length: 4.27 mi (6.87 km)

U.S. Route 501 Truck (US 501 Truck) is a Truck Detour around US 501 through South Boston. It begins at the intersection of US 58/360 and heads east overlapping those routes until the US 58/360 overlap ends, then turns onto US 360 until it reaches Hamilton Boulevard, heading northwest until finally reaching its parent route.

=== Lynchburg business route ===
U.S. Route 501 Business
- Location: Lynchburg, Virginia
- Length: 9.41 mi (15.14 km)

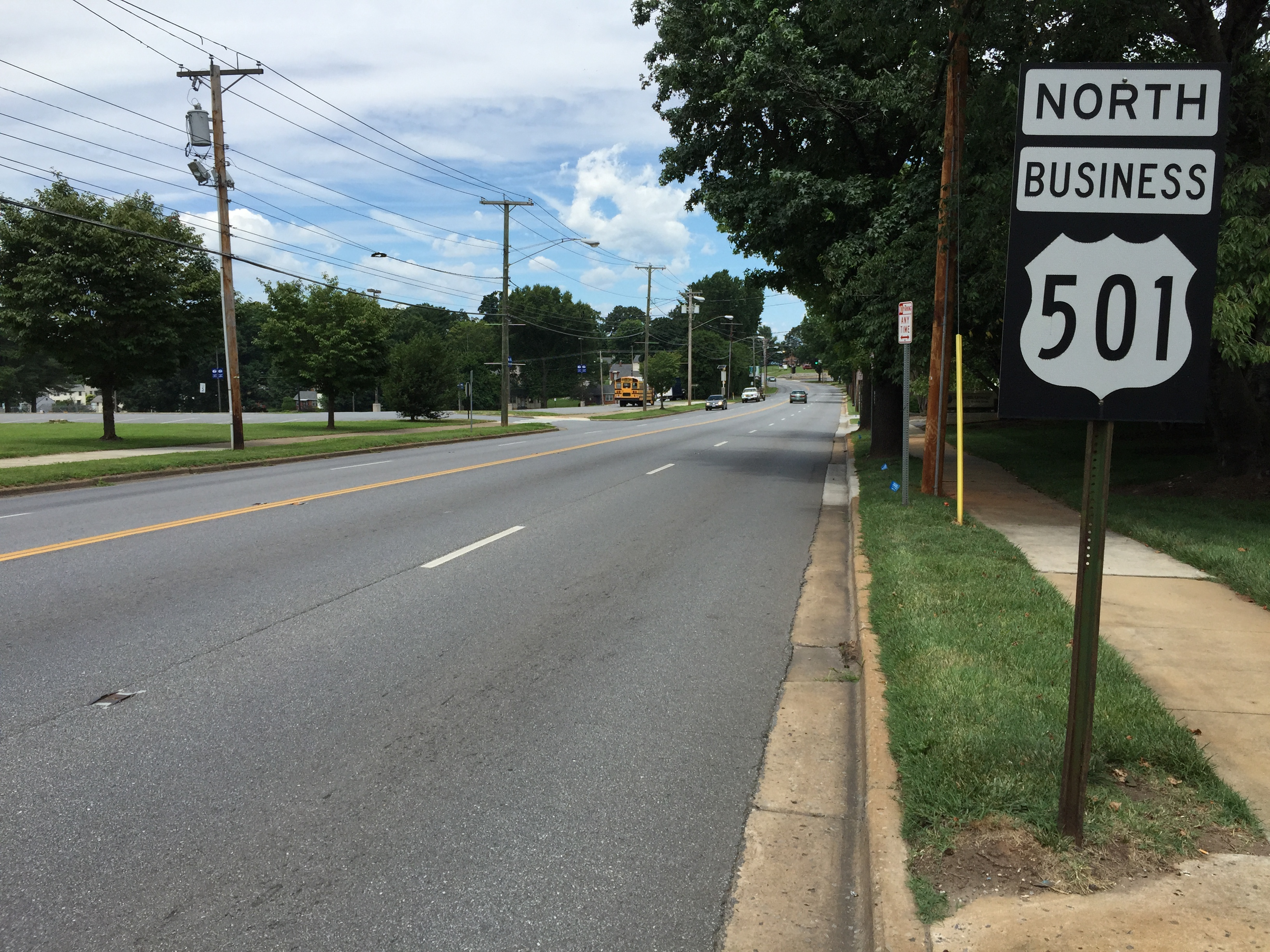
View north along US 501 Bus. in Lynchburg

U.S. Route 501 Business (US 501 Business) is a business route of US 501 in Lynchburg. The highway runs 9.41 miles (15.14 km) from US 29, US 460, and US 501 on the eastern edge of Lynchburg to US 501 on the western edge of Lynchburg. US 501 Business runs concurrently with US 460 Business on Campbell Avenue, a four-lane undivided highway, northwest from the highways' partial cloverleaf interchange with their mainline U.S. Highways and US 29. The business routes meet the northern end of SR 128 (Mayflower Drive) and cross over Norfolk Southern Railway's Blue Ridge District. Just north of the railroad, US 501 Business and US 460 Business veer onto Kemper Avenue, which crosses another rail line and has a cloverleaf interchange with US 29 Business (Lynchburg Expressway); this interchange serves as the northern terminus of US 221. The business routes and US 221 pass through a commercial area and by the Anne Spencer House, then turn west onto 12th Street and cross Norfolk Southern's Danville District rail line a few blocks south of the Lynchburg-Kemper Street Station, which is served by Amtrak.

At Campbell Avenue, US 221 and US 460 Business continue southwest on 12th Street (US 221 continues past 12th Street on it way towards Perry, FL) while US 501 Business turns northwest onto Campbell Avenue, which becomes Langhorne Road after the intersection with Park Avenue. The business route intersects SR 163 (Memorial Avenue) at the historic home Centerview. West of Holy Cross Regional Catholic School, US 501 Business leaves the densely populated part of Lynchburg and curves north, passing under a former railroad bridge. West of the Rivermont Historic District, the business route veers onto Rivermont Terrace, then turns west onto Rivermont Avenue, which becomes Boonsboro Road at its intersection with Link Road. US 501 Business continues on Boonsboro Road to its northern terminus at US 501, which heads south on the Lynchburg Expressway and north on the continuation of Boonsboro Road.

=== Buena Vista business route ===
U.S. Route 501 Business
- Location: Buena Vista, Virginia
- Length: 0.99 mi (1,590 m)

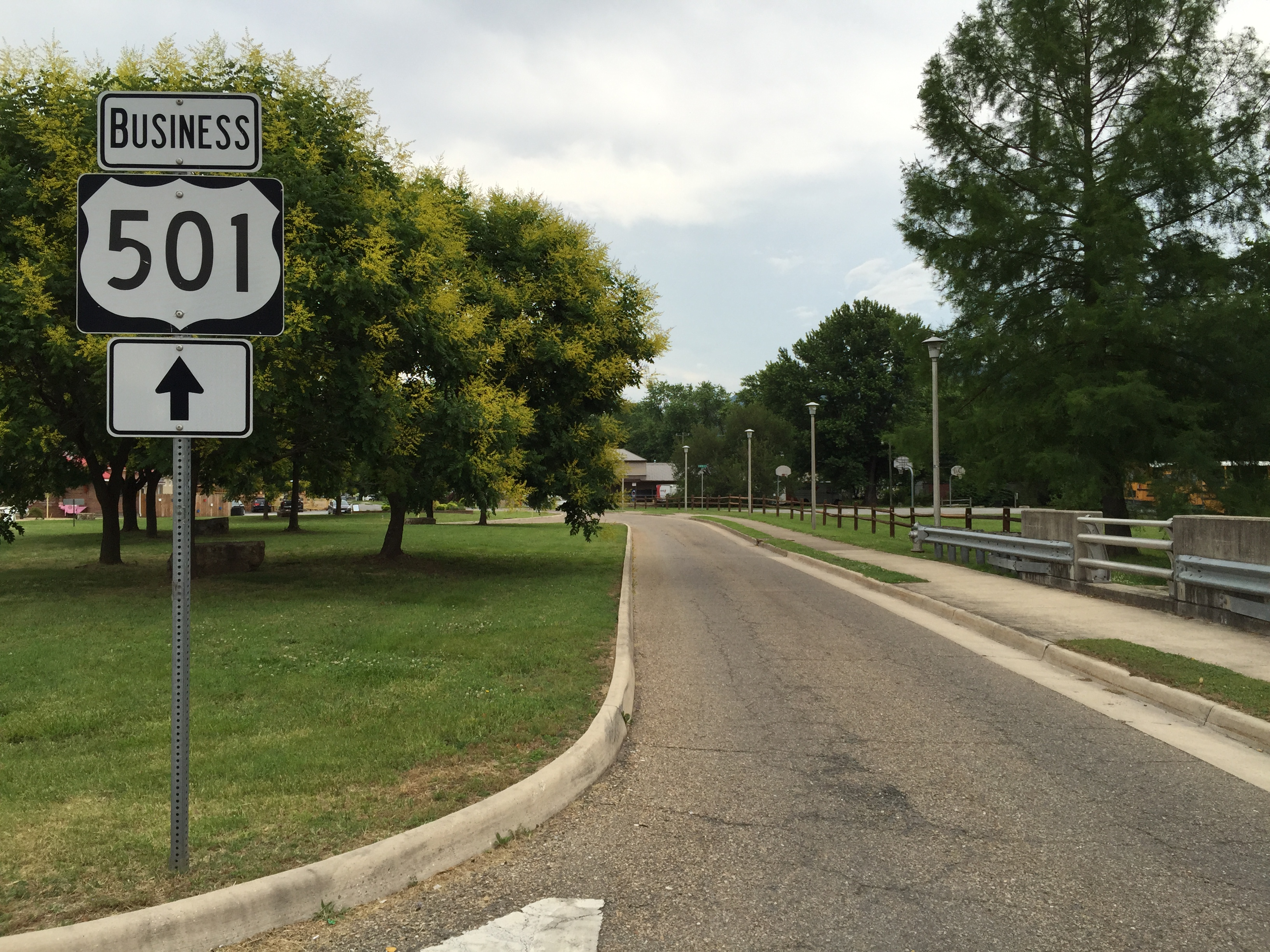
US 501 Bus. northbound at US 501 in Buena Vista

U.S. Route 501 Business (US 501 Business) is a business route of US 501 in Buena Vista. The highway runs 0.99 miles (1.59 km) between junctions with US 501 within the city of Buena Vista. When US 501 veers from Magnolia Avenue onto Sycamore Avenue at 16th Street, US 501 Business continues north on Magnolia Avenue, which serves as the main business street of the city. Just south of the Southern Virginia University campus, the business route veers northwest on Park Avenue, which the highway follows to its northern terminus at US 501 (Beech Street) just south of US 501's northern terminus at US 60.

=== Buena Vista truck route ===
U.S. Route 501 Truck
- Location: Buena Vista, Virginia

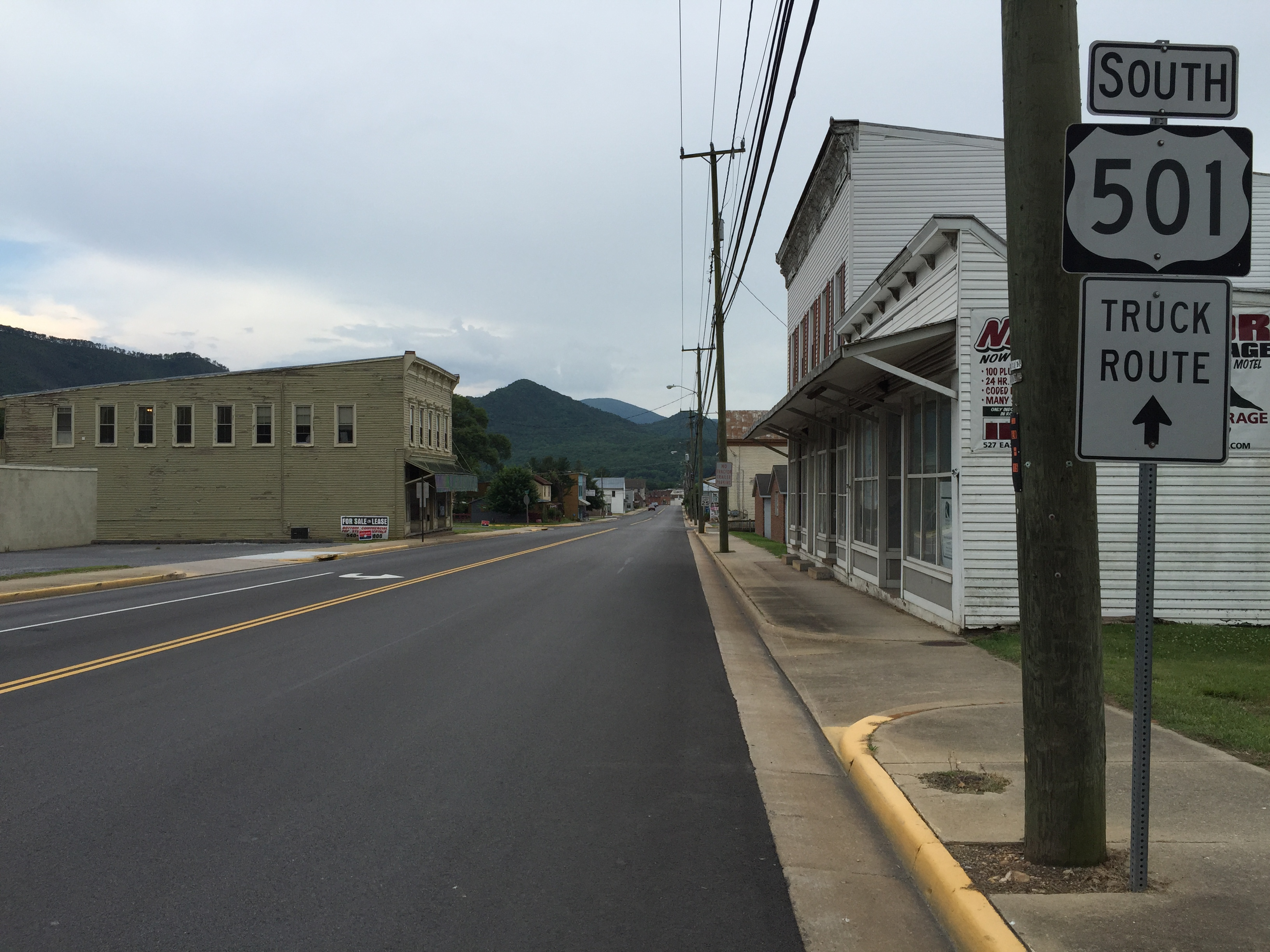
US 501 marked as a truck route in Buena Vista

U.S. Route 501 Truck (US 501 Truck) is actually mainline US 501 in Buena Vista marked as a truck route along Sycamore Avenue between Magnolia Avenue at 16th Street, and Park Avenue and Factory Street.

== Former routes ==
=== Sanford alternate route ===
U.S. Highway 501A
- Location: Sanford, North Carolina
- Length: 6.5 mi (10.5 km)
- Existed: 1957–1960

Established in 1957 when mainline US 501 was bypassed west of Sanford. US 501A, in concurrency with US 1A and US 15A, traversed on Carthage Street and Hawkins Avenue. In 1960, it was renumbered as US 501 Business.

=== Sanford business loop ===
U.S. Highway 501 Business
- Location: Sanford, North Carolina
- Length: 6.5 mi (10.5 km)
- Existed: 1960–1978

Established in 1960 as a renumbering of US 501A along Carthage Street and Hawkins Avenue, in concurrency with US 1 Business and US 15 Business. Between 1976 and 1978, US 1 Business was rerouted along NC 42 on Wicker Street; it is believed that both US 15 Business and US 501 Business were decommissioned by that time.

=== Chapel Hill alternate route ===
U.S. Highway 501A
- Location: Chapel Hill, North Carolina
- Length: 4.3 mi (6.9 km)
- Existed: 1953–1960

Established in 1953 when mainline US 501 was bypassed around Chapel Hill. US 501A, in concurrency with US 15A, traversed on Columbia Street and Franklin Street. In 1960, it was renumbered as US 501 Business.

=== Chapel Hill business loop ===
U.S. Highway 501 Business
- Location: Chapel Hill, North Carolina
- Length: 4.3 mi (6.9 km)
- Existed: 1960–1987

Established in 1960 as a renumbering of US 501A along Columbia and Franklin Streets, in concurrency with US 15 Business. It was decommissioned between 1985 and 1987.

== See also ==
- List of special routes of the United States Numbered Highway System
