= South Square Mall =

Shopping mall in Durham, North Carolina, U.S.

- Location: Durham, North Carolina, U.S.
- Coordinates: 35°57′58″N 78°57′27″W
- Opened: 1975
- Closed: 2002
- Developer: Faison Associates
- Num. of stores: 90
- Num. of anchor tenants: 3
- Floors: 2

South Square Mall is a defunct shopping mall that was located in Durham, North Carolina,

== History ==
Opened in 1975 and closed in 2002 due to competition from the newly opened Streets at Southpoint mall, its original anchors were Belk-Leggett (later renamed Hudson-Belk), J.C. Penney, and Montgomery Ward. Other stores located there included Piccadilly Cafeterias, Miller & Rhoads, Montaldo's (a high-end women's fashion boutique), a Big Star Supermarket, Central Carolina Bank and Trust (now Truist), and a four-screen movie theater. In addition, South Square had a food court located off to the side on the second level, making it the first mall in the Triangle area with one (Crabtree Mall, despite opening in 1972, did not get a food court until 1984).

During the mid-1980s, a number of significant changes took place. Montgomery Ward vacated its space in 1985 as part of a corporate restructuring move made by the company. That space would eventually be filled by Ivey's (later Dillard's) a year later. It was during this time that the mall received its only interior upgrade.

Big Star closed its store in 1988 after being bought out by Harris Teeter, only to have the space filled by an Office Depot. Montaldo's vacated the mall in the late 1980s to a new location down the road in Chapel Hill. The movie theater closed in 1994 when a new cineplex operated by Carmike Cinemas opened less than a mile away.

== Life after the mall ==
After Belk and J.C. Penney relocated to Southpoint, Dillard's tried to hang in as the lone anchor, even though the mall itself was dying from the massive defections brought on by Southpoint's arrival. The mall closed in September 2002 after Dillard's shut down, only six months after Southpoint opened.

The mall was eventually razed in 2004 to make way for a big box retail hub that includes a SuperTarget, Sam's Club, Ross Dress for Less, and Petco. The lone remnants of the mall's former life an Office Depot and Firestone have since remained open and have been integrated into the newly built development, which retains the "South Square" name. Other tenants on site include Carolina Ale House and Discount Tire Company. A planned Applebee's restaurant for the site has been on hold after the one located across the street closed in 2006 due to under-performing sales at that location.
