= Raemon, North Carolina =

- CDP
- Location within the state of North Carolina
- Coordinates: 34°37′23″N 79°20′57″W
- Country: United States
- State: North Carolina
- County: Robeson

Area
  - Total: 4.34 sq mi (11.24 km^{2})
  - Land: 4.31 sq mi (11.17 km^{2})
  - Water: 0.027 sq mi (0.07 km^{2})
- Elevation: 164 ft (50 m)

Population (2020)
  - Total: 197
  - Density: 45.7/sq mi (17.64/km^{2})
- Time zone: UTC-5 (EST)
  - Summer (DST): UTC-4 (EDT)
- Area codes: 910, 472
- FIPS code: 37-54600
- GNIS feature ID: 2403458

Raemon is a census-designated place (CDP) in Robeson County, North Carolina, United States. The population was 197 at the 2020 census.

== Geography ==
According to the United States Census Bureau, the CDP has a total area of 4.4 square miles (11 km^{2}), of which 4.3 square miles (11.2 km^{2}) is land and 0.04 square miles (0.10 km^{2}) (0.92%) is water.

== Demographics ==
Historical population
| Census | Pop. | Note | %± |
|---|---|---|---|
| 2020 | 197 | | — |
U.S. Decennial Census

As of the census of 2000, there were 212 people, 74 households, and 56 families residing in the CDP. The population density was 49.0 inhabitants per square mile (18.9/km^{2}). There were 80 housing units at an average density of 18.5/sq mi (7.1/km^{2}). The racial makeup of the CDP was 14.15% White, 15.57% African American, 69.81% Native American, 0.47% from other races.

There were 74 households, out of which 43.2% had children under the age of 18 living with them, 54.1% were married couples living together, 21.6% had a female householder with no husband present, and 23.0% were non-families. 20.3% of all households were made up of individuals, and 9.5% had someone living alone who was 65 years of age or older. The average household size was 2.86 and the average family size was 3.26.

In the CDP, the population was spread out, with 32.5% under the age of 18, 11.8% from 18 to 24, 26.9% from 25 to 44, 21.7% from 45 to 64, and 7.1% who were 65 years of age or older. The median age was 30 years. For every 100 females, there were 82.8 males. For every 100 females age 18 and over, there were 68.2 males.

The median income for a household in the CDP was $10,391, and the median income for a family was $12,656. Males had a median income of $16,250 versus $23,750 for females. The per capita income for the CDP was $6,585. About 49.2% of families and 65.9% of the population were below the poverty line, including 78.7% of those under the age of eighteen and 36.0% of those 65 or over.
