= Colcor =

FBI corruption investigation in North Carolina

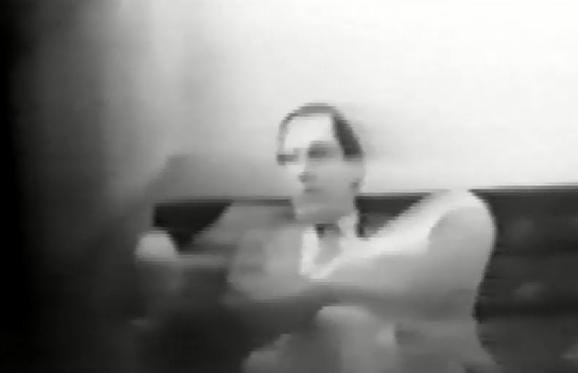
A still from a video shot by undercover agents showing their meeting with State Senator R. C. Soles Jr. in December 1981 during the course of their investigation. Soles was ultimately acquitted of criminal charges.

Colcor, short for Columbus County Corruption, was an undercover criminal investigation conducted by the United States Federal Bureau of Investigation (FBI) into corrupt activities involving government officials in Columbus County, North Carolina. While the FBI had for several years received complaints about local alleged protection rackets and election fraud, they did not begin an investigation until 1980, when one of their former informants moved to the county and reported that he was being told to pay bribes to ensure the smooth operation of his business. Their investigation centered on the activities of undercover agents posing as corrupt businessmen with connections to the Detroit Mafia.

Using an illegal gambling club and a precious metals business as fronts, the FBI agents successfully implicated a local judge, police chief, and the chairman of the county commission in bribe-taking. In an attempt to investigate election fraud, the agents initiated a referendum to legalize liquor-by-the-drink in the town of Bolton and attempted to buy votes to sway the outcome in favor of legalization, the first time the FBI had ever attempted to manipulate a public election. They also uncovered a scheme by a state legislator to burn down a business rival's warehouses but failed to stop the arson. The operation ended in 1982. Of 40 people indicted on state and federal charges, 38 were convicted, while State Senator R. C. Soles Jr. and Lieutenant Governor Jimmy Green were found not guilty on bribery offenses.

== Background ==
Columbus County is geographically the third-largest county in North Carolina, United States. In the early 1980s, the county hosted eight incorporated communities and about 51,000 residents. In the years preceding the Colcor investigation, the U.S. Federal Bureau of Investigation had received several complaints from local police officers and residents about alleged protection rackets run by public officials and election fraud. At the time of the FBI's operation, the county had a reputation for intense political competition marked by accusations of fraud and impropriety.

== Investigation ==
=== Beginnings and gambling club ===
In early 1980, Joseph Thomas Moody, an erstwhile paid informant for the FBI, moved to Whiteville to work as a trucker. Laid off within a few months due to an economic recession, he opened a gaming arcade in Whiteville to make money. In the course of operating the arcade, Moody came under pressure from local officials for small infractions and violations. While in a local jail on an unrelated assault charge, Moody was advised by his cellmate that he had "to pay people off" to operate his business without interruption. He then called the FBI field office in Charlotte. FBI agents decided to investigate further and gave Moody money to supply to his cellmate for guidance on benefitting from a protection racket, but he turned up no additional information.

Moody was soon thereafter released from jail. He befriend the owner of a lounge, James Carroll, who advised him that he was "attempting to pay off the wrong people" and that Carroll could facilitate bribes. Taking into account the previous complains they had received, upon being informed the FBI initiated an undercover investigation into corruption in Columbus County. Moody arranged for Carroll to meet FBI agent William Redden Jr., who was operating under the alias of Bill Leonard and pretending to be a Charlotte businessman interested in opening a nightclub in Columbus County. Carroll advised Redden that he could bribe District Judge J. Wilton Hunt Jr. into protecting his nightclub, which would allow gambling and prostitution.

As Hunt was a public official, any undercover operation aimed at implicating him in criminal activity was deemed "sensitive" and required approval from the FBI's Criminal Undercover Operations Review Committee. In late 1980 the committee and FBI Director William H. Webster approved the operation, codenamed "Colcor", short for "Columbus County Corruption". About a dozen undercover agents were ultimately involved in the operation. They reported to Terry Peters, the Colcor case agent, who was based in Wilmington. Peters reported to his supervisor in the Charlotte field office, Roger Schweikert, who forwarded information to FBI leaders in Washington D.C. and acted as a liaison with the United States Attorney's office for the Eastern District of North Carolina, based in Raleigh.

On December 3, Redden gave Hunt a $1,000 bribe in exchange for protection of his club and offered continuous bribes in the future. Hunt ultimately accepted $7,500 in bribes. In 1981 he altered a speeding infraction issued against another undercover FBI agent and introduced agents to two bookkeepers involved in illegal sports gambling. With Carroll's help, Moody and Redden then sought out Harold Lowery, the police chief of Lake Waccamaw, for help in starting a gambling club in his town. On December 9, 1980, Lowery agreed with Redden to protect a gambling club from police interference in exchange for $100 a week in bribes. Lowery ultimately collected $1,600. Redden suffered a heart attack in January 1981 and decided to retire. The FBI enlisted agent Robert J. Drdak to replace him, and Redden introduced Drdak to Lowery as a trusted business associate, Thomas "Doc" Ryan. As part of their cover, Drdak and other agents pretended to have connections with the Detroit Mafia. Drdak and one agent spent the winter of 1980/1981 managing the gambling establishment in Lake Waccamaw and establishing additional contacts in the community. They closed it in April 1981.

=== Metals fence ===
Drdak had gained experience in precious metals on a previous assignment. During the spring of 1981, he and another undercover agent involved with the gambling club, Jerry King, sought to further their investigation by opening a precious metals shop. They required a license from the county to operate their business. Hunt arranged for them to meet with the chairman of the Columbus County Board of Commissioners, Ed Walton Williamson, who supplied them with the license on March 31. The business, Quality Metals, opened a shop in Whiteville and operated a second store in neighboring Brunswick County. In May, King was replaced by Bradley Hoferkamp, who operated under the alias of Brad Henderson. That month, the agents learned the North Carolina General Assembly was considering strengthening regulations concerning precious metals dealers to prevent the fencing of stolen goods. They asked Williamson if he could use his political connections to alter or halt the legislation. He told them he could secure them a meeting with State Senator R. C. Soles Jr., a powerful politician who represented Columbus County in the General Assembly, and possibly Lieutenant Governor Jimmy Green.

With Williamson's assistance, the undercover agents met with Soles, who agreed to help them weaken the metals legislation. Through June, the agents continued to ask Williamson for updates on the legislation, and he assured them the matter was being dealt with, though he later admitted that he often told them what he thought they wanted to hear. The agents also offered Soles a gold bracelet to thank him for his help, though Soles offered to pay for it. Nevertheless, the metals bill passed in July. Williamson ultimately accepted over $10,000 in payment from the agents.

=== Bolton liquor referendum ===
By August 1981, Drdak and Hoferkamp were tiring of their metals front and wanted to open a bar instead. On August 18, the agents met Williamson in their rented townhouse—equipped with discrete microphones and a video camera—and told him of their plants. Columbus County and its communities did not permit the sale of liquor beverages in public establishments. Drdak asked Williamson where it would be easiest to alter the regulations to facilitate the sale of liquor at their bar. Williamson suggested the town of Bolton, a small community of about 560 residents, most of whom were black. Williamson explained that he "could get Bolton done with the tip of your fucking hat" because he could "control the black vote" in a referendum on legalizing liquor-by-the-drink. He advised them to give $1,000 to Bolton politician Herbert Riggins to turn out the vote in their favor and suggested they secure the approval of Soles, who he thought would have the ability to stop such a referendum if he disapproved of it.

Worried about the ethics concerning manipulating a public election, Drdak consulted with attorneys at the U.S. Department of Justice, who approved of the plan. The agents then gave an initial $200 to Riggins. Meeting with Soles in their townhouse in December, the agents told Soles about their desire to push for a liquor referendum in Bolton. Soles said he would not involve himself in a local referendum as long as Williamson and Riggins—who he considered key political allies—did not oppose it, and refused offers of money for his stance. The undercover agents ultimately supplied Riggins with $2,900 to buy the vote in their favor.

A referendum for legalizing liquor-by-the-drink in Bolton was eventually scheduled for April 30, 1982. As the date approached, Riggins and Williamson grew increasingly suspicious of law enforcement discovering their scheme, while the FBI began to hesitate about the propriety of manipulating an election, something it had never done before. The Department of Justice convened a federal grand jury in Raleigh in early 1982 to subpoena testimony from Columbus County politicians about vote buying, hoping it would frighten the conspirators in Bolton into canceling the referendum. While the grand jury did concern Columbus politicians, Williamson and Riggins felt that a sudden cancellation of the liquor vote would be equivalent to conceding the existence of a fraudulent scheme.

In a final attempt to stop the referendum, Assistant United States Attorney Douglas McCullough called Bolton officials the night before the vote to warn them of a potential conspiracy, though he did not mention the FBI's role to not blow their agents' cover. The Bolton town board of commissioners quickly convened to discuss the issue but voted to continue with the referendum. On April 30, Bolton residents voted to legalize liquor-by-the-drink, 136 to 76. Riggins was scared enough by the grand jury to avoid the town during the vote and ultimately spent most of the money he had been given on personal expenses.

=== Drugs and stolen goods ===
Over the course of several months in 1981, Hoferkamp purchased several stolen vehicles from Sandy White Jr. of Bladen County. In March 1982, Carroll introduced Drdak and Hoferkamp to two struggling businessmen, Julius Williamson Jr. and Roscoe Forrest Hall. Williamson indicated that he could sell them marijuana, and in early April he sold them 50 pounds. Later that month a trailer containing 1,500 J.C. Penney shoes—with a retail value of $257,000—was stolen from the port of Wilmington. Carroll and Hall acquired them after the original deal to sell them faltered, and instead sold them to the FBI agents. In June, Hall began discussing plans to traffic cocaine with the agents and sold them a grain as a sample, while another deal concerning marijuana was also negotiated.

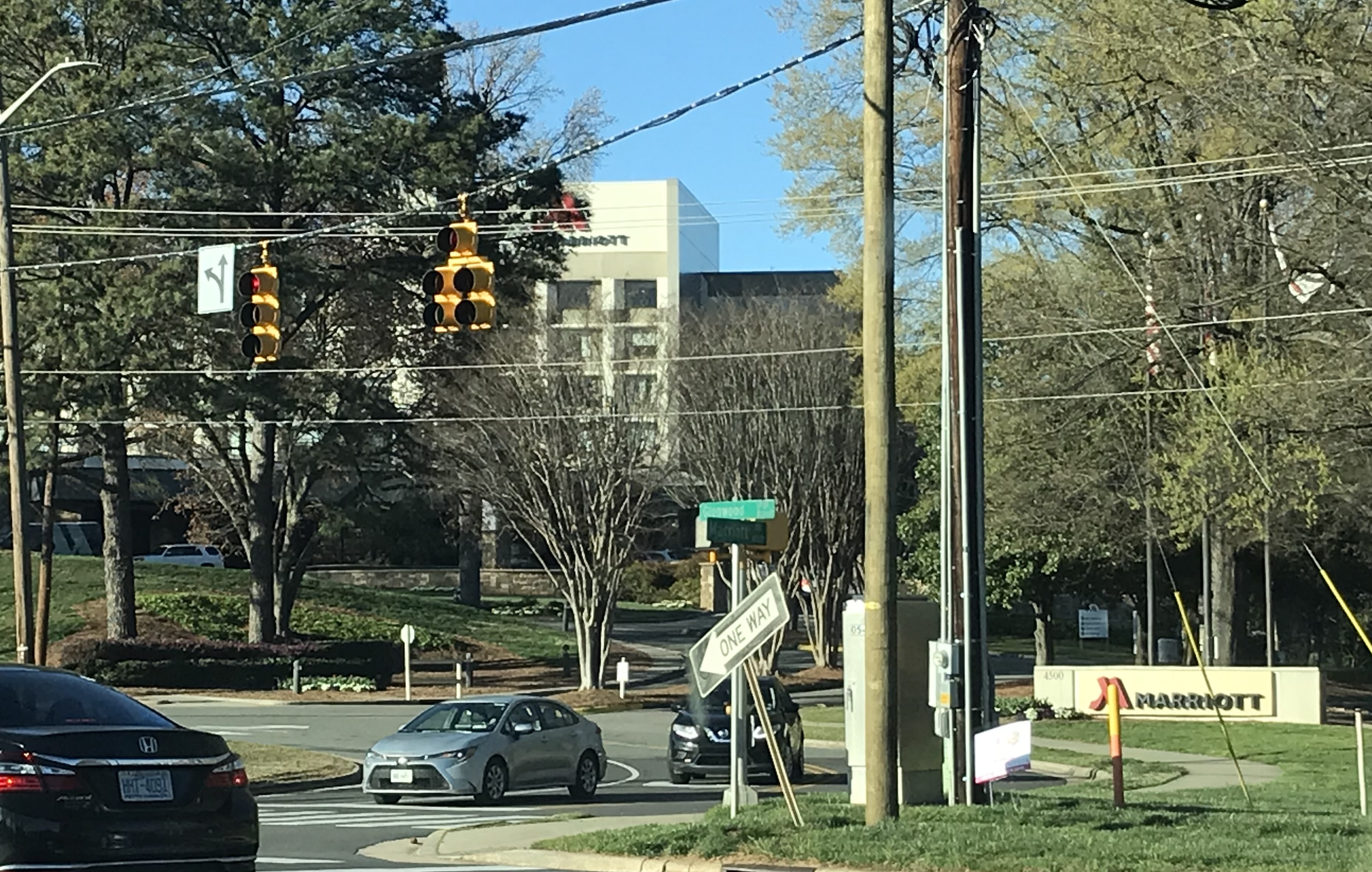
In June 1981, FBI agents conducted a drug bust outside the Marriott Hotel near Crabtree Valley Mall (pictured) in Raleigh.

Drdak and Hoferkamp arranged for a drug handover sting with Carroll and Hall outside of the Marriott Hotel near Crabtree Valley Mall in Raleigh on June 14. The drug sting was to include the staged arrest of Drdak and Hoferkamp so as to alleviate suspicions in Columbus County that they were working for law enforcement. Hall brought his brother and another friend to help him. After about an hour of negotiations of $100,000 for 119 pounds of marijuana, FBI agents and Raleigh Police officers (who were not informed of the undercover operation) moved in to bust the transaction. Forrest Hall was arrested even though the FBI originally wanted him to escape. Carroll successfully fled, dropping a gun in the parking lot, and spread word in Columbus County about the arrest, thus keeping Drdak's and Hoferkamp's cover.

Drdak and Hoferkamp were later released from police custody, telling their associates they were out on bail pending trial. They pinned the bust on an alleged informant, who was another undercover FBI agent. Carroll introduced them to Kenneth and Mary Lou Coleman, two Columbus County cocaine dealers. Kenneth Coleman bragged that he had killed and buried four men on his hog farm and offered to help them dispose of the supposed informant. On July 29, Drdak, Hoferkamp, and Carroll drove to Coleman's farm with the informant bound in the back of their vehicle. Coleman offered to execute the informant before burning his body and burying it. Before this was done, the FBI agents revealed their cover and arrested the Colemans and Carroll. The FBI searched the farm and could not locate the four graves Coleman had mentioned but did locate a ledger which recorded over $250,000 in cocaine transactions from August 1981 to January 1982.

=== Lieutenant Governor Jimmy Green ===
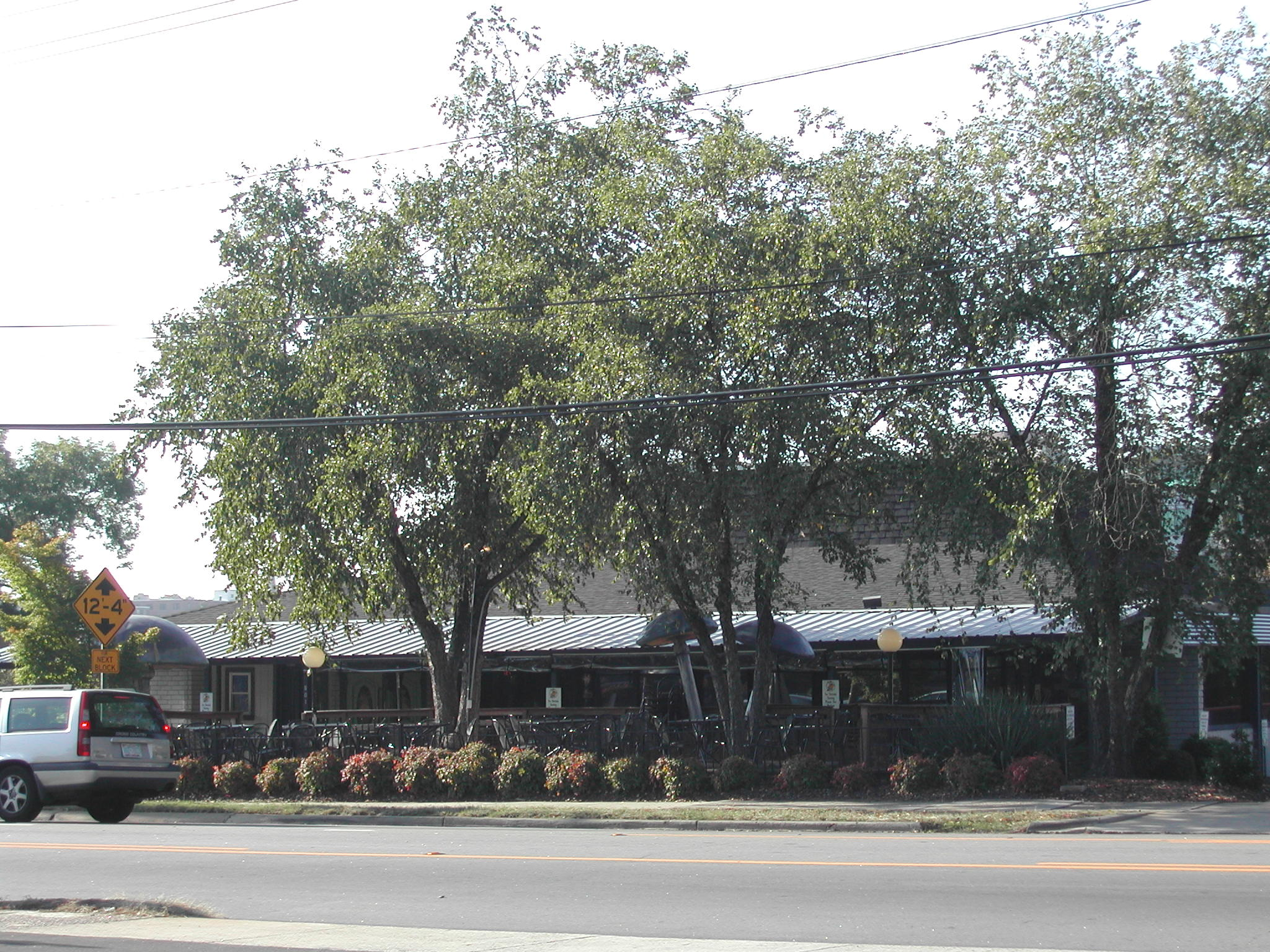
Green met with undercover agents at the Western Sizzler Restaurant in Raleigh (pictured in 2006 as the Mellow Mushroom) where he openly voiced his suspicions about being baited into criminally implicating himself.

After failing to make progress through county commissioner Ed Williamson, Drdak and Hoferkamp connected with then-Lieutenant Governor of North Carolina Jimmy Green through a former business associate of his, Howard Watts. Watts met with Green in December 1981 and reported to the agents that Green was willing to help them in undetermined activities for "green stamps". The FBI took this as an indication that Green was soliciting bribes, though Watts later admitted that he had lied about this portion of their conversation to receive money from the agents. Drdak paid Watts $5,000 for setting up a meeting between him and the lieutenant governor in January 1982. Drdak told Green he intended to establish a nightclub in Bolton and wanted his help in obtaining necessary licenses and avoiding scrutiny.

Green interacted with undercover agents several times, including a meeting at a restaurant in Raleigh where Green openly voiced his concern that they might be FBI agents and that he was being baited into an Abscam-like operation. The agents denied being law enforcement officers and maintained that they were business investors. In a later phone conversation, Green told Drdak, "if something comes up where I can be of assistance, ah, without, ah, jeopardizing myself, well, I'll always be glad to help." After being supplied an address for his political campaign committee, Drdak mailed Green a fake $2,000 check as a campaign contribution. Green received it on April 18. He did not deposit it, instead having an aide keep it aside until he returned it to Drdak on April 29 during their last meeting.

=== Arson in Lewiston ===
Drdak and Hoferkamp were introduced to State Representative G. Ronald Taylor by Watts. Taylor's family business, Taylor Manufacturing Company, was struggling and had lost $350,000 in a patent infringement lawsuit to Harrington Manufacturing Company, which was owned by State Senator J. J. Harrington of Bertie County. In their first meeting, Taylor asked for the agents to help him procure stolen jewelry, offered his help in smuggling drugs, and accepted an initial $1,500 bribe to perform political favors for them. Angered by the lawsuit against his company, Taylor discussed with Drdak and Hoferkamp in their second meeting plans to intimidate Harrington to negotiate a better outcome for himself. He suggested having the undercover agents blow up Harrington's car, break his legs, or damage his property.

While Drdak and Hoferkamp tried to secure assurances from Taylor that he would channel his intimidation tactics through them, he was impatient and enlisted the assistance of other associates to begin his campaign. The FBI wiretapped a phone call between Taylor and one of his associates on April 21 in which Taylor insisted that some of Harrington's facility buildings be set on fire within a week. Most of Harrington Manufacturing Company's buildings were located in Lewiston, Bertie County. Hoferkamp relayed this information to his superiors. The FBI ultimately decided to not warn Bertie County authorities or intervene themselves, convinced that any firm plan for arson activity would include Drdak and Hoferkamp and that the information they had at the time did not justify an intervention, which could blow the cover on the operation.

Two Bladen County men under pay from Taylor, White and Graham Franklin Bridgers, drove to Lewiston on the night of April 23. Once there they doused four Harrington Manufacturing Company warehouses with a fuel mixture and set them on fire. Crews from 15 fire departments were needed to control the ensuing inferno. Three warehouses were completely destroyed and another left damaged. The loss was estimated at $1.2 million in property, of which the Harringtons were able to recover $400,000 in insurance. Unaware of the FBI's knowledge of the conspiracy, the North Carolina State Bureau of Investigation (SBI) investigated the fire and arrested the arsonists a few days later. They arrested Taylor on arson conspiracy charges on May 13. Drdak and Hoferkamp were later able to successfully secure an offer to burn down a furniture warehouse in Fayetteville in an insurance fraud scheme and thus delay the arson indefinitely.

=== Conclusion ===
The FBI made a series of arrests related to Colcor in Columbus and Bladen counties on July 29, 1982. Colcor activities ended in December. According to FBI Agent in Charge of North Carolina Robert Pence, over the course of the investigation the bureau seized over $500,000 worth of illegal narcotics and recovered $1 million in stolen property. The operation cost $135,000 to execute, not including the salaries of the undercover agents. Drdak and Hoferkamp were commended by the FBI director for their work.

== Aftermath ==
=== Criminal proceedings ===
The FBI publicly revealed the Colcor operation and the first federal indictments at a press conference on July 29, 1982, in Raleigh. A total of 40 people were indicted for crimes observed during the course of the investigation. The same jury which issued the Colcor indictments also issued indictments resulting from Operation Gateway, a similar concurrent federal investigation into corruption and drug smuggling in Brunswick County. Most of the federal cases were prosecuted by McCullough. Of those indicted, 38 were convicted of crimes, with many reaching plea bargains with prosecutors.

The two accused who were not convicted were State Senator Soles and Lieutenant Governor Green. Soles was indicted on federal charges for aiding and abetting bribery, bribery, vote-buying, and perjury. In a jury trial he was found not guilty of the first charge, while a judge dismissed the other three. Lieutenant Governor Green was found not guilty on state bribery charges by a jury, arguing during his trial that he was only "smoking and probing" during his conversations with undercover operatives and was worried that they might be involved with his son.

State Representative Taylor was found guilty of state charges for arson and federal racketeering offences. He was sentenced to 20 years incarceration for the arson violation with five years incarceration for the federal offences to be served concurrently. He resigned his office shortly after the conviction. Watts, White, and Bridgers were also found guilty of state arson charges. County Commissioner Williamson was found guilty of racketeering and sentenced to eight years imprisonment. District Judge Hunt was found guilty of racketeering, and sentenced to 14 years imprisonment and ordered to pay a $10,000 fine. He resigned his judgeship following the conviction. Carroll cooperated with investigators and was sentenced to five years imprisonment for possession of stolen goods. Several others were found guilty of drug distribution charges.

=== Reactions ===
Some Columbus County residents were annoyed by the announcement of the Colcor case, with The News Reporter of Whiteville putting out an editorial which said the level of corruption in the county was exaggerated. Mayor of Whiteville H. B. Whitley said, "I don't think it makes Columbus County worse than any other county." Conversely, W. Horace Carter, the editor of the Tabor City Tribune, wrote "there is plenty of evidence that all is not kosher in Columbus County political circles, as we have charged for years, and the worms are wriggling out of the woodwork."

The U.S. House of Representatives published a report on the investigation. The report was critical of the FBI's involvement in the vote-buying sting surrounding the liquor referendum in Bolton, calling their actions "shocking" and accusing the bureau of displaying "insensitivity" in interfering with political processes. The North Carolina State Board of Elections ultimately invalidated the referendum and issued an opinion arguing that the FBI had interfered with Bolton residents' First Amendment rights. The board forwarded copies of its opinion to the FBI director "to ensure that in the future such operations are not utilized to influence North Carolina elections." The Harrington family and Bertie County officials were also angry that the FBI had not warned them about the potential for arson against the Harrington Manufacturing Company buildings.

== Works cited ==
- Lawless, Joseph S. (2012). Prosecutorial Misconduct: Law, Procedure, Forms (fourth ed.). Matthew Bender & Company. ISBN 9781422422137.
