= Hiawatha, Kansas =

City in Brown County, Kansas

- City and County seat
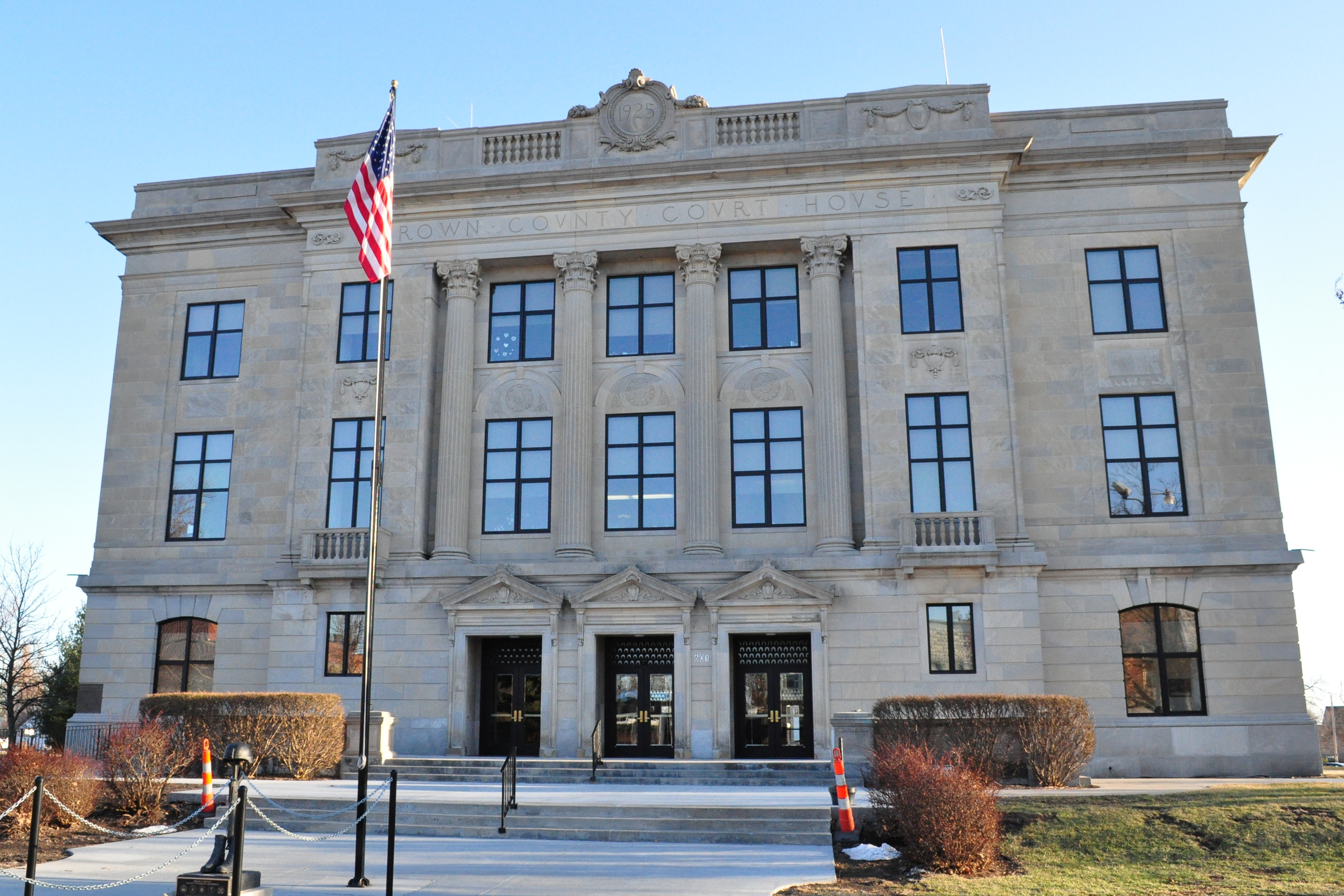
- Brown County Court House (2011)

- Location within Brown County and Kansas

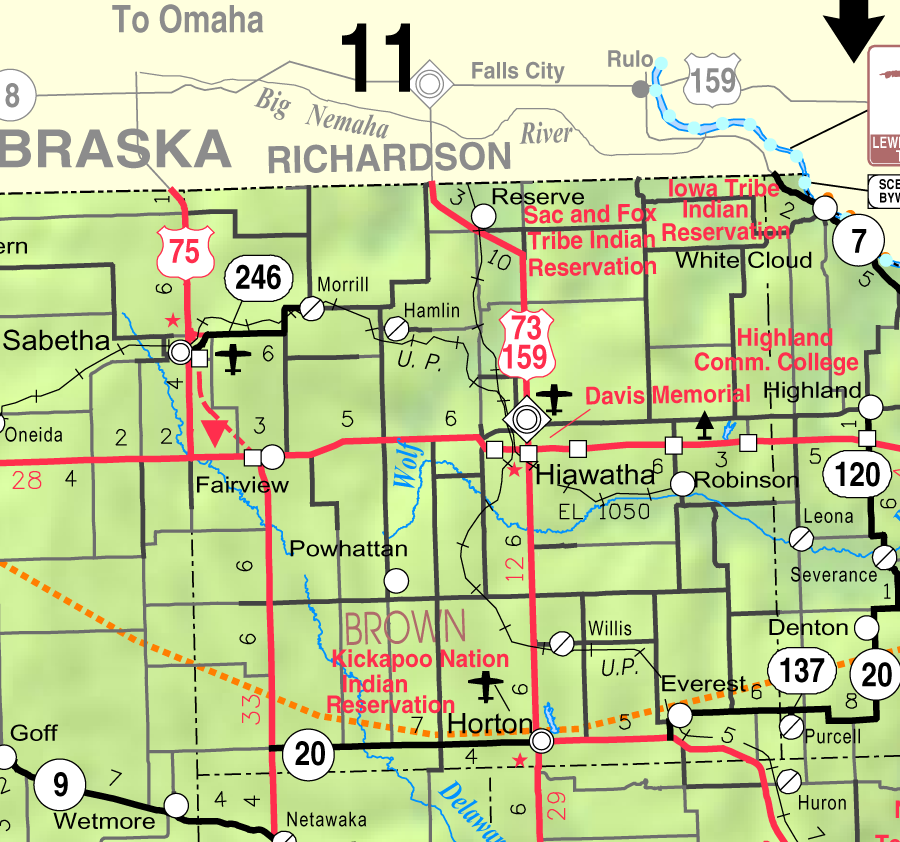
- KDOT map of Brown County (legend)
- Coordinates: 39°51′06″N 95°32′17″W
- Country: United States
- State: Kansas
- County: Brown
- Founded: 1857
- Incorporated: 1857
- Named for: The Song of Hiawatha

Government
  - Mayor: Becky Shamburg

Area
  - Total: 2.59 sq mi (6.71 km^{2})
  - Land: 2.59 sq mi (6.71 km^{2})
  - Water: 0 sq mi (0.00 km^{2})
- Elevation: 1,122 ft (342 m)

Population (2020)
  - Total: 3,280
  - Density: 1,270/sq mi (489/km^{2})
- Time zone: UTC-6 (CST)
  - Summer (DST): UTC-5 (CDT)
- ZIP Code: 66434
- Area code: 785
- FIPS code: 20-31675
- GNIS ID: 485591
- Website: cityofhiawatha.org

Hiawatha (Ioway: Hári Wáta, pronounced [haːꜜɾi waːꜜtʰɐ]) is the largest city in and the county seat of Brown County, Kansas, United States. As of the 2020 census, the population of the city was 3,280.

== History ==
=== Etymology ===
B.L. Rider reportedly was responsible for naming Hiawatha, taking the young Indian's name from Henry Wadsworth Longfellow's poem, The Song of Hiawatha. In the poem is legendary Onondaga and Mohawk Indian leader Hiawatha. Adjacent to the former Ioway-Sac reservation and the present-day Ioway Tribe of Kansas and Nebraska, Hiawatha is called Hári Wáta in Ioway, meaning "I am looking far away".

=== 19th century ===
Hiawatha was founded in 1857, making it one of the oldest towns in the state. John M. Coe, John P. Wheller, and Thomas J. Drummond were instrumental in organizing the city, and the site was staked out February 17, 1857. Hiawatha became the Brown County Seat in 1858, and the first school opened in 1870.

The main street was designated Oregon Street after the Oregon Trail. Parallel streets north of it were named after Indian tribes north of the Trail, and streets south carried tribal names of those south of the Trail.

=== 20th century ===
The city is home to the longest running continuous Halloween parade in the nation, starting in 1914.

According to The New York Times in 2012, "the cartoonist Bob Montana inked the original likenesses of Archie and his pals and plopped them in an idyllic Midwestern community named Riverdale because Mr. [John] Goldwater, a New Yorker, had fond memories of time spent in Hiawatha" Goldwater had hitchhiked to the community at the age of 17 and started working at the Hiawatha Daily World.

== Geography ==
According to the United States Census Bureau, the city has a total area of 2.59 square miles (6.71 km^{2}), all land.

=== Climate ===
According to the Köppen Climate Classification system, Hiawatha has a hot-summer humid continental climate, abbreviated "Dfa" on climate maps.

Climate data for Hiawatha, Kansas, 1991–2020 normals, extremes 1948–present
Month	Jan	Feb	Mar	Apr	May	Jun	Jul	Aug	Sep	Oct	Nov	Dec	Year
Record high °F (°C)	73 (23)	77 (25)	88 (31)	97 (36)	98 (37)	102 (39)	104 (40)	104 (40)	104 (40)	89 (32)	80 (27)	73 (23)	104 (40)
Mean daily maximum °F (°C)	36.2 (2.3)	41.9 (5.5)	53.2 (11.8)	64.3 (17.9)	73.9 (23.3)	83.2 (28.4)	87.3 (30.7)	85.9 (29.9)	78.9 (26.1)	67.5 (19.7)	52.8 (11.6)	40.6 (4.8)	63.8 (17.7)
Daily mean °F (°C)	25.7 (−3.5)	30.6 (−0.8)	41.0 (5.0)	52.4 (11.3)	63.3 (17.4)	73.0 (22.8)	76.8 (24.9)	74.6 (23.7)	66.4 (19.1)	54.7 (12.6)	41.6 (5.3)	30.5 (−0.8)	52.6 (11.4)
Mean daily minimum °F (°C)	15.1 (−9.4)	19.2 (−7.1)	28.7 (−1.8)	40.4 (4.7)	52.6 (11.4)	62.7 (17.1)	66.3 (19.1)	63.3 (17.4)	54.0 (12.2)	41.8 (5.4)	30.3 (−0.9)	20.4 (−6.4)	41.2 (5.1)
Record low °F (°C)	−16 (−27)	−21 (−29)	−2 (−19)	17 (−8)	30 (−1)	43 (6)	49 (9)	44 (7)	31 (−1)	22 (−6)	6 (−14)	−10 (−23)	−21 (−29)
Average precipitation inches (mm)	0.77 (20)	1.15 (29)	2.01 (51)	3.58 (91)	4.83 (123)	5.03 (128)	4.46 (113)	3.86 (98)	3.22 (82)	2.86 (73)	1.72 (44)	1.22 (31)	34.71 (883)
Average snowfall inches (cm)	4.7 (12)	4.1 (10)	2.2 (5.6)	1.1 (2.8)	0.0 (0.0)	0.0 (0.0)	0.0 (0.0)	0.0 (0.0)	0.0 (0.0)	0.0 (0.0)	1.2 (3.0)	3.6 (9.1)	16.9 (42.5)
Average precipitation days (≥ 0.01 in)	5.2	5.0	7.9	10.5	10.6	9.9	9.5	8.6	7.3	7.2	5.5	5.3	92.5
Average snowy days (≥ 0.1 in)	2.6	2.3	1.2	0.4	0.0	0.0	0.0	0.0	0.0	0.0	0.8	2.1	9.4
Source 1: NOAA
Source 2: National Weather Service

== Demographics ==
Historical population
Census	Pop.	Note	%±
1880	1,375		—
1890	2,486		80.8%
1900	2,829		13.8%
1910	2,974		5.1%
1920	3,222		8.3%
1930	3,302		2.5%
1940	3,238		−1.9%
1950	3,294		1.7%
1960	3,391		2.9%
1970	3,365		−0.8%
1980	3,702		10.0%
1990	3,603		−2.7%
2000	3,417		−5.2%
2010	3,172		−7.2%
2020	3,280		3.4%
U.S. Decennial Census

=== 2020 census ===
As of the 2020 census, Hiawatha had 3,280 people, 1,378 households, and 798 families. The population density was 1,281.8 inhabitants per square mile (494.9/km^{2}). There were 1,590 housing units at an average density of 621.3 per square mile (239.9/km^{2}).

The median age was 41.4 years. 24.6% of residents were under the age of 18, 6.3% were from 18 to 24, 22.8% were from 25 to 44, 24.1% were from 45 to 64, and 22.2% were 65 years of age or older. For every 100 females there were 89.7 males, and for every 100 females age 18 and over there were 86.3 males. 0.0% of residents lived in urban areas and 100.0% lived in rural areas.

Of the 1,378 households, 27.7% had children under the age of 18 living in them. Of all households, 43.5% were married-couple households, 17.7% were households with a male householder and no spouse or partner present, and 32.6% were households with a female householder and no spouse or partner present. About 37.0% of all households were made up of individuals and 18.1% had someone living alone who was 65 years of age or older. Of the 1,590 housing units, 13.3% were vacant. The homeowner vacancy rate was 5.6% and the rental vacancy rate was 9.7%.

Racial composition as of the 2020 census
Race	Number	Percent
White	2,807	85.6%
Black or African American	60	1.8%
American Indian and Alaska Native	84	2.6%
Asian	27	0.8%
Native Hawaiian and Other Pacific Islander	1	0.0%
Some other race	49	1.5%
Two or more races	252	7.7%
Hispanic or Latino (of any race)	144	4.4%

The non-Hispanic White population was 84.2% (2,762).

=== Demographic estimates ===
The average household size was 2.4 and the average family size was 3.0. The percent of those with a bachelor's degree or higher was estimated to be 14.2% of the population.

=== Income and poverty ===
The 2016–2020 5-year American Community Survey estimates show that the median household income was $48,040 (with a margin of error of +/- $7,412) and the median family income was $63,355 (+/- $11,117). Males had a median income of $33,856 (+/- $3,686) versus $22,344 (+/- $6,652) for females. The median income for those above 16 years old was $30,434 (+/- $3,284). Approximately, 4.9% of families and 11.4% of the population were below the poverty line, including 10.6% of those under the age of 18 and 4.7% of those ages 65 or over.

=== 2010 census ===
As of the census of 2010, there were 3,172 people, 1,369 households, and 843 families residing in the city. The population density was 1,224.7 inhabitants per square mile (472.9/km^{2}). There were 1,588 housing units at an average density of 613.1 per square mile (236.7/km^{2}). The racial makeup of the city was 89.6% White, 2.3% African American, 2.9% Native American, 0.3% Asian, 1.2% from other races, and 3.8% from two or more races. Hispanic or Latino of any race were 3.9% of the population.

There were 1,369 households, of which 30.4% had children under the age of 18 living with them, 45.2% were married couples living together, 12.0% had a female householder with no husband present, 4.4% had a male householder with no wife present, and 38.4% were non-families. 34.3% of all households were made up of individuals, and 16.2% had someone living alone who was 65 years of age or older. The average household size was 2.27 and the average family size was 2.85.

The median age in the city was 42.6 years. 24.1% of residents were under the age of 18; 6.7% were between the ages of 18 and 24; 21.7% were from 25 to 44; 26.4% were from 45 to 64; and 21.1% were 65 years of age or older. The gender makeup of the city was 46.4% male and 53.6% female.

== Tourist attractions ==
Davis Memorial

The Davis Memorial is a monument in the Mount Hope Cemetery, built by John Milburn Davis in honor of his wife Sarah after her death. Begun soon after her death in 1930 and completed in 1934, the monument consists of statues of the couple and a small shelter, carved from Italian marble. Its cost (approximately $200,000) led many in the community to criticize Davis for his free spending during the Great Depression. Today, the monument benefits the community financially because of the thousands of tourists who visit it. The memorial was added to the National Register of Historic Places in 1977.

City clock

701 Oregon Street; downtown area

This is the only such clock between Indianapolis and Denver on U.S. Route 36. It was built in 1891 as part of the First National Bank building and is listed on the Kansas Register.

Brown County Historical Museum

611 Utah Street, South of Brown County Courthouse Square

It is owned and operated by the Brown County Historical Society. This building is listed in the National Register of Historic Places.

Brown County Ag Museum

301 E. Iowa Street, West of Davis Memorial

It resembles a 1900 farmstead with a paved windmill trail for sightseers and joggers to use and enjoy. There is a log cabin replica that is the office, wash house, barn, brooder house, corn crib, cabinet shop, horse drawn implement building, antique tractor building and many windmills and wind chargers.

== Leisure ==
Hiawatha City Lake is a tree-shaded, seven-acre impoundment a mile south of the city, popular for picnicking and camping.

Baseball and softball parks

- Bruning Park, in west Hiawatha, has three main fields: two for baseball and one for softball. Other fields are available, but are not managed. Bruning Park also has a concession stand and a small playground. The park is also home to soccer.
- Noble Park is a recent addition in Hiawatha that lies just south of the aquatic park. Deemed as one of the most premier Legion fields in the state, Hiawatha has been host to Zone and State Legion baseball tournaments. This is American Legion Post #66's home field. The park has a concession stand, batting cage, and playground. Every year, the Leo Tritsch Memorial Tournament is held at Noble Park.
- The Hiawatha Middle School softball field is home to Hiawatha High School softball practices and some games. The field lies between the middle school and the Fisher Community Center.

== Government ==
The city is governed by a 5-member commission. As of May 16, 2023, the City of Hiawatha website has only three commissioners listed. The commissioners of finance, police and utilities.

- Mayor: Becky Shamburg
- City Administrator: Brad Scott

== Education ==
The community is served by Hiawatha USD 415 public school district.

=== Hiawatha High School ===
Hiawatha High School (HHS) teaches grades 9-12, and is located at 600 Red Hawk Drive. Their mascot is the Red Hawks (changed from Redskins after 2000), and the school colors are red and blue.

The campus lies on the far east side of Hiawatha. The architecture is in circular form, with a domed circular gym nicknamed "The Roundhouse." The classrooms are connected in "pods."

"West Campus" is a separate set of buildings for agricultural and industrial arts classes. Memorial Stadium lies north of the school and a prairie trail area and practice field is east of the main school.

In athletics, HHS is class 3A, and has won two girls basketball state championships in 1978 and 1979, a state football championship in 1980, and a girls cross country state championship in 2017. The Red Hawks are a member of the Big 7 League, with a total of eight teams in northeast Kansas. Athletics include football, volleyball, boys' and girls' cross country, boys' and girls' basketball, power lifting, boys' and girls' track and field, softball, baseball, boys' golf, and Scholar's Bowl.

Other activities and organizations include cheerleading, Color Guard, Dance Team, journalism, Yearbook, Gifted-Talented Program, National Honor Society, Red Hawk Club, Kansas Association for Youth, International Club, Student Council, Red Hawk Reader's Club, Biology Club (travels to the Bahamas annually), National FFA Organization, Business Professionals of America, Family, Career and Community Leaders of America, and Fellowship of Christian Athletes. The school has a greenhouse at West Campus and a weightroom.

=== Hiawatha Middle School ===
- Grades 5-8
- Located at 307 S. Morrill Avenue
- Mascot: Red Hawks (changed from Warriors after 2000)
- Colors: Red & Blue (changed from Burgundy & White after 2008)

HMS was erected in 2000 after moving from Robinson Middle School in Robinson, Kansas. The school lies on the east side of Hiawatha, just south of the high school. The school is divided into 4 sections, by grade level. HMS has an advanced Life Skills technology classroom and a modern gym. There is a Gifted-Talented program along with Title Math and Reading. There is a softball field to the south of the school and a practice field and track west of the school. The Hiawatha Hawks are a member of the Big 7 League, with a total of six teams in northeast Kansas. Athletics include cross country, football, volleyball, wrestling, boys' and girls' basketball, and track and field. Scholars' Bowl and gymnastics are also available.

=== Hiawatha Elementary School ===
- Grades K-4
- Located at 600 Miami Street
- Mascot: Red Hawks (Changed from Braves after 2000)

HES is in north central Hiawatha and has been for many years. The school starts kids out in Kindergarten and graduates them after 4th grade. The school is divided into halls for each grade level. HES has many school programs including Title Reading, Speech, Gifted-Talented, and Extended Learning. The playground is modern with new fitness equipment for children.

=== Mascot ===
In December 2000, the Hiawatha USD 415 School District voted 4-3 to eliminate the American Indian mascots from the schools. The high school had the nickname 'Redskins', similar to 'Indians' when the school was in its early years. The middle school was the 'Warriors' and the elementary school, the 'Braves'.

The District received much praise for its transition, including the National Congress of American Indians and organizations as far away as Washington, D.C. After narrowing down many potential new nicknames, the high school decided to retain its red pride, renaming itself the 'Red Hawks'. The middle school obtained the name 'Hawks' and the elementary school, 'Junior Hawks'.

== Media ==
- KNZA 103.9 - FM station with a country music radio format including local news, weather and sports.
- The Hiawatha World - weekly newspaper.
- Penny Press - newspaper classifieds publication

== Notable people ==
- Bion Barnett - banker
- Al Buell - pinup artist
- William Gallagher - 1953 Pulitzer Prize-winning photographer
- John Goldwater - cofounder / editor / co-publisher of Archie Comics, news reporter when he lived in Hiawatha
- Bill Martin, Jr. - children's book author
- Homer McCrerey - commissioned US Naval Academy officer and bioengineering oceanographer
- John McLendon - inducted into Basketball Hall of Fame in 1979
- Betty Neale - Colorado politician
- Joe Wilhoit - baseball player, record holder for longest consecutive game hitting streak in professional baseball (69)
- Tod D. Wolters - retired United States Air Force four-star general, Supreme Allied Commander, Europe, veteran of Persian Gulf and Afghan wars.
