= Border Belt Independent =

American online newspaper

The Border Belt Independent (BBI) is an American online newspaper that covers issues in the North Carolina Border Belt, an area comprising Scotland, Robeson, Columbus, and Bladen counties. It is overseen by the nonprofit Border Belt Reporting Center, Inc., a 501-C-3

== History ==
In the 2010s, Les High, the editor of The News Reporter, a print newspaper based in Whiteville, North Carolina, considered creating a nonprofit news center to cover affairs in several counties in southeastern North Carolina. Following a feasibility study by the North Carolina Local News Lab and after receiving a $495,000 grant from the Kate B. Reynolds Charitable Trust, High incorporated the nonprofit Border Belt Reporting Center in April 2021. The Border Belt Independent, its publication, began operating in May 2021.

== Structure and coverage ==
High serves as the president of the Border Belt Independent's board of directors. It is edited by Sarah Nagem and has two additional full-time reporters. The BBI covers news in Scotland, Robeson, Columbus, and Bladen counties, four of the poorest counties in North Carolina. It allows other regional newspapers to republish its reporting. All content is free and the BBI accepts no advertising. It is primarily funded by the Kate B. Reynolds Charitable Trust, which renewed the initial three-year grant for another three years, Press Forward, plus contributions and matching funds from INN NewsMatch. In February, 2025, the BBI entered into an agreement with The Assembly, a statewide news organization based in Raleigh, to oversee many of the BBI's editorial, business office and IT functions.
