= Tabor City, North Carolina =

Town in the United States

- Town
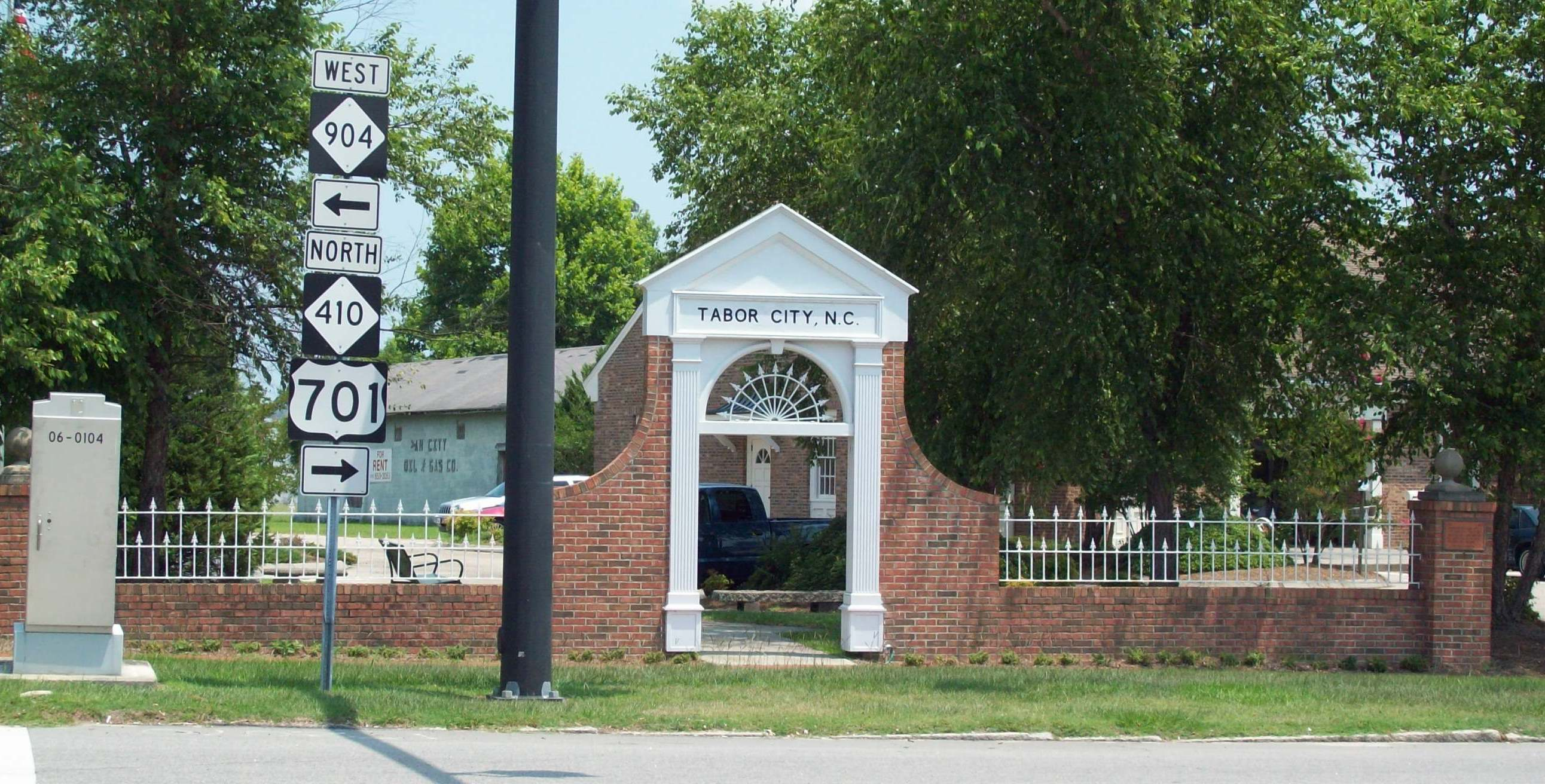
- Tabor City Welcome Arch

- Flag Seal

- Location within the state of North Carolina
- Coordinates: 34°09′14″N 78°52′26″W
- Country: United States
- State: North Carolina
- County: Columbus

Government
  - Mayor: Royce Harper

Area
  - Total: 3.37 sq mi (8.72 km^{2})
  - Land: 3.36 sq mi (8.71 km^{2})
  - Water: 0.0039 sq mi (0.01 km^{2})
- Elevation: 102 ft (31 m)

Population (2020)
  - Total: 3,781
  - Density: 1,124.5/sq mi (434.17/km^{2})
- Time zone: UTC-5 (Eastern (EST))
  - Summer (DST): UTC-4 (EDT)
- ZIP code: 28463
- Area codes: 910, 472
- FIPS code: 37-66520
- GNIS feature ID: 2406708
- Website: townoftaborcity.org

Tabor City (/ˈteɪbɜːr/ TAY-bur) is a town in Columbus County, North Carolina, United States. It is the southernmost town in the county. It is located just north of the North Carolina/South Carolina line, about 39 miles (63 km) north of Myrtle Beach, South Carolina, and is just north of Loris, South Carolina. As of the 2020 census, Tabor City had a population of 3,781.

== History ==
=== Pre-European ===
According to Swanton (1952), before the arrival of the Europeans, the area was home to the Cape Fear Indians, the Waccamaw Indians, and the Saponas.

=== 1670s–1830s ===
During the Revolutionary War, men from the area joined with the rebels in the Battle of Brown Marsh. The Loyalists won, marking the high point of their efforts to defeat the revolution in the southern theater. Men from the area may have also aided the American forces in the Battle of Moore's Creek Bridge, which had a much more favorable outcome for the Americans. The Siege of Charleston saw troops from the coastal Carolinas unsuccessfully defend the city from the British.

Early settlers in the area farmed, raised cattle & pigs, and manufactured naval stores. From the longleaf pine trees come products used in shipbuilding. These products or "stores" are turpentine, rosin, tar and pitch. Pitch was needed to coat the hulls of ships to protect them in tropical waters.

Camp meetings filled an ecclesiastical and spiritual need in the unchurched settlements. The Honey Camp meeting site (which became the Green Sea Baptist Church) was one of the first large camp meetings in the region at nearby Green Sea, South Carolina. Population increased and settlement moved inland, which led to the founding of a congregation in the area just north of the state border. Around 1837, the congregation of Mt. Tabor Baptist Church erected their first building, constructed of logs.

=== 1830s–1930s ===
The original community took its name from the first prominent church in the area, the Mount Tabor Baptist Church(now the Tabor City Baptist Church), which itself is named after the biblical Mount Tabor, and was founded in 1838. A village coalesced around the area of the church which was organized as a town shortly after 1840. The town officially incorporated in 1904. The church was originally located near the intersection of what is now Stake Road and East 5th Street.

Business activity started in Tabor City by the mid-1850s, with the development of a saw mill, turpentine still, grocery store and dry goods store. The Atlantic Coast Line Railroad located a station in the town in 1886. The turpentine industry was huge in the area throughout the 19th Century. Many wagonloads of turpentine, rosin and pitch were carried to the rail station in Grist, NC, for shipment to Wilmington, North Carolina and other environs. The town was officially incorporated in 1905. In 1906, William Fowler donated land for the Tabor City Baptist Church, at the site which has been in continuous use since the completion of the construction and is still currently in use, as of April 2023. The new church and sanctuary was completed in 1908.

Mt. Tabor residents were greatly affected by the American Civil War. Many volunteered when the war began and many more were conscripted to fill the ranks as the war decimated the combatants. Men from the area were mainly in two different groups. At war's beginning, eager young men joined Capt. John B. Stanly's Co.(Columbus Guards # 4), 10th Regt NC Infantry (Volunteers), which became Co D, 20th North Carolina Infantry Regiment, NC State Troops, which participated in most of the major battles in the Virginia theater. At Gettysburg, Pennsylvania, more than sixty-five percent of the regiment were casualties, either from wounds or death. Older men were later conscripted into Co. G, 51st NC Infantry Regiment, which performed garrison duty at forts in the Charleston, South Carolina area and Fort Fisher. It also saw limited action in several of the campaigns in eastern Virginia. Townsmen participated in most of the large battles of the Eastern Theater of the war, fighting in the Carolinas and Virginia. In 1865, William T. Sherman's army passed through the area, with outriders foraging for foodstuffs and supplies. The blue columns crossed the Pee Dee River, the Lumber River, and the Cape Fear River, with the cavalry scouting ahead. Mt. Tabor was not spared by Sherman's foragers. Dozens of men never returned home. Widow's weeds were a common sight in this area. Census records in 1870 and 1880 show many households run by widows in South Williams Township.

Strawberries became an important crop in the 1880s when the development of the railroad enabled them to be shipped to markets in the big cities. The Anderson Shingle Company made shipping containers for strawberries. In 1910, Bishop Anderson sold out to W.B. Roberts and David James (Dave) Hughes, three years later Dave Hughes bought out Mr. Robert's interest and it became D.J. Hughes & Company "Manufacturers of Anderson Make Strawberry, Cantaloupe, Peach and Grape Crates, Boxes Made to Order, and Lumber," with a yearly output of 150,000 crates.

Cotton fell out of favor when boll weevils negatively impacted crop production. Tobacco became the golden crop and the Border Belt produced prime flue-cured leaf for tobacco companies around the world. The first tobacco warehouse was built in 1909, which became a major industry for both the town and the surrounding area. By 1925, the town had several tobacco auction warehouses, two tobacco re-drying warehouses, and a tobacco prizery(a packing plant where tobacco was packed into hogsheads for shipment to tobacco companies in Virginia), all within a block of the railroad tracks. The dominance of tobacco in the community continued until the 1990s. By 2022, only a few largescale farmers still grow tobacco in the area.

The First World War took men from the town and deposited them in the trenches of France where they helped the Allied Forces achieve victory against the Central Powers.

Originally named 'Mt. Tabor', many would shorten the name to 'Tabor' when writing correspondence. With mail delivery by the USPS, Tabor would be confused with Tarboro, North Carolina due to the similarities in spelling. By 1935, US Postal authorities demanded a name change and since Tarboro was much larger, Mt Tabor was told to pick another name. The town denizens picked Tabor City as they expected phenomenal growth for the future of this tiny village.

In May 1925, there were no paved streets, no fire department, nor a municipal water supply. Businesses included: a crate factory, several tobacco industries, a power plant, churches, train station, US Post Office, a hotel, a telephone exchange, many businesses, a prizery(tobacco packing house), agricultural, commercial, and industrial warehouses, a grist mill, a concert hall, and schools. Tobacco was the main industry.

During the later 1920s, a boarding house opened, often the choice of traveling businessmen, tobacco buyers, and hunters. The owner of the business, would cook for her guests, leaving the pots on the stove for the boarders to serve themselves. A night's stay, including supper and breakfast was $2.00 per day. The business was operated by the family for three generations. The original buildings burned in 1971 and were rebuilt, operating with monthly rental units and a restaurant until 2018. It is now an event venue under new owners.

By February 1934, the face of downtown was formed. A modern-day person would recognize many familiar buildings that appear on the Sanborn Fire Insurance Co. maps of the town for that year. There was a municipal-owned water source from a deep well. A 75,000 gal elevated water tank on a 75 ft steel tower rose above the town. There was one mile of 6" & 8" water lines, giving 45 lbs of domestic & fire water pressure. Businesses noted on those maps included: factories, commercial, and agricultural warehouses, churches, many commercial enterprises, schools, movie theatre, US Post Office, a town hall, a waterworks plant & water tower. Tobacco was the main industry.

=== 1940s–1970s ===
The Second World War saw many young men of the town face combat in both the European and Pacific Theaters of war. The war economy brought prosperity to the town and saw an expansion of new businesses began by war veterans taking advantage of GI Bill loan provisions. During the 1940s and 1950s, the area had at least two movie theaters. There were also several drive-in movie businesses. Gas stations appeared at the town's major intersections. The first supermarkets also opened replacing the smaller general stores that had previously served the public. Several car dealerships came to the town. The first Yam Festival was organized and held in 1948.

The Tabor City Tribune is a weekly newspaper established by W. Horace Carter (a Stanly County native) in 1946. In 1950, after witnessing a Ku Klux Klan motorcade going through town, Carter began writing a series of editorials and reports critical of Klan activity. The Klan began a recruiting campaign in 1950, and were later convicted of flogging people and other offenses, based largely on Carter's work. Along with the Whiteville News Reporter, the Tribune was awarded the 1953 Pulitzer Prize for Public Service for its editorials against the Ku Klux Klan. The Pulitzer Prize citation stated that the newspapers were awarded the prize "for their successful campaign against the Ku Klux Klan, waged on their own doorstep at the risk of economic loss and personal danger, culminating in the conviction of over one hundred Klansmen and an end to terrorism in their communities." The newspapers were the first weeklies to win a Pulitzer Prize. The name of the Tabor City Tribune was changed to the Tabor-Loris Tribune in 1996. The small W. Horace Carter Newspaper Museum in Tabor City at the Tabor-Loris Tribune offices has exhibits on Carter's life and work. A documentary of the struggles between Carter and the Klan, titled The Editor and the Dragon: Horace Carter Fights the Klan, was shown on the North Carolina Public Broadcasting System in 2013, on the 50th anniversary of the struggle. In addition, part of Carter's story was entered into the Congressional Record in 2007. Carter's death in 2009 was noted in The New York Times. Even with the Tribune's crusade against racism and the Klan, now in 2022, there is a business covered with Confederate flags which sells Klan and other racist merchandise on the main road coming into town. Thus, the battle against racism is at a stalemate in light of Carter's crusade in the 1950s.

The Tabor City Methodist Church began services in 1953.

Due to crimes in the area in the late 1950s and 1960s, especially fights at local bars, Tabor City earned the nickname "Razor City". Even though many of the crimes occurred just across the border in South Carolina, the Razor/Tabor near-rhyme stuck.

An economic downturn and severe recession, plus skyrocketing fuel costs, in the early/mid-1970s resulted in business closures and poverty becoming the norm for many families.

=== 1980s–2010 ===
By the eighties, tobacco use began declining. Along with global recession, the town and its people took another severe hit. More businesses closed and parts of downtown looked deserted as empty buildings fell into disrepair. Tens of millions in US government grants poured into the city beginning in the mid-1980s until present day. The decline in Tabor City was similar to neighboring towns of Fair Bluff, North Carolina, Broadman, North Carolina, Brunswick, North Carolina, Cerro Gordo, North Carolina, and Chadbourn, North Carolina. A town manager was hired to handle administrative duties of the town,

The year 1984, saw a group of townspeople come together to promote economic development in the town. An investment fund was accumulated through donations. Several projects were completed over the following decades. Most projects have seen the group acquire properties which end up receiving multimillion-dollar government grants.

The dismissal of Police Chief Willie Gore in 1993 sparked a period of weekly protest marches since many felt the chief's dismissal was racist in nature. The marches were peaceful, though overreaction by the all white police force led to the mostly African American crowd being met with pepper spray on multiple occasions.

In late 1997, a massive facelift was performed on two blocks of S. Main Street in the downtown area. Southern Living magazine made contact with town leaders about an article they were doing about Christmas celebrations in small southern towns. For many decades, the town traditionally held an annual daytime Christmas parade. Storefronts were painted, new retro lampposts installed, and other aesthetic improvements costing tens of thousands of dollars were made in order to have a nighttime Christmas parade. A photo of the parade and short write-up were included in an article in the December 1997 issue of Southern Living magazine.

Today, the town focuses on agriculture, light manufacturing, retail and tourism. In addition, a large state prison provides many jobs for the area. Being so close to the coastal areas of Myrtle Beach and the Brunswick County beaches has led to a growth in the area housing industry.

The Centennial Clock celebrating the town's 100th anniversary was installed on Main Street. It was donated by a local business leader. The Freedom Flag Trilogy, which is located at the entrance to town on Hwy 701N, was first flown July 4, 2007.

=== 2011–present ===
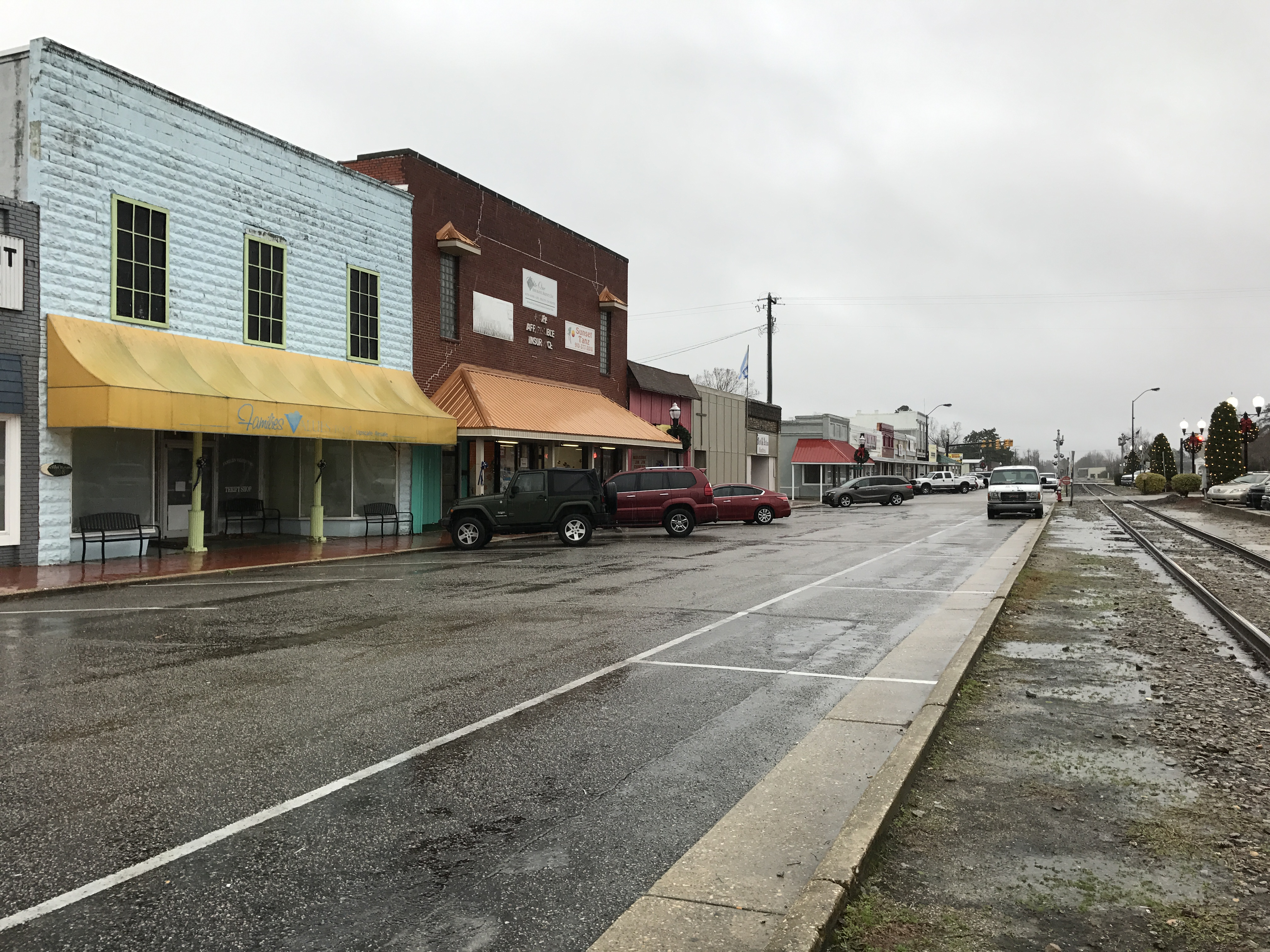
Tabor City in 2018

A local citizen donated the lot containing the ruined front brick wall of the former Ritz theater to the town. Millions in government grants resulted in a complete rebuild effort that was completed in 2014. The former theater is now the Ritz Center, a community center for the arts. The mayor of the town has a comedy act that is a frequent performer. The building sits empty for much of the year.

In 2014, the Chapel Hill, North Carolina band, Campfires and Constellations, memorialized the town in their song about drug smuggling, "Fast Burn to Tabor City".

On October 25, 2018, it was announced the Todd House would close after 100 years of operation.

Town welcome signs were amended in 2019 to recognize country music legend Stonewall Jackson, a Tabor City native.

In 2019, town leaders continued to develop a plan for a light rail link from the town to Myrtle Beach, South Carolina tourists via Conway. A matter to be addressed is how to get beach tourists to Conway in order to use the rail service. The Town Depot project, renamed the Community Center, is being built adjacent to the railroad tracks behind the town library. Community Center construction began in 2021 and is scheduled to be completed in April 2022. Myrtle Beach city leaders are busy converting their railroad corridor to a 2.5 mile public trail for pedestrians and bikes

== Climate ==
Tabor City has a humid subtropical climate (Köppen Cfa), with the following characteristics:

Winters are generally mild with January highs in the mid 50s °F (11–14 °C) and lows in the mid 30s °F (1–3 °C). Snowfall does not occur in most years, and when it does, is generally light.

Spring is reasonably lengthy, beginning in late February and lasting to early May. The presence of abundant dense vegetation in the area causes significant pollen dusting in the springtime that tends to turn rooftops and cars yellow.

Summer brings high humidity with temperatures usually in the upper 80s to lower 90s °F (31–34 °C). Heat indices can easily break the 100 °F (38 °C) mark, though the actual temperature does not in most years. Due to the proximity of warm Atlantic Ocean waters, the area may be hit by a hurricane during the summer, at an average of once every seven years- although most are of a low level. About 40% of the annual rainfall is delivered from July to September.

Autumn is also generally humid at the beginning, with the same tropical threats from hurricanes as in the summer. Some of the deciduous trees may lose their leaves; however most trees in the area are evergreens and therefore remain green year-round.

== Culture ==
The North Carolina Visitors Center in the middle of town, on business highway 701, assists tourist and locals with these and other activities. The visitor center underwent a series of improvements, funded partially by a $100,000 North Carolina Department of Transportation allocation. As of 2022, the volume of visitors to the center is minuscule.

The North Carolina Yam Festival takes place on the fourth Saturday in October. The festival celebrates with crafts, train rides, classic cars and trucks, arts and vendors. Also during the Yam festival, an annual art show is held, and a "Miss Yam Festival" pageant is held for various age groups. The annual parade is considered a highlight of the festival.

Based somewhat on the success of the fall Yam Festival, an annual spring festival, the Spring Fling, began in 2013, celebrating the Town and people of the area. This week-long festival offers several activities.

Lake Tabor is a one-star rated, 2 acre lake where boating events are often held. Lake Tabor went dry in 1998 after hurricane floods destroyed the retention dam. The dam was rebuilt and the lake restored. It was closed for a part of the 2013, and 2014 summer due to algae infestations. The Lake Tabor dam is still in danger during hurricane flooding events.

The area boasts several restaurants and shops, and Tabor City has several parks and athletic fields as part of the Columbus County Parks and Recreation Department. A business in town offers access to batting cages. Hunting and fishing are popular activities, as well as the over 100 golf courses within 40 miles (64 km) of the town. A local campground has a small waterpark. A Fourth of July festival celebrating both past and current military personnel is held annually, with fireworks, food, and other activities. There is normally no charge for this event.

An old train depot today serves as a small museum that operates primarily during the Yam Festival. A retired caboose is one of the displays available for exploration.

== Demographics ==
Historical population
Census	Pop.	Note	%±
1910	418		—
1920	782		87.1%
1930	1,165		49.0%
1940	1,552		33.2%
1950	2,033		31.0%
1960	2,338		15.0%
1970	2,400		2.7%
1980	2,710		12.9%
1990	2,330		−14.0%
2000	2,509		7.7%
2010	2,511		0.1%
2020	3,781		50.6%
U.S. Decennial Census

=== 2020 census ===
As of the 2020 census, Tabor City had a population of 3,781, with 1,084 households and 617 families. The median age was 39.6 years. 14.5% of residents were under the age of 18 and 14.9% were 65 years of age or older. For every 100 females, there were 190.8 males, and for every 100 females age 18 and over, there were 213.6 males age 18 and over.

Of households in Tabor City, 29.2% had children under the age of 18 living in them. Of all households, 30.7% were married-couple households, 21.9% were households with a male householder and no spouse or partner present, and 43.2% were households with a female householder and no spouse or partner present. About 39.7% of all households were made up of individuals, and 21.4% had someone living alone who was 65 years of age or older.

There were 1,232 housing units, of which 12.0% were vacant. The homeowner vacancy rate was 1.4% and the rental vacancy rate was 7.5%. 0.0% of residents lived in urban areas, while 100.0% lived in rural areas.

Tabor City racial composition
Race	Number	Percentage
White (non-Hispanic)	1,723	45.57%
Black or African American (non-Hispanic)	1,737	45.94%
Native American	36	0.95%
Asian	21	0.56%
Other/Mixed	104	2.75%
Hispanic or Latino	160	4.23%

=== 2010 census ===
As of the United States census of 2010, there were 2,511 people, 1,095 households, and 627 families residing in the town. The population density was 852.2 inhabitants per square mile (329.0/km^{2}). There were 1,239 housing units at an average density of 379.1 per square mile (146.4/km^{2}). The racial makeup of the town was 59.2% White, 36.2% African American, 1.1% Native American, 0.02% Asian, 0.0% Pacific Islander, 1.5% from other races, and 1.8% from two or more races. Hispanic or Latino ethnicity were 2.3% of the population. Of the 1,095 households, 23% had children under the age of 18 living with them, 33.5% were married couples living together, 17.6% had a female householder with no husband present, and 42.7% were non-families. 28.2% of all households were made up of individuals, and 14.2% had someone living alone who was 65 years of age or older. The average household size was 2.24 and the average family size was 2.99. The town has shown marked growth in the last 14 years. In the town, the population was spread out, with .4.2% under the age of 18, 5.7% from 20 to 24, 21.3% from 25 to 44, 29.4% from 45 to 64, and 19.3% who were 65 years of age or older. The median age was 44 years. The median income for a household in the town was $25,469, and the median income for a family was $40,044. Males had a median income of $32,528 versus $20,804 for females. The per capita income for the town was $17,922. About 16.9% of families and 21.60% of the population were below the poverty line, including 23.7% of those under age 18 and 22.5% of those age 65 or over.

== Economic conditions ==
Since the 1970s, Tabor City has been beset by poverty and high unemployment, especially as the agricultural based economy of the past was no longer viable. Today, the town focuses on agriculture, light manufacturing, retail and tourism. A large state prison provides many jobs for the area. The town is served by two grocery stores, three drug stores, a number of restaurants, three banks and a credit union. Overall, the town has seen a steady decline in the commercial sector over the past 30 odd years. The downtown was thriving through the eighties, and since then it has seen vacant storefronts become more common, with dilapidated buildings throughout the downtown area. Poor city planning has industrial sites scattered throughout the small town with all residents impacted by heavy commercial and industrial traffic. This has significantly impacted residential property values throughout the town. The Tabor City Chamber of Commerce maintains a both a Facebook presence and its own website. The town has also upgraded its water, sewer and roads, in hopes of attracting new businesses but little has materialized. As of January 2022, the poverty rate is 47%, with a per capita income of $12,555 (national per capita income is $29,829). In 2019, the town manager was paid $127,923 according to public records. This salary is 308 percent higher than average.

The Tabor City Industrial Park is located just northwest of town, a 36-acre certified industrial site perfect for small to medium-sized users seeking 5 to 10 acres of land. Existing tenants include a small packaging warehouse and the Tabor City Business Development Center, while most of the property has sat vacant for most of the existence of the park.

A packaging company, owner and publisher of the Tabor-Loris Tribune, founded in 1946, continues to be a major employer for the area. It has sites throughout the town with almost every residential area being interspersed with industrial sites and associated traffic. They also operate a large facility offshore in the Dominican Republic.

R.J. Corman Railroad Group operates the rail line servicing the town.

== Geography ==
The town lies within the Carolina Border Belt, a regional network of tobacco markets and warehouses along both sides of the North Carolina-South Carolina border.

Tabor City is approximately 30 miles (48 km) from the ocean at North Myrtle Beach, South Carolina and is due north of Myrtle Beach, SC.

According to the United States Census Bureau, the town has a total area of 3.2 square miles (8.2 km^{2}), all land. It is located on the border with South Carolina, approximately 30 miles (48 km) inland from the Atlantic, 28 miles (45 km) north of Myrtle Beach, and 58 miles (93 km) west of Wilmington. Lake Tabor, a 149-acre (60 ha) lake, is on the eastern side of town.

- US 701
- NC 410
- NC 904

U.S. Route 701 runs through the town in a generally north–south direction, while North Carolina Highway 904 generally runs thorough the town in an east–west direction. The two highways intersect at the center of town. In addition, a business loop of US 701 serves also as the main business corridor in Tabor. North Carolina Highway 410 starts at the NC/SC state line before going through the town and continuing on to Chadbourn, North Carolina

Nearest cities:

- Cerro Gordo, North Carolina (4.3 miles)
- Chadbourn, North Carolina (14 miles)
- Loris, South Carolina (7 miles)
- Longs, South Carolina (13.27 miles)
- Conway, South Carolina (15.36 miles)
- Whiteville, North Carolina (19.30 miles)
- Aynor, South Carolina (16.5 miles)
- Nichols, South Carolina (18.4 miles)

Nearest city with pop. 50,000+: Wilmington, North Carolina (57.2 miles, pop. 126,000)

== Government ==
Tabor City has a town manager, assisted by the elected town mayor and town council.

Past mayors have included:

- W. A. Williams – 1953
- Howard Harrelson 1957–1969
- Robert Soles Sr
- Marion Baxter

Tabor City is in the 13th District for the North Carolina Senate, represented by Michael Walters as of September 2014, and in the 46th district for the North Carolina House of Representatives, where, as of September 2021, they are represented by Tabor City native and used car dealer Brenden Jones. Tabor City is in United States House of Representatives' North Carolina 7th Congressional District, NC-7. The current Representative as of January 2022 is David Rouzer.

The city offers its own water and sewer treatment plant and is connected to the Grand Strand Water and Sewer Authority.

== Police and fire ==
Tabor City has its own police department. As of January 2022, the police chief is Donald Dowless. Several officers have run afoul of the law. Since 2019, Tabor City Police Department has maintained community out reach through an official Police Department page on Facebook. A Tabor City Jail was in operation as of 1939. As of 2014, the police department takes any persons needing detaining to the Columbus County Detention Center in Whiteville, NC. In addition, the city is also served by the Columbus County Sheriff. As of April 2021, the sheriff is Jody Greene. The Tabor City Court house is located on 5th street, and hears district court cases on an as needed basis. Superior Court cases for the area are heard in the Whiteville Courthouse. The crime rate in Tabor City is higher than the national average. Property crimes being 150% higher than the national average. There were 19 registered sex offenders living in Tabor City, North Carolina as of January 21, 2022. The ratio of all residents to sex offenders in Tabor City is 217 to 1.

The Tabor City Fire Department, led by Chief Jeff Fowler, serves the city and assists several volunteer departments within the county. Cooperation is often necessary with various South Carolina departments. New trucks were delivered in 1939, 1947 and 1955. There was no fire department in existence in 1925. In February 1934, the fire department consisted of a chief, 14 men, one fire station, a Ford Model A truck with a Barton Pumper(capacity 300 g.p.m.), 1000 ft 2-1/2" hose, 2-35 gal. chemical tanks, & 500 ft 2-1/2" hose. There were 3 fire alarm boxes and the town hall had an electric siren mounted on the roof.

One of the largest North Carolina Prisons, the Tabor City Correctional Institution is operated within the city limits. The construction of the Tabor City Correctional Institution (TCI) began in May 2006 and was completed in April 2008. TCI is located over two miles (3 km) northwest from the center of Tabor City, and its site was annexed by the town. The prison is not located continuously with the city. The cost to build the prison was approximately $94 million, The Tabor City Prison officially opened on August 18, 2008. Crime rates have risen due to the numerous prison guards that commit serious offenses, such as drug smuggling, hit-and-run, murder-for-hire, etc.

== Media ==
In addition to the Tabor-Loris Tribune, published weekly since 1946, the town is served by AM-1370 station WTAB. The feed is also available on line at WTAB RADIO – 1370 AM.

For a while, from 1965 to 1998, WYNA served as the sister station to WTAB and was located in Tabor City. In 1998, Pamplico Broadcasting bought the station, which played country music at that time, and increased its power from 3,000 to 25,000 Watts. After stunting with classical music in October and November 1998, and Christmas music in December, WYNA went off the air in preparation for a move that included changing its community of license to Calabash, North Carolina.

WGHW has a translator in the area to widen its broadcast area.

Television, radio and daily newspapers from Wilmington, Fayetteville, Florence and Myrtle Beach are easily accessible to the residents of the city. The Myrtle Beach Sun News, Wilmington Star-News, and the Fayetteville Observer are available daily to the area. The Whiteville News Reporter is available twice a week as well. Most provide at least some measure of coverage for the town.

== Schools ==
A circa 1870 one-room school house was restored by the historical societies of Tabor City and Columbus County. This school house was built in 1870 using a floor plan and building technique which had been in use since 1820. This building was purchased and donated to the town of Tabor City by a local benefactor.

Tabor City is home to South Columbus High School. Tabor City High School was in operation from the 1920s until 1992. The former high school campus became Tabor City Elementary School. Tabor City Middle School houses grades 6 through 8 and is housed in the former all-black Douglass School facility. After desegregation ended, Douglass School became Tabor City West Elementary School. These schools are part of the Columbus County School System.

== Tabor City Post Office ==
The Tabor City Post Office was in operation as early as the 1880s.

In May 1925, it was located near the north corner of Railroad St. & 5th St. It is noted at this location on the 1925 Sanborn Fire Insurance Map. In February 1934, it was located on the north corner of Railroad St and 4th St. It is noted at this location on the 1934 Sanborn Fire Insurance Map.

A new location was opened in 1942, and included delivery to some areas in South Carolina. A new route was established in 1947, which was the longest highway post office route in the U. S. with a 360-mile daily run. Growth necessitated a new building in 1964, still in use as of January 2022. The post office for Tabor city is located at 200 East 5th street.

South Carolina delivery from the Tabor City Post Office was terminated in 1981, and transferred to the Loris, SC post Office.

== Notable people ==
- W. Horace Carter, newspaper editor, Pulitzer Prize winner
- Joseph Chambers, noted Pentecostal author, pastor in Tabor City, 1957–1958
- Amanda Dowe, American professional basketball player
- Golden Frinks, an American civil rights activist and a Southern Christian Leadership Conference (SCLC) field secretary
- Stonewall Jackson, country music star in the 1950s
- Brenden Jones, politician, NC House of Representatives, 2016 to present
- R. C. Soles, Jr., politician/lawyer, NC House 1968–1976, NC Senate 1977–2011, longest-serving North Carolina legislator
- Wilmer Watts, an American old time singer, banjo player and bandleader in the 1920s, who did the first known recorded version of "The Midnight Special"
- Taffy Wright, Major League Baseball Player, 1938–1949 Finished an 11 season MLB career with a batting average of .311
