= Doug Friednash =

American politician

Member of the Colorado House of Representatives from the 10th district
- In office January 13, 1993 – January 8, 1997
- Preceded by: Betty Neale
- Succeeded by: Dorothy Gotlieb

Personal details
- Born: February 6, 1962 (age 64) Denver, Colorado
- Party: Democratic

Doug Friednash (born February 6, 1962) is an American lawyer and politician who served in the Colorado House of Representatives from the 10th district from 1993 to 1997. He was Governor John Hickenlooper's Chief of Staff from 2015 to 2017. He worked on Michael Hancock's campaign and as city attorney in his administration. As of 2026, he is a shareholder at Brownstein Hyatt Farber Schreck and co-chairs the firm's state government relations group. He also writes opinion columns for The Denver Post.
