= WTAB =

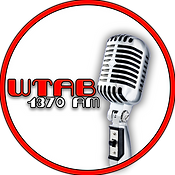
- Tabor City, North Carolina; United States
- Broadcast area: Wilmington, North Carolina; Myrtle Beach, South Carolina; Loris, South Carolina
- Frequency: 1370 kHz
- Branding: 1370 WTAB

Programming
- Format: Full service; country; southern gospel music
- Affiliations: North Carolina News Network

Ownership
- Owner: Marty Eric Sellers; (WTAB Media, Inc.)

History
- First air date: July 1, 1954
- Last air date: March 10, 2025
- Call sign meaning: Tabor City

Technical information
- Licensing authority: FCC
- Facility ID: 24937
- Class: B
- Power: 5,000 watts daytime; 109 watts nighttime
- Transmitter coordinates: 34°9′11.2″N 78°51′39.9″W

Links
- Public license information: Public file; LMS
- Website: www.wtabradio.com

WTAB (1370 AM) was an American radio station that broadcast a full service format, comprising news, sports, local information and country music Monday through Saturday and gospel programming Sundays. Licensed to Tabor City, North Carolina, it served the area that included Tabor City's "twin city", Loris, South Carolina. The station was owned by Marty Eric Sellers' WTAB Media Inc., and was run by the father and son team of Jack "The Colonel" Miller and Richard "Fluff" Miller. WTAB operated from 1954 to 2025.

== History ==
WTAB signed on on July 1, 1954. On September 1, 1965, it gained a sister FM station with the addition of WTAB-FM 104.9 (later WKSM and now WYNA).

WTAB was an early affiliate of Casey Kasem's American Top 40 in the early 1970s.

In 1995, Jack and Bonnie Miller bought the station from Don Curtis. Jack Miller had been with the station since 1975, initially as an announcer.

WTAB received notoriety in 2009 when Sal Governale and Richard Christy from The Howard Stern Show made prank calls to the station's "Swap Shop" program hosted by Jack Miller. According to Miller, the station's website ended up with over 10 million hits and even praised Stern for giving his station some word.

As of May 27, 2011, WTAB was on the air 24 hours per day, 7 days a week. Previously, WTAB signed off usually at 6 p.m. (unless there was a football game) and returned to the air at 6 a.m. despite being licensed for 24-hour broadcasts.

Jack Miller sold WTAB to stepson Eric Sellers and his wife Julie in late 2012.

In March 2025, owner M. Eric Sellers announced that WTAB would close on March 10. The station went off the air at 7 a.m., with "Buy Me a Rose" by Kenny Rogers as its last song. WTAB intended to dismantle its tower and surrender its license; the station's property was sold to neighbor Atlantic Packaging (owner of the Tabor-Loris Tribune newspaper) to serve as its information technology offices. The Federal Communications Commission cancelled the station's license on March 27, 2025.

== Programming ==
Jack Miller hosted the popular "Swap Shop" show while Richard Miller hosted both mornings and afternoons. Other station employees included Bobby Pait, station engineer Lloyd Gore, who had been with WTAB since 1969 and doubled as a fill-in and weekend host and Rodney Inman, who hosted the Sunday morning Gospel show and owns a motorcycle shop in Tabor City.
