= Monica VanBuskirk =

American politician

Member-elect of the Colorado House of Representatives from the 9th district
- Assuming office January 2027
- Succeeding: Emily Sirota

Personal details
- Party: Democratic

Monica VanBuskirk is an American politician. A member of the Democratic Party, she is the member-elect for the 9th district of the Colorado House of Representatives.
