= Amanda Dowe =

American professional basketball player

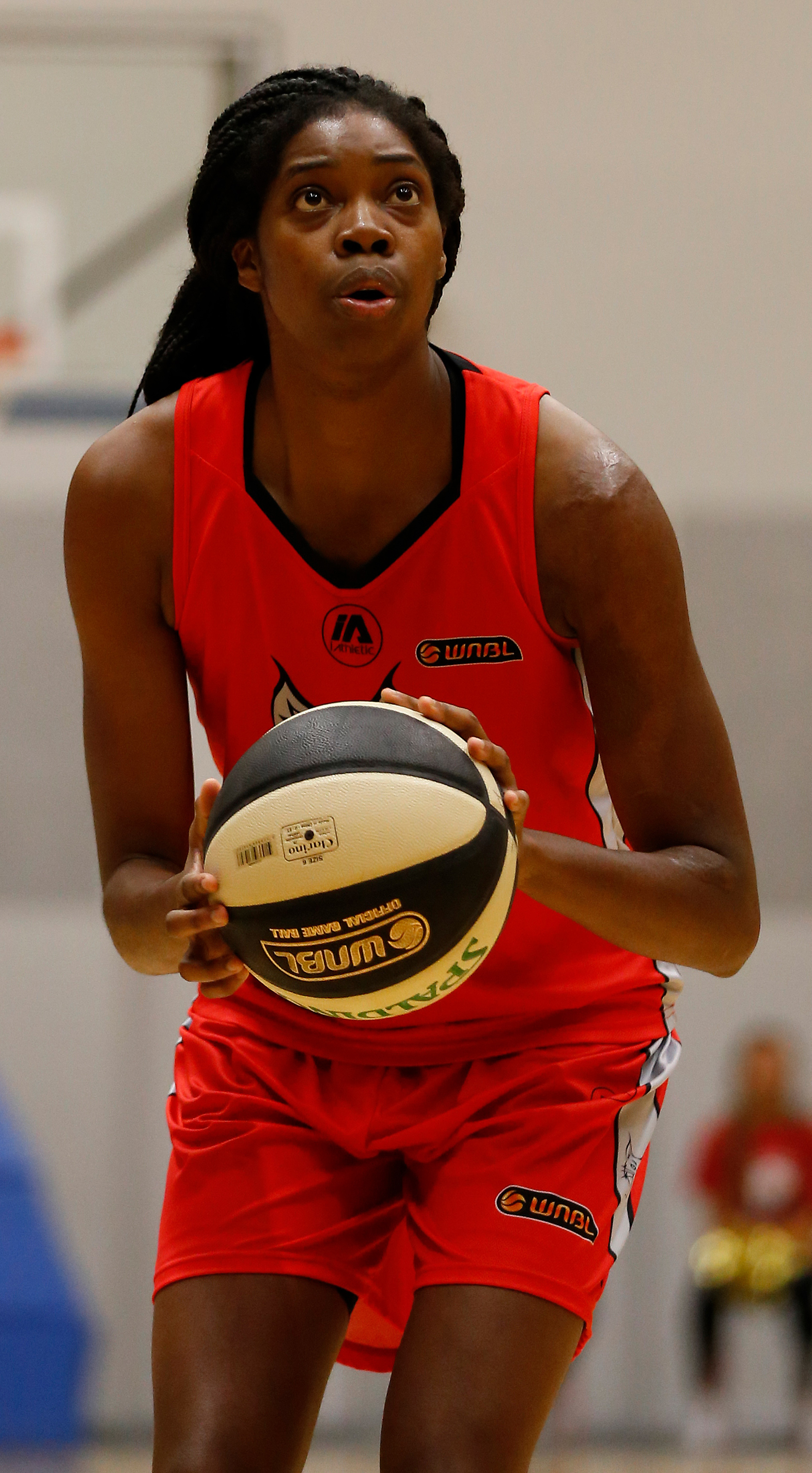
- Dowe in action for the Perth Lynx

Personal information
- Born: May 17, 1991 (age 35) Tabor City, North Carolina
- Listed height: 6 ft 4 in (1.93 m)

Career information
- High school: South Columbus (Tabor City, North Carolina)
- College: Charlotte (2009–2013)
- WNBA draft: 2013: undrafted
- Playing career: 2013–present
- Position: Forward

Career history
- 2013–2014: Uni Girona CB
- 2014: Trogylos Priolo
- 2014–2015: Presidente Venceslau
- 2015–2016: Saarlouis Royals
- 2016–2017: Bretagne Basket
- 2017–2018: Perth Lynx

Amanda Dowe (born May 17, 1991) is an American professional basketball player.

== Biography ==
Amanda Dowe is from Tabor City, North Carolina. She grew up there and began playing basketball while in school there. She played on the South Columbus Stallions Girls Basketball team. Amanda Dowe enters her first season with the University of the South women's basketball program in 2022–23.

== Career ==
=== College ===
Dowe played college basketball at the University of North Carolina at Charlotte in Charlotte, North Carolina for the 49ers in Conference USA of NCAA Division I. During her collegiate career at the University of North Carolina at Charlotte, she was a four-year letterwinner with the 49ers, as her teams made the Women's NIT in each season of her career. Her sophomore season saw the 49ers make the semifinals of the WNIT, and in 2013, the team reached the Sweet 16. She also holds several individual records as well: rebounds in a postseason game (19 vs. Wake Forest, 2013) and offensive rebounds in a game (12 vs. Butler, 2013), breaking a 17-year record. In 121 career games, the Tabor City, N.C. native finished with 767 points, 106 steals and shot 47.6% from the field. Her 916 boards are the fifth-most in school history. During her senior year in 2013, Dowe crashed 374 rebounds for the fourth-most in program history as she earned All-Conference Third Team honors with the Atlantic-10 and First Team with the North Carolina Collegiate Sports Information Association (NCCSIA).

=== Charlotte statistics ===
Legend
GP	Games played	GS	Games started	MPG	Minutes per game
FG%	Field goal percentage	3P%	3-point field goal percentage	FT%	Free throw percentage
RPG	Rebounds per game	APG	Assists per game	SPG	Steals per game
BPG	Blocks per game	PPG	Points per game	**Bold**	Career high

Year	Team	GP	Points	FG%	3P%	FT%	RPG	APG	SPG	BPG	PPG
2009-10	Charlotte	22	36	44.1%	0.0%	50.0%	2.0	0.0	0.2	0.3	1.6
2010-11	Charlotte	**37**	169	**56.9%**	0.0%	60.0%	5.9	0.4	0.6	0.6	4.6
2011-12	Charlotte	30	211	44.0%	0.0%	72.9%	9.3	1.1	**1.4**	0.8	7.0
2012-13	Charlotte	32	**351**	46.9%	0.0%	**73.6%**	**11.7**	**1.2**	1.2	**1.2**	**11.0**
Career		121	731	47.6%	0.0%	68.1%	7.6	0.7	0.9	0.7	6.0

=== Europe ===
Dowe began her professional career with Uni Girona CB in Liga Femenina de Baloncesto for the 2013–14 season. After just 11 games in Spain, Dowe signed with Trogylos Priolo in Italy's Serie A1.

In 2015, Dowe would return to Europe, signing with Saarlouis Royals in the Damen-Basketball-Bundesliga. The following year, Dowe signed with Bretagne Basket in Ligue Féminine de Basketball 2.

=== Australia ===
Dowe played for the Perth Lynx during the 2017–18 WNBL season. Dowe averaged 5.7 rebounds per game, and was named Perth Lynx Most Improved Player at the conclusion of the season.
