= Dorothy Gotlieb =

American politician

Member of the Colorado House of Representatives from the 10th district
- In office January 8, 1997 – January 10, 2001
- Preceded by: Doug Friednash
- Succeeded by: Alice Borodkin

Personal details
- Born: July 31, 1944 (age 81) Cambridge, England
- Party: Republican

Dorothy Gotlieb (born July 31, 1944) is an American politician who served in the Colorado House of Representatives from the 10th district from 1997 to 2001.
