= Davis Memorial =

Memorial in Hiawatha, Kansas

- U.S. National Register of Historic Places
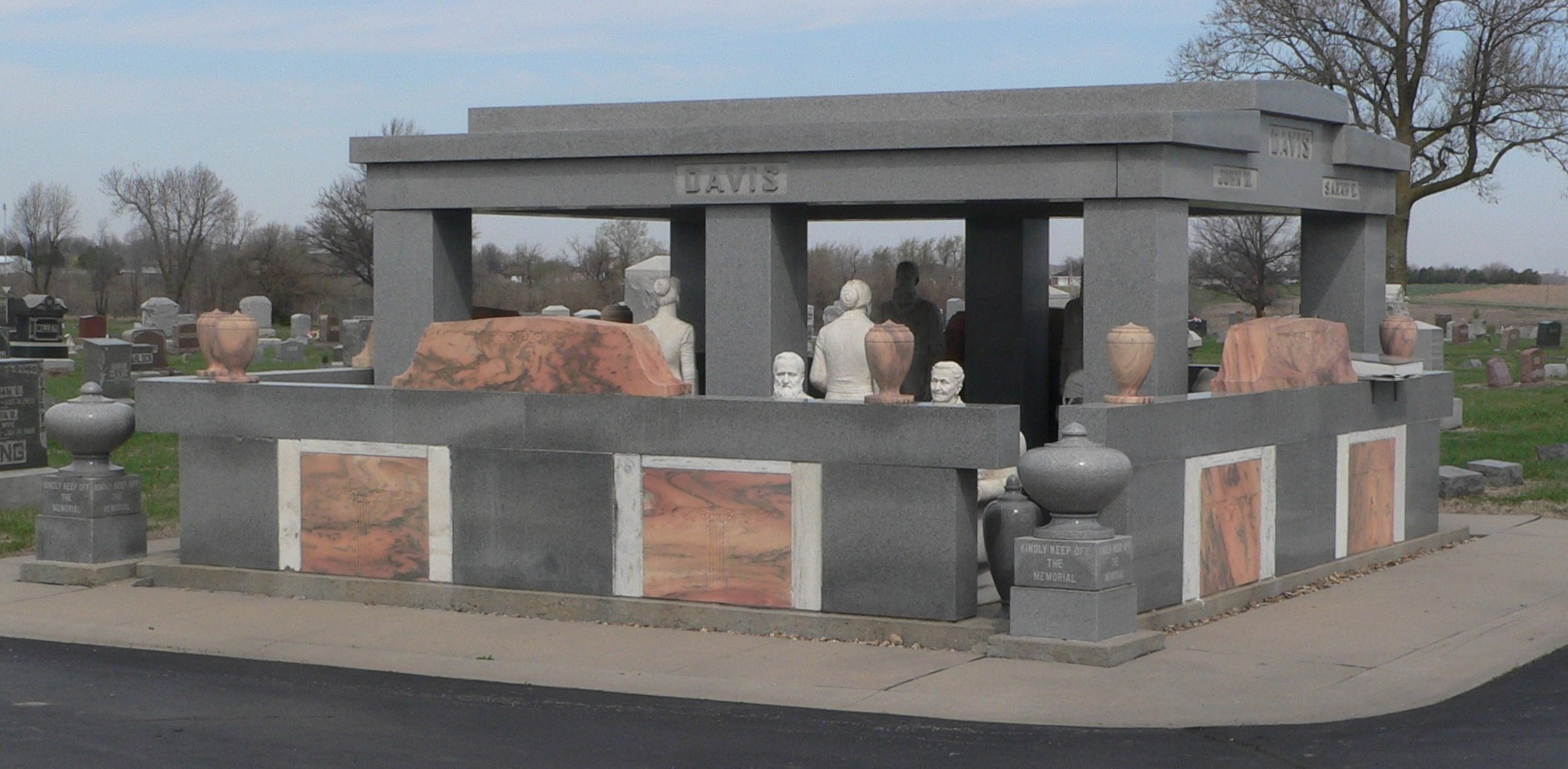
- Coordinates: 39.849214°N 95.515991°W
- Built: 1931
- Architect: Horace England Co.
- NRHP reference No.: 77000571
- Added to NRHP: August 29, 1977

The Davis Memorial is a monument in Hiawatha, Kansas at the Mount Hope Cemetery, built by John Milburn Davis in honor of his wife Sarah after her death. Begun soon after her death in 1930 and completed in 1934, the monument consists of statues of the couple and a small shelter, carved from Italian marble. Its cost (approximately $200,000) led many in the community to criticize Davis for his free spending during the Great Depression. Today, the monument benefits the community financially because of the thousands of tourists who visit it. The memorial was added to the National Register of Historic Places in 1977.
