= Dean Dozen =

The "Dean Dozen", in American politics, was the collective term for six groups of 12 candidates endorsed by Democracy for America, the political action committee led by former Vermont governor and presidential candidate Howard Dean, in the 2004 elections.

Those chosen to be in the Dean Dozens were Democrats. Governor Dean called the Dean Dozen "the progressive movement’s best chance at taking back Congress." Candidates Selected received significant promotion by progressive groups through emails, fundraisers, and speeches. Democracy for America also fundraisers for the candidates directly, using their membership of over a million citizens to seek contributions for candidates directly

They came from across the U.S. and ran for widely varying positions, from county sheriff to U.S. Senator. No incumbents were chosen, and members of Dean Dozens also tended to target key districts.

Candidates in bold won.

In the 2012 elections Governor Dean selected a new Dean Dozen to receive the endorsement of DFA.

== List of Dean Dozens ==
=== First ===
- Mary Ann Andreas: 80th State Assembly District, California
- Ken Campbell: Oconee County Representative, South Carolina State House
- Maria Chappelle-Nadal: 72nd State House District, Missouri State House
- Scott Clark, Mark Manoil and Nina Trasoff: Arizona Corporation Commission
- Kim Hynes: Connecticut State Representative
- Richard Morrison: U.S. Representative from Texas
- Barack Obama: State Senator and U.S. Senate Candidate from Illinois
- Rob MacKenna: Supervisor of Elections in Hillsborough County, Florida
- Monica Palacios-Boyce: Massachusetts State Representative
- Lori Saldaña: California State Assembly
- Jeff Smith: State Senator from Missouri
- Donna Red Wing: District 25, Colorado State House

=== Second ===
- Kalyn Free: United States Representative from Oklahoma (Lost in primary)
- Tom Potter: Mayor of Portland, Oregon
- Alisha Thomas Morgan: Georgia General Assembly
- Samara "Sam" Barend: U.S. Representative from New York
- Peter Corroon: mayor of Salt Lake County, Utah
- Vicki Walker: Missouri State House
- David Van Os: Texas Supreme Court
- Patrick McCormick: County Council for DeKalb County, Illinois
- Jonathan Bing New York State Assembly
- Christine Cegelis: U.S. Representative from Illinois
- Don McDaniel: Georgia General Assembly
- Nelson Thompson: Board of Chosen Freeholders for Cumberland County, New Jersey

=== Third ===
- Jim Stork: United States Congress from Florida
- Tami Green: Washington State House of Representatives
- Susan Clary: Soil and Water Conservation District Supervisor of Orange County, Fl
- Eddgra Fallin: School Board in Huntsville, Al. S
- Missy Taylor: Kansas House of Representatives.
- Judge William O'Neill: Supreme Court of Ohio.
- Patti Fritz: Minnesota State House District 26B.
- Scott Kawasaki: Alaska State House
- Lois Herr: United States Congress from Pennsylvania.
- James Whitaker: Michigan State House.
- Edward Ableser: Arizona House of Representatives.

=== 2012 Dean Dozen ===
- José M. Hernández (CA-10)
- Kathy Boockvar (PA-8)
- **Carol Shea-Porter** (NH-1)
- Joe Miklosi (CO-6)
- **Martin Heinrich** (NM-Sen)
- Shelli Yoder (IN-9)
- **Annie Kuster** (NH-02)
- **Raul Ruiz** (CA-36)
- Manan Trivedi (PA-06)
- **Elizabeth Warren** (MA-Sen)
- **Mazie Hirono** (HI-Sen)
- **Tammy Baldwin** (WI-Sen)

=== Others ===
Other endorsed candidates include:

- Paul Babbitt, candidate for U.S. representative from Arizona
- **Jerry McNerney** and Jim Brandt, candidates for U.S. representative from California
- Stan Matsunaka, candidate for U.S. representative from Colorado
- Jon Jennings and Melina Fox, candidates for U.S. representative from Indiana
- Adam Smith, candidate for U.S. representative from Kentucky
- Nancy Farmer, candidate for U.S. senator from Missouri
- **Brian Schweitzer**, candidate for governor of Montana
- **John Lynch**, candidate for governor of New Hampshire
- Amy Vasquez, Anne Wolfe, Herb Conaway, and Steve Brozak, candidates for U.S. representative from New Jersey
- Richard Romero, candidate for U.S. representative from New Mexico
- Patsy Keever, candidate for U.S. representative from North Carolina
- Greg Harris and Jeff Seemann, candidates for U.S. representative from Ohio
- Joe Hoeffel, candidate for U.S. senator from Pennsylvania
- Peter Clavelle, candidate for governor of Vermont
- Al Weed and James Socas, candidates for U.S. representative from Virginia
