= Joe Miklosi =

American businessman and politician from Colorado

Member of the Colorado House of Representatives from the 9th district
- In office January 7, 2009 – 2013
- Preceded by: Alice Borodkin
- Succeeded by: Paul Rosenthal

Personal details
- Party: Democratic
- Education: University of Colorado at Denver, Hope College
- Occupation: Businessman, politician

Joe Miklosi is an American businessman and politician who served as a Colorado Representative from 2009 to 2013, he worked eight years for Project C.U.R.E., an international health care nonprofit organization, which donates life-saving medical supplies to hospitals in over 130 developing nations, and he helped start an Internet software company in the 1990s. Since 2015, Miklosi has been the CEO of Bridge Consulting, a public benefit corporation that provides international business and development, government relations, and nonprofit fundraising consulting services. He served as legislator in the U.S. state of Colorado. Elected to the Colorado House of Representatives as a Democrat in 2008, Miklosi represented House District 9, which encompasses portions of Arapahoe County and southeast Denver, Colorado.

== Early life, education, and business career ==
Originally from New Boston, Michigan, Miklosi attended Hope College in Michigan, earning a bachelor's degree in 1992, in political science and religion. He later earned a master's degree in public administration with a concentration in nonprofit executive management from the University of Colorado at Denver in 2004. His master's thesis focused on increasing civic engagement among youth.

Miklosi worked in the private sector for six years, for Cyveillance as business development manager, as a software consultant for Computer Associates and Veritas Software, and as a consultant for Aristotle Industries, a campaign software company. Joe also worked for Project C.U.R.E. for nearly eight years until starting Bridge Consulting, a Colorado Public Corporation that provides both political consulting and international nonprofit and business development consulting services.

== Early political career ==
As a worker on the 1992 presidential campaign of Bill Clinton in South Dakota, Miklosi helped organize a 10,000-person rally and get out the vote efforts. He later interned in the White House Office of Public Liaison. Staying in Washington D.C., Miklosi worked as a legislative aide to U.S. Senator Howard Metzenbaum of Ohio, on environmental, interior, and health care issues.

In 2002, Miklosi took the post of Director of Operations for Colorado State Representatives Dan Grossman and Jennifer Veiga. The following year, he served Veiga's Chief of Staff when she became House Minority Leader. In both of these positions, he worked with Democratic legislative candidates as the Democratic Party gained seats in the 2002 and 2004 elections.

Following the 2004 elections, in which Democrats gained a majority in the state house, Miklosi worked under Speaker Andrew Romanoff as Director of the Democratic State House Caucus. He then joined Progressive Majority as their Colorado state director, helping elect progressive candidates to local and legislative races statewide. While at Progressive Majority, he also helped launch the annual Color Colorado Conference, designed to foster engagement and participation in the political process among racial and ethnic minorities.

In 2007, Miklosi joined Project C.U.R.E., the largest organization in the world that annually collects and donates over $60 million worth of quality, donated medical supplies, medical equipment, and related program services, such as onsite needs assessments, to thousands of hospitals and health care clinics in 133 developing nations across the globe. Miklosi generated millions of dollars of revenue for Project C.U.R.E. and worked as the organization's Director of Government Relations for nearly eight years. During his first six months at Project C.U.R.E., Miklosi generated his own salary.

In September, 2015, Miklosi founded Bridge Consulting, a Public Benefit Corporation or B-Corp. Bridge Consulting helps clients navigate government bureaucracies and assists nonprofits receive government, foundation, and corporate funding by providing government relations, Corporate Social Responsibility, and Public Private Partnership consulting services both domestically and internationally. Bridge Consulting also provides political consulting, lobbying, and international business development services.

== Legislative career in the General Assembly ==
=== 2008 election ===
Joe Miklosi defeated Paul Rosenthal in a contested and bitter Democratic primary in August, taking 58 percent of votes cast in District 9.

Miklosi faced Republican James Landauer in the November 2008 general election. Miklosi's candidacy was endorsed by the Denver Post, and he won the race with 67 percent of the popular vote.

=== 2009 legislative session ===
For the 2009 legislative session, Miklosi was named to seats on the House Judiciary Committee, the House State, Veterans, and Military Affairs Committee, and the Legislative Audit Committee.

=== 2010 Election ===
Representative Miklosi defeated Republican challenger Bob Lane by a margin of 61% to 39%.

=== 2012 legislative session ===
Representative Miklosi announced he would not stand for re-election in House District 9 and would challenge incumbent Republican congressman Mike Coffman. Miklosi was succeeded by onetime opponent Paul Rosenthal.

== 2012 congressional election ==
Miklosi is running for the newly redrawn Colorado's 6th congressional district, currently represented by conservative Republican Mike Coffman. Coffman's old district was won by McCain with 53%. The new district was won by Barack Obama with 54% of the vote (in line with the statewide average). The 6th Congressional district is now considered a swing district.

He got the endorsement from every Democrat currently serving in the Colorado State House of Representatives and former Colorado House Speaker Andrew Romanoff. He was also endorsed by former U.S. Congressman John Salazar, Planned Parenthood, and Colorado AFL-CIO. Miklosi received the endorsement of Democracy for America, and was selected as one of their Dean Dozen.

=== Endorsements and ratings ===
Miklosi was endorsed by Democracy For America in December 2011. The group then adopted Miklosi into their "Dean Dozen," a listing of their 12 highest-priority candidates, in August 2012. He was also endorsed by the group's founder, former Vermont Gov. Howard Dean, at that time. The group has raised Miklosi over $40,000 as of October 2012.

MoveOn.org's Colorado members endorsed Miklosi in July 2012.

The Colorado branch of the AFL-CIO labor union endorsed Miklosi in November 2011.

=== 2012 Congressional election ===
In the 2012 General Election, Representative Miklosi faced incumbent Republican Coffman. Coffman was reelected by a margin of 48% to 46% with neither candidate receiving a majority.
