= W. Horace Carter =

American newspaper publisher and editor (1921–2009)

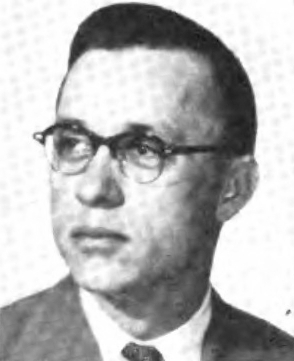
- Carter c. 1954
- Born: Walter Horace Carter; January 20, 1921; Albemarle, North Carolina, U.S.
- Died: September 16, 2009 (aged 88)
- Education: University of North Carolina at Chapel Hill
- Occupation: Newspaper publisher
- Children: 3

Walter Horace Carter (January 20, 1921 – September 16, 2009) was an American newspaper publisher in Tabor City, North Carolina, whose paper won a 1953 Pulitzer Prize for his reporting on the activities of the Ku Klux Klan and his editorials which opposed them. Filmmaker Walt Campbell's documentary The Editor and the Dragon: Horace Carter Fights the Clan recounts Carter's account of his newspaper and his personal conflict with the local Klan.

== Early life and education ==
Carter was born on January 20, 1921, in Albemarle, North Carolina. After graduating from high school, the first in his family to do so, he attended the University of North Carolina at Chapel Hill. At UNC, he worked as editor of the student paper. He served in the United States Navy during World War II, where he saw action in the North Atlantic Ocean and the Pacific Theater of Operations.

== The Tribune and the KKK ==
After the completion of his military service, Carter was hired by the merchants association in Tabor City, North Carolina. With the connections he established there, he founded a weekly newspaper in 1946 called the Tabor City Tribune.

In the July 26, 1950, issue of The Tribune, Carter wrote "An Editorial: No Excuse for KKK" in response to a July 22 parade by a Klan group through Tabor City, taking a strong stance against the Ku Klux Klan as an example of "outside-the-law operations that lead to dictatorships through fear and insecurity" and calling the group "the personification of Fascism and Nazism". The editorial was the first of more than 100 such newspaper pieces that Carter wrote in the three succeeding years expressing his fierce opposition to the Klan and its methods, providing details of rallies and Klan violence. The KKK didn't appreciate Carter's actions, and Thomas Hamilton, Grand Dragon of the Association of Carolina Klans, threatened his paper and its advertisers. Though he found some support in the local community, Carter's views were largely rejected by the community at large, leaving him and his family isolated and often subject to retaliation. His son Rusty, when about four years old, asked "The Klan gonna come and get you Daddy?"

Carter's reporting led to the involvement of the Federal Bureau of Investigation into the activities of the local Klan, leading to the convictions on both federal and state charges of many of its members, including Grand Dragon, Thomas Hamilton. Along with Willard Cole's Whiteville News Reporter, Carter's Tabor City Tribune won the 1953 Pulitzer Prize for Public Service citing "their successful campaign against the Ku Klux Klan, waged on their own doorstep at the risk of economic loss and personal danger, culminating in the conviction of over one hundred Klansmen and an end to terrorism in their communities."

== Personal ==
After retiring from the newspaper business in the 1970s, Carter moved to Cross Creek, Florida. After a few decades of fishing and writing about the outdoors (the Library of Congress catalogs 12 books published 1980 to 2001), Carter returned to Tabor City and returned to The Tribune.

The newspaper is still in circulation today, now called The Tabor-Loris Tribune, and it is owned and operated by parent company Atlantic Packaging Corporation. Carter worked in the newspaper division of Atlantic in Tabor City, N.C., writing his weekly editorials, until a week before his death.

Carter died at age 88 on September 16, 2009, of a heart attack while being transported to his Tabor City home from the New Hanover Regional Medical Center in Wilmington, North Carolina. He was married three times and had three children.
