= Paul Rosenthal (Colorado politician) =

American activist, teacher, and politician from Colorado

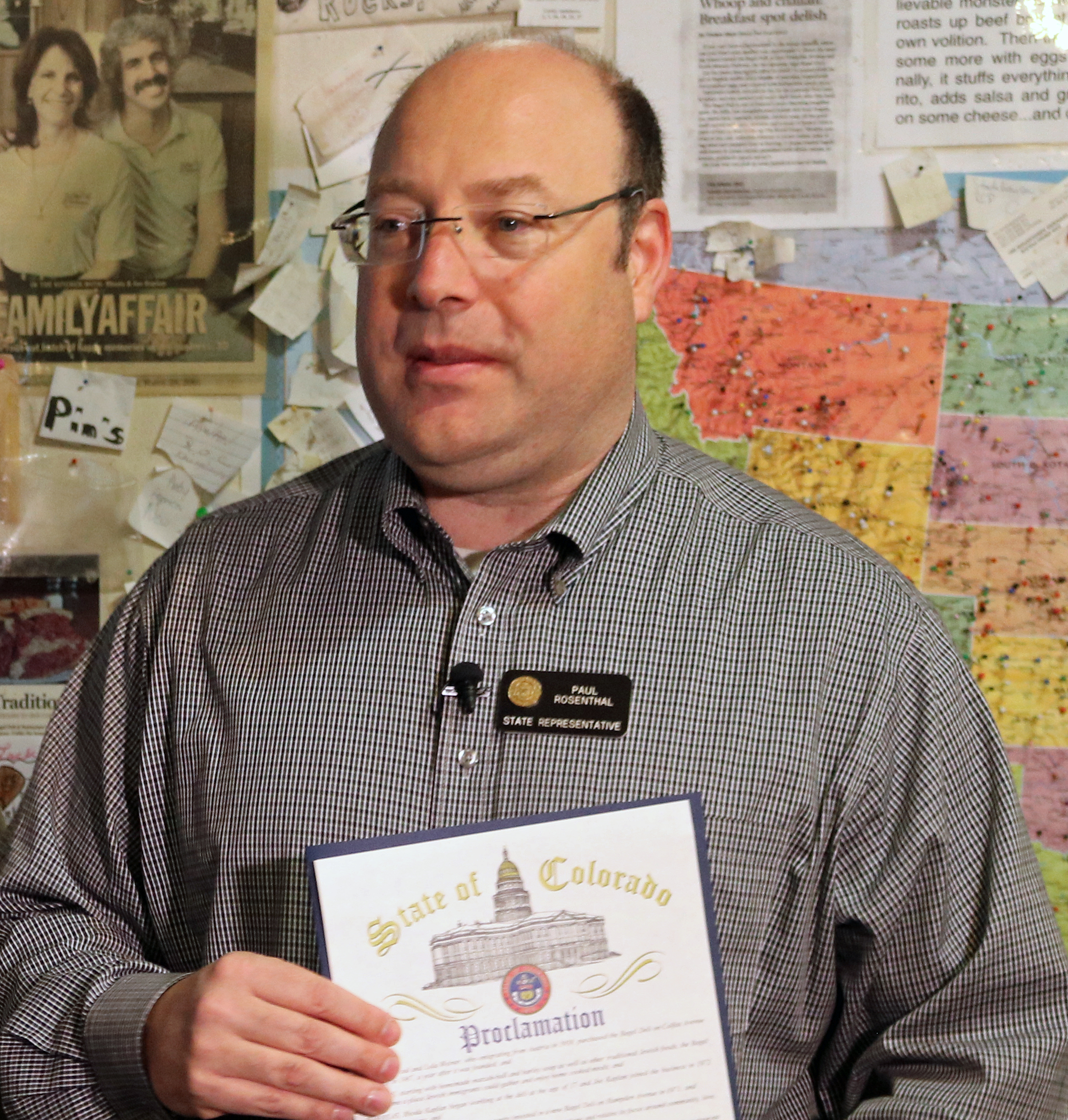
- Paul Rosenthal in 2017

Member of the Colorado House of Representatives from the 9th district
- In office January 9, 2013 – January 4, 2019
- Preceded by: Joe Miklosi
- Succeeded by: Emily Sirota

Personal details
- Party: Democratic
- Occupation: Activist, teacher, politician

Paul Rosenthal is an American community activist, teacher and politician who served in the Colorado House of Representatives from 2013 to 2019. He represented House District 9.

Rosenthal ran for re-election in 2018 but was eliminated in the Democratic primary, so he was not a candidate in the general election.

== 2020 RTD board election ==
In 2020, Rosenthal ran for a seat on Denver's Regional Transportation District board of directors. The board has fifteen elected members who serve four-year terms. Rosenthal was unopposed for the District E seat and won 63,442 votes, 100% of the votes cast.
