= Emily Sirota =

American politician from Colorado

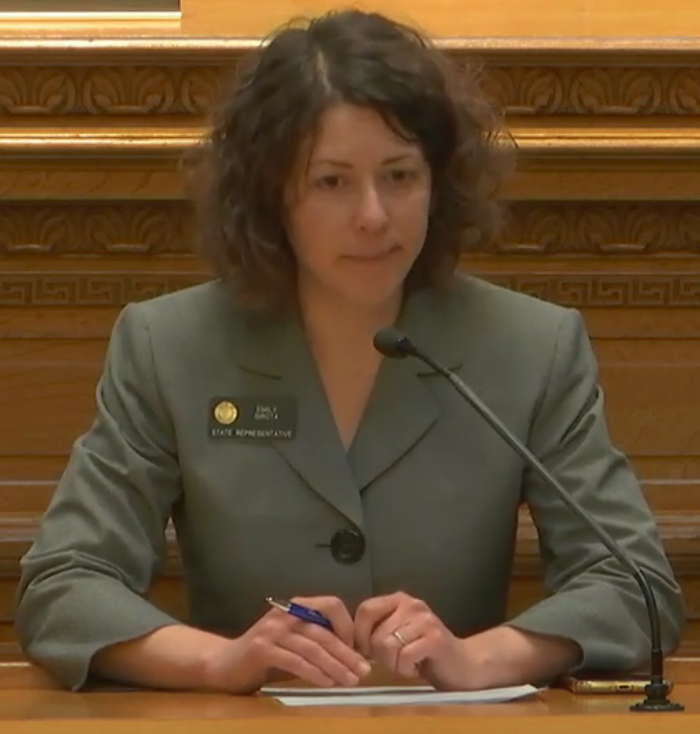
- Sirota in 2019

Member of the Colorado House of Representatives from the 9th district
- Incumbent
- Assumed office January 4, 2019
- Preceded by: Paul Rosenthal
- Succeeded by: Monica VanBuskirk (elect)

Personal details
- Born: August 7, 1979 (age 47)
- Party: Democratic
- Spouse: David Sirota
- Education: Indiana University (BA); University of Denver (MSW)
- Occupation: Politician

Emily Lipp Sirota (born August 7, 1979) is an American politician who is a member of the Colorado House of Representatives from the 9th district in the City and County of Denver.

== Early life and career ==
Sirota earned a bachelor's degree in political science from Indiana University Bloomington. She served as a legislative aide for the United States Congress until 2005, when she went to work for the administration of Brian Schweitzer, the governor of Montana. Sirota earned a Master of Social Work at the University of Denver.

== Colorado House of Representatives ==
Sirota was elected to the Colorado House of Representatives in the general election on November 6, 2018, winning 71 percent of the vote over 29 percent of Republican candidate Bob Lane. She was re-elected in 2020 and 2022.

Sirota sits on the Energy and Environment committee of the Colorado House of Representatives in addition to being included on the State, Veterans, and Military Affairs Committee. In 2022, Sirota was selected to fill one of the vacant seats on the influential Joint Budget Committee for her next term starting in January 2023. Sirota's policy focus include accessible healthcare, protecting the environment, gun violence prevention and supporting worker rights.

== Personal life ==
Sirota is a social worker. Sirota is married to political commentator and radio host David Sirota. They have two children.
