= Alice Borodkin =

American politician

Member of the Colorado House of Representatives from the 9th district
- In office January 8, 2003 – January 14, 2009
- Preceded by: Ken Gordon
- Succeeded by: Joe Miklosi

Member of the Colorado House of Representatives from the 10th district
- In office January 10, 2001 – January 8, 2003
- Preceded by: Dorothy Gotlieb
- Succeeded by: Alice Madden

Personal details
- Born: April 16, 1933 New York City, New York
- Died: April 9, 2023 (aged 89) Denver, Colorado
- Party: Democratic

Alice Borodkin (April 16, 1933 – April 9, 2023) was a businesswoman, newspaper publisher, and American politician who served in the Colorado House of Representatives from 2001 to 2009. She was a Democrat. She was married to Howard Borodkin with whom she had two children and after his death married Arnold Brodsky. She wrote a memoir titled Caught Between the Bettys, referencing Betty Crocker and Betty Friedan. She was a pulot.

She was born in New York City. She died on April, 9, 2023, in Denver, Colorado at age 89. The Denver Public Library has a collection of her papers. She was Jewish.
