= 1953 Pulitzer Prize =

Awards for journalism and related fields

The following are the Pulitzer Prizes for 1953.

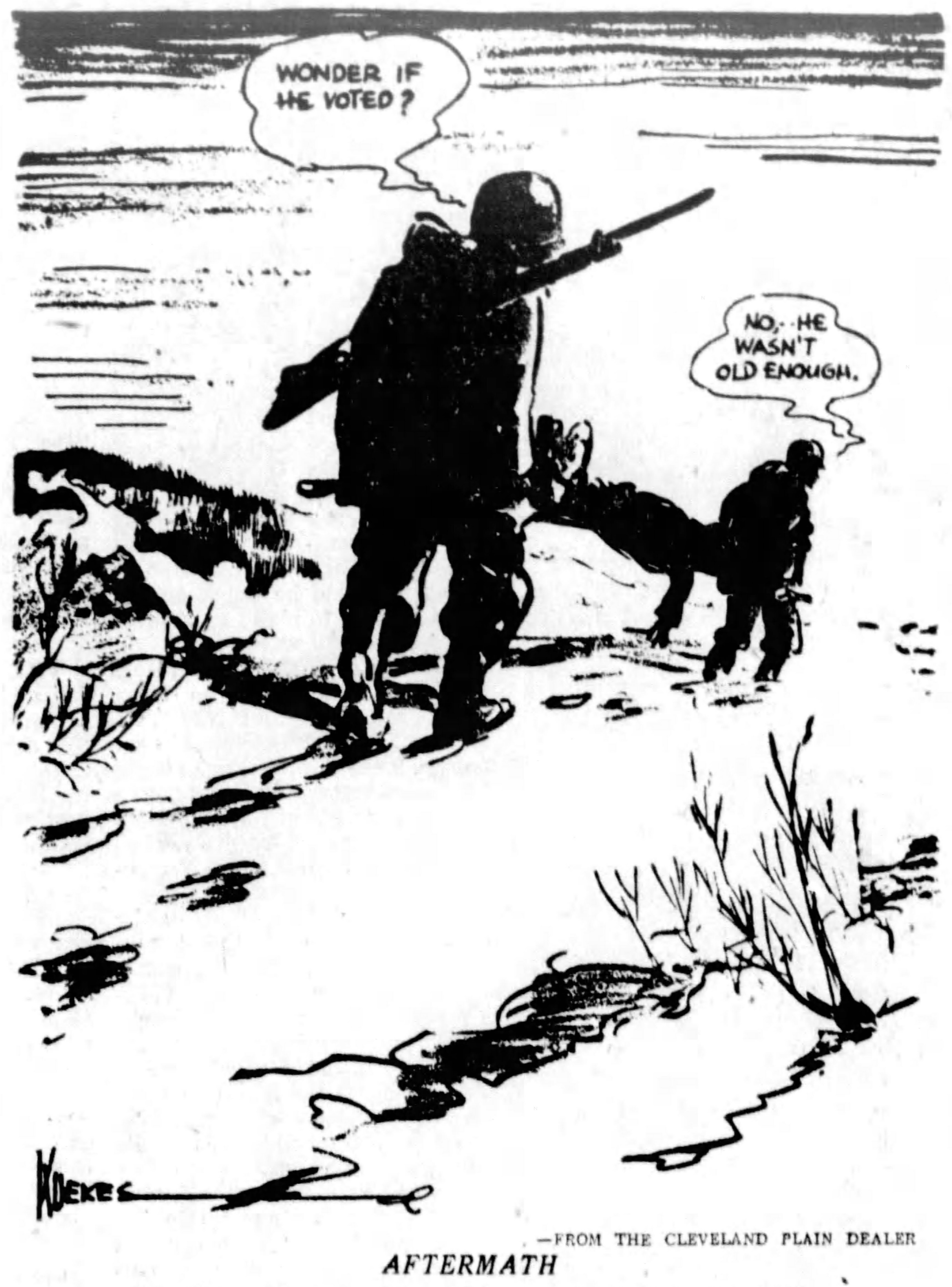
"Aftermath", the prize-winning editorial cartoon

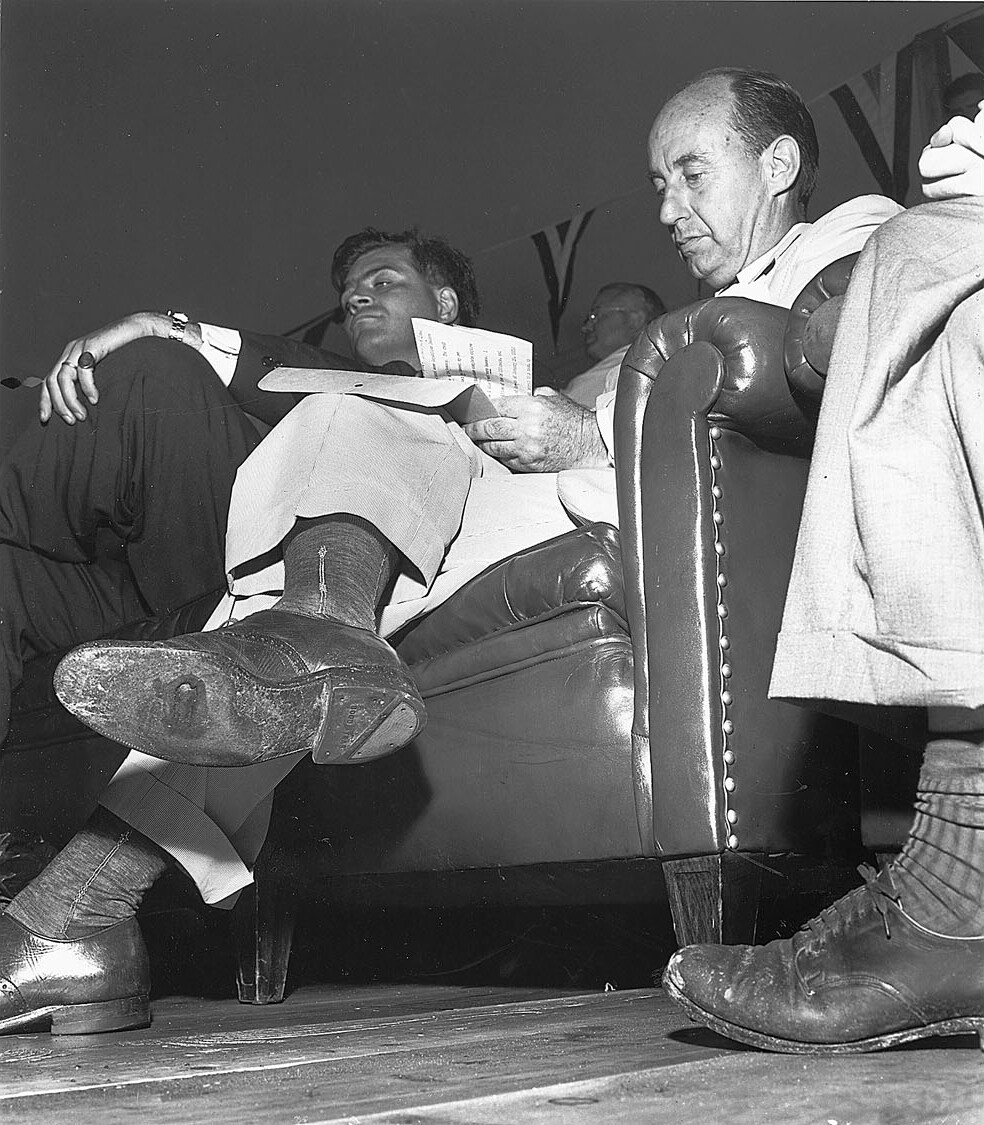
"Adlai Bares His Sole", the prize-winning photograph

== Journalism awards ==
- Public Service:
  - Whiteville (N.C.) News Reporter and Tabor City (N.C.) Tribune, two weekly newspapers, for their successful campaign against the Ku Klux Klan, waged on their own doorstep at the risk of economic loss and personal danger, culminating in the conviction of over one hundred Klansmen and an end to terrorism in their communities.
- Local Reporting, Edition Time:
  - Editorial staff of the Providence Journal and Evening Bulletin, for their spontaneous and cooperative coverage of a bank robbery and police chase leading to the capture of the bandit.
- Local Report, No Edition Time:
  - Edward J. Mowery, New York World-Telegram and Sun, for his reporting of the facts which brought vindication and freedom to Louis Hoffner.
- National Reporting:
  - Don Whitehead, Associated Press, for his article called "The Great Deception", dealing with the intricate arrangements by which the safety of President-elect Dwight D. Eisenhower was guarded en route from Morningside Heights in New York to Korea.
- International Reporting:
  - Austin Wehrwein, Milwaukee Journal, for a series of articles on Canada.
- Editorial Writing:
  - Vermont Connecticut Royster, The Wall Street Journal, for distinguished editorial writing during the year.
- Editorial Cartooning:
  - Edward D. Kuekes, The Plain Dealer, for "Aftermath".
- Photography:
  - William M. Gallagher, Flint Journal (Michigan), for a photo of ex-Governor Adlai E. Stevenson with a hole in his shoe taken during the 1952 Presidential campaign.
- Special Citation:
  - The New York Times, for the section of its Sunday newspaper edited by Lester Markel and headed, "Review of the Week", which for seventeen years has brought enlightenment and intelligent commentary to its readers.

== Letters, Drama and Music Awards ==
- Fiction:
  - The Old Man and the Sea by Ernest Hemingway (Scribner)
- History:
  - The Era of Good Feelings by George Dangerfield (Harcourt)
- Biography or Autobiography:
  - Edmund Pendleton 1721-1803 by David J. Mays (Harvard Univ. Press)
- Poetry:
  - Collected Poems 1917-1952 by Archibald MacLeish (Houghton)
- Drama:
  - Picnic by William Inge (Random House)
- Music:
  - No award given
