= William M. Gallagher =

American photographer (1923–1975)

- Born: February 26, 1923; Hiawatha, Kansas
- Died: September 28, 1975 (aged 52)
- Occupation: Photographer
- Known for: Photograph of presidential candidate Adlai Stevenson II

William M. Gallagher (February 26, 1923 – September 28, 1975) was an American photographer who won the 1953 Pulitzer Prize for Photography for his photograph of presidential candidate Adlai Stevenson II. Gallagher was a photographer for 27 years with the Flint Journal in Flint, Michigan.

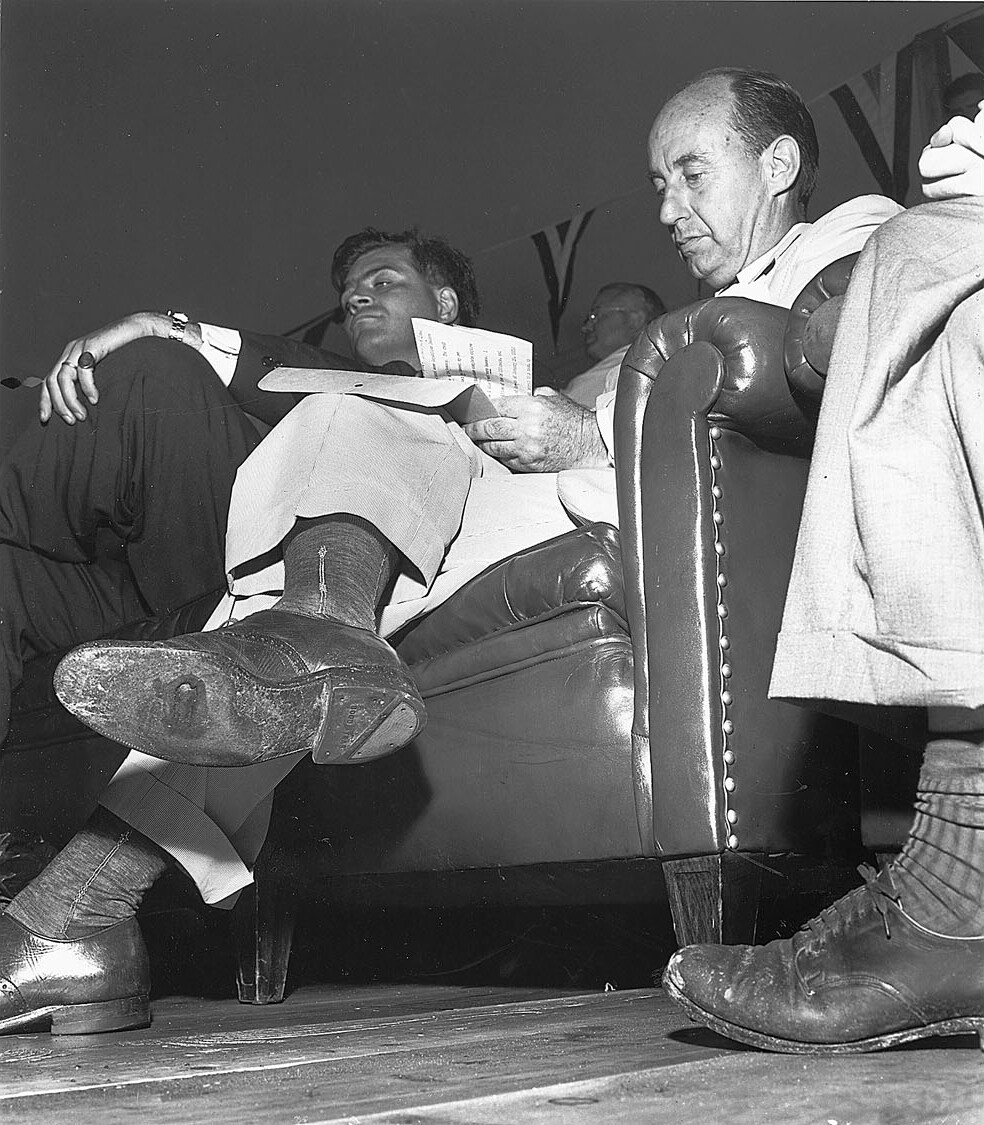
Gallagher's Pulitzer Prize-winning photograph of Adlai Stevenson

Gallagher was born in Hiawatha, Kansas. In 1936 he moved to Flint and graduated from St. Matthew's High School in 1943. During World War II he served in the United States Army in the signal corps, medical corps, and air corps.

Gallagher earned his first camera while in high school by selling magazines. He began his professional photography career with the Sporting Digest in Flint in 1946. The following year he moved to the Flint Journal and within a few months became a staff photographer, a position he would hold until his death. Gallagher's colleagues described him as "a boisterous, flamboyant character" who had good relationships with local police and government officials. He was fond of pranks, once lighting a cherry bomb inside the police department and watching the officers scramble, while another time he commandeered a police helicopter while covering a story.

Gallagher snapped his Pulitzer-winning photo at a Labor Day rally in Flint Park. Democratic presidential candidate Adlai Stevenson was seated on a platform with Michigan Governor G. Mennen Williams. Gallagher, kneeling at the base of the platform, took a photo of Stevenson seated with his legs crossed, which revealed a hole in the bottom of his right shoe. Because of Gallagher's position, he had to take this photo without looking through the shutter first. Gallagher didn't take the photo seriously and didn't think the Journal would publish it since they endorsed Stevenson's Republican opponent Dwight D. Eisenhower, so he gave it to his editor saying "I just finished this for the hell of it. I don't suppose a Republican paper would want to use it." However, the Journal ran the photo on the front page. The New York Times wrote that Gallagher's photo was "one of the outstanding pictures of the campaign", perhaps because it contrasted with Stevenson's serious, patrician image. Stevenson was sent an "avalanche" of shoes by people who saw the image and when Gallagher won the Pulitzer Stevenson sent him a telegram reading "Glad to hear you won with a hole in one."

Gallagher died of meningitis at age 52.
