= Betty Neale =

American lobbyist and state legislator (1927-2018)

Member of the Colorado House of Representatives
- In office 1975–1992

Personal details
- Born: Betty Irene Overfield; May 20, 1927 Hiawatha, Kansas, USA
- Died: October 12, 2018 (aged 91)
- Resting place: Denver, Colorado, USA
- Spouse: Dory J. Neale Jr. (1948-1971)

Betty Irene Neale (née Overfield; May 20, 1927 – October 12, 2018) was an American lobbyist and state legislator in Colorado. She served in the Colorado House of Representatives as a Republican from 1975-1992. She became the first woman Speaker Pro Tempore of the Colorado House of Representatives during the 1991-1992 term and the first woman chair of the Business Affairs and Labor Committee in 1987.

== Early life and education ==
Overfield was born May 20, 1927, in Hiawatha, Kansas to Ira and Nellie Overfield. She graduated from Hiawatha High School in 1945, then attended a business college before studying at the University of Kansas.

== Career ==
Neale briefly worked as an accountant at Southwestern Bell Telephone Company before her family moved to Denver, Colorado in 1958.

Neale became a precinct committeewoman in 1965, then served as a delegate to the Colorado Republican Assembly the following year. In 1969, she became a district captain. Three years later, she served as an alternate delegate to the Republican National Convention.

In 1972, Neale became the state legislator representing the 14th House District, which was later reformed as the 10th House District. During her tenure, she received multiple accolades. In 1977, she became the first woman to serve on the state's Joint Budget Committee. She was then appointed to the Colorado Commission on Child Support and the Colorado Commission on Children and Their Families. She went on to be named Legislator of the Year by the Denver Board for the Developmentally Disabled (1980), National Child Support Association (1987), and Associated Press (1991). In 1991, Neale became the first woman Speaker Pro Tempore of the Colorado House of Representatives. She did not run for re-election in 1992.

After leaving the Colorado House of Representatives, Neale was appointed as the Deputy Director of Finance for the City and County of Denver by Mayor Wellington Webb. From 1994-2002, she was a lobbyist for Denver. After her death, she was memorialized by Colorado Bill HM20-1003 "Memorializing Betty Neale". The legislation was passed in 2020.

== Personal life ==
Overfield married Dory J. Neale Jr. on September 18, 1948 and had three sons: Dory Alan "Butch" (1949), Steven Michael (1951), and Scott. The couple divorced circa 1971.

Neale died October 12, 2018.
