= Colorado's 9th House of Representatives district =

American legislative district

Colorado's 9th State House of Representatives district
Representative
Emily Sirota; D–Denver
- Demographics: 59% White; 11% Black; 19% Hispanic; 4% Asian; 0% Native American; 6% Multiracial
- Population (2021): 92,992

Colorado's 9th House of Representatives district is one of 65 districts in the Colorado House of Representatives. It has been represented by Democrat Emily Sirota since 2019.

== Geography ==
District 9 is located in central Denver, containing the areas of Glendale, Holly Hills and Sullivan.

== Members ==
- Ken Gordon (until 2003)
- Alice Borodkin (2003–2009)
- Joe Miklosi (2009–2013)
- Paul Rosenthal (2013–2019)
- Emily Sirota (since 2019)
