= Tabor-Loris Tribune =

Weekly newspaper in Tabor City and Loris, South Carolina, U.S.

- Type: Weekly newspaper
- Owner: Atlantic Corporation
- Founder: W. Horace Carter
- Editor: Deuce Niven
- Founded: 1946
- Headquarters: 102 Avon Street, Tabor City, NC
- Circulation: 1,200
- ISSN: 2156-2334
- Website: tabor-loris.com

The Tabor-Loris Tribune (formerly The Tabor City Tribune) is a weekly newspaper serving Tabor City, North Carolina and Loris, South Carolina in the southeastern United States. It was founded in 1946 by W. Horace Carter. In 1953 two journalists for the paper won a Pulitzer Prize for Public Service after a series of articles on the Ku Klux Klan that led to an FBI investigation, resulting in 254 convictions of Klansmen. The paper was renamed the Tabor-Loris Tribune in 2010 and has been cited by other organizations for its local news coverage.

== History ==
W. Horace Carter launched the Tabor City Tribune in 1946, shortly after graduating the University of North Carolina journalism school. He also founded the Atlantic Corporation, which retains ownership of the newspaper.

The paper published a series of reports and editorials on the Ku Klux Klan starting July 26, 1950, in response to the white supremacist organization's resurgence in the area following World War II. Their efforts and the accompanying dangers were noted in the trade press. In 1953, days after the Ku Klux Klan launched a recruiting drive with a parade through Tabor City, Carter published "An Editorial: No Excuse for KKK." The paper published more than 100 news stories about, and editorials opposing, the KKK from 1950 to 1953.

He and his paper endured a number of threats, but found an ally in neighboring Whiteville. Willard Cole, editor of the Whiteville News Reporter and a former employee of the Tribune, republished many of the Tribune's stories. The reporting lead to an FBI investigation, resulting in 254 convictions of Klansmen, of which 62 were imprisoned or fined. The two journalists were awarded the 1953 Pulitzer Prize for Public Service. The Tribune was the first weekly newspaper in the United States to win a Pulitzer. Carter later donated the Pulitzer to the School of Journalism and Mass Communication at the University of North Carolina at Chapel Hill, where it was on display as of 2009. They also both won Sidney Hillman awards. Carter has been credited with attracting industry to the area.

Carter left the paper when he moved to Florida, turning it over to his son Rusty Carter. He returned to work as editor emeritus in the 1990s. In 1993, during a period of unrest over the dismissal of Black police chief Willie Gore, Carter was quoted in regional news coverage as an authority on race relations in Tabor City. (Notably, coverage of the campaign against the Klan established that racial prejudice was not a central feature of its activities in the Carolinas in the early 1950s.

The paper was renamed the Tabor-Loris Tribune by 2007. Rusty Carter was fined $5,000 and barred for two years from contributing to political campaigns, after having dispensed hundreds of thousands of dollars as bonuses to Atlantic Corp. employees with the understanding that some of them would be used as poli tical campaign contributions.

The Atlantic Packaging Corp., as it is now known, remains in the Carter family, and retains ownership of the newspaper. It has grown into a $500 million company employing more than 800 workers in the U.S. and the Caribbean, remains under the leadership of the Carter family; Rusty Carter was president until 2016, when his son Wes Carter took over the role. The paper provides about a tenth of a percent of the company's revenue, and its leadership regards the paper as a "public service." Other news outlets have cited the Tabor-Loris Tribune for its coverage of local issues and events. The paper was part of a coalition of local and national news outlets that called on a judge to release search warrants sealed during a criminal investigation into voting irregularities in North Carolina's 9th congressional district in 2018. The warrants were subsequently unsealed. The Tribune's circulation is estimated at 1,200 in 2018.
