= The News Reporter =

Newspaper in Whiteville, North Carolina, U.S.

- 11-17-2008 front page
- Type: Biweekly newspaper
- Format: Broadsheet
- Owner: Justin Smith
- Founded: 1896
- Language: English
- Headquarters: 127 W. Columbus St., Whiteville, North Carolina United States
- Circulation: 8,100
- Website: whiteville.com

The News Reporter is a broadsheet semi-weekly (Tuesday and Friday) newspaper based in Whiteville, North Carolina.

== History ==
The paper was founded in 1896 and serves Columbus County, North Carolina, United States. The News Reporter won the Pulitzer Prize for Public Service in 1953, shared with the Tabor City Tribune, for reporting of Ku Klux Klan activities in Columbus County, NC.

The News Reporter had been owned by the Thompson/High family since 1938. Les High and Stuart High Rogers sold the paper in 2021 to Justin Smith, the paper's editor.

== See also ==
- W. Horace Carter#The Tribune and the KKK
