= List of killings by law enforcement officers in the United States, May 2024 =

This is a list of people reported killed by non-military law enforcement officers in the United States in May 2024, whether in the line of duty or not, and regardless of reason or method. The listing documents the occurrence of a death, making no implications regarding wrongdoing or justification on the part of the person killed or officer involved. Killings are arranged by date of the incident that caused death. Different death dates, if known, are noted in the description. The table below lists 140 people.

== May 2024 ==
Date	Name (age) of deceased	Race	Location	Description
2024-05-31	John Perry (63)	White	Saybrook Township, Ohio	Police responded to a call reporting a man aiming a gun at neighbors and children. After attempts to negotiate with the suspect failed, the man opened fire, striking SWAT vehicles. The responding officers returned fire and killed the man.
2024-05-30	Gino Anthony Marcoccia (49)	White	Linn County, Oregon	
2024-05-30	Daniel Lewis (27)	Black	Miami Gardens, Florida	Police stated that when ATF agents and the police officers with the Miami Gardens Police Department were working undercover, Lewis fired shots at them. Two officers and one ATF agent returned fire, killing him. Two firearms were found next to Lewis's body.
2024-05-30	unidentified male	Unknown	Jackson, Mississippi	When officers were arresting a man, the man ran in the woods with a knife. After the backup officers arrived, the suspect came out of the woods with a knife and was fatally shot.
2024-05-30	Mustafa Ahmed Mohamed (35)	Black	Minneapolis, Minnesota	2024 Minneapolis shooting: The incident started on the evening of May 30. In Whittier, someone heard four or five gunshots in an apartment and reported it to the police. One of the first responders, Minneapolis Police Department officer Jamal Mitchell, arrived at the scene and observed two male with injuries. Later identified as Mohamed and another injured bystander. He approached Mohamed to assist him, however, Mohamed shot and killed him at a close range. Police later returned fire, killing him. In the incident, 4 people were killed (including Mohamed) and 3 people were injured.
2024-05-30	Hugo Cachua (37)	Latino	Ontario, California	An off-duty LAPD officer shot and killed Cachua after a fender-bender and fight. One of the gunshots hit Cachua, who was unarmed, in the back.
2024-05-30	unidentified male	Native American	Tulsa, Oklahoma	
2024-05-30	Bishop Jones-Daniel (28)	Black	Silver Spring, Maryland	At around 11:40 P.M. EST, a person called 911 to report that an unidentified male was inside of an apartment with his mother, armed with a gun. Police arrived and attempted to negotiate with the man. Eventually, around 2 AM, police entered the apartment and fatally shot the man.
2024-05-29	Ross M. Robertson (39)	White	Missoula, Montana	
2024-05-29	Aaron Richard Nielson (45)	White	Prescott, Arizona	
2024-05-28	Michael Edminson (40)	White	Holly Hill, Florida	Holly Hill police responded to a report of a man armed with a knife threatening to harm and kill others. When the officer arrived, Edminson charged at him with a knife. The officer then opened fire, killing him.
2024-05-28	Kenneth Vickers (36)	White	Rowan County, North Carolina	
2024-05-28	Jerrett Dwain Gray Jr. (20)	Black	Indianapolis, Indiana	
2024-05-28	Sergio Francisco Alvarez (48)	Hispanic	Phoenix, Arizona	
2024-05-28	Jamar Franklin Robinson (33)	Black	Newton, North Carolina	
2024-05-27	Tracey D. Watson (35)	Black	Chicago, Illinois	When officers were patrolling, they saw Watson attempting to stab another man in the street. Watson refused to drop the knife and attacked the victim. Officers then fired shots at them, which wounded both Watson and the victim. Watson died in the hospital and the victim still remains in critical condition.
2024-05-27	Jason Burk (41)	White	Kansas City, Kansas	Burk and another male suspect carjacked a vehicle from a woman in Kansas City, Missouri. A pursuit ensued after they refused to stop the car. About seventeen minutes later, the male suspect was in custody after he exited the vehicle in Kansas City, Kansas. Burk continued fleeing until he lost control following to a pit maneuver performed by the Kansas Highway Patrol. At some point, Burk opened fire at the police before being killed by return fire.
2024-05-27	Ensel Maclare-Urgelles (48)	Black	Austin, Texas	
2024-05-27	Willem Roman (46)	White	Keansburg, New Jersey	
2024-05-27	unidentified male	Unknown	Detroit, Michigan	
2024-05-27	Deanna "Dee Dee" D’Arco (19)	White	Sussex County, New Jersey	A female passenger died after a crash that involved an on-duty police officer.
2024-05-26	Roderick Hayes (29)	Black	Augusta, Georgia	
2024-05-26	William Dwayne Rankin (43)	Black	Florence County, South Carolina	Sheriff's deputies pursued Rankin after he fled a traffic stop. After crashing into a tree, Rankin fled into a home, followed by a deputy and a K-9 unit. The K-9, which was not leashed, began mauling the homeowner as the deputy shot Rankin, who was lying on a couch. The deputy was later charged with manslaughter for shooting Rankin and assault for not calling off the K-9.
2024-05-26	Ray Anthony Ross (30)	Black	Jacksonville, Florida	
2024-05-26	unidentified male	Unknown	Marion, Illinois	
2024-05-26	Richard Castillo (37)	Hispanic	Haskell County, Kansas	
2024-05-26	Andre Mayfield (26)	Black	Brooklyn, New York	Mayfield approached a NYPD officers with a knife. Two officers deployed tasers which caused him to fall. He then stood up with the knife and approached them again before being shot.
2024-05-26	Ed Lee Edwards III (48)	Black	Wilson, North Carolina	
2024-05-25	Jonathan Jurecki (44)	White	Otto Township, Michigan	
2024-05-25	Aaron Edward Gardner (41)	White	Grover Beach, California	Gardner, of Independence, Missouri, was shot and killed by Grover Beach police after he brandished a replica gun.
2024-05-24	Anthony Ferguson (39)	Black	Baltimore, Maryland	In South Baltimore, a Baltimore Police detective was speaking to a man sitting in front of a house when the man reportedly pulled out a firearm and shot the detective in the chest, whice was protected by a ballistic vest. Other officers then shot the man, who was later identified as 39-year-old Anthony Ferguson. Both Ferguson and the officer were taken to the hospital for treatment; Ferguson died a short time later. At the time, he was being questioned about a recent shooting incident in the area.
2024-05-24	Michael Aaron Vaughn (48)	Unknown	Auburn, Washington	
2024-05-24	unidentified male	Unknown	West Palm Beach, Florida	
2024-05-24	unidentified male	Hispanic	Fresno, California	Officers shot and killed a man after he approached the officers with a gun.
2024-05-24	Kedrayn Blueford (21)	Black	Spring, Texas	
2024-05-23	Kilyn Lewis (36)	Black	Aurora, Colorado	A SWAT team approached Lewis to arrest him in connection with a drive-by shooting in Denver earlier in the month. When officers approached, Lewis raised his hands in the air while holding a cellphone, and an SWAT officer shot him.
2024-05-23	Miguel Antonio Moreno (36)	Hispanic	St. Augustine Shores, Florida	
2024-05-23	Beau Daniel Purtee (23)	White	Perrysburg, Ohio	
2024-05-23	Terry Pfeffer (45)	White	Imperial, Missouri	In Saint Louis, Police attempted to pull over Pfeffer but Pfeffer sped, resulting in a vehicle pursuit. When the chase ending in a cul-de-sac, a shootout occurred and Pfeffer was killed. A female who was inside the truck with Pfeffer was arrested.
2024-05-23	Thomas Konvalin (38)	White	Rancho Cordova, California	A man fatally shot his elderly parents inside their residence. Afterwards, two SWAT officers from the Sacramento County Sheriff Office fatally shot him while they encountered him in the backyard, armed with a rifle.
2024-05-23	Salih Beslic (47)	White	Pasco, Washington	
2024-05-22	Malik Samuell Thompson (27)	Black	Wilmington, North Carolina	Thompson was shot and killed after firing shots at the officers whom were serving a warrant on him.
2024-05-22	George Jones III (22)	Black	Gulfport, Mississippi	When narcotics officers with the Gulfport Police Department observed a suspicious suspect and attempted to stop him, he fled and then aim a handgun at the officers. Officers then opened fire, killing him.
2024-05-21	Alfonso Gonzales (35)	Hispanic	Austin, Texas	APD officers reportedly spotted someone driving a stolen vehicle, they followed the vehicle to a store and realized the suspect had a gun. The SWAT team was then called to deal with the situation. After the suspect fired shots at the officers and started pouring lighter fluid into a container with a rag to create a Molotov cocktail, the officers shot and killed the suspect.
2024-05-21	Nelson Fabian Marrero Jr. (44)	Unknown	Jacksonville, Florida	The man was being pursued by U.S. Marshals because he was suspected of rape in South Carolina, as well as a homicide in Jacksonville. When they pulled the vehicle over and attempted to arrest him, officers shot and killed him under unknown circumstances. Officials said the suspect was armed, and the vehicle was stolen.
2024-05-20	Sifou Saimasina Sua (47)	Pacific Islander	Millcreek, Utah	Police officers responded to a call about a kidnapping and hostage situation. When they arrived, they saw that the suspect had a firearm, then they fatally shot him.
2024-05-20	unidentified male	Black	San Diego, California	After the man robbed a Morena market, he was found by the officers whom responded to the call. He continued to flee to an encampment and held a man as hostage by holding a knife to the man's neck. Three officers then fired their weapons during the standoff, fatally striking him. The hostage was not injured.
2024-05-20	Ervin Zacarias Agustin (23)	Unknown	Queens, New York	An NYPD officer driving a patrol vehicle struck and killed Agustin on the Van Wyck Expressway.
2024-05-19	Boston Thomas (21)	Black	Atlanta, Georgia	A Cobb County officer performed a PIT maneuver on a vehicle which fled a lawful traffic stop and led them on a high-speed chase. The vehicle spun out, overturned, and came to a stop on the Atlanta side of the river. The driver, Thomas, died as a result. The case was hidden by Cobb County Police for two years without any media release before Thomas' family filed a civil lawsuit in June 2026.
2024-05-19	Bradley Allen Moody (38)	Unknown	Ardmore, Oklahoma	Moody was struck and killed by a police vehicle when he was riding a bike.
2024-05-19	Wilver Blanco (42)	Hispanic	Los Angeles, California	LAPD officers responding to reports of an assault with a deadly weapon encountered a man who was reportedly armed with a knife. The officers mortally wounded the man after he refused commands to drop the knife and advanced towards them.
2024-05-19	Angel Gabriel Cuevas (21)	Hispanic	Bexar County, Texas	Police officers discovered a stolen vehicle after responded to an unrelated call. While the officers went to check on the complaint, Cuevas entered the stolen vehicle and drove toward them. Officers then discharged their weapons, fatally shot him.
2024-05-18	Olivia Flores (18)	White	Rochester, Minnesota	
2024-05-18	Gerald Pinckney (31)	Black	Greensboro, North Carolina	Pinckney, who was armed with a handgun, was shot and killed by police after refusing to drop his weapon.
2024-05-18	Laporshia Shanks (31)	Black	Gastonia, North Carolina	
2024-05-18	Michael Hurst (40)	White	Colorado Springs, Colorado	Police officers responded to a disturbance in Colorado Springs. Police stated that Hurst fired several shots inside the house and the neighborhood before being killed by return fire.
2024-05-18	Bernard Smith (28)	Black	Fort Pierce, Florida	Smith was fatally shot by Fort Pierce police officers after they encountered him while investigating a crime scene. Later the same day, two people were found deceased inside two homes with gunshot wounds. Police suspect Smith is involved in the two homicides.
2024-05-17	unidentified male (63)	Unknown	Galveston, Texas	An off-duty officer struck and killed a pedestrian.
2024-05-17	Clifford Jacoby Beck (40)	Unknown	Cobb County, Georgia	When officers stopped and blocked a stolen vehicle, Beck attempted to sped away but he failed. He then started pushing the gas back and forth and hitting several patrol cars. At some point, officers opened fire on him, fatally striking him.
2024-05-17	Eugene Mewes (80)	Unknown	East Moline, Illinois	Officers responded to a report about an 80-year-old resident fired a gun outside. Both Officers shot him when they arrived. The suspect died in the hospital on May 20th.
2024-05-16	Rafael E. Warfield (21)	Black	Columbus, Ohio	Officers responded to a man threatening to claim his own life and the lives of those who were in the house with him. When the officers arrived, it was reported that Warfield opened fire on them, which caused them to return fire, fatally striking him.
2024-05-16	Marvin Arellano (37)	Hispanic	Everett, Washington	A Washington state trooper fatally shot Arellano with a hammer who had attacked state Department of Transportation workers and rammed a Department of Transportation contractor vehicle during a road rage incident.
2024-05-16	Gregory Tracy (54)	White	Beloit, Wisconsin	
2024-05-16	Devin Gerrod Montgomery (23)	Black	Phoenix, Arizona	
2024-05-16	Andrew Scott Dale (35)	Unknown	Crookston, Minnesota	
2024-05-15	Joseph A. Ogle (59)	White	Jasper, Florida	
2024-05-15	Henry Allen Zartman (66)	White	Nakina, North Carolina	
2024-05-15	Kelvin Andrew Chandler (26)	Unknown	Indianapolis, Indiana	
2024-05-15	Everett Duriel Shockley (42)	Black	Arapahoe County, Colorado	
2024-05-15	Maurice White (40)	Black	Athens, Alabama	
2024-05-15	Elmer Noe Vargas Aviles (21)	Hispanic	Tulsa, Oklahoma	
2024-05-15	Reginald Folks (35)	Black	Union City, Georgia	An Atlanta Police officer called a Lyft rideshare after leaving another officer's home. During the ride, the officer shot the driver, Folks, in the head. The officer admitted to Union City Police that he shot the driver, and a witness told police that the officer claimed he shot Folks because he "is in a gay fraternity and was trying to recruit" him into it. He resigned shortly after his arrest.
2024-05-15	Adam Scott Phillips (33)	White	Logan, Utah	
2024-05-15	Fasutino Carette Jr. (33)	Hispanic	Roswell, New Mexico	
2024-05-14	Brandon Marroquin (17)	Hispanic	Louisville, Kentucky	When officers were observing a person of interest in one of the multiple homicides, they found and approached a suspect. The suspect presented a firearm and began to flee. The officers were able to tackle him and wrestle for the gun. At some point, the suspect fired one shot and an officer returned fire, striking him once. He was transport to the hospital where he died eight days later. Marroquin had been identified as a suspect in 18-year-old David Martinez’s death.
2024-05-14	Yazmyn Stewart (22)	Black	Chester, Pennsylvania	
2024-05-14	Brandon Martinez (26)	Hispanic	Thornton, Colorado	
2024-05-14	Robert Eugene Robinson (47)	Unknown	Bakersfield, California	
2024-05-14	Gaylord Angst (81)	White	Florence, Montana	
2024-05-14	Christopher Brian Couts (32)	Unknown	Missoula, Montana	
2024-05-14	Aubrey Osteen (77)	White	Quay County, New Mexico	
2024-05-14	Jason Scott Fletcher (51)	White	Carroll County, Georgia	When officers were investigating a mail theft, they encountered Fletcher in a car. Officers attempted to stop him but he ignored and a pursuit ensued. When a state trooper was deploying a spike strip in order to stop him, he sped toward the trooper before being fatally shot.
2024-05-14	Dennis Bodden (46)	Black	Pineville, North Carolina	Bodden, a shoplifting suspect, was shot and killed by an off-duty officer outside a Food Lion store following a fight, while attempting to grab the officer's gun.
2024-05-13	Lucas Michael Rutledge (42)	White	Perris, California	
2024-05-13	Ivory James Welch III (54)	Black	Greenlee County, Arizona	DPS troopers received a report of a possible sighting of Welch, who murdered his mother and two sisters. About three hours later, the troopers found him and pulled him over. Officers shot and killed him after he exited the vehicle with a firearm.
2024-05-13	Kristopher K. Handy (34)	White	Anchorage, Alaska	Officers responded to a domestic disturbance call. When they arrived, they encountered Handy with a firearm. Four officers then discharged their weapons, mortally wounding him.
2024-05-12	Jason Melvin Taylor (39)	White	Alexander County, North Carolina	Deputies were attempting to serve warrants on Taylor at a home. A fight ensued after deputies located him in the front yard. One of the deputies then fired his weapon, killing him.
2024-05-12	unidentified male (37)	Unknown	Ontario, California	
2024-05-12	Christian Emile (33)	Black	Brooklyn, New York	A man was shot and killed by police after he pulled out a gun during an argument.
2024-05-12	Nicholas Pierce (43)	White	Louisville, Kentucky	Pierce was shot after he came toward the officers with a knife in his hand. He was pronounced deceased 2 days later.
2024-05-11	Ali Hamsa Yusuf (22)	Black	Columbus, Ohio	Yusuf, a security guard at an Amazon warehouse, attempted to shoot his supervisor from behind, but the gun malfunctioned and the bullet narrowly missed. Yusuf fled and was later spotted by officers in Columbus. He shot and injured one officer before police shot and killed him.
2024-05-11	Claudy Pierre Jules (41)	Black	Atlanta, Georgia	Atlanta Police Department officers responded to a report about a man with a gun, when they arrived, they encountered Jules with a handgun. When officers tackled him and attempted to arrest him, he shot three of the officers before being shot and killed.
2024-05-11	Corey Roach (50)	Black	Columbus, Ohio	
2024-05-10	Edward Stevenson (60)	White	Donley County, Texas	
2024-05-10	Elizabeth Stevenson (51)	White	Donley County, Texas	
2024-05-10	Jordan Cole (18)	Unknown	Kansas City, Kansas	
2024-05-10	Joseph Reyes Munoz (38)	Hispanic	Midland, Texas	
2024-05-10	Alexander Yepez Ortega (22)	Hispanic	Ceres, California	
2024-05-10	unidentified male	Unknown	St. Louis, Missouri	
2024-05-10	Freeman Sherman, Jr. (39)	Black	Memphis, Tennessee	
2024-05-09	Nicholas Robert Contreras (32)	Hispanic	Victorville, California	
2024-05-08	Julian Giron (54)	Unknown	Lakewood, Colorado	
2024-05-08	Jason Norris (41)	White	North Ridgeville, Ohio	Norris allegedly shot and killed his girlfriend and stole her car. When police officers located and confronted him, he opened fire on them. Police officers then returned fire, fatally striking him.
2024-05-08	Ruben Felix Alejandro Lopez (45)	Hispanic	Chandler, Arizona	
2024-05-08	Jesse Hartman (39)	White	Galveston, Texas	
2024-05-08	Harman Davis (46)	White	Lincoln County, West Virginia	
2024-05-07	Jonathan Pritt Jr. (36)	Unknown	Nicholas County, West Virginia	
2024-05-07	Christopher Raymond Tavares (27)	Hispanic	Phoenix, Arizona	
2024-05-07	Anthony Ray Gamez (40)	White	Plant City, Florida	
2024-05-06	Justin Denver Grant	White	Greenbrier County, West Virginia	
2024-05-06	Richard Shawn Perez (45)	Unknown	Portland, Oregon	Portland Police officers fatally shot the man after he reportedly shot at them as they executed a search warrant at the man's residence.
2024-05-06	Pepsi Lee Heinl (41)	Native American	Saint Paul, Minnesota	
2024-05-06	John Kenney Dutton (70)	White	Abilene, Texas	
2024-05-05	Lemonte Anthony Knobelock (44)	White	Tempe, Arizona	
2024-05-05	Kelvin Markeith Moseley (30)	Black	Person County, North Carolina	Person County deputies encountered Moseley after receiving reports of Moseley waving a gun at passing vehicles. When the deputies reportedly commanded Moseley to drop his gun, he shot at the deputies. Deputy Johnny Clark then shot Moseley. Moseley later died at a hospital.
2024-05-05	Kenneth Allsen (46)	White	Oklahoma City, Oklahoma	
2024-05-05	Kevin Frey (44)	White	Turlock, California	Deputies responded to a report about a suspicious male had been trespassing and armed with a weapon, later identified as kevin Frey. Deputies shot and killed Frey after he refused to drop his firearm and charged at them without warning.
2024-05-05	Orlando Montes (39)	Hispanic	Ontario, California	Police responded to a domestic disturbance call at a home and encountered Montes, who was inside of a vehicle. When police learned that Montes had open warrants, they asked Montes to surrender to be arrested, but he declined and refused to exit his vehicle. At some point, Montes drove off, prompting a high speed chase. Shortly after exiting a freeway, Montes collided with multiple vehicles at an intersection. A woman in one of the cars died. Montes then attempted to carjack another vehicle, and was shot by police.
2024-05-05	Steven A. Wyman (47)	White	Milwaukee, Wisconsin	A man wanted for child abuse, was shot and killed by a Milwaukee County Sheriff's deputy near a dog park. The reason for the man being is shot is unclear.
2024-05-04	Kendrall Tate (27)	Black	Gulfport, Mississippi	Police were called to an apartment complex after reports of a stabbing. For reasons unknown, a fight broke out between Tate and a Gulfport Police officer and Tate was shot multiple times.
2024-05-04	Jose Luis Rodriguez-Balderrama (28)	Hispanic	Aurora, Colorado	
2024-05-04	Gerrone Avery (32)	Black	Atlanta, Georgia	An off-duty Spelman College police officer shot and killed a man near Magic City, a prominent strip club.
2024-05-03	Kendall Woodward (34)	Unknown	Dover, Ohio	
2024-05-03	Roger Fortson (23)	Black	Fort Walton Beach, Florida	United States Air Force member Fortson was shot and killed by an Okaloosa County sheriff's deputy at Fortson's home. The deputy involved was charged with manslaughter.
2024-05-03	Joseph Jacob Hadden (38)	Unknown	Port Angeles, Washington	
2024-05-03	Blake Fleure (19)	White	Tiffin, Ohio	Seneca County Sheriff's Office received a call that Fleure had harmed himself and was in a car. When they conducted a traffic stop for a welfare check, Fleure exited the car and charged a knife at them. Officers then discharged their service weapons, fatally striking him.
2024-05-02	Stephen Todd Sharp (37)	White	Colfax, California	Deputies on patrol found a van matching the description of a van connected to a burglary. When they talked to the man inside, at some point, the man brandished a gun and shot one of them. The deputies fired back and killed him.
2024-05-02	James Bennett (45)	Unknown	Billings, Montana	Police responded to reports of a man wielding a machete. When they arrived, they encountered Bennet with a machete and tried to subdue him with a taser. However, the taser was ineffective and Bennet began to reach for the machete. An officer then shot and killed him.
2024-05-02	Osbaldo Aguinaga (27)	Hispanic	Harris County, Texas	Deputies had responded to a Discharge of a Firearms call and learned that the suspect is Aguinaga, according to the witness. Officers then saw Aguinaga pointing a gun at the witness. They ordered him to drop the gun. However, Aguinaga opened fire on them. Both officers then fired their weapons fatally striking him.
2024-05-02	Charles David Boles (44)	White	Skyline, Alabama	Boles was shot and killed by Skyline police officers after firing shots and wounded one of them.
2024-05-02	Isabella North (29)	Hispanic	Hudson, Florida	At a pet cemetery, North was shot by a Pasco County Sheriff deputy after she walked towards the deputy with a knife.
2024-05-02	Yong Yang (40)	Asian	Los Angeles, California	In Koreatown, an LAPD officer shot a man who was armed with a knife.
2024-05-02	Zachariah Alexander White (32)	Unknown	Spring Garden Township, Pennsylvania	A man was fatally shot by a police officer inside of a nursing home.
2024-05-02	Rachel Rodriguez (24)	Unknown	Mesa, Arizona	Officers responded to a call stating that Rodriguez was armed with a knife preventing her roommate's boyfriend from leaving. When the police arrived, they tried to get Rodriguez out of the house, however, she entered the room. This is when officers shot and killed her.
2024-05-02	Lemar Brandon Qualls (35)	Black	Indianapolis, Indiana	Someone called police after a man threatened to shoot neighbors in the area. When police arrived, the man was on the porch of a house and at some point he allegedly pointed a firearm in the direction of the officers and was then shot.
2024-05-01	Joshua Richard (26)	White	Beech Grove, Indiana	Beech Grove officers responded to an apartment complex for a welfare check and were told there was an ongoing child custody dispute. When they arrived, they encountered a man that approached them with a knife. He was shot and killed after failing to comply with officers' orders.
2024-05-01	Emile Ciampicini (61)	White	Harris County, Texas	Multiple 911 callers reported Ciampicini was in the middle of a street stabbing himself, holding a large cross. When police arrived, Ciampicini threw the knife away but refused orders to get on the ground. He advanced, holding the cross aloft, seemingly beginning to run toward officers, who shot him.
2024-05-01	Damian Haglund (14)	Hispanic	Mount Horeb, Wisconsin	Following reports of a person with a rifle outside of Mount Horeb Middle School, A 14-year-boy was fatally shot by Mount Horeb police. The boy was reportedly armed with a pellet rifle.
2024-05-01	Larry Dean Woolsey (61)	White	Amarillo, Texas	Two Amarillo police officers fatally shot Woolsey when he raised a reciprocating saw at the officers. Initial reports said that the saw was a rifle.
2024-05-01	Raymond Huddleston (46)	Black	Saint Francisville, Louisiana	Two inmates were being transported in a van from Catahoula Correctional Center to Baton Rouge to a court hearing. Sometime during the drive, Huddleston reportedly faked a seizure, whice caused the transporting officers to pull over. Huddleston then attacked the officers when they opened the van's doors. A fight ensued and Huddleston was able to disarm one of the officers. He then jumped into the front driver’s seat. As he attempted to drive off, one officer shot into the van, causing Huddleston's death.

== See also ==
- Death in custody § United States
- Henry A. Wallace Police Crime Public Database
- List of cases of police brutality
- List of countries with annual rates and counts for killings by law enforcement officers
- List of law enforcement officers killed in the line of duty in the United States
- List of law enforcement officers convicted for an on-duty killing in the United States
- List of shootings by US immigration agents
- List of police reforms related to the George Floyd protests
- List of unarmed African Americans killed by law enforcement officers in the United States
- Lists of killings by law enforcement officers
- Police brutality in the United States
- Police misconduct § United States
- Police riot § United States
- Police use of deadly force in the United States
