= Guideway, North Carolina =

Unincorporated community in United States

- Unincorporated community
- Interactive map of Guideway, North Carolina
- Country: United States
- State: North Carolina
- County: Columbus

Guideway is an unincorporated community in Columbus County, North Carolina, United States.

== Geography ==
The community is located in southern Columbus County, northwest of Pireway. Guideway is approximately a 30-minute drive from North Myrtle Beach, South Carolina.

== Transportation ==
North Carolina Highway 904 is the primary route in Guideway.
