= Olyphic, North Carolina =

Unincorporated community in North Carolina, US

Coordinates: 33°59′28″N 78°39′32″W

Olyphic is an unincorporated community in Columbus County, North Carolina, United States, located south of Pireway. It lies on North Carolina Highway 905, north of the South Carolina border. Its elevation above sea level is reported as 39 feet or 12 meters.
