= Black Rock Plantation House =

Historic house in North Carolina, United States

- U.S. National Register of Historic Places
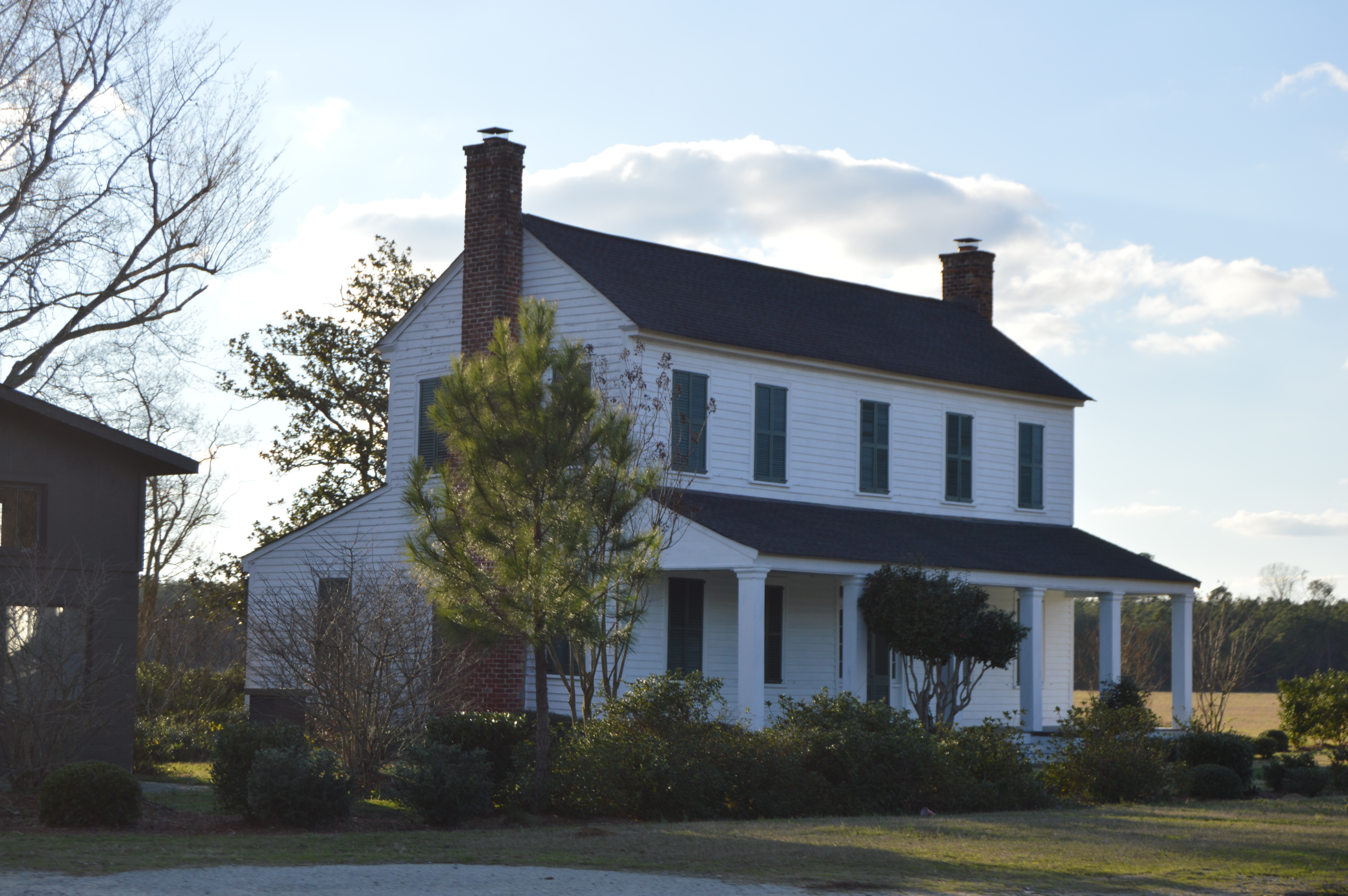
- Front and eastern side

- Location within North Carolina Location within the United States
- Location: 7875 North Carolina Highway 87, near Riegelwood, North Carolina
- Coordinates: 34°23′3″N 78°17′30″W
- Area: 1 acre (0.40 ha)
- Built: c. 1845
- Architectural style: Federal, Greek Revival
- NRHP reference No.: 14000492
- Added to NRHP: August 18, 2014

Black Rock Plantation House, also known as the Allen-Love House, is a historic plantation house located near Riegelwood, Columbus County, North Carolina. It was built about 1845, and is a two-story, five-bay, braced frame I-house with Federal / Greek Revival style interior design elements. The house is sheathed in weatherboard and has a gable roof. It has a rear shed roof addition and a replacement one-story shed roofed front porch. The house was renovated in 2013.

It was listed on the National Register of Historic Places in 2014.
