= North Carolina Highway 905 =

State highway in Columbus County, North Carolina, US

North Carolina Highway 905

Route information
- Maintained by NCDOT
- Length: 20.9 mi (33.6 km)
- Existed: 1958–present

Major junctions
- South end: SC 905 at the South Carolina state line in Olyphic
- North end: NC 130 in Pleasant Plains

Location
- Country: United States
- State: North Carolina
- Counties: Columbus

Highway system
- North Carolina Highway System; Interstate; US; State; Scenic
← NC 904	→ NC 906

North Carolina Highway 905 (NC 905) is a primary state highway in the U.S. state of North Carolina. It serves as part of an alternate route between Whiteville and Conway, South Carolina, through southeastern Columbus County.

== Route description ==
NC 905 is a two-lane rural highway that begins at the South Carolina line and South Carolina Highway 905 (SC 905) in Olyphic. Traveling north, it connects with NC 904 in Pireway. After its six-tenths-mile (0.97 km) concurrency with NC 904, it continues solo for 15.1 miles (24.3 km), connecting the communities of Bug Hill and Nakina, until it ends at NC 130 in Pleasant Plains.

The route is part of a larger alternate route to U.S. Route 701 between Whiteville, North Carolina and Conway, South Carolina via NC 130 and SC 905. From 1958 to 2016, it was the highest number signed as a primary route in North Carolina.

== History ==
NC 905 was established around 1958 as an extension of SC 905, which had ended at the state line since around 1942. Its route from Olyphic to Pleasant Plains has remained unchanged since.

== Junction list ==
The entire route is in Columbus County.

Location	mi	km	Destinations	Notes
Olyphic	0.0	0.0	SC 905 south – Longs	Continuation into South Carolina
Pireway	4.5	7.2	NC 904 east – Longwood	East end of NC 904 overlap
Pireway	5.1	8.2	NC 904 west – Tabor City	West end of NC 904 overlap
Pleasant Plains	20.9	33.6	NC 130 – Shallotte, Whiteville	
1.000 mi = 1.609 km; 1.000 km = 0.621 mi
