= Robert Sylvester Alston =

American serial killer

- Born: May 19, 1969 (age 57); Greensboro, North Carolina, U.S.
- Convictions: Second degree murder (4 counts); Rape; Kidnapping
- Penalty: Life imprisonment

Details
- Victims: 4–6
- Span of crimes: 1991–1993
- Country: United States
- State: North Carolina
- Date apprehended: January 28, 1994
- Imprisoned at: Columbus Correctional Institution, Brunswick, North Carolina

Robert Sylvester Alston (born May 19, 1969) is an American serial killer who raped and murdered at least four women in Greensboro, North Carolina from 1991 to 1993, whose bodies he then dismembered and buried in various locations. He made anonymous phone calls to investigators about the crimes in an attempt to confuse them and gain media attention. He pleaded guilty to all charges in 1998 and received multiple life sentences.

== Biography ==
Robert Sylvester Alston was born on May 19, 1969, in Greensboro, North Carolina. The son of school custodian Jack and factory worker Dorothy Alston, he was one of two children born to a poor but otherwise stable and respected family.

Alston attended the local Grimsley High School, where he developed a reputation as a social outcast due to his introverted nature, having trouble interacting with his peers and having no close friends. Although he was tall and reasonably athletic, he did not participate in any extracurricular or social activities aside from the Reserve Officers' Training Corps, to which he barely paid attention. After his graduation in 1987, Alston went to a junior college in Georgia, but quickly lost interest in the education and dropped out after the first semester. During this period, he developed an intimate relationship with a woman, and in 1989, she gave birth to a son.

Alston and his girlfriend then moved to Wilmington, Delaware, where they had a second child born in 1991. Shortly afterwards, Alston got into a conflict with his partner and abandoned his family, returning to his parents' home in Greensboro, where he had low-skilled jobs over the next several years. He changed a number of jobs and, at the time of his arrest in 1994, worked as a dishwasher at the Rock-Ola Cafe on Battleground Avenue. He avoided deep emotional connections to everyone, including his own parents, and spent most of his time in his room or walking around the neighborhood. After his arrest, his father told reporters that there was little to no emotional intimacy or trust between them.

== Murders ==
As victims, Alston chose young black women who were either prostitutes or drug addicts, all of whom he picked up in his dark blue Pontiac. His first confirmed murder occurred in April 1991, when he strangled 23-year-old JoAnne Robinson, a prostitute addicted to crack cocaine. Her naked body was found several blocks from his home.

Alston committed his second murder in October of that year, strangling 26-year-old Sharon Martin. According to investigators, he dismembered her corpse post-mortem and then scattered the remains in various areas of Greensboro. By late November, utility workers found her severed head and one of her hands in a wooded area on a street near the Jackson Middle School.

The third murder occurred sometime during the spring of 1992, when the naked and decapitated body of 19-year-old Shameca Warren was discovered by police officers at a vacant lot near Alston's home. Warren, a prostitute suffering from drug addiction, had been reported missing by her relatives in May.

Alston's last confirmed murder took place sometime in early-to-mid December 1993, when he raped and strangled 41-year-old Lois Elizabeth Williams. After killing her, Alston dumped her body in the city's Piedmont National Cemetery, where it was found on December 14. Like all the previous victims, Williams began to use crack cocaine and engage in prostitution after losing her job, having worked as a manager for the News & Record. While interviewing witnesses, investigators learned that she had last been seen in the company of a black male who appeared to be approximately 6 feet tall and about 185 pounds. Both Williams' and Warren's bodies were later recovered after an anonymous caller submitted tips to the police.

== Arrest, confessions, and recovery of remains ==
In early January 1994, Alston met a 29-year-old woman in Guilford County, who was trying to hitchhike home to Greensboro. He offered her a ride, but when she got in the car, he drove to a forested area near the James B. Dudley High School where he proceeded to assault, beat, rape and attempt to strangle her. After the victim lost consciousness, Alston threw her off a bridge into the waters of a nearby river, but the victim survived. She was quickly found and driven to a hospital, where she managed to recover. She later told police officers what had happened and offered a description, on the basis of which a facial composite was devised.

At the police station, the victim was presented with photographs of previously convicted men, choosing one that she thought resembled her attacker: that of Robert Alston. Although he had never been arrested up until that point, he was questioned on multiple occasions and considered a suspect due to the fact that most of the victims were found near his house. Alston was finally arrested on January 28, 1994, and was thereafter positively identified as the assailant of the hitchhiker. Shortly after this, he unexpectedly confessed to investigators that he had murdered Lois Williams.

On April 18, based on his confession, Alston was convicted and sentenced to life imprisonment for the Williams murder. He remained a suspect in the other crimes, but denied any involvement until 1996, when he contacted the Guilford County Prosecutor's Office and confessed to killing JoAnne Robinson. Alston was then charged, convicted and given another life term for her murder on August 19, 1996.

In late 1997, Alston contacted the Prosecutor's Office yet again, this time claiming responsibility for the murders of Sharon Martin and Shameca Warren. Although investigators were unable to uncover any evidence directly linking him to these two cases, he was nonetheless indicted for both in January 1998. During interrogations, Alston refused to reveal his true motives or point out where he had buried the women's remains, which were eventually recovered thanks to tips submitted by an anonymous caller. Investigators believed that Alston was the caller, but he denied it was him.

== Trial and sentence ==
On September 3, 1998, Alston pleaded guilty to all charges, after which he received two life sentences. While all four of his life sentences carried the chance of parole after 20 years, they were ordered to run consecutively, thus making ineligible for parole for 80 years. At sentencing, Alston smiled while describing his crimes in sarcastic detail and showed no signs of remorse. At one point, he was asked by the judge and Warren's mother to reveal the location of her remains, but he turned this request down, stating the following: "I have had time to search my soul. What I did was wrong and I've made peace with God. Only me and God will have those answers."

After his conviction, Alston was identified as the prime suspect in the murders of two other women—Bernice Denise Robinson and Cheryl Lynn Mason—who had been murdered and raped in Greensboro between 1991 and 1993; however, he was never charged in either killing. The murders of Robinson and Mason remain unsolved.

== Status ==
Since his conviction, Alston has remained in jail, being frequently transferred around various penitentiaries across the state. In the mid-2010s, he was visited twice by journalists. In one interview, he stated that he was responsible for more than four murders, but was unwilling to cooperate with the Guilford County prosecutors. In 2016, he was interviewed by Nancy McLaughlin, a journalist for the News & Record. In that interview, he said the following: "I won't feed anyone's fascination with my crimes. That trigger, that one thing that pushed me over the edge, I'll die with that... I don't see myself as a serial killer, but people do. Society is so quick to put monikers on people, name tags. Robert Alston. That's who I am."

In 2002, the Greensboro Medical Examiner's Office was ordered to pay $50,000 in fines to the family of Sharon Martin after her remains were lost. The chief examiner, John Butts, later released a statement apologizing for the mix-up.

As of August 2026, Alston is serving his sentence at the Columbus Correctional Institution in Brunswick, North Carolina.

== See also ==
- List of serial killers in the United States
