= Powell House (Fair Bluff, North Carolina) =

Historic house in North Carolina, United States

- U.S. National Register of Historic Places
- Location within North Carolina Location within the United States
- Location: Main and Orange Streets, Fair Bluff, North Carolina
- Coordinates: 34°18′42″N 79°2′27″W
- Area: less than one acre
- Built: 1803
- Architectural style: Federal, Vernacular Federal
- NRHP reference No.: 78001940
- Added to NRHP: January 31, 1978

Powell House, also known as The Trading Post and Wooten-Powell House, is a historic home located in Fair Bluff, Columbus County, North Carolina. The original section was built about 1803, and consisted of two equal-sized rooms. Its architectural style is vernacular Federal. It has several mid-to-late 19th century additions, which were made in several stages. The house, a rambling one-story frame building, which is located on the east side of Main Street at the corner of Orange Street, is said to have functioned as a commercial outpost in the 19th century. It is one of the oldest buildings in Columbus County.

It was listed on the National Register of Historic Places on January 31, 1978, with its periods of significance being in the timeframes of 1800–1824 and 1825–1849. The building's areas of significance are commerce and exploration/settlement. Its architect is officially unknown; however, it was reported by local tradition to have been built by John Wooten in about 1803, and to have served the Lumber River community of Fair Bluff as a trading center for the next half century.
