= Cherry Grove, North Carolina =

Cherry Grove, North Carolina may refer to:

- Cherry Grove, Caswell County, North Carolina, an unincorporated community
- Cherry Grove, Columbus County, North Carolina, an unincorporated community
