= Riverview, North Carolina =

Crusoe Island, North Carolina
- Unincorporated community
- Nickname: Crusoe
- Location within North Carolina Location within the United States
- Coordinates: 34°11′16″N 78°33′29″W
- Country: United States
- State: North Carolina
- County: Columbus
- Elevation: 39 ft (12 m)
- Time zone: UTC-5 (Eastern (EST))
  - Summer (DST): UTC-4 (EDT)
- postal code: 28472
- Area codes: 910, 472
- GNIS feature ID: 1019876

Crusoe Island (Registered as Riverview and locally known as just Crusoe) is an unincorporated community home to just a few families in The Green Swamp bordering the Waccamaw River and just south of Lake Waccamaw in Columbus County, North Carolina, United States.
