= Guideway =

In the context of transport, a guideway is track or similar structure that guides a vehicle along a pre-defined route. Technologies using a guideway include:

- Automated guideway transit – Fully automated transit system
- Guided bus – Type of bus
- Hovertrain – Type of high-speed train
- Maglev – Train system using magnetic levitation
- Monorail – Railway with a single rail or beam
- People mover – Automated small-scale transit systems
- Personal rapid transit – Public transport mode

== Other uses ==
- Way (machine tool element) – Type of linear bearing on a machine tool
- Guideway, North Carolina – Unincorporated community in United States

== See also ==
- Railway track – Rail infrastructure
