= Fair Bluff, North Carolina =

- Town
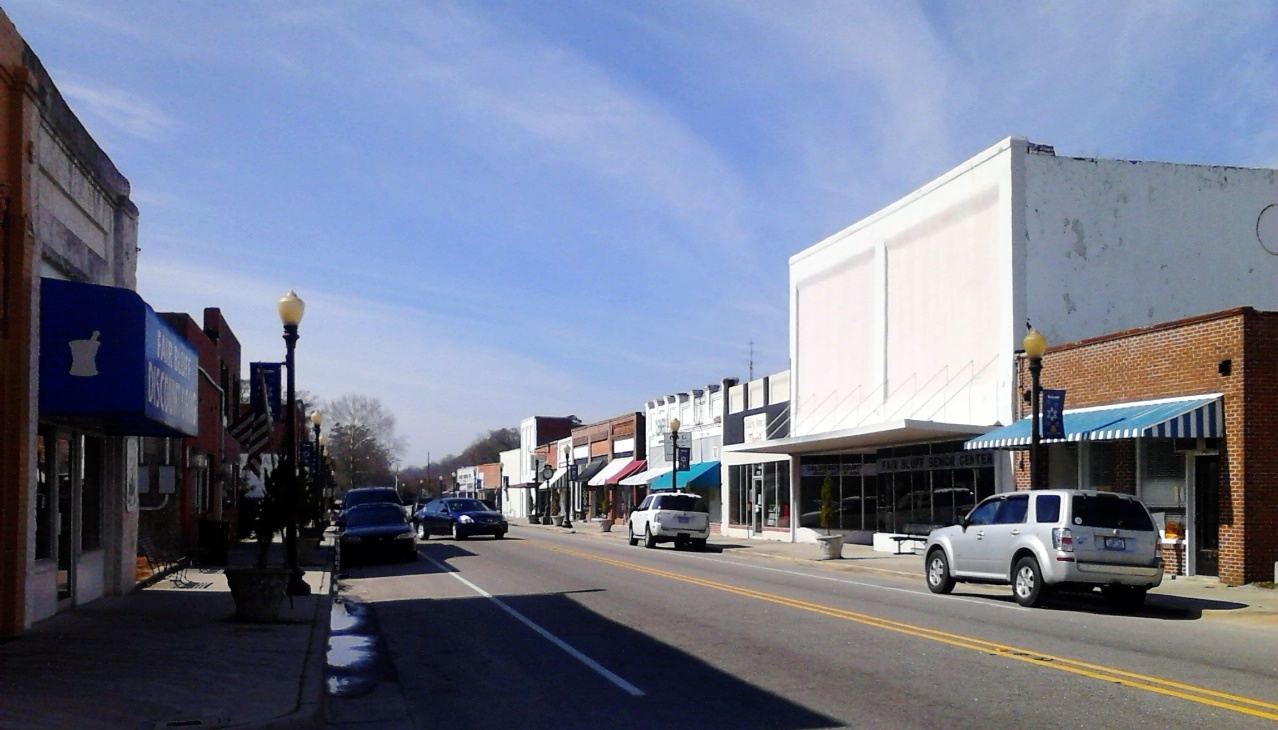
- Downtown Fair Bluff Before Demolition

- Location within the state of North Carolina
- Coordinates: 34°18′45″N 79°1′59″W
- Country: United States
- State: North Carolina
- County: Columbus

Government
  - Mayor: Billy Hammond

Area
  - Total: 2.36 sq mi (6.11 km^{2})
  - Land: 2.36 sq mi (6.11 km^{2})
  - Water: 0 sq mi (0.00 km^{2})
- Elevation: 62 ft (19 m)

Population (2020)
  - Total: 709
  - Density: 300.5/sq mi (116.04/km^{2})
- Time zone: UTC-5 (Eastern (EST))
  - Summer (DST): UTC-4 (EDT)
- ZIP code: 28439
- Area codes: 910, 472
- FIPS code: 37-22240
- GNIS feature ID: 2406477
- Website: http://www.fairbluff.com/

Fair Bluff is a town in Columbus County, North Carolina, United States. The population was 709 at the 2020 census.

== History ==
Fair Bluff was the name originally given to a bluff overlooking the Lumber River. In 1807, plans were made to build a town upon the lands of John Wooton at the bluff to be known as Wootonton. The town was established but the name was never changed. The community was reincorporated in 1873.

The Powell House was listed on the National Register of Historic Places in 1978.

Agriculture has always been a mainstay of the economy in the town. Tobacco was a major commodity grown in the area. By the 1980s, tobacco growing subsided. This caused a shift for the town and its citizens. The downtown continued to thrive until the late 1980s when a car dealership moved from the business district to another location. Haphazard town planning saw a mixture of residential, business, and industry all over town. Tens of millions in U.S. government grants poured into the city beginning in the mid-1980s until present day. But the town continued to decline and people left for better opportunities elsewhere. The decline in Fair Bluff was similar to neighboring towns of Tabor City, Boardman, Brunswick, Cerro Gordo, and Chadbourn. A town manager was hired to handle administrative duties of the town.

In 1999, Fair Bluff experienced a devastating flood event, caused by Hurricane Floyd.

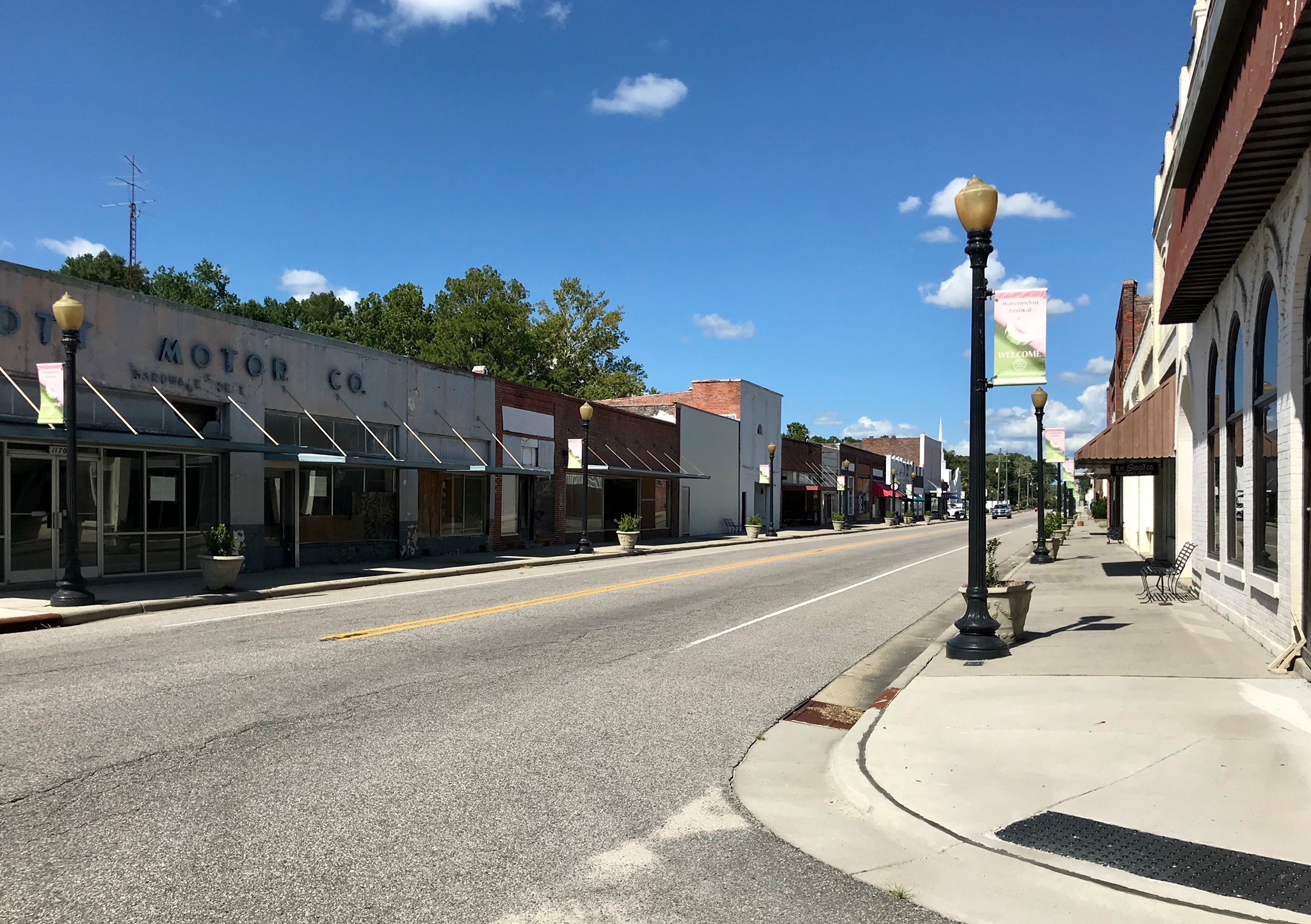
Downtown Fair Bluff, largely deserted in 2020

In 2012, the Police Chief of Fair Bluff Marty Lewis was arrested, tried and convicted for selling and delivering oxycodone and possession with the intent to sell and conspiracy to traffic while acting as police chief. He was sentenced to a minimum of seven years in prison and fined $100,000. On April 9, 2015, Marty Lewis filled an appeal of his case. On November 3, 2015, the verdict was unanimously affirmed by the North Carolina Court of Appeals, leaving in place the 90 to 117-month prison sentence originally imposed. Lewis will not be eligible for parole before November 2022.

In October 2016, the town was devastated by flooding on the Lumber River caused by Hurricane Matthew, prompting the evacuation of hundreds of residents. Floodwaters reached the town hall, police department, fire department, a grocery store, and a school.

In September 2018, Fair Bluff was flooded again by the impact of Hurricane Florence, forcing evacuations and leaving the downtown area under water, destroying 72 homes. After Florence, many buildings in the downtown area of the town were left abandoned, with no plans to reoccupy or repair them. The town's only factory closed several months later, and hundreds of residents moved away. The federal government bought out residential properties in the community, straining the local government tax base. The town government drew up plans to level the historic business district and turn it into a park, and build a new business district further away from the Lumber River.

== Government ==
Fair Bluff has a part-time town manager, assisted by the elected town mayor and town council. The town manager also works for five other deteriorating towns in Columbus County.

Fair Bluff is in the 13th District for the North Carolina Senate, represented by Michael Walters as of September 2014, and in the 46th district for the North Carolina House of Representatives, where, as of September 2021, they are represented by Tabor City native and used car dealer Brenden Jones.

== Geography ==
Fair Bluff is located at 34°18′40″N 79°1′57″W (34.311212, -79.032387), The town lies within the Carolina Border Belt, a regional network of tobacco markets and warehouses along both sides of the North Carolina-South Carolina border.

According to the United States Census Bureau, the town has a total area of 2.2 square miles (5.7 km^{2}), all land.

== Demographics ==
Historical population
Census	Pop.	Note	%±
1880	218		—
1890	243		11.5%
1900	328		35.0%
1910	441		34.5%
1920	397		−10.0%
1930	806		103.0%
1940	970		20.3%
1950	1,056		8.9%
1960	1,030		−2.5%
1970	1,039		0.9%
1980	1,095		5.4%
1990	1,068		−2.5%
2000	1,181		10.6%
2010	951		−19.5%
2020	709		−25.4%
2022 (est.)	716	▲	1.0%
U.S. Decennial Census

=== Racial and ethnic composition ===
Fair Bluff town, North Carolina – Racial and ethnic composition Note: the US Census treats Hispanic/Latino as an ethnic category. This table excludes Latinos from the racial categories and assigns them to a separate category. Hispanics/Latinos may be of any race.
Race / Ethnicity (NH = Non-Hispanic)	Pop 2000	Pop 2010	Pop 2020	% 2000	% 2010	% 2020
White alone (NH)	447	314	247	37.85%	33.02%	34.84%
Black or African American alone (NH)	700	605	416	59.27%	63.62%	58.67%
Native American or Alaska Native alone (NH)	8	5	8	0.68%	0.53%	1.13%
Asian alone (NH)	0	0	0	0.00%	0.00%	0.00%
Native Hawaiian or Pacific Islander alone (NH)	0	0	1	0.00%	0.00%	0.14%
Other race alone (NH)	0	0	3	0.00%	0.00%	0.42%
Mixed race or Multiracial (NH)	9	7	23	0.76%	0.74%	3.24%
Hispanic or Latino (any race)	17	20	11	1.44%	2.10%	1.55%
Total	1,181	951	709	100.00%	100.00%	100.00%

As of the census of 2000, there were 1,181 people, 505 households, and 308 families residing in the town. The population density was 547.4 inhabitants per square mile (211.4/km^{2}). There were 588 housing units at an average density of 272.6 per square mile (105.3/km^{2}). The racial makeup of the town was 59.27% African American, 37.93% White, 0.68% Native American, 1.19% from other races, and 0.93% from two or more races. Hispanic or Latino of any race were 1.44% of the population.

There were 505 households, out of which 26.7% had children under the age of 18 living with them, 37.2% were married couples living together, 20.8% had a female householder with no husband present, and 39.0% were non-families. 36.0% of all households were made up of individuals, and 19.8% had someone living alone who was 65 years of age or older. The average household size was 2.32 and the average family size was 2.98.

In the town, the population was spread out, with 25.2% under the age of 18, 7.6% from 18 to 24, 24.1% from 25 to 44, 23.6% from 45 to 64, and 19.4% who were 65 years of age or older. The median age was 39 years. For every 100 females, there were 77.3 males. For every 100 females age 18 and over, there were 72.5 males.

The median income for a household in the town was $17,008, and the median income for a family was $22,969. Males had a median income of $20,764 versus $16,731 for females. The per capita income for the town was $9,829. About 31.8% of families and 37.1% of the population were below the poverty line, including 50.9% of those under age 18 and 24.3% of those age 65 or over.

== Works cited ==
- Powell, William S. (1976). The North Carolina Gazetteer: A Dictionary of Tar Heel Places. Chapel Hill: The University of North Carolina Press. ISBN 9780807812471.
