= Longwood, North Carolina =

- Unincorporated community
- Location within North Carolina Location within the United States
- Coordinates: 34°00′13″N 78°32′32″W
- Country: United States
- State: North Carolina
- County: Brunswick
- Elevation: 46 ft (14 m)
- Time zone: UTC-5 (Eastern (EST))
  - Summer (DST): UTC-4 (EDT)
- ZIP code: 28452
- Area codes: 910, 472
- GNIS feature ID: 989023

Longwood is an unincorporated community in Brunswick County, North Carolina, United States. The community is located on North Carolina Highway 904, 8.6 miles (13.8 km) north of Sunset Beach. Longwood has a post office with ZIP code 28452.

Mt. Zion Missionary Baptist Church is an important part of this community, founded in 1886 over Butler's Mill Pond under an oak tree. Longwood Head Start Center originally operated by Sencland Community Action, Inc., came under the umbrella of Southeastern Community & Family Services, Inc., in 1987. Longwood currently has a Dollar General Store.

== History ==
William Asbury "Jinx" Long was raised in the Seaside/Calabash area. He apprenticed at the Brooks store in the Seaside area later opening his own general store. His store was on Butler's Pea Landing Road (the location of which would now be the intersection of NC 904 and Russtown Road, near Butler's Pond). A traveling photographer stopped by the store to deliver prints to a prominent local family. Jinx Long saw a photo of Bessie Lee Butler and announced, "That's the woman I'm going to marry." Her family had significant land holdings in the area. On February 24, 1907, they did just that, at the home of Bessie's mother and stepfather, Mary Melvina Cox Butler McKeithan and Isiah McKeithan. They had several children together, many of whose descendants still live in the area.

By the late 1910s and early 1920s times were getting more difficult for the Long family. Store patrons were not paying off their accounts and Mr. Long couldn't collect the money he was owed. They owned lots of land in the area, but had no money. Jinx and Bessie began selling their land to pay their creditors. Among the most eager to buy land: Jackson Brothers Railroad and Lumber Co., which was already laying railroad tracks in the swamps and forests of southeastern North Carolina and hauling out timber. Around 1922 Jackson Brothers took over the mill on Butler's Pond and began clearing timber. It laid out a settlement nearby for its workers, on streets and avenues with names such as "Peachtree" and "Sunset", and called the community Long's Wood: after the family who had sold the land. The community thrived as workers began to move in, hoping for steady work and a good paycheck.

In 1925 a "Longwood" post office application was proposed to serve a community of 500 people. Several entrepreneurs came as well, like Rice Gwynn of Fairmont. He opened a store and established a large farm in the area. Jackson Brothers stayed around 10 years, gradually pulling out in the early 1930s. The stores stayed open and Jackson Brothers sold the newly cleared acreage for farmland. On June 15, 1939, services of what became Longwood Baptist Church began in a dwelling house, with a church being completed in 1940. Longwood Road was the main street for the community and was once lined with a tractor dealership, a gas company, several garages and general stores, as well as, a hardware store for shopping. In the 1950s, Geneva Boyd's Longwood Grill was a popular hangout for teenagers. In 1984 there were discussions about possible incorporation. Most of the businesses have closed with many young people leaving to seek jobs.

In September 2002, the Longwood Community Action Group was founded. They have organized clean-up days, petitioned the county for increased assistance and held Family and Friends Day, featuring a health fair and career information. Mr. Freddie Stevenson has done a lot for the community.

== Climate ==
Climate data for Longwood, North Carolina (1991–2020 normals, extremes 1972–present)
| Month | Jan | Feb | Mar | Apr | May | Jun | Jul | Aug | Sep | Oct | Nov | Dec | Year |
|---|---|---|---|---|---|---|---|---|---|---|---|---|---|
| Record high °F (°C) | 84 (29) | 83 (28) | 88 (31) | 94 (34) | 99 (37) | 101 (38) | 102 (39) | 103 (39) | 98 (37) | 95 (35) | 87 (31) | 82 (28) | 103 (39) |
| Mean maximum °F (°C) | 74.0 (23.3) | 74.8 (23.8) | 81.2 (27.3) | 84.8 (29.3) | 90.6 (32.6) | 94.0 (34.4) | 96.0 (35.6) | 94.5 (34.7) | 90.3 (32.4) | 85.1 (29.5) | 79.7 (26.5) | 74.6 (23.7) | 97.3 (36.3) |
| Mean daily maximum °F (°C) | 55.8 (13.2) | 58.5 (14.7) | 65.1 (18.4) | 73.0 (22.8) | 79.6 (26.4) | 85.2 (29.6) | 88.2 (31.2) | 86.8 (30.4) | 82.4 (28.0) | 74.4 (23.6) | 65.5 (18.6) | 58.6 (14.8) | 72.8 (22.7) |
| Daily mean °F (°C) | 45.1 (7.3) | 47.4 (8.6) | 53.5 (11.9) | 61.4 (16.3) | 69.4 (20.8) | 76.6 (24.8) | 80.1 (26.7) | 78.7 (25.9) | 73.8 (23.2) | 63.8 (17.7) | 54.0 (12.2) | 47.8 (8.8) | 62.6 (17.0) |
| Mean daily minimum °F (°C) | 34.4 (1.3) | 36.3 (2.4) | 41.8 (5.4) | 49.8 (9.9) | 59.1 (15.1) | 67.9 (19.9) | 72.0 (22.2) | 70.6 (21.4) | 65.3 (18.5) | 53.1 (11.7) | 42.5 (5.8) | 37.0 (2.8) | 52.5 (11.4) |
| Mean minimum °F (°C) | 17.7 (−7.9) | 21.9 (−5.6) | 26.0 (−3.3) | 33.7 (0.9) | 43.9 (6.6) | 55.5 (13.1) | 63.5 (17.5) | 61.6 (16.4) | 52.8 (11.6) | 36.3 (2.4) | 26.2 (−3.2) | 21.9 (−5.6) | 16.0 (−8.9) |
| Record low °F (°C) | 0 (−18) | 5 (−15) | 5 (−15) | 21 (−6) | 32 (0) | 44 (7) | 47 (8) | 46 (8) | 35 (2) | 18 (−8) | 19 (−7) | −4 (−20) | −4 (−20) |
| Average precipitation inches (mm) | 3.70 (94) | 3.64 (92) | 3.78 (96) | 3.36 (85) | 3.98 (101) | 5.17 (131) | 5.91 (150) | 7.36 (187) | 7.53 (191) | 5.05 (128) | 3.69 (94) | 3.85 (98) | 57.02 (1,448) |
| Average snowfall inches (cm) | 0.2 (0.51) | 0.3 (0.76) | 0.0 (0.0) | 0.0 (0.0) | 0.0 (0.0) | 0.0 (0.0) | 0.0 (0.0) | 0.0 (0.0) | 0.0 (0.0) | 0.0 (0.0) | 0.0 (0.0) | 0.0 (0.0) | 0.5 (1.3) |
| Average precipitation days (≥ 0.01 in) | 11.1 | 10.1 | 9.4 | 8.4 | 9.9 | 11.9 | 12.9 | 14.3 | 11.5 | 8.4 | 8.3 | 11.0 | 127.2 |
| Average snowy days (≥ 0.1 in) | 0.2 | 0.1 | 0.0 | 0.0 | 0.0 | 0.0 | 0.0 | 0.0 | 0.0 | 0.0 | 0.0 | 0.0 | 0.3 |
Source: NOAA

== Notable people ==
Phil Flowers- Singer and Songwriter
