= Nakina, North Carolina =

Unincorporated community in North Carolina, US

Nakina
- Unincorporated community
- Location within the state of North Carolina
- Coordinates: 34.13°N 78.66°W
- Country: United States
- State: North Carolina
- County: Columbus
- Elevation: 43 ft (13 m)

Population
  - Estimate (2022): 2,245
- Time zone: UTC-5 (Eastern Standard Time)
  - Summer (DST): UTC-4 (Eastern Daylight Time)
- ZIP Code: 28455
- Area codes: 910, 472

Nakina is an unincorporated community in Columbus County, North Carolina, United States. It lies on North Carolina Highway 905 north of Pireway, at an elevation of 43 feet (13 m).

Positioned just north of the North Carolina–South Carolina border, Nakina was historically renowned for its high-quality flue-cured tobacco production until the 1990s.

The estimated population of Nakina in 2022 was 2,245.

The ZIP Code for Nakina is 28455.
