= Cherry Grove, Columbus County, North Carolina =

Cherry Grove, North Carolina
- Unincorporated community
- Location within North Carolina Location within the United States
- Coordinates: 34°14′19″N 78°57′56″W
- Country: United States
- State: North Carolina
- County: Columbus
- Elevation: 98 ft (30 m)
- Time zone: UTC-5 (Eastern (EST))
  - Summer (DST): UTC-4 (EDT)
- Area codes: 910, 472
- GNIS feature ID: 1006160

Cherry Grove is an unincorporated community in southern Columbus County, North Carolina, United States, south of Cerro Gordo, and northwest of Tabor City, on North Carolina Highway 904, at an elevation of 102 feet (31 m).
