= Sellerstown, North Carolina =

Unincorporated community in North Carolina, US

Coordinates: 34.275°N 78.695°W

Sellerstown is an Unincorporated community in Columbus County, North Carolina, United States, 7 miles (11 km) from Whiteville. As of 2011, Sellerstown has 50 residents.
