= Columbus Correctional Institution =

Prison in North Carolina, US

Coordinates: 34°16′40″N 78°43′00″W

- Interactive map of Columbus Correctional Institution
- Location: 1255 Prison Camp Road Whiteville, North Carolina
- Status: Operational
- Security class: Medium
- Capacity: 698
- Managed by: North Carolina Department of Correction
- Warden: Jennifer Walsh

The Columbus Correctional Institution (also CCI or CCDC) is a medium security prison for adult males, near Brunswick, North Carolina. The prison's original dormitory block, built during the late 1930s, is still in use. During the 1970s inmates under the supervision of correction engineers built a recreation area including a 28 cell unit to house inmates who had been placed under administrative and/or disciplinary segregation.

The facility offers adult education and GED preparation classes. Inmates may take courses on substance abuse. The total staff is 241 (as of February 2017) and has a maximum inmate capacity of just under 700.

== Notable Inmates ==
Inmate Name	Register Number	Status	Details
Robert Sylvester Alston	0006572	Serving a life sentence.	Raped and murdered 4 women from 1991 to 1993.

== See also ==
- List of North Carolina state prisons
