= Five Forks, Robeson County, North Carolina =

Unincorporated community in North Carolina, US

Coordinates: 34°28′18″N 79°12′01″W

Five Forks is an unincorporated community in Robeson County, North Carolina, United States, at the western terminus of North Carolina Highway 904, west-southwest of Fairmont. It lies at an elevation of 135 feet (41 m).
