= Riegelwood, North Carolina =

- Census-designated place
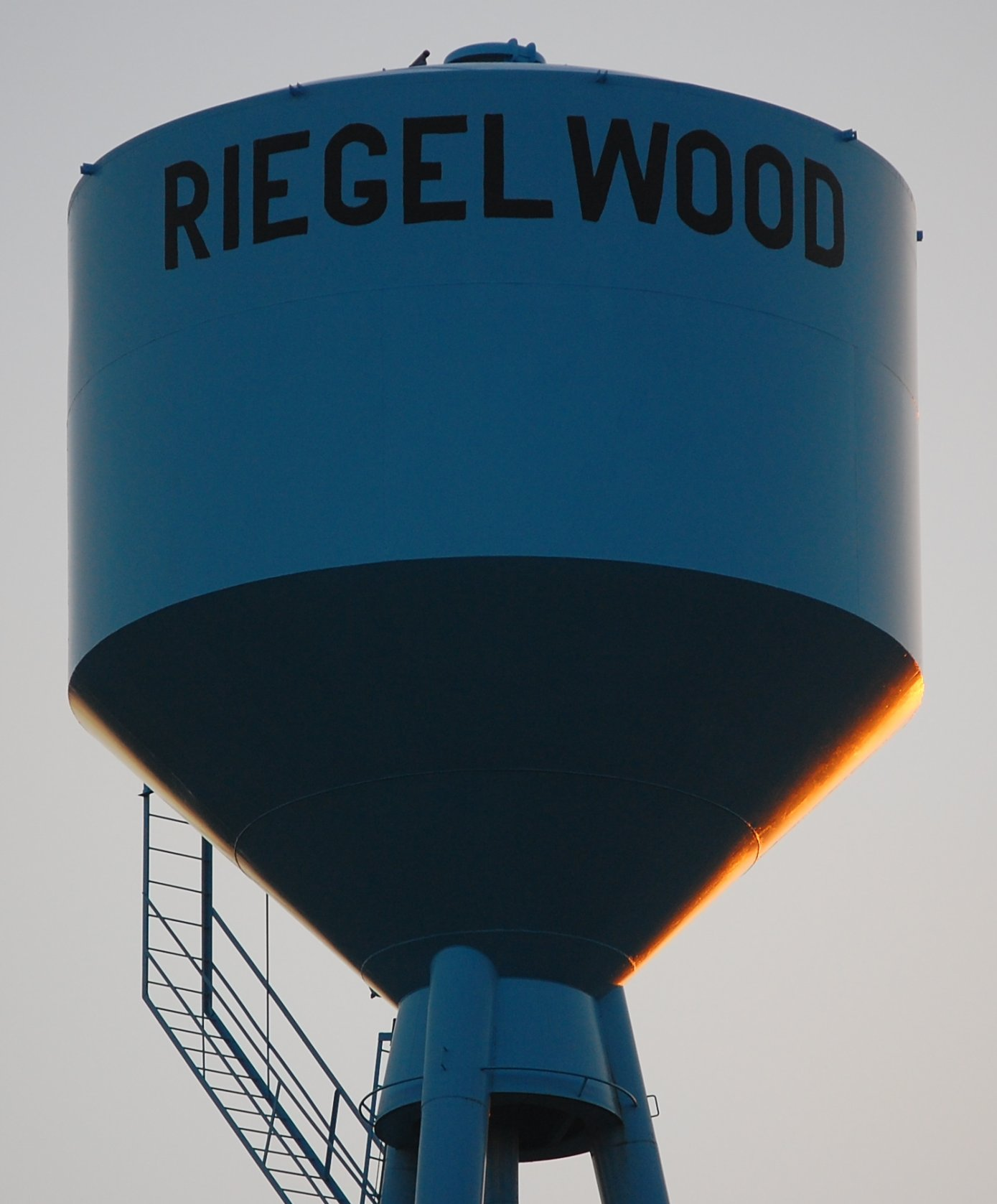
- Riegelwood Watertower

- Location within the state of North Carolina
- Coordinates: 34°20′40″N 78°13′11″W
- Country: United States
- State: North Carolina
- County: Columbus

Area
  - Total: 3.37 sq mi (8.74 km^{2})
  - Land: 3.08 sq mi (7.99 km^{2})
  - Water: 0.29 sq mi (0.75 km^{2})
- Elevation: 43 ft (13 m)

Population (2020)
  - Total: 545
  - Density: 176.7/sq mi (68.22/km^{2})
- Time zone: UTC-5 (Eastern (EST))
  - Summer (DST): UTC-4 (EDT)
- ZIP code: 28456
- Area codes: 910, 472
- FIPS code: 37-56600
- GNIS feature ID: 2628650

Riegelwood is an unincorporated community and census-designated place (CDP) in Columbus County, North Carolina, United States. The population was 545 at the 2020 census. It is the location of a saw mill and a paper mill.

== History ==
The Black Rock Plantation House was listed on the National Register of Historic Places in 2014.

== Geography ==
Riegelwood is located near the eastern tip of Columbus County, south of Mitchell Landing on the Cape Fear River, site of an International Paper plant. North Carolina Highway 87 passes through Riegelwood, leading southeast 2 miles (3 km) to U.S. Routes 74 and 76 in Delco and northwest 30 miles (48 km) to Elizabethtown. Wilmington is 19 miles (31 km) to the southeast via US 74/76.

According to the U.S. Census Bureau, the Riegelwood CDP has a total area of 3.4 square miles (8.8 km^{2}), of which 3.1 square miles (8.1 km^{2}) is land and 0.27 square miles (0.7 km^{2}), or 8.28%, is water.

== Demographics ==
Historical population
Census	Pop.	Note	%±
2020	545		—
U.S. Decennial Census

== 2006 severe weather event ==
On November 16, 2006, at 6:21 am EST, a severe thunderstorm warning was issued for eastern Columbus County. At 6:29 am, a tornado warning was issued for the same area. At 6:37, an F3 tornado struck a mobile home park and killed eight people, including two children, Danny Jacobs, 6, and Miguel Martinez, 13. Twenty people were injured. The tornado was a part of a 3-day tornado outbreak in the South, in which four other deaths were reported. Riegelwood was one of the hardest hit areas.

On Friday, November 17, 2006, a NOAA National Weather Service storm survey team assessed the tornado damage and rated it at F3 on the Fujita scale for nearly a mile in Riegelwood, with winds approaching 200 miles per hour (320 km/h). The maximum width of the tornado was 300 yards where the F3 damage occurred. The rest of the 7-mile (11 km) damage path was less than 100 yards wide and rated at F1, with winds less than 100 mph extending north across Columbus County into western Pender County.

The Columbus County sheriff reported thirty homes destroyed in the F3 damage area. Another three structures were damaged in Pender County, just west of Currie.
