= Green Swamp (North Carolina) =

Swamp in North Carolina, United States

Green Swamp Preserve
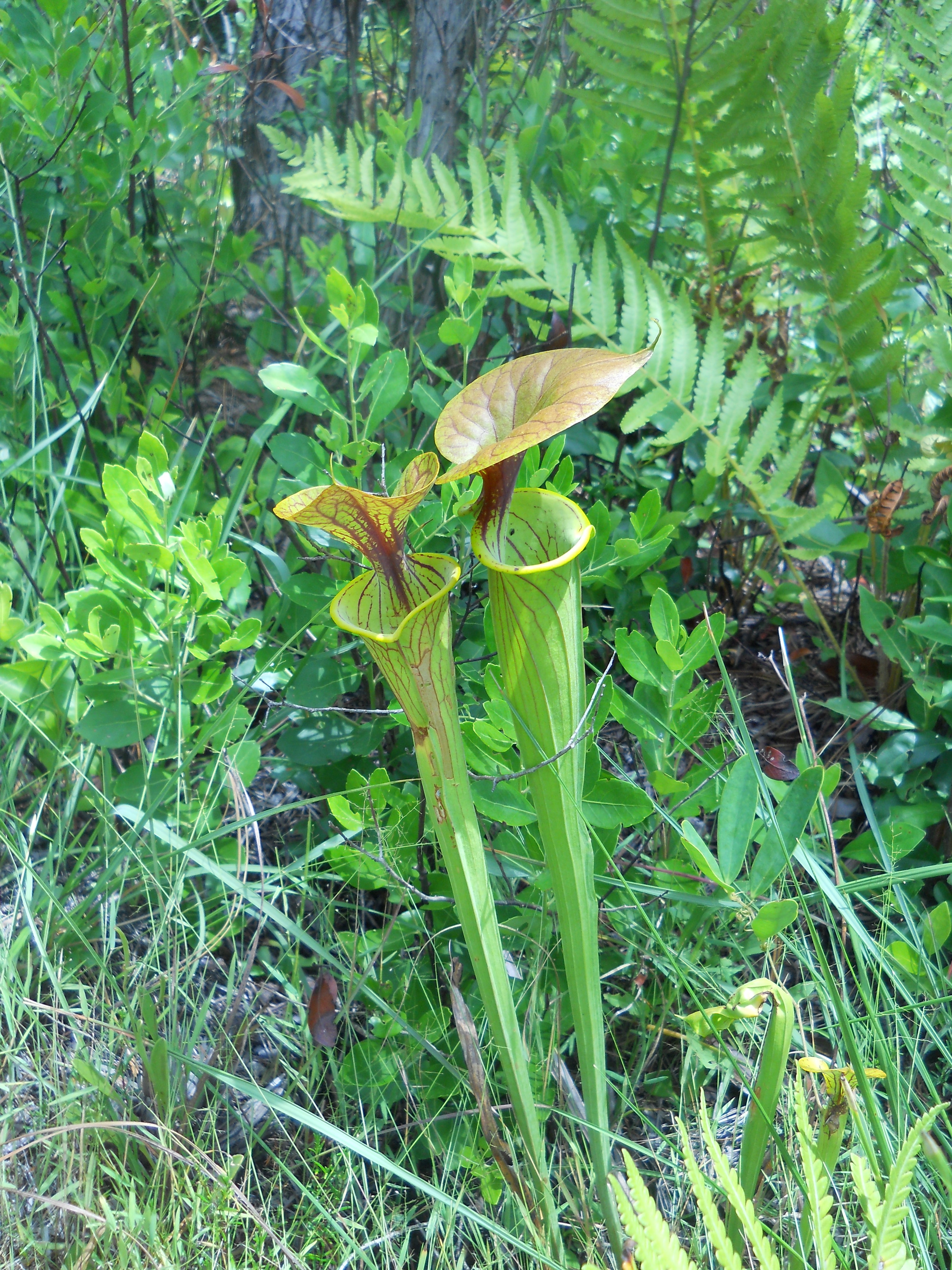
- Sarracenia flava pitcher plants in Green Swamp

- Location within North Carolina
- Location: Brunswick and Columbus counties, North Carolina
- Coordinates: 34.09321°N 78.29925°W
- Area: 17,424 acres (7,051 ha)
- Established: 1977
- Governing body: Nature Conservancy

U.S. National Natural Landmark
- Designated: 1974

The Green Swamp is a swamp that lies in Brunswick and Columbus counties of North Carolina. The 15,907-acre (6,437 ha) swamp was designated as a National Natural Landmark in 1974. Today, the Nature Conservancy manages over 17,424 acres (7051 ha) of the swamp, known as the Green Swamp Preserve. North Carolina laws prohibit removal of these plants from the Green Swamp because of their importance to the unique ecosystem and organisms. The Green Swamp ecosystem relies heavily on its wetlands, which support a rich ecology and habitats for migrating birds and species in the Atlantic Flyway.

== Carnivorous plants ==
The North Carolina Green Swamp is home to many types of carnivorous plants due to its unique habitat. The wet longleaf pine savannah provides damp, nutrient-poor soil and an open understory, creating suitable conditions for carnivorous plants. The Green Swamp's wet and mesic savannas are also characterized by their high plant diversity, like insectivorous plants.

Notable carnivorous plants include:

- Venus flytrap (Dionaea muscipula): A species endemic to a small area around Wilmington, North Carolina, with one of its largest wild populations is in the Green Swamp. Walker and Peet found that low light caused by heavy litter accumulation may contribute to the decrease of Venus flytraps in these communities.
- Pitcher plant: Several species can be found in the Green Swamp, including the yellow pitcher plant (Sarracenia flava), and the purple pitcher plant (Sarracenia purpurea).
- Pinguicula (butterworts): Yellow butterwort (Pinguicula lutea), and blue butterwort (Pinguicula caerulea) are found in the swamp. These have sticky leaves that trap insects.
- Bladderworts: Eastern purple bladderwort (Utricularia purpurea) and the slender bladderwort (Utricularia subulata) are found in the swamp. They have a sweet, sticky gland on their leaves that attracts and traps insects.
- Drosera (sundews): Species found in the Green Swamp include Dwarf Sundew (Drosera brevifolia), Pink Sundew (Drosera capillaris), and Thread-leaved Sundew (Drosera filiformis). Walker and Peet also documented Drosera intermedia in the wet savannas of the Green Swamp.

The Green Swamp is a poorly drained wetland system with high water tables and long periods of soil saturation throughout the year. These hydrologic conditions support the diverse plant community found throughout the swamp.

== Plant communities and biodiversity ==
The Green Swamp has several types of savanna communities that vary based on the moisture conditions. Walker and Peet found dry, mesic, and wet savannas in the Green Swamp with high and diverse levels of plant species throughout these communities. Their study recorded up to 42 species per 0.25 m² and 84 species per 625 m^{2}. The highest species richness was found in mesic savannas that were burned yearly.

The wet savannas are found in shallow depressions and along areas between mesic savannas and shrub pocosins. These areas help to grow grasses, sedges, shrubs, and other plant species that are adapted to these wet conditions. Drosera intermedia is a species of plant found recurring in wet savannas.

Fire is an important factor in these savanna communities. Walker and Peet reported that fire reduces woody vegetation from growing and removes accumulated grass and sedge to help maintain conditions for smaller plants. They also noted that without burning, there can be a decline in plant diversity.

== Hydrology and fire ==
The Green Swamp is part of a larger wetland system known for its poor drainage, low slopes, high water tables, and rich soils. In the Green Swamp pocosin, water can move as a sheet flow rather than through channels as most bodies of water do.

Water levels in the wetland are affected by vegetation, fires, hurricanes, and other changes to the landscape by nature. Riggs et al. discovered that fires in the Green Swamp can temporarily increase the water table by reducing vegetation and decreasing evapotranspiration. In 1955, a fire in the Green Swamp showed evidence of very high water levels and sheet flow across the pocosin.

Changes to drainage can also affect the wetland conditions. The Waccamaw drainage system has seen ditching and draining from agriculture and forestry, while at the same time parts of the Green Swamp have stayed wetlands despite these factors.

== Conservation ==
Many plant species found in the Green Swamp are conserved or would benefit from it. Zettler, Sunley, and Delaney studied the yellow fringeless orchid, also known as Platanthera integra, a species listed as threatened in North Carolina. Their study collected seeds from the Green Swamp and examined how they germinate with mycorrhizal fungi. The research found that the fungi promoted seed germination and helped preserve orchids and other plant species in the habitat for conservation. The Nature Conservancy manages the Green Swamp Preserve and has implemented many conservation acts. They've planned fires to maintain fire-dependent habitats and protect diverse plant and organism communities.

The study focused on the importance of the relationships between plants and organisms in the Green Swamp. The researchers stated that preserving orchids can help protect the mycorrhizal fungi needed to conserve these plants.
