= Columbus County, North Carolina =

County in North Carolina, United States

- County
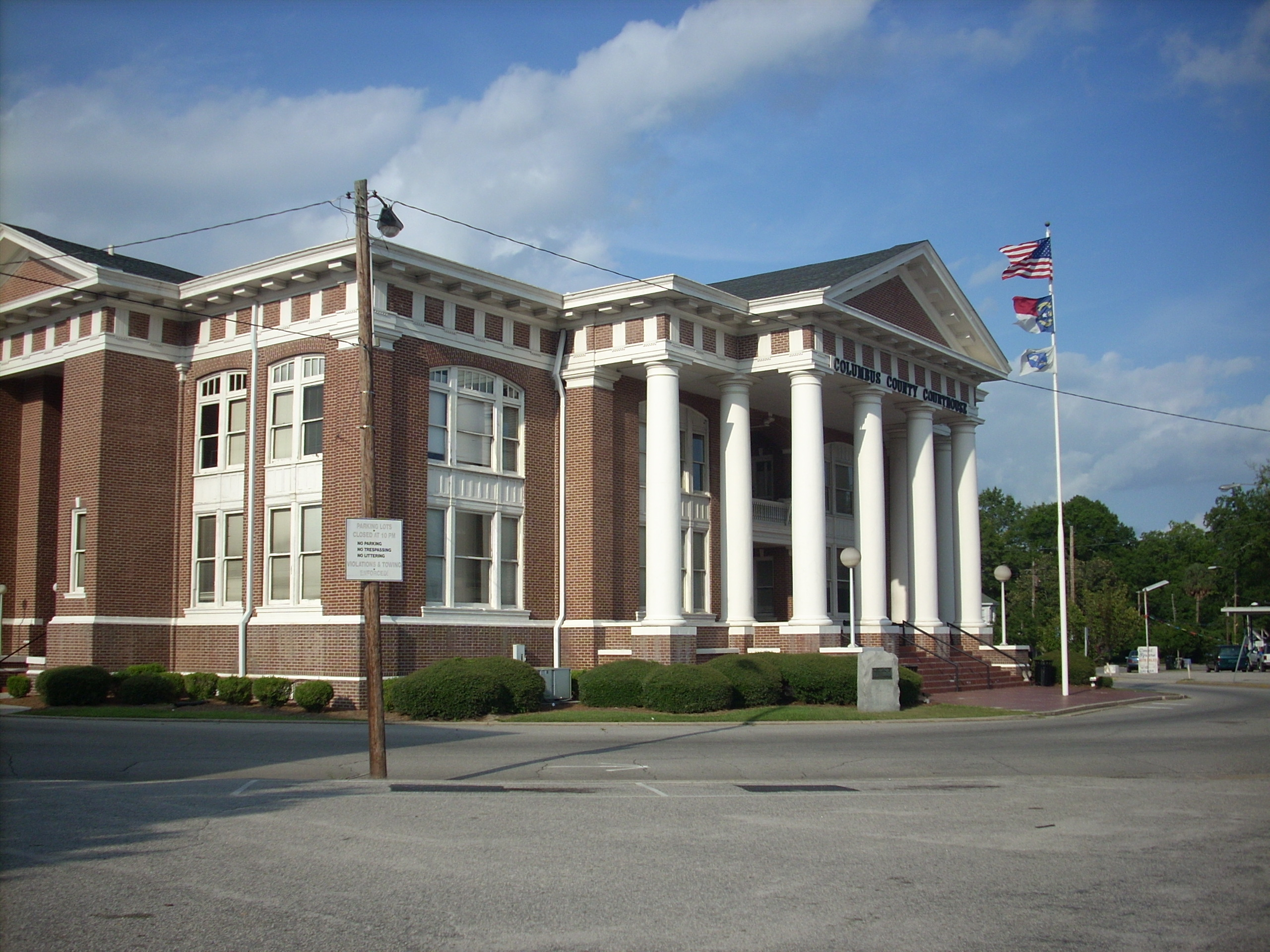
- Columbus County Courthouse in Whiteville

- Flag Seal
- Motto: "We are ready to grow with you."
- Location within the U.S. state of North Carolina
- Interactive map of Columbus County, North Carolina
- Coordinates: 34.26°N 78.64°W
- Country: United States
- State: North Carolina
- Founded: 1808
- Named for: Christopher Columbus
- Seat: Whiteville
- Largest community: Whiteville

Area
  - Total: 955.00 sq mi (2,473.4 km^{2})
  - Land: 938.12 sq mi (2,429.7 km^{2})
  - Water: 16.88 sq mi (43.7 km^{2}) 1.77%

Population (2020)
  - Total: 50,623
  - Estimate (2025): 50,487 ▼
  - Density: 53.96/sq mi (20.83/km^{2})
- Time zone: UTC−5 (Eastern)
  - Summer (DST): UTC−4 (EDT)
- Congressional district: 7th
- Website: www.columbusco.org

Columbus County is a county located in the U.S. state of North Carolina. Its county seat is Whiteville. At the 2020 census, the population was 50,623.

== History ==
=== Early history ===
The area comprising Columbus County was originally inhabited by the Waccamaw people. Historically, the "eastern Siouans" had territories extending through the area of Columbus County prior to any European exploration or settlement in the 16th century.

English colonial settlement in what was known as Carolina did not increase until the late 17th and early 18th centuries. Following epidemics of new infectious diseases, to which indigenous peoples were exposed in trading and other contact, the Waccamaw and other Native Americans often suffered disruption and fatalities when caught between larger tribes and colonists in the Tuscarora and Yamasee wars. Afterward, most of the Tuscarora people migrated north, joining other Iroquoian-speaking peoples of the Five Nations of the Iroquois Confederacy in New York State by 1722. At that point, the leaders declared their migration ended and the tribe officially relocated to that area.

The Waccamaw Siouan ancestors retreated for safety to an area of Green Swamp near Lake Waccamaw. Throughout the 19th century, the Waccamaw Siouan were seldom mentioned in the historical record. If descendants intermarried with whites and/or African Americans, their children were assumed to lose their Indian status, although they were often reared in Indian culture. Since North Carolina was a slave society, whites classified anyone with visible African features as slaves and blacks first.

=== Colonial settlement ===
As America was colonized by the British, the area encompassing Columbus County was first organized part of the Bath Precinct of North Carolina, established by the British Crown in 1696. In 1729, a southern portion was split off by the General Assembly to create New Hanover County, and five years later Bladen was formed out of part of New Hanover. In 1764, Brunswick County was formed out of Bladen and New Hanover. Throughout this time the area was largely forested and had few white settlers, though the General Assembly established two roads through the area in 1764. William Bartram, a botanist from Pennsylvania, journeyed to Lake Waccamaw to study the flora and fauna of the region in the 1730s, creating the first detailed written account of the area. At least two skirmishes of the American Revolutionary War were fought on Columbus soil: one near Pireway and another at Brown Marsh.

=== Creation ===
Columbus County was created by the General Assembly on December 15, 1808, to make it easier for local residents to conduct official business without having to travel to the seat of Brunswick County. Columbus was formed from parts of Bladen and Brunswick counties and named in honor of Christopher Columbus. The county's borders were modified several times by legislative act between 1809 and 1821. In 1810, a community was platted on land owned by James B. White for the purpose of creating a county seat. It was originally known as White's Crossing before being incorporated as Whiteville in 1832. The first courthouse and jail, made of wood, were built there in 1809.

=== Development ===
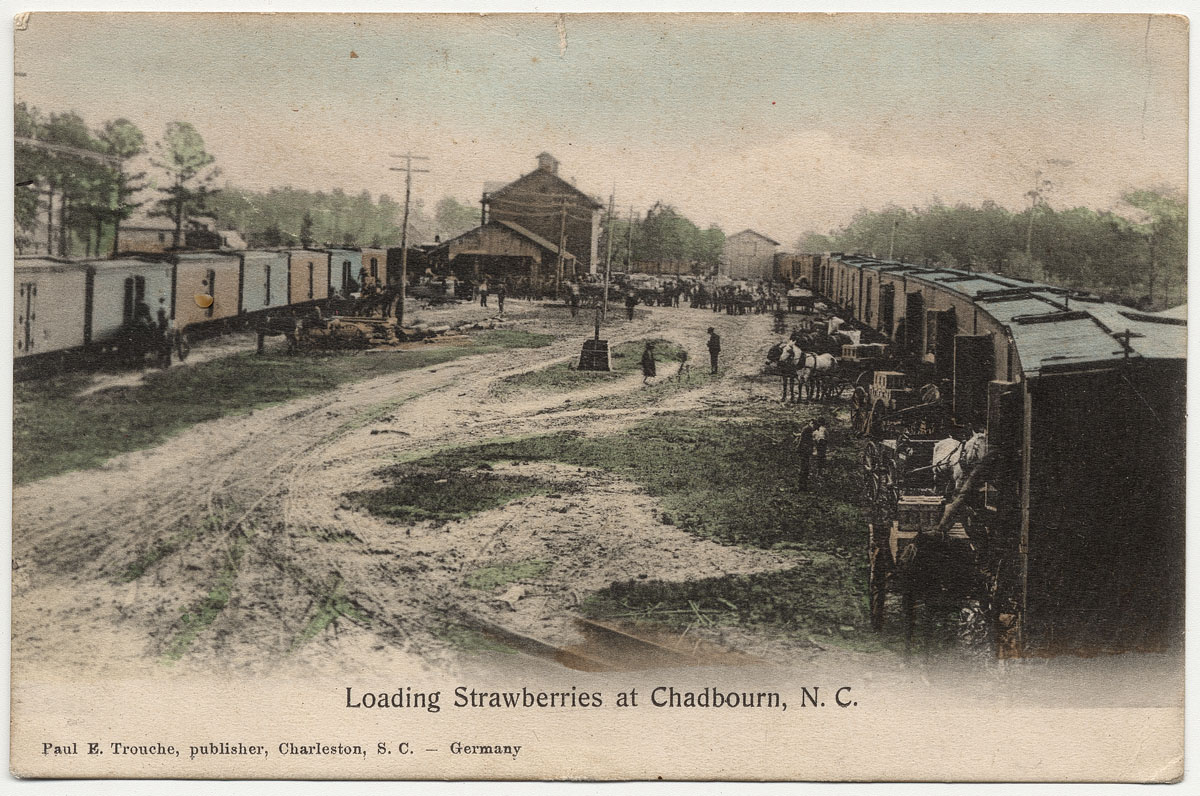
Farmers loading strawberries onto rail cars in Chadbourn c. 1907

At the time of its creation, Columbus County was sparsely populated. A new brick courthouse and jail were erected in 1852. The construction of a railroad along the Bladen-Columbus border in the 1860s spurred growth. The laying of the Wilmington, Columbia and Augusta Railroad later in the decade connected Whiteville with Wilmington and supported the development of strong lumber and naval stores industries. The county also produced corn, wheat, cotton, and wool.

Most white men in the county fought during the American Civil War, while most free blacks and biracial individuals were exempted from service. The county was spared direct fighting, but the war demands stressed the local labor and food markets, and severe rains in 1863 diminished grain yields. Most residents resorted to trade via the barter system. After Wilmington fell to Union troops in February 1865, Union marauders sacked Whiteville. After the war Columbus' economy grew more heavily reliant on corn and cotton production. In 1877, part of Brunswick County was annexed to Columbus.

In the post-Reconstruction period, after white Democrats regained dominance in politics, they emphasized white supremacy and classified all non-whites as black. For instance, Native Americans could not attend schools for white children. Toward the end of the century, the U.S. Census recorded common Waccamaw surnames among individuals in the small isolated communities of this area.

Tobacco was introduced as a crop in Columbus in 1896, and that year a tobacco warehouse was established in Fair Bluff. It remained a marginal crop until 1914, and at the conclusion of World War I overtook cotton as the county's major cash crop. The county's first bank was opened in 1903. Strawberries were introduced at Chadbourn in 1895, and by 1907 Chadbourn had become one of the leading strawberry producers in the world. Another courthouse and jail were built in 1914.

=== Ku Klux Klan ===
In 1950, Thomas Hamilton, a South Carolina leader of a white supremacist Ku Klux Klan chapter, began a recruiting campaign to expand his organization's reach into Columbus County, focusing on the towns of Chadbourn, Fair Bluff, Tabor City, and Whiteville. In late July, they paraded through Tabor City, passing out handbills which exhorted white men to join them in resisting "Jews, niggers, and integrationist quacks". W. Horace Carter, the publisher of the Tabor City Tribune, issued an editorial the following day denouncing the Klan as a violent group and urging local residents to ignore them, leading to a threatening note being placed on his car the following day. The county hosted many Klan sympathizers and a Klavern was organized later that year in Whiteville. The News Reporter of Whiteville, led by editor Willard Cole, joined the Tabor City Tribune in reporting on Klan activities and denouncing the organization, leading to threats against Cole.

The following January, the Klansmen began night raids on homes, abducting and flogging residents who they felt had violated traditional mores. Over the following months, the Klan continued to conduct raids, heightening local tensions. In early October 1951, Klansmen from Fair Bluff abducted a couple and transported them into South Carolina. Abduction crossing state lines was a federal crime, and as a result the U.S. Federal Bureau of Investigation (FBI) became involved. In February 1952, the FBI, state agents, and county sheriff's deputies initiated a crackdown and arrested 11 Klansmen responsible for the October abduction. Law enforcement made additional arrests over subsequent months. Of the near 100 Klansmen arrested, 63 including Hamilton were convicted of various crimes. For their efforts against the Klan, in 1953, the Tabor City Tribune and The News Reporter won the Pulitzer Prize for Public Service.

=== Colcor ===
By the early 1980s, Columbus County had a reputation for intense political competition marked by accusations of fraud and impropriety. The FBI had received several complaints from local police officers and residents about alleged protection rackets run by public officials and election fraud. In early 1980, a former FBI informant moved to the county and reported that he was being told to pay bribes to ensure the smooth operation of his business. Taking into account the previous complaints they had received, upon being informed, the FBI initiated an undercover investigation into corruption in Columbus County, codenamed "Colcor".

FBI agents posed as corrupt businessmen with connections to the Detroit Mafia. They set up an illegal gambling club in Lake Waccamaw to make connections with locals and paid bribes to a local judge and the town's police chief to protect their operation. The agents also paid bribes to county commission chairman Ed Walton Williamson in exchange for political influence. With Williamson's help, the agents devised a scheme to investigate election fraud by instigating a referendum in the town of Bolton to legalize liquor-by-the-drink and supplying a local political leader with funds to buy votes to achieve their desired outcome, the first time the FBI had ever tried to manipulate a public election. The town ultimately voted in favor of legalizing liquor-by-the-drink. The agents were also asked by State Representative G. Ronald Taylor to burn down a business competitor's property, though Taylor eventually enlisted other men to commit the arson.

The FBI publicly revealed the Colcor operation on July 29, 1982. A total of 40 people were indicted for crimes observed during the course of the investigation. Of those indicted, 38 were convicted of crimes, with many reaching plea bargains with prosecutors. The U.S. House of Representatives and the North Carolina State Board of Elections were critical of the FBI's involvement in the vote-buying sting surrounding the liquor referendum in Bolton, with the Board of Elections ultimately nullifying the referendum.

=== Economic stagnation ===
The manufacturing sector in Columbus County began a decline in the 1990s. Between 1999 and 2014, the county lost about 2,000 manufacturing jobs. The number of local farmers also declined. The county was heavily impacted by Hurricane Florence in 2018.

== Geography ==
Columbus County is located in southeastern North Carolina. It is bordered by Bladen County, Pender County, Brunswick County, and Robeson County in North Carolina and Horry County and Dillon County in South Carolina. According to the U.S. Census Bureau, the county has a total land area of 955.00 square miles (2,473.4 km^{2}), of which 938.12 square miles (2,429.7 km^{2}) is land and 16.88 square miles (43.7 km^{2}) (1.77%) is water. It is the third-largest county in North Carolina by land area. Columbus is drained by the Lumber River and Waccamaw River. There are several large lakes within the county, including Lake Tabor and Lake Waccamaw.

One of the most significant geographic features is the Green Swamp, a 15,907-acre area in the north-eastern portion of the county. Highway 211 passes alongside it. The swamp contains several unique and endangered species, such as the venus flytrap. The area contains the Brown Marsh Swamp, and has a remnant of the giant longleaf pine forest that once stretched across the Southeast from Virginia to Texas.

=== State and local protected areas ===
- Columbus County Game Land (part)
- Green Swamp Preserve (part)
- Honey Hill Hunting Preserve
- Juniper Creek Game Land (part)
- Lake Waccamaw State Park
- Lumber River State Park (part)
- North Carolina Museum of Natural Sciences at Whiteville

=== Major water bodies ===
- Cape Fear River
- Juniper Creek
- Lake Waccamaw
- Lumber River
- Waccamaw River
- White Marsh

== Climate ==
Columbus County is located in the humid subtropical climate (Köppen climate classification Cfa) zone, with mostly moderate temperatures year round. Winters are mild across Columbus, with the warmest winter temperatures found in the eastern and southeastern portions of the county due to the influence of the nearby Atlantic Ocean. The average high temperature in January is around 55 °F (13 °C). Summers are hot and humid, with the hottest summer temperatures found in the northern and western areas of Columbus County. The average high temperature in July is around 90 °F (32 °C).

The USDA hardiness zone for Columbus County is Zone 8B.

== Demographics ==
Historical population
Census	Pop.	Note	%±
1810	3,022		—
1820	3,912		29.5%
1830	4,141		5.9%
1840	3,941		−4.8%
1850	5,909		49.9%
1860	8,597		45.5%
1870	8,474		−1.4%
1880	14,439		70.4%
1890	17,856		23.7%
1900	21,274		19.1%
1910	28,020		31.7%
1920	30,124		7.5%
1930	37,720		25.2%
1940	45,663		21.1%
1950	50,621		10.9%
1960	48,973		−3.3%
1970	46,937		−4.2%
1980	51,037		8.7%
1990	49,587		−2.8%
2000	54,749		10.4%
2010	58,098		6.1%
2020	50,623		−12.9%
2025 (est.)	50,487	▼	−0.3%
U.S. Decennial Census; 1790–1960 1900–1990; 1990–2000 2010 2020

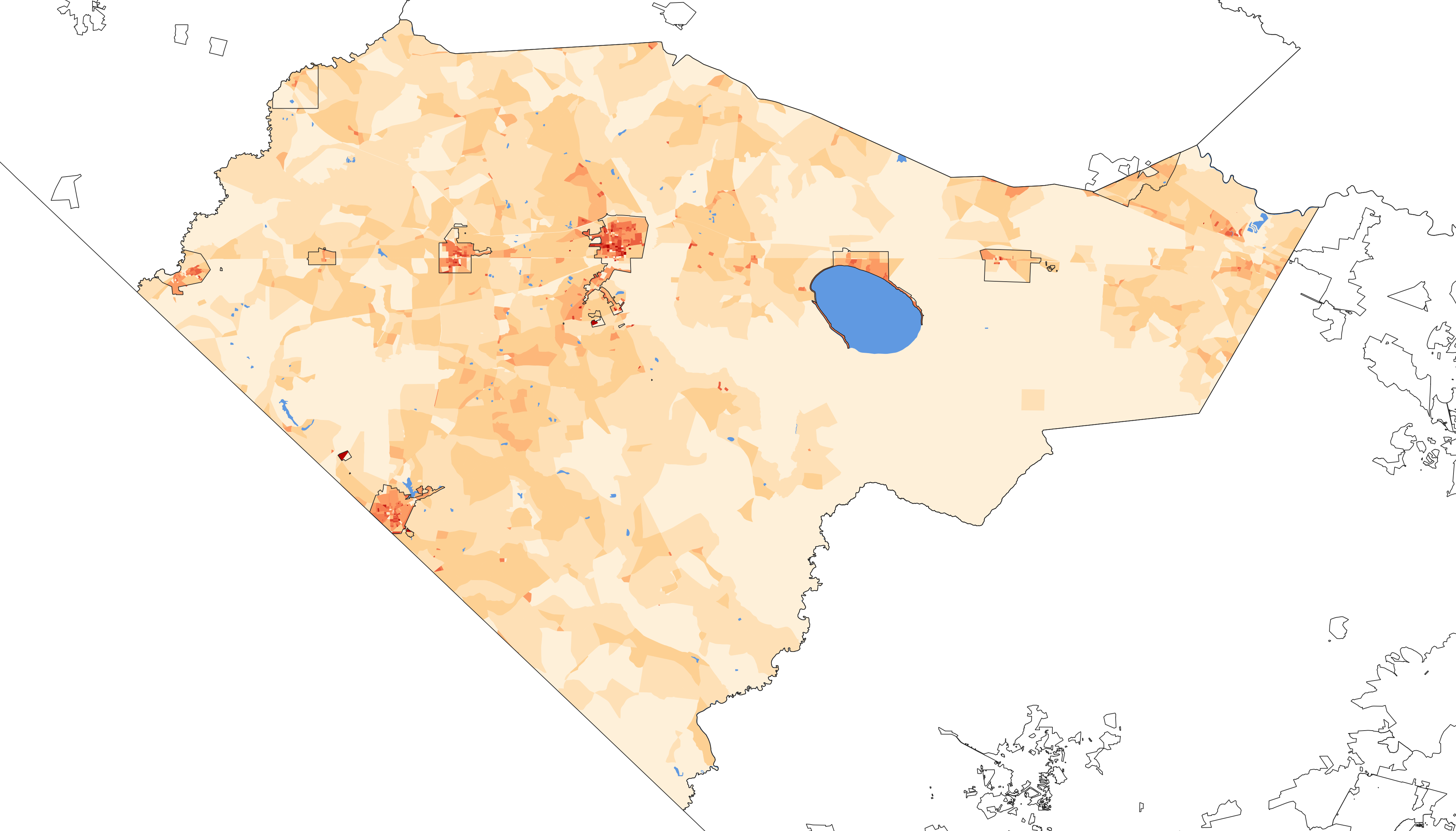
2020 population density of Columbus County NC by census block

=== 2020 census ===
As of the 2020 census, there were 50,623 people residing in the county, representing a 12.9% decline from 2010. The median age was 43.7 years, 20.4% of residents were under the age of 18, and 21.0% of residents were 65 years of age or older; for every 100 females there were 99.7 males, and for every 100 females age 18 and over there were 98.8 males age 18 and over.

The racial makeup of the county was 60.0% White, 28.8% Black or African American, 3.4% American Indian and Alaska Native, 0.3% Asian, <0.1% Native Hawaiian and Pacific Islander, 3.5% from some other race, and 3.9% from two or more races. Hispanic or Latino residents of any race comprised 5.2% of the population. Compared to state averages, the county reported higher proportions of Black and American Indian residents and lower proportions of White, Asian, and Hispanic residents.

Whiteville is the largest municipality.

10.3% of residents lived in urban areas, while 89.7% lived in rural areas.

There were 20,368 households in the county, of which 27.9% had children under the age of 18 living in them. Of all households, 41.6% were married-couple households, 20.0% were households with a male householder and no spouse or partner present, and 33.6% were households with a female householder and no spouse or partner present. About 31.7% of all households were made up of individuals and 16.1% had someone living alone who was 65 years of age or older.

There were 23,433 housing units, of which 13.1% were vacant. Among occupied housing units, 71.3% were owner-occupied and 28.7% were renter-occupied. The homeowner vacancy rate was 1.1% and the rental vacancy rate was 6.8%.

=== Racial and ethnic composition ===
Columbus County, North Carolina – Racial and ethnic composition Note: the US Census treats Hispanic/Latino as an ethnic category. This table excludes Latinos from the racial categories and assigns them to a separate category. Hispanics/Latinos may be of any race.
Race / Ethnicity (NH = Non-Hispanic)	Pop 1980	Pop 1990	Pop 2000	Pop 2010	Pop 2020	% 1980	% 1990	% 2000	% 2010	% 2020
White alone (NH)	34,170	32,816	34,380	35,068	30,019	66.95%	66.18%	62.80%	60.36%	59.30%
Black or African American alone (NH)	15,191	15,122	16,901	17,587	14,503	29.76%	30.50%	30.87%	30.27%	28.65%
Native American or Alaska Native alone (NH)	1,175	1,350	1,665	1,788	1,670	2.30%	2.72%	3.04%	3.08%	3.30%
Asian alone (NH)	26	51	118	143	156	0.05%	0.10%	0.22%	0.25%	0.31%
Native Hawaiian or Pacific Islander alone (NH)	x	x	13	26	10	x	x	0.02%	0.04%	0.02%
Other race alone (NH)	0	6	33	78	143	0.00%	0.01%	0.06%	0.13%	0.28%
Mixed race or Multiracial (NH)	x	x	370	746	1,509	x	x	0.68%	1.28%	2.98%
Hispanic or Latino (any race)	475	242	1,269	2,662	2,613	0.93%	0.49%	2.32%	4.58%	5.16%
Total	51,037	49,587	54,749	58,098	50,623	100.00%	100.00%	100.00%	100.00%	100.00%

=== Inclusion of inmate population ===
Unlike the 2010 census, the population of incarcerated persons were included in the 2020 census. In 2020, Columbus County had an inmate prison population of approximately 2,500.

=== Demographic change ===
Between 2010 and 2020, Columbus County lost 7,475 residents, a population decline of 12.9 percent. The U.S. Census Bureau recorded declines in 12 of 14 reported communities. Census experts anticipate a further population decline between 2020 and 2030.

== Government and politics ==
=== Government ===
Columbus County is governed by a seven-member Board of Commissioners. The county is represented in the North Carolina Senate in district 8 and in the North Carolina House of Representatives in district 46. The county is a member of the regional Cape Fear Council of Governments, where it participates in area planning on a variety of issues.

=== Judicial system and law enforcement ===
Columbus County lies within the bounds of North Carolina's 15th Prosecutorial District, the 13A Superior Court District, and the 13th District Court District. The Columbus County Sheriff's Office provides law enforcement services for the county as well as operating the Columbus County Detention Center.

There are two state prisons within Columbus County:

- Columbus Correctional Institution in Brunswick
- Tabor City Correctional Institution in Tabor City

=== 2022 Columbus County Sheriff controversy ===
In November 2022, Sheriff Jody Greene was re-elected to office after resigning several weeks prior due to allegations of obstructing justice and racism. Immediately after his re-election, District Attorney Jon David filed a new petition for Greene's removal from office, including a request to permanently disqualify him from elected office in Columbus County. Greene would later resign from office for the second time in January 2023. As of January 2024, a federal investigation into the actions of Sheriff Jody Greene and the Columbus County Sheriff's Office was pending.

=== Politics ===
United States presidential election results for Columbus County, North Carolina
Year	Republican		Democratic		Third party(ies)	
Year	No.	%	No.	%	No.	%
1912	155	5.71%	1,668	61.44%	892	32.85%
1916	1,327	38.22%	2,143	61.72%	2	0.06%
1920	1,783	36.43%	3,111	63.57%	0	0.00%
1924	1,629	36.92%	2,757	62.49%	26	0.59%
1928	3,533	55.32%	2,854	44.68%	0	0.00%
1932	739	12.55%	5,098	86.55%	53	0.90%
1936	1,214	16.03%	6,359	83.97%	0	0.00%
1940	934	13.67%	5,900	86.33%	0	0.00%
1944	1,552	21.35%	5,717	78.65%	0	0.00%
1948	1,105	15.00%	5,511	74.79%	753	10.22%
1952	3,001	30.19%	6,941	69.81%	0	0.00%
1956	2,300	22.76%	7,805	77.24%	0	0.00%
1960	3,655	25.90%	10,455	74.10%	0	0.00%
1964	4,471	33.18%	9,004	66.82%	0	0.00%
1968	3,881	26.19%	4,243	28.64%	6,693	45.17%
1972	8,468	70.64%	3,305	27.57%	214	1.79%
1976	3,184	22.11%	11,148	77.41%	69	0.48%
1980	5,522	34.64%	10,212	64.07%	206	1.29%
1984	9,150	51.11%	8,728	48.75%	26	0.15%
1988	6,659	41.93%	9,172	57.75%	51	0.32%
1992	5,462	28.88%	11,469	60.63%	1,985	10.49%
1996	6,017	36.96%	9,019	55.40%	1,244	7.64%
2000	8,342	45.28%	9,986	54.20%	97	0.53%
2004	10,773	50.84%	10,343	48.81%	75	0.35%
2008	12,994	53.51%	11,076	45.61%	212	0.87%
2012	12,941	53.38%	11,050	45.58%	252	1.04%
2016	14,272	60.14%	9,063	38.19%	397	1.67%
2020	16,832	63.65%	9,446	35.72%	168	0.64%
2024	17,592	66.63%	8,648	32.76%	162	0.61%

After the Reconstruction era, Columbus County's politics fell under the domination of the Democratic Party. Through much of the 20th century, local primaries were the preeminent political contests, marked by intense intraparty competition. General elections often displayed low turnout. Throughout much of the 2000s, the county electorate regularly supported Republican presidential candidates and Democratic local and state candidates. Following the election of Democrat Barack Obama as U.S. president in 2008, Republicans' performance in local races markedly improved. As of 2022, the county hosts about 36,200 registered voters, comprising about 15,344 registered Democrats, 10,100 registered Republicans and 10,700 unaffiliated. Despite Democrats' registration advantage, only one unopposed Democrat was elected to a county office in the 2022 local general elections. In 2024, Republican presidential candidate Donald Trump won the county with 67 percent of its vote.

== Economy ==
The economy of Columbus County centers on agriculture and manufacturing. Columbus farmers produce crops such as pecans and peanuts, along with soybeans, potatoes, and corn. Cattle, poultry, and catfish are other agricultural products in the county. Factories in the region produce textiles, tools, and plywood. Household products such as doors, furniture, and windows are also manufactured in Columbus. The county hosts two industrial parks and shares a third with Brunswick County. International Paper is the largest employer. According to census figures, over 14,000 Columbus residents commute to other counties for work, while about 7,600 residents work within the county. The North Carolina Department of Commerce classifies the county as economically distressed and it has regularly suffered from a higher unemployment rate than the state average.

== Transportation ==
Airplane facilities are provided by the Columbus County Municipal Airport in Whiteville. The R.J. Corman Railroad Group operates a shortline railroad in the county.

=== Major highways ===
- Future I-74
- US 74
- US 74 Bus.
- US 76
- US 701
- US 701 Bus. (Clarkton)
- US 701 Bus. (Tabor City)
- US 701 Bus. (Whiteville)
- NC 11
- NC 87
- NC 130
- NC 131
- NC 211
- NC 214
- NC 242
- NC 410
- NC 904
- NC 905

== Education ==
Columbus is one of the few counties in North Carolina that has two public school systems: one for the county, which mostly serves rural areas, and one for the city of Whiteville. Both are led by elected school boards. The county government maintains a system of six libraries. The county also hosts Southeastern Community College. According to the 2021 American Community Survey, an estimated 14.1 percent of county residents have attained a bachelor's degree or higher level of education.

== Healthcare ==
Columbus County is served by a single hospital, Columbus Regional Healthcare System, based in Whiteville. According to the 2022 County Health Rankings produced by the University of Wisconsin Population Health Institute, Columbus County ranked 91st in health outcomes of North Carolina's 100 counties, an improvement over recent years, as it was ranked last from 2010 to 2015. Per the ranking, 26 percent of adults say they are in poor or fair health, the average life expectancy is 74 years, and 17 percent of people under the age of 65 lack health insurance. Columbus County has been heavily impacted by the opioid epidemic and led the state in opioid pills per person from 2006 to 2012 averaging 113.5 pills per person per year.

== Communities ==
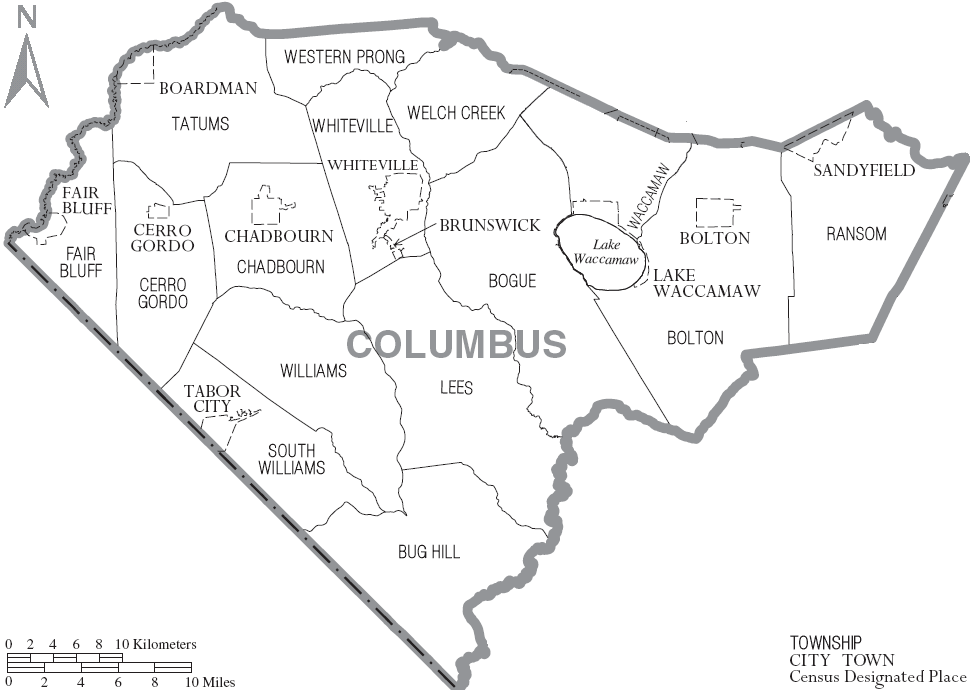
Map of Columbus County with municipal and township labels

=== Cities ===
- Whiteville (named county seat in 1832 and the largest community)

=== Towns ===
- Boardman
- Bolton
- Brunswick
- Cerro Gordo
- Chadbourn
- Fair Bluff
- Lake Waccamaw
- Sandyfield
- Tabor City (Incorporated as a town 1905)

=== Townships ===
- Bogue
- Bolton
- Bug Hill
- Cerro Gordo
- Chadbourn
- Fair Bluff
- Lees
- Ransom
- South Williams
- Tatums
- Waccamaw
- Welch Creek
- Western Prong
- Williams
- Whiteville

=== Census-designated places ===
- Delco
- Evergreen
- Hallsboro
- Riegelwood

=== Unincorporated communities ===
- Acme
- Cherry Grove
- Evergreen
- Nakina
- Olyphic
- Pireway
- Riverview
- Sellerstown
- Williamson's Crossroads

== See also ==
- List of counties in North Carolina
- National Register of Historic Places listings in Columbus County, North Carolina
- Waccamaw Siouan Indians, state-recognized tribe that resides in the county

== Works cited ==
- Corbitt, David Leroy (2000). The formation of the North Carolina counties, 1663-1943 (reprint ed.). Raleigh: North Carolina Division of Archives and History. OCLC 46398241.
- Cunningham, David (2013). Klansville, U.S.A: The Rise and Fall of the Civil Rights-era Ku Klux Klan (illustrated, reprint ed.). Oxford University Press USA. ISBN 978-0-19-975202-7.
- Harris, Roy J. Jr. (2015). Pulitzer's Gold: A Century of Public Service Journalism (second ed.). Columbia University Press. ISBN 978-0-231-54056-8.
- Justesen, Benjamin R. (2012). George Henry White: An Even Chance in the Race of Life (reprint ed.). Louisiana State University Press. ISBN 978-0-8071-4477-0.
- Lawless, Joseph S. (2012). Prosecutorial Misconduct: Law, Procedure, Forms (fourth ed.). Matthew Bender & Company. ISBN 978-1-4224-2213-7.
- Powell, William S. (1976). The North Carolina Gazetteer: A Dictionary of Tar Heel Places. Chapel Hill: The University of North Carolina Press. ISBN 978-0-8078-1247-1.
- Rogers, James A., ed. (1946). Columbus County, North Carolina 1946. Whiteville: The News Reporter. OCLC 9068697.
- Spruill, Willie E. (1990). Soil Survey of Columbus County, North Carolina. United States Department of Agriculture Soil Conservation Service.
