= Killing of Roger Fortson =

2024 killing of a United States Air Force serviceman

Roger Fortson
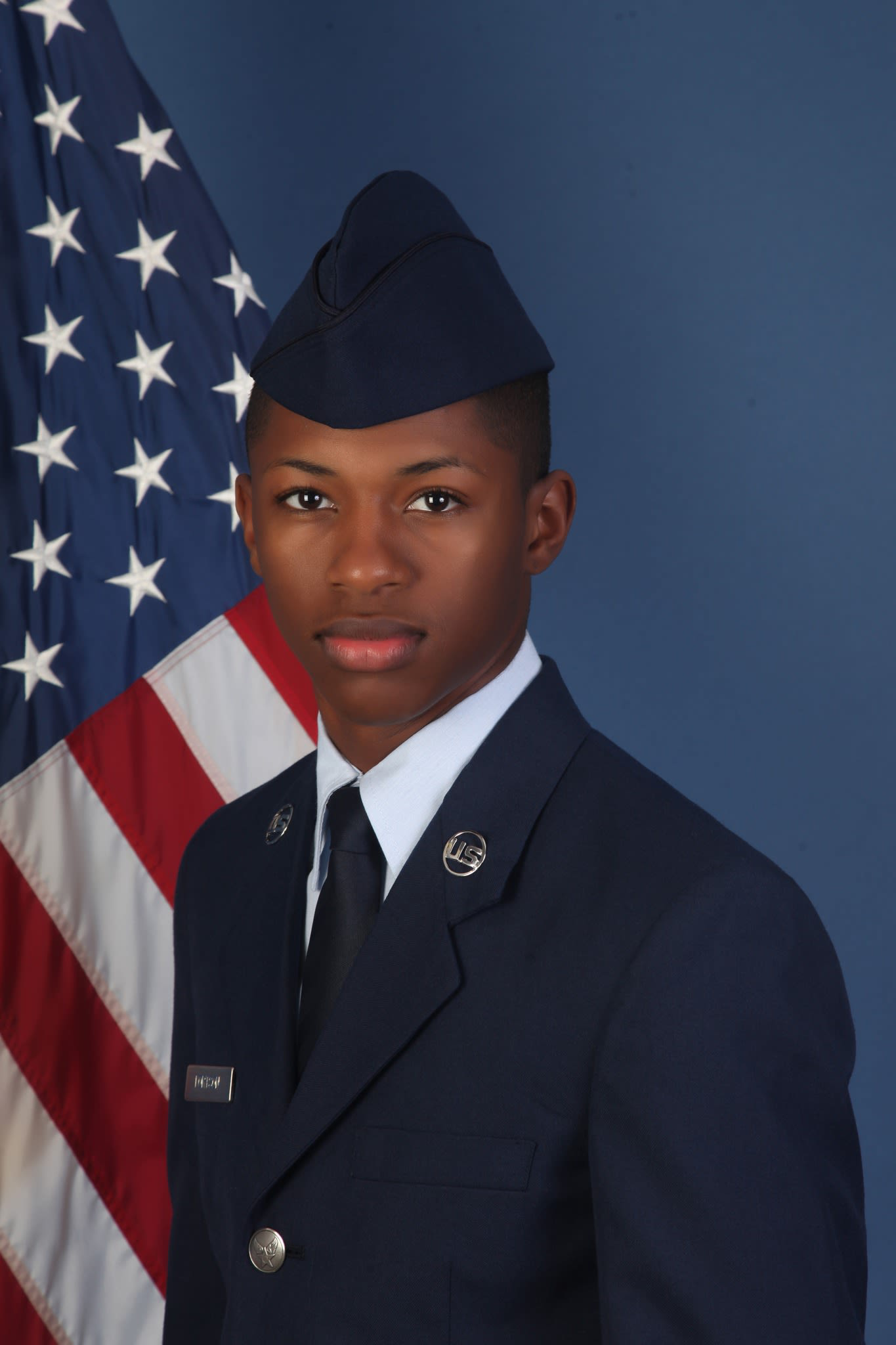
- United States Air Force portrait of Fortson in 2019
- Born: Roger Negale Fortson; April 15, 2001; Atlanta, Georgia, U.S.
- Died: May 3, 2024 (aged 23); Fort Walton Beach, Florida, U.S.
- Cause of death: Gunshot wound
- Resting place: Lincoln Memorial Cemetery; Atlanta, Georgia, U.S.
- Education: McNair High School
- Occupation: United States Air Force serviceman
- Years active: 2019–2024
- Known for: Victim of a police shooting
- Parents: Roger Wilburn (father); Chantemekki Fortson (mother)

On May 3, 2024, United States Air Force serviceman Roger Fortson was fatally shot in his home in Fort Walton Beach, Florida, by Deputy Eddie Duran of the Okaloosa County Sheriff's Office. The shooting prompted an internal investigation, which ultimately found that the deputy's use of deadly force violated agency policy. The deputy was fired and charged with manslaughter before being acquitted by a jury at trial.

== Shooting ==
Police radio audio showed a disturbance report made on May 3, 2024, around 4:30 p.m., for a residential complex, where a deputy said: "Don't have anything further than a male and female; it's all fourth-party information from the front desk at the leasing office".

Body camera footage shows an Okaloosa County Sheriff's deputy being told by a woman in a residential complex to go to Apartment 1401. The woman tells the deputy that "two weeks ago" when walking beside that apartment, she heard some "yelling" and profanities, as well as the sound of a slap, but she was not sure where that sound came from.

According to body camera footage, the sheriff's deputy arrived at Apartment 1401, and for about the first 15 seconds he listens quietly at the door. Deputy Duran then knocks, waits a few seconds, and upon apparently hearing activity inside the apartment he moves off to the side of the door, as is standard practice for law enforcement personnel. About 30 seconds later, Deputy Duran knocks for a second time and immediately announces "Sheriff’s office, open the door." Around 10 seconds later, the deputy knocks on the door for a third time, and again announces: "Sheriff's office, open the door." According to Fortson's mother and his girlfriend, who had been on FaceTime with him, Fortson heard a knock on his door and received no response when he asked who was at the door. His girlfriend also indicated that Fortson attempted to look through his peephole but was unable to see anyone, and had armed himself believing that someone was breaking in.

According to body camera footage, Fortson opens the door holding a gun in his right hand, with the gun held by his side and pointed downwards. As the door opens, the deputy tells Fortson to "step back" and immediately shoots Fortson. Five or six gunshots are fired. Around the time Fortson is shot, he lifts his left hand in front of his chest. Fortson falls to the floor, and it is only then that the deputy tells Fortson: "Drop the gun!"

After the shooting, Fortson was brought to a hospital, where he died.

== Response ==
On May 4, 2024, the Okaloosa County's Sheriff's Office said that the shooting occurred at an apartment after a sheriff's deputy responded to a call of a "disturbance in progress": "Hearing sounds of a disturbance, [the sheriff's deputy] reacted in self-defense after he encountered a 23-year-old man armed with a gun and after the deputy had identified himself as law enforcement." The Sheriff's Office further said that the unnamed deputy had been put on "paid administrative leave". Body camera footage of the shooting was later released by the Sheriff's Office on May 9, 2024.

One of the family's attorneys stated that Fortson died due to officers knocking on the wrong door, and that while mistakes happen, good people own their mistakes. Attorney Benjamin Crump, who represented the family, criticized the sheriff's initial account, given prior to the video being released.

The Okaloosa County Sheriff's Office announced on May 31, 2024, that it had fired Duran, the deputy who killed Fortson, after the agency's "administrative" internal investigation concluded that "Fortson did not make any hostile, attacking movements, and therefore, [deputy Duran's] use of deadly force was not objectively reasonable" and thus "violated agency policy". This announcement was the first time Duran was publicly identified as the shooter. The internal investigation concluded that "Fortson did not point the gun in [deputy Duran's] direction"; instead, Fortson's gun "was pointed at the ground sufficiently enough for [deputy Duran] to clearly see the rear face of the rear sight". In an interview with investigators, Duran claimed: "I'm standing there thinking I'm about to get shot, I'm about to die ... It is him or me at this point and I need to, I need to act as opposed to react".

On August 23, 2024, Duran was arrested and charged with one count of manslaughter with a firearm. Six days later, Duran was released from jail after posting a bond of $100,000.

The trial date was set for September 28, 2026 under Judge William Stone. Duran was acquitted by the jury.
