= Evergreen, Ransom Township, Columbus County, North Carolina =

Unincorporated community in North Carolina, US

Coordinates: 34°17′46″N 78°13′04″W

Evergreen is an unincorporated community in Columbus County, North Carolina
