= North Carolina Highway 904 =

State highway in North Carolina, US

North Carolina Highway 904

Route information
- Maintained by NCDOT
- Length: 67.5 mi (108.6 km)
- Existed: 1937–present

Major junctions
- West end: NC 130 in Five Forks
- US 76 in Fair Bluff; US 701 in Tabor City; US 17 in Grisettown
- East end: First Street in Ocean Isle Beach

Location
- Country: United States
- State: North Carolina
- Counties: Robeson, Columbus, Brunswick

Highway system
- North Carolina Highway System; Interstate; US; State; Scenic
← NC 903	→ NC 905

North Carolina Highway 904 (NC 904) is a primary state highway in the U.S. state of North Carolina. The highway parallels the North Carolina-South Carolina border as it connects Fair Bluff, Tabor City, Sunset Beach, and Ocean Isle Beach.

== Description ==
NC 904 is a 67.5-mile (108.6 km) east–west highway (physically running northwest–southeast) that travels from NC 130 in Five Forks, to East First Street in Ocean Isle Beach. It passes through Brunswick, Columbus, and Robeson Counties.

== History ==
Established in 1937 as a renumbering of NC 761 when it was extended into South Carolina, south of Tabor City, continuing as SC 904. Around 1951, US 701 was rerouted at Tabor City, replacing NC 904 into South Carolina; its former alignment became an extension of NC 410. In 1954, NC 904 was extended west on new primary routing to its current western terminus with NC 130 in Five Forks. By 1958, NC 904 was extended onto new primary routing east to Seaside; by 1963, it was extended again to its current eastern terminus in Ocean Isle Beach.

=== North Carolina Highway 761 ===
North Carolina Highway 761
- Location: Fair Bluff–Tabor City, NC
- Length: 15.6 mi (25.1 km)
- Existed: 1935–1937

North Carolina Highway 761 (NC 761) was established 1935 as new primary routing from US 76 in Fair Bluff, to US 701 in Tabor City. In 1937, it was renumbered as NC 904 when the highway was extended into South Carolina to sync with SC 904.

== Major intersections ==
County	Location	mi	km	Destinations	Notes
Robeson	Five Forks	0.0	0.0	NC 130 – Rowland, Fairmont	Western terminus
Robeson	Marietta	6.9	11.1	NC 41 – Fairmont, Lake View	
Columbus	Fair Bluff	15.0	24.1	US 76 west (Main Street) – Nichols	Western end of US 76 concurrency
Columbus	Fair Bluff	15.3	24.6	US 76 east (Main Street) – Chadbourn	Eastern end of US 76 concurrency
Columbus	Tabor City	30.9	49.7	US 701 Bus. / NC 410 south	Western end of US 701 Bus./NC 410 concurrency
Columbus	Tabor City	31.2	50.2	US 701 Bus. / NC 410 north	Eastern end of US 701 Bus./NC 410 concurrency
Columbus	Tabor City	31.9	51.3	US 701 – Whiteville, Loris	
Columbus	Pireway	48.0	77.2	NC 905 north – Whiteville	Western end of NC 905 concurrency
Columbus	Pireway	48.5	78.1	NC 905 south	Western end of NC 905 concurrency
Brunswick	Grisettown	60.0	96.6	US 17 – Shallotte, Carolina Shores	
Brunswick	Calabash	62.2	100.1	NC 179 south – Carolina Shores	Western end of NC 179 concurrency
Brunswick	Seaside	63.6	102.4	NC 179 Bus. south – Sunset Beach	Northern terminus of NC 179 Bus.
Brunswick	Ocean Isle Beach	66.3	106.7	NC 179 north – Shallotte	Eastern end of NC 179 concurrency
Brunswick	Ocean Isle Beach	66.5	107.0	Odell Williamson Bridge over the Intracoastal Waterway	
Brunswick	Ocean Isle Beach	67.7	109.0	First Street	Eastern terminus; roundabout
1.000 mi = 1.609 km; 1.000 km = 0.621 mi: Concurrency terminus
