= Brunswick, North Carolina =

- Town
- Location within the state of North Carolina
- Coordinates: 34°17′17″N 78°42′04″W
- Country: United States
- State: North Carolina
- County: Columbus

Area
  - Total: 0.60 sq mi (1.55 km^{2})
  - Land: 0.60 sq mi (1.55 km^{2})
  - Water: 0 sq mi (0.00 km^{2})
- Elevation: 82 ft (25 m)

Population (2020)
  - Total: 973
  - Density: 1,623.2/sq mi (626.74/km^{2})
- Time zone: UTC-5 (Eastern (EST))
  - Summer (DST): UTC-4 (EDT)
- ZIP code: 28424
- Area codes: 910, 472
- FIPS code: 37-08420
- GNIS feature ID: 2405337

Brunswick is a town in Columbus County, North Carolina, United States. The population was 973 at the 2020 census.

== Geography ==
According to the United States Census Bureau, the town has a total area of 0.4 square miles (1.0 km^{2}), all land.

== Demographics ==
Historical population
Census	Pop.	Note	%±
1930	416		—
1940	227		−45.4%
1950	190		−16.3%
1960	169		−11.1%
1970	206		21.9%
1980	223		8.3%
1990	302		35.4%
2000	360		19.2%
2010	1,119		210.8%
2020	973		−13.0%
U.S. Decennial Census

=== Racial and ethnic composition ===
Brunswick town, North Carolina – Racial and ethnic composition Note: the US Census treats Hispanic/Latino as an ethnic category. This table excludes Latinos from the racial categories and assigns them to a separate category. Hispanics/Latinos may be of any race.
Race / Ethnicity (NH = Non-Hispanic)	Pop 2000	Pop 2010	Pop 2020	% 2000	% 2010	% 2020
White alone (NH)	151	370	271	41.94%	33.07%	27.85%
Black or African American alone (NH)	198	629	575	55.00%	56.21%	59.10%
Native American or Alaska Native alone (NH)	7	37	17	1.94%	3.31%	1.75%
Asian alone (NH)	0	4	4	0.00%	0.36%	0.41%
Native Hawaiian or Pacific Islander alone (NH)	0	1	0	0.00%	0.09%	0.00%
Other race alone (NH)	0	1	1	0.00%	0.09%	0.10%
Mixed race or Multiracial (NH)	1	15	29	0.28%	1.34%	2.98%
Hispanic or Latino (any race)	3	62	76	0.83%	5.54%	7.81%
Total	360	1,119	973	100.00%	100.00%	100.00%

=== 2020 census ===
As of the 2020 United States census, there were 973 people, 172 households, and 113 families residing in the town.

=== 2000 census ===
At the 2000 census there were 360 people, 144 households, and 101 families in the town. The population density was 866.9 inhabitants per square mile (334.7/km^{2}). There were 165 housing units at an average density of 397.3 per square mile (153.4/km^{2}). The racial makeup of the town was 41.94% White, 55.00% African American, 2.78% Native American, and 0.28% from two or more races. Hispanic or Latino of any race were 0.83%.

Of the 144 households 27.1% had children under the age of 18 living with them, 40.3% were married couples living together, 26.4% had a female householder with no husband present, and 29.2% were non-families. 25.7% of households were one person and 9.7% were one person aged 65 or older. The average household size was 2.50 and the average family size was 3.02.

The age distribution was 23.6% under the age of 18, 10.8% from 18 to 24, 21.9% from 25 to 44, 23.9% from 45 to 64, and 19.7% 65 or older. The median age was 40 years. For every 100 females, there were 73.1 males. For every 100 females age 18 and over, there were 73.0 males.

The median household income was $15,795 and the median family income was $16,786. Males had a median income of $22,361 versus $20,625 for females. The per capita income for the town was $10,288. About 37.0% of families and 42.3% of the population were below the poverty line, including 72.4% of those under age 18 and 31.1% of those age 65 or over.
