= Pireway, North Carolina =

Unincorporated community in North Carolina, US

Coordinates: 34°01′38″N 78°38′16″W

Pireway (formerly Pireway Ferry) is an unincorporated community in Columbus County, North Carolina, United States, located at the intersection of North Carolina Highways 904 and 905. It lies at an elevation of 39 feet (12 m).
