= North Carolina Highway 133 =

State highway in North Carolina, US

North Carolina Highway 133
- NC 133 highlighted in red

Route information
- Maintained by NCDOT
- Length: 46.6 mi (75.0 km)
- Existed: 1961–present

Major junctions
- South end: Oak Island Drive in Oak Island
- NC 87 near Southport; US 17 / US 74 / US 76 / US 421 near Wilmington; I-140 near Wrightsboro; US 117 / NC 132 in Castle Hayne
- North end: NC 210 in Bells Crossroads

Location
- Country: United States
- State: North Carolina
- Counties: Brunswick, New Hanover, Pender

Highway system
- North Carolina Highway System; Interstate; US; State; Scenic
← NC 132	→ NC 134

North Carolina Highway 133 (NC 133) is a primary state highway in the U.S. state of North Carolina. It traverses 46.6 miles (75.0 km) from Oak Island Drive in Oak Island to NC 210 in Bells Crossroads. The route serves communities such as Southport, Belville, Leland, Wilmington, and Castle Hayne. Additionally, NC 133 serves as an entry point for Military Ocean Terminal Sunny Point located to its east. Much of NC 133 runs parallel to the Cape Fear River and Brunswick River between Southport and Belville. West of Wilmington, NC 133 runs concurrently with U.S. Route 17 (US 17), US 74, and US 76. The road follows another concurrency along US 74 and US 421, west of Downtown Wilmington, and crosses into New Hanover County on the Isabel Stellings Holmes Bridge. North of Wilmington, NC 133 exits to the north, serving several suburban communities north of Wilmington. NC 133 runs concurrently with US 117 through Castle Hayne, before bearing northwest toward Bells Crossroads.

As early as 1916, portions of NC 133, particularly between its northern terminus and Wilmington were added to the state's highway system as NC 40 and NC 60. The segment later was used for both U.S. Route 421 (US 421) and US 117. The southern portion between Belville and Southport remained unnumbered until 1951 when it was numbered as part of NC 130. In 1957, NC 40 was added as a primary route from NC 210 to Southport, replacing part of US 421 and NC 130. During this time, NC 40 was also extended south from Southport to Oak Island. Due to the establishment of Interstate 40 (I-40) in North Carolina, NC 40 was renumbered as NC 133 in 1961. Since its establishment, the routing around Wilmington has been adjusted, as new expressways have been built.

== Route description ==
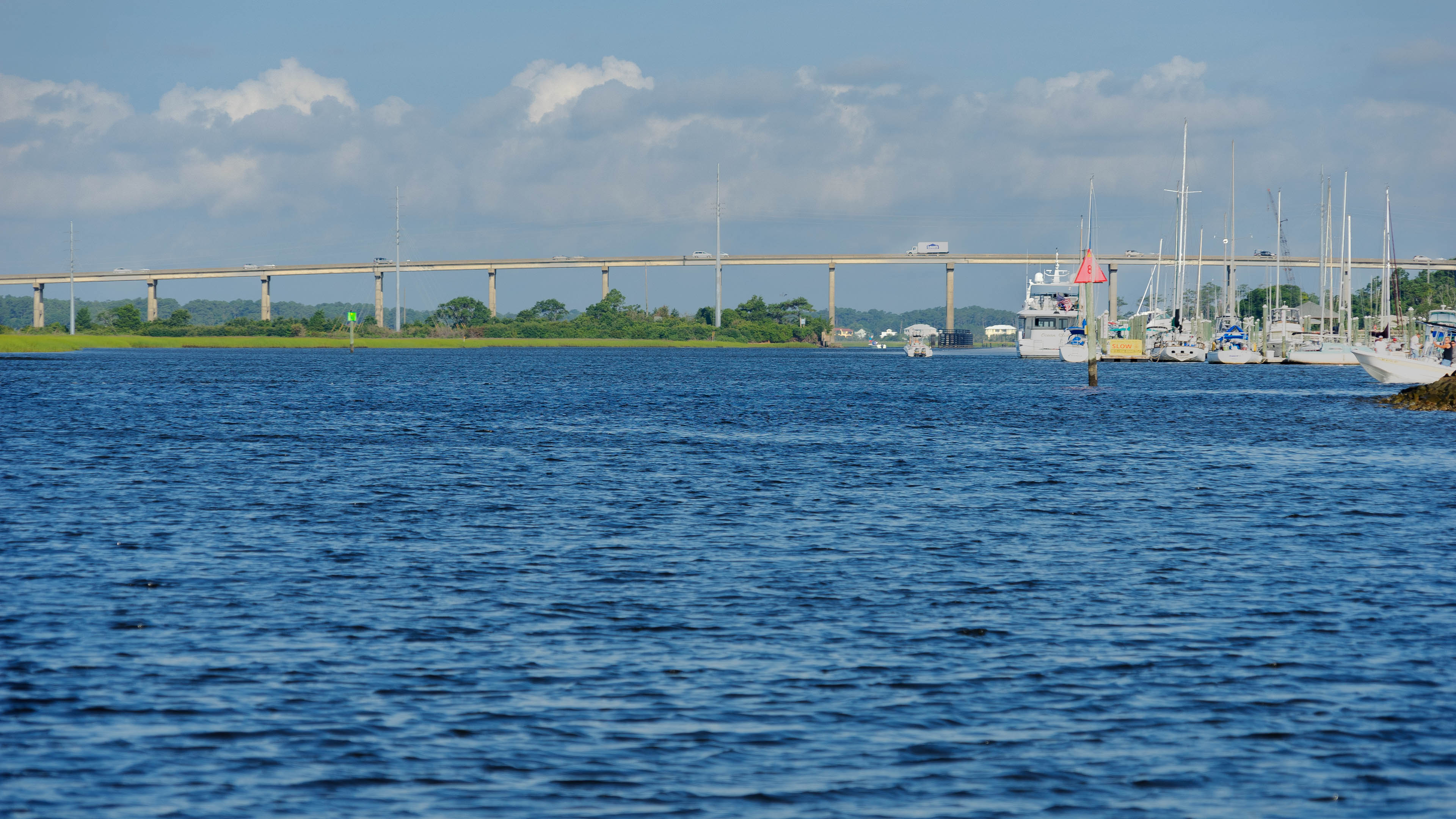
The G. V. Barbee Bridge carrying NC 133 across the Intracoastal Waterway near Oak Island.

NC 133 starts at the intersection of East Oak Island Drive and Country Club Drive near Yaupon Beach on Oak Island. The start of the road is just about one-half mile (0.80 km) from the Oak Island lighthouse, a tourist attraction in the area. Running north along Country Club Drive, NC 133 crosses the Intracoastal Waterway on the G. V. Barbee Bridge. The road name changes to Long Beach Road SE and passes the Cape Fear Regional Jetport to the east. 2.1 miles (3.4 km) north of the G. V. Barbee Bridge, NC 133 meets NC 211 (Southport-Supply Road SE) at an intersection northwest of Southport. The road briefly becomes a four-lane undivided road between Old Long Beach Road and an area just north of NC 211. North of the intersection, NC 133 continues northeast along Long Beach Road SE for 1.7 miles (2.7 km). At an intersection with, NC 87 (River Road SE), NC 133 turns to the north and runs concurrently with NC 87 for one mile (1.6 km). Near Boiling Spring Lakes, NC 133 turns right toward Wilmington, maintaining the name River Road SE. The border of Military Ocean Terminal Sunny Point coincides with the eastern side of the road in this area. Additionally, NC 133 runs to the south and east of Boiling Spring Lakes. Following the boundary of Military Ocean Terminal Sunny Point, NC 133 bears to the northeast until it nears Liliput Creek where it turns to the northwest. Access to Orton Plantation and Brunswick Town State Historical Site is located off of NC 133 north of Sunny Point. Between Liliput Creek and Belville, the road generally parallels both the Cape Fear River and Brunswick River. A historical marker dedicated to Robert Howe is located off of NC 133 in Belville. In Leland the road meets U.S. Route 17 (US 17), US 74, and US 76 at a diverging diamond interchange. NC 133 merges onto the freeway, running concurrently with US 17/US 74/US 76 across the Brunswick River.

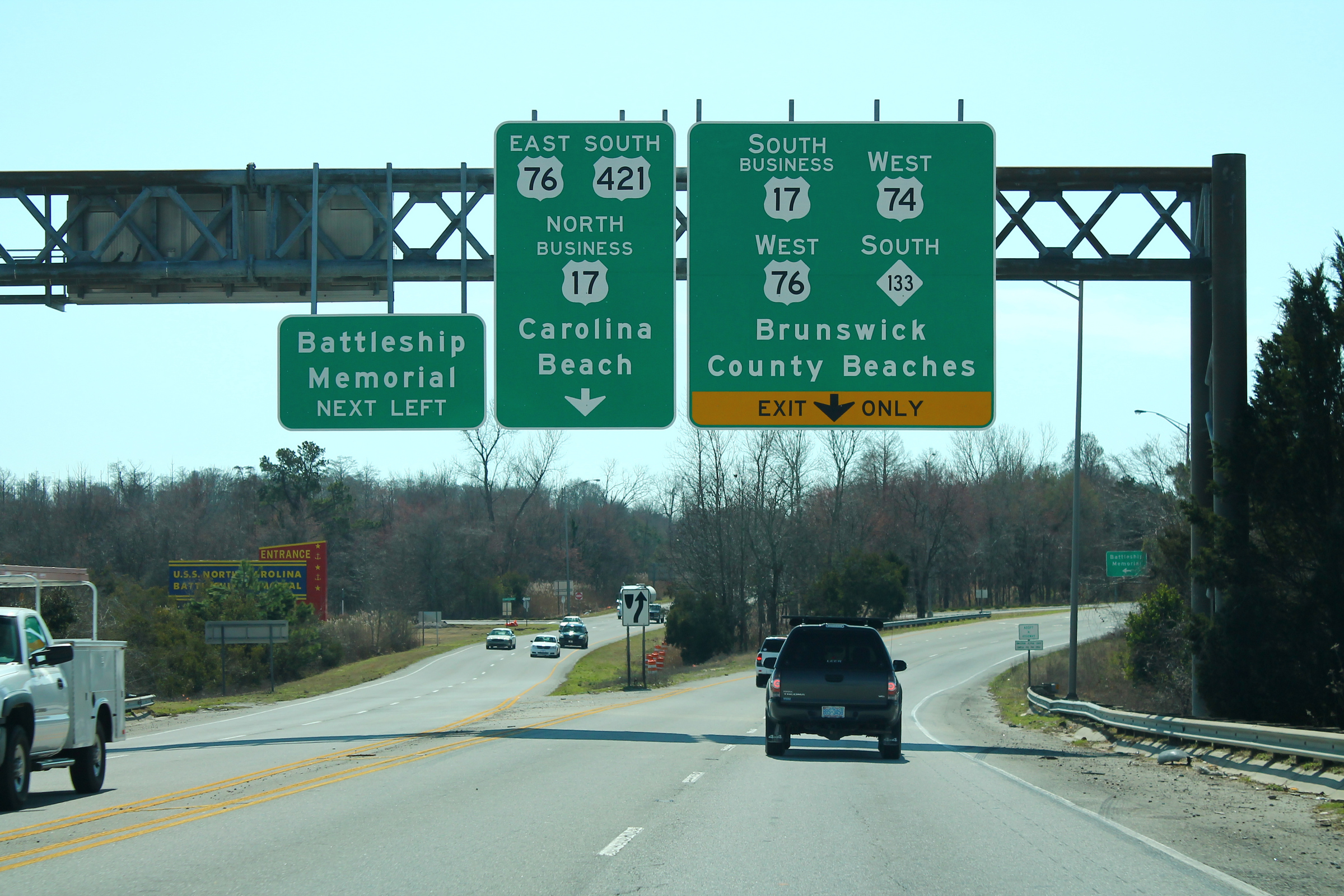
NC 133 at the trumpet interchange with US 17/US 74/US 76/US 421

NC 133 and US 74 exit the freeway at a trumpet interchange with US 421 west of Downtown Wilmington. US 17, US 76, and US 421 continue to the east and cross into downtown Wilmington via the Cape Fear Memorial Bridge. NC 133, US 74, and US 421 run concurrently to the north, paralleling the Northeast Cape Fear River. An intersection north of the trumpet interchange provides access to the USS North Carolina Battleship Memorial. The three routes pass over the Cape Fear River on the S. Thomas Rhodes Bridge. US 74 and NC 133 turn east from the north-south road and cross the Northeast Cape Fear River via the Isabel Stellings Holmes Bridge. Following an interchange with Third Street, the roads run concurrently along the Martin Luther King Jr. Parkway. NC 133 exits off the freeway at Castle Hayne Road in the community of Hightsville. Following Castle Hayne Road to the north, NC 133 goes through Wrightsboro, a census-designated community north of downtown Wilmington. Wilmington International Airport is located east of NC 133, with access from 23rd Street and Gordon Road. NC 133 meets Interstate 140 (I-140) north of Wrightsboro at a partial cloverleaf interchange. Near Skippers Corner, NC 133 meets US 117 and NC 132 at a roundabout. NC 132 ends at the roundabout, and NC 133 exits to the north, running concurrently with US 117. NC 133 and US 117 both run through Castle Hayne and cross over the Northeast Cape Fear River, entering Pender County. North of the bridge, NC 133 turns left at Old Blossom Ferry Road and follows the road to the northwest. The route is primarily rural north of Castle Hayne, passing south of Cape Fear Elementary School and Cape Fear Middle School. NC 133 ends at an intersection with NC 210 in Bells Crossroads.

North Carolina Bicycle Route 5 runs concurrently along NC 133 from the northernmost US 17/US 421 intersection, across the Isabel Stellings Holmes Bridge, to Third Street in Wilmington.

== History ==
The routing of modern-day NC 133 was established in 1916 when North Carolina created a highway running from Wilmington, through Castle Hayne and Bells Crossroads, towards Clinton. The section between Bells Crossroads and Castle Hayne became part of NC 60; while the section south of Castle Hayne to Wilmington became part of NC 40. By 1931, US 17-1 ran concurrently with NC 40 along the entire route, including the segment from Wilmington to Castle Hayne. US 117 replaced US 17-1 along the Castle Hayne to Wilmington segment in 1933. The same year, US 421 was extended concurrent with NC 60 from Bells Crossroads to Castle Hayne. US 421 was extended south along US 117 in 1935. This replaced NC 40 to Wilmington, while NC 60 was also removed from the concurrent routing.

Beginning in 1940, an improved road was created from NC 130 (modern-day NC 211) to Oak Island. A 24-mile (39 km) segment between Belville and Southport first appeared on North Carolina maps beginning in 1941 as an unnumbered gravel-topsoil road. South of Liliput Creek, the road followed an eastern route, which ran parallel to the Cape Fear River and followed East Moore Street into Southport. The road was improved from US 17/US 74/US 76 to Orton Plantation in 1948. In 1951, the segment was completely improved, and NC 130 was extended along the road from Southport to Belville. North of Wilmington, US 421 was removed from the routing between Bells Crossroads and Wilmington in 1954. NC 210 was routed along the segment from Bells Crossroads to US 117 north of Castle Hayne.

North Carolina Highway 40
- Location: Oak Island–Bells Crossroads, NC
- Length: 47.9 mi (77.1 km)
- Existed: 1957–1961

The third and final designation of NC 40 was established from Bells Crossroads to Southport in 1957, as a partial renumbering of NC 210 and NC 130. The highway also ran concurrently with US 117 from Castle Hayne to Wilmington, and US 17/US 74/US 76/US 421 west of Wilmington. Following the establishment of Military Ocean Terminal Sunny Point, NC 40 was rerouted along new routing along the western edge of the installation. It then ran concurrent with NC 87 to Southport. The highway was extended south from Southport to Oak Island in 1960, running concurrently along NC 211 for 1 mile (1.6 km). In 1961, NC 40 was renumbered as NC 133 with the establishment of I-40 in North Carolina.

In 1969, the routing of NC 133 was adjusted to its modern route between the Brunswick River and Northeast Cape Fear River. NC 133 ran concurrently with US 17/US 74/US 76 in Brunswick County until reaching US 421 at an interchange. NC 133 then ran concurrently with US 421 north to the Isabel Stellings Holmes Bridge, where it crossed the Northeast Cape Fear River concurrent with US 117. Both highways then followed Front Street and Fourth Street in downtown Wilmington, along with Cornelius Harnett Drive and Castle Hayne Road towards Wrightsboro. In 1978, NC 133 was placed onto the modern-day freeway between Belville and US 421, running concurrently with US 17/US 74/US 76. Between 1980 and 1984, the section of NC 133 running concurrently with US 421 was mulitlaned and adjusted slightly to the west NC 133 was removed from its routing along North Front Street, North Fourth Street, Cornelius Harnett Drive, and Castle Hayne Road in 2005. This temporary gap in the route was due to the construction of the Martin Luther King Jr. Parkway in Downtown Wilmington. The route was reestablished in February 2008 via the Martin Luther King Jr. Parkway.

In 2014, construction began on the 2.2-mile-long (3.5 km) Long Beach Road Extension in Brunswick County which removed NC 133 from a concurrency with NC 211 and shortened its concurrency with NC 87. The project was completed on January 10, 2016. In 2016, construction on a diverging diamond interchange was completed at the US 17/US 74/US 76 interchange in Leland.

== Future ==
The Wilmington Urban Area Metropolitan Planning Organization (WMPO) has identified three projects to be completed along NC 133 in New Hanover and Brunswick Counties. A widening project along Castle Hayne Road, between US 74 (Martin Luther King Jr. Parkway) and I-140 is planned to begin construction in 2030. The installation of a roundabout at the intersection of NC 133 and 23rd Street is projected to begin right of way acquisitions in 2022, with construction beginning in 2024. Additionally, the WMPO plans for the creation of a flyover interchange at the current intersection between NC 133, US 74, and US 421 west of the Isabel Stellings Holmes Bridge. Construction of the flyovers is expected to begin in 2024.

== Major intersections ==
County	Location	mi	km	Destinations	Notes
Brunswick	Oak Island	0.0	0.0	To NC 906 (Oak Island Drive / Country Club Drive) – Caswell Beach, Fort Caswell	
Brunswick	Intracoastal Waterway	0.3	0.48	G. V. Barbee Bridge	
Brunswick		3.5	5.6	NC 211 (Southport-Supply Road) – Southport, Supply	
Brunswick		5.2	8.4	NC 87 south (River Road) – Southport	South end of NC 87 overlap
Brunswick		6.2	10.0	NC 87 north (George II Highway) – Boiling Spring Lakes	North end of NC 87 overlap
Brunswick	Leland	26.6	42.8	US 17 south / US 74 / US 76 west – Shallotte, Myrtle Beach, Whiteville	South end of US 17 and west end of US 74/US 76 overlap
Brunswick		28.2	45.4	US 17 north / US 76 east / US 421 south – Wilmington, Carolina Beach	North end of US 17, east end of US 76 and south end of US 421 overlap
New Hanover	Cape Fear River	29.4	47.3	S. Thomas Rhodes Bridge	
New Hanover		30.1	48.4	US 421 north to I-140 – Jacksonville, Clinton	North end of US 421 overlap
New Hanover	Northeast Cape Fear River	30.5	49.1	Isabel Stellings Holmes Bridge	
New Hanover	Wilmington	30.7	49.4	North Third Street – Wilmington Downtown	Interchange
New Hanover	Wilmington	31.4	50.5	McRae Street	Northbound exit and southbound entrance
New Hanover	Wilmington	31.9	51.3	US 74 east (Martin Luther King Jr. Parkway) – Wrightsville Beach	East end of US 74 overlap
New Hanover		36.2	58.3	I-140 – Jacksonville, Shallotte, Myrtle Beach	I-140 exit 17
New Hanover	Castle Hayne	38.8	62.4	US 117 / NC 132 south – Carolina Beach	South end of US 117 overlap
Pender		41.7	67.1	US 117 north – Burgaw	North end of US 117 overlap
Pender	Bells Crossroads	46.6	75.0	NC 210 – Elizabethtown, Rocky Point	
1.000 mi = 1.609 km; 1.000 km = 0.621 mi: Concurrency terminus; Incomplete access
