= U.S. Route 76 =

Highway in the United States

U.S. Route 76
- US 76 highlighted in red

Route information
- Length: 548 mi (882 km)
- Existed: 1926–present

Major junctions
- West end: US 41 / US 72 in Chattanooga, TN
- I-24 in Chattanooga, TN; I-75 once in TN and twice in GA; I-85 near Anderson, SC; I-26 / US 176 in Irmo, SC; I-20 in Columbia, SC; I-126 / US 21 / US 176 / US 321 in Columbia, SC; I-77 in Columbia, SC; I-95 in Florence, SC; I-140 near Wilmington, NC
- East end: Water Street in Wrightsville Beach, NC

Location
- Country: United States
- States: Tennessee, Georgia, South Carolina, North Carolina

Highway system
- United States Numbered Highway System; List; Special; Divided
← US 75	→ US 77

U.S. Route 76 (US 76) is an east–west U.S. highway in the Southeastern United States that travels for 548 miles (882 km). Its western terminus is at US 41 and the eastern terminus of US 72 (Broad Street) in the city of Chattanooga, Tennessee, where it travels in a generally due east direction, to its eastern terminus at Wrightsville Beach, North Carolina. It travels through the cities of Chattanooga, Tennessee, Ringgold, Georgia, Columbia and Florence, South Carolina, and Wilmington, North Carolina.

== Route description ==
Lengths
	mi	km
TN	8.9	14.3
GA	150.7	242.5
SC	297.9	479.4
NC	79	127
Total	548	882

=== Tennessee ===
In the state of Tennessee, US-76 is an arterial road that travels east-southeast from Downtown Chattanooga to East Ridge and south to the Georgia state line. US-76 travels concurrent with US-41 for its entire length in Tennessee, about 8.9 miles (14.3 km).

=== Georgia ===
In Georgia, US 76 traverses the northern part of the state and passes through the Chattahoochee-Oconee National Forest and Georgia's most mountainous region. US 76 passes through Catoosa, Whitfield, Murray, Gilmer, Fannin, Union, Towns, and Rabun counties.

=== South Carolina ===
US 76 enters South Carolina across the Chattooga River, then continues southeast toward Westminster. This segment is a moderately windy two-lane road. In Westminster, it heads east toward Seneca and Clemson. From Clemson, the road heads southeast toward Anderson, intersecting Interstate 85 (I-85), then east toward the small towns of Belton and Honea Path. US 76 is a four-lane highway from Westminster to Anderson. In Anderson, the road widens to six lanes with a reversible turn lane. After a concurrency with US 178, the road narrows to five lanes, and, as it goes south towards downtown Anderson, it narrows again to four. However, the sections around Seneca, Clemson, and Anderson are well developed with many traffic lights. It travels concurrent with US 123 from Westminster to Clemson, SC 28 from Seneca to Anderson, and US 178 from Anderson to Honea Path.

From Honea Path, the highway heads east to Laurens. This section is a rural two-lane road that is not frequently traveled. From Laurens, US 76 roughly parallels I-385 and I-26 as it heads to Columbia. US 76 provides local access to the communities of Laurens, Clinton, Newberry, Prosperity, Chapin, and the other smaller towns in the area. In Irmo, US 76 travels concurrent with US 176, then continues on to I-26, with which it travels concurrently. After the interchange with I-20, US 76 splits off from I-26 and continues into downtown Columbia concurrent with I-126.

In Columbia, US 76 follows Elmwood Avenue, Bull Street, Gervais Street, Millwood Avenue, and Devine Street before heading east toward Sumter. The segment from Columbia to Sumter is a four-lane highway and US 76 is concurrent with US 378 from the intersection of Bull and Gervais near the University of South Carolina in Columbia to Sumter. From Sumter, US 76 heads northeast to Florence. US 76 is the major road through Florence. It then continues east out of Florence to the small towns of Marion and Mullins, then into North Carolina. The highway is concurrent with US 301 from Florence to across the Pee Dee River.

=== North Carolina ===
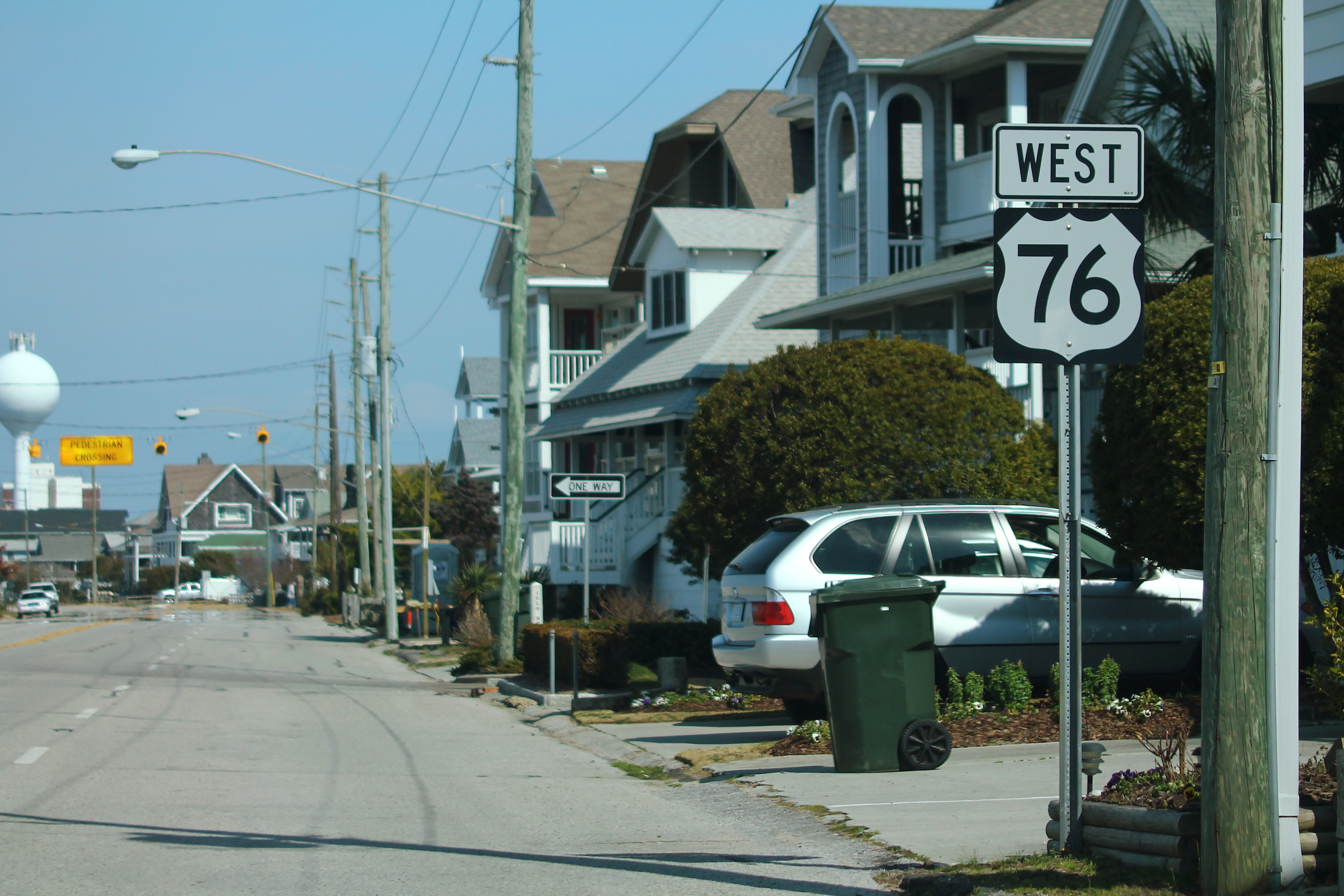
A westbound sign for U.S. Route 76 located in Wrightsville Beach.

The highway passes through Fair Bluff and becomes concurrent with US 74 from Chadbourn to Wilmington. The highway is mostly four lanes, divided with at-grade and controlled intersections. The speed limit is from 45 mph (72 km/h) to 70 mph (110 km/h). It crosses the Cape Fear Memorial Bridge into Wilmington and continues to Wrightsville Beach via Oleander Drive to the route's eastern terminus. US 76 traverses 80.3 miles (129.2 km) in North Carolina; approximately 54 miles (87 km) concurrent with US 74, between Chadbourn and Wilmington.

== History ==
A significant section of US 76 was relocated in Georgia during the 1980s with the old alignment decommissioned first in 1982 from the Hemptown community in Fannin County westward and eastward into Union County in 1988. Extending from west of Blue Ridge to Blairsville, the 35-mile (56 km) stretch of road today is known as Blue Ridge Highway and Old Highway 76 including the city of Morganton. In Morganton, the stretch is joined briefly by SR 60, and, in Blairsville, a small portion of the route is unofficially part of US 19/US 129. This old alignment from Blairsville to Blue Ridge is approximately 37 miles (60 km) long and has some of Georgia's most scenic views along its eastern end. This stretch was formerly part of SR 2, as well.

US 76 also has other old alignments in Ellijay (by-passed in 1982), Cherry Log, Whitepath (both bypassed in 1989) and south of Blue Ridge (by-passed in 1965). US 76 was also relocated from present-day SR 52 from Ellijay to Chatsworth in 1981 to a less treacherous course along SR 282. Significant curve realignments also occurred along the previously serpentine section from Hiawassee to Clayton from 1988 to 2005. Today, US 76 shares mileage with SR 5, SR 515, SR 282, SR 61, SR 52, SR 17, SR 75, SR 15, and SR 3, in addition to SR 2. U.S. highways with common mileage include US 411, US 41, US 441, and US 23.

Formerly, US 76 followed a longer route from Westminster to Pendleton. From Westminster, the old route followed S-37-13 through the Richland community, then its current alignment to SC 59 into downtown Seneca, then SC 130 out of Seneca to S-37-1, then its current alignment to SC 93 toward Clemson University, then SC 28 Business through Pendleton.

US 76 did not appear in North Carolina until late 1934 into 1935. It replaced NC 202 and US 17 from the South Carolina border to Chadbourn, US 17 and NC 20 to Wilmington and NC 20 to Wrightsville Beach. The original US 76 followed the current alignment of the road from the South Carolina state line to Chadbourn. US 76 then followed NC 214 north of Lake Waccamaw and through Bolton. It then followed the current alignment to Leland. US 76 then used Office Road, Lincoln Road, Old Mill Road, to get to Village Road NE. US 76 then used the closed causeway to cross the Brunswick River. From Belville US 76 used NC 133 routing to cross the Cape Fear and NE Cape Fear River's. US 76 then went down 3rd Street to Market Street and then followed 17th Street to Oleander Drive. US 76 then used Arlie Road to where US 76 currently crosses into Wrightsville Beach. US 76 then turned north on Lumina Avenue to the current end point of US 74. In 1936 US 74/US 76 was given a short bypass around Leland using Village Road. The old part became US 74-A. In 1940, US 76 was removed off the routing along Lumina Avenue and was instead routed south along Waynick Drive to the southern part of the island. Sometime between 1959 and 1962, US 76 was removed off Arlie Drive, and instead, US 76 followed Oleander Drive all the way to Causeway Drive. In 1966, US 76 was moved onto split roads along both 16th and 17th streets in downtown Wilmington. In 1969, US 76 was redirected to use a new bridge to cross the Cape Fear River into Wilmington. US 76 would also now use Dawson and Wooster Streets through downtown Wilmington. In 1975, US 76 and US 74 were placed on a new freeway that bypassed both Leland and Belville; along with that, US 76 was placed on a new freeway that bypassed Chadbourn. Between 1986 and 1987, US 76 was placed on a bypass of Hallsboro and Lake Waccamaw. Around 1992, US 76 was routed to bypass Bolton leaving behind NC 214. In 2003, US 76 was moved onto Military Cutoff Road instead of being on Wrightsville Avenue.

== Major intersections ==
Tennessee
US 41 / US 72 in Chattanooga. US 41/US 76 travels concurrently to east of Dalton, Georgia.
US 11 / US 64 in Chattanooga. The highways travel concurrently through Chattanooga.
I-24 in Chattanooga
I-75 in East Ridge
Georgia
I-75 southeast of Ringgold
US 411 in Chatsworth. The highways travel concurrently to south-southeast of Chatsworth.
US 19 / US 129 in Blairsville. The highways travel concurrently to northeast of Blairsville.
US 23 / US 441 in Clayton. The highways travel concurrently through Clayton.
South Carolina
US 123 in Westminster. The highways travel concurrently to Clemson.
I-85 in Northlake
US 178 in Northlake. The highways travel concurrently to Honea Path.
US 29 in Anderson. The highways travel concurrently through Anderson.
US 25 northwest of Princeton. The highways travel concurrently for approximately 1.2 miles (1.9 km).
US 221 in Laurens
US 176 north-northwest of Irmo. The highways travel concurrently to Irmo.
I-26 / US 176 in Irmo. I-26/US 76 travels concurrently to Columbia.
I-20 on the Seven Oaks–St. Andrews CDP line
I-26 / I-126 in Columbia. I-126/US 76 travels concurrently through Columbia.
I-126 / US 21 / US 176 / US 321 in Columbia. US 21/US 76/US 176/US 321 travels concurrently through Columbia.
US 1 / US 378 in Columbia. US 1/US 76 travels concurrently through Columbia. US 76/US 378 travels concurrently to East Sumter.
I-77 in Columbia
US 601 north of Eastover
US 521 in Sumter
US 15 in Sumter
US 401 in Sumter
I-95 southwest of Florence
US 52 in Florence
US 301 east of Florence. The highways travel concurrently to Pee Dee.
US 501 in Marion
North Carolina
Future I-74 / US 74 northeast of Chadbourn. I-74/US 76 will travel concurrently to east-northeast of Whiteville. US 74/US 76 travels concurrently to Eagle Island.
US 701 in Whiteville
I-140 northwest of Leland
US 17 in Leland. The highways travel concurrently to Eagle Island.
US 17 / US 74 / US 421 on Eagle Island. US 76/US 421 travels concurrently to Wilmington.
US 117 in Wilmington
US 74 in Wilmington. The highways travel concurrently to Wrightsville Beach.
Jack Parker Boulevard/Water Street in Wrightsville Beach

== See also ==
- Cape Fear River
- Chattahoochee-Oconee National Forest
- Hiwassee River
- Lake Hartwell
- Lake Murray
- Lake Waccamaw
- Lumber River State Park
- Pee Dee River
- Saluda River
- Savannah River
- Shaw Air Force Base
- Sumter National Forest
- Tennessee River
- USS North Carolina (BB-55)
- Waccamaw River

== Special routes ==
- Special routes of U.S. Route 76

== Related routes ==
- U.S. Route 176 - runs from U.S. Route 25 Business/North Carolina Highway 225 in Hendersonville, North Carolina to U.S. Route 52 in Goose Creek, South Carolina. The Route closely parallels Interstate 26 for its entire route.
- U.S. Route 276 runs from Interstate 385 in Greenville, South Carolina to Interstate 40 in Cove Creek, North Carolina.
