= U.S. Route 76 in North Carolina =

Section of highway in North Carolina

U.S. Highway 76
- US 76 highlighted in red

Route information
- Maintained by NCDOT
- Length: 80.4 mi (129.4 km)
- Existed: 1935–present

Major junctions
- West end: US 76 at the South Carolina state line near Fair Bluff
- US 74 in Chadbourn; US 701 in Whiteville; I-140 near Leland; US 17 in Leland; US 74 / US 421 / NC 133 in Wilmington; US 117 / NC 132 in Wilmington; US 17 / US 74 in Wilmington; US 74 in Wrightsville Beach
- East end: Water Street in Wrightsville Beach

Location
- Country: United States
- State: North Carolina
- Counties: Columbus, Brunswick, New Hanover

Highway system
- United States Numbered Highway System; List; Special; Divided; North Carolina Highway System; Interstate; US; State; Scenic
← NC 75	→ I-77

U.S. Highway 76 (US 76) is a U.S. Highway running from Chattanooga, Tennessee to Wrightsville Beach, North Carolina. In North Carolina the highway runs for 80.4 miles (129.4 km) in the southeastern region of the state. US 76 enters the state from South Carolina south of Fair Bluff in Columbus County. Travelling in an eastward direction, US 76 meets US 74 in Chadbourn. The two highways run concurrently for 50.4 miles (81.1 km) between Chadbourn and Wilmington. US 76 runs concurrently with US 17 along much of its Wilmington routing, until once again meeting US 74. US 76 and US 74 run concurrently for 1.4 miles (2.3 km) until reaching Wrightsville Beach. US 76 reaches its eastern terminus on the south side of Wrightsville Beach, at an intersection with Water Street.

As early as 1916, portions of modern-day US 76, between Wilmington and Whiteville were added to the North Carolina state highway system. By 1924, North Carolina Highway 202 (NC 202) was assigned to the routing between South Carolina and Chadbourn. The routing between Chadbourn and Wrightsville Beach became part of NC 20, which continued west to Asheville. While US 76 was an original U.S. highway, it initially ran between Chattanooga, Tennessee and Florence, South Carolina. The remainder of the route between Florence and Wilmington was signed as part of US 17. In 1935, US 17 was rerouted similar to its current routing, and US 76 was extended to Wrightsville Beach over the former routing of US 17. While the majority of the routing has remained roughly the same, much of the highway between Chadbourn and Wilmington has been placed on new freeways. The section of US 76 between Chadbourn and Bolton is considered to be a future section of Interstate 74 (I-74).

== Route description ==
US 76 runs for 80.4 miles (129.4 km) across Columbus, Brunswick, and New Hanover Counties. The majority of US 76 in North Carolina is part of the National Highway System, a network of highways in the United States which serve strategic transportation facilities. There are two exceptions, one along Oleander Drive and Military Cutoff Road between US 421 (Third Street) and US 74 (Eastwood Road) in Wilmington, and another from the C. Heide Trask Bridge in Wrightsville Beach to the eastern terminus of US 76.

=== Columbus County ===
US 76 crosses the North Carolina–South Carolina state line between Horry County, South Carolina and Columbus County, North Carolina near Fair Bluff. US 76 continues north for approximately 1.7 miles (2.7 km) before entering into Fair Bluff. Upon reaching the town limits, the highway is named as Main Street. As US 76 approaches the Lumber River, it begins a gradual turn to the northeast which is completed before reaching NC 904. US 76 and NC 904 share a 0.4 miles (640 m) concurrency through downtown Fair Bluff. At Conway Road, NC 904 turns to the southeast and runs toward Tabor City. Exiting Fair Bluff to the east, US 76 runs parallel to a former Atlantic Coast Line Railroad, currently operated by the R.J. Corman Railroad Group. The highway forms the northern limit of the town of Cerro Gordo, providing access to several businesses located off the highway. US 76 intersects the southern terminus of NC 242 at an intersection with Powell Street and the Haynes Gordon Highway. The highway exits the town to the east, crossing over a creek named Cerro Gordo.

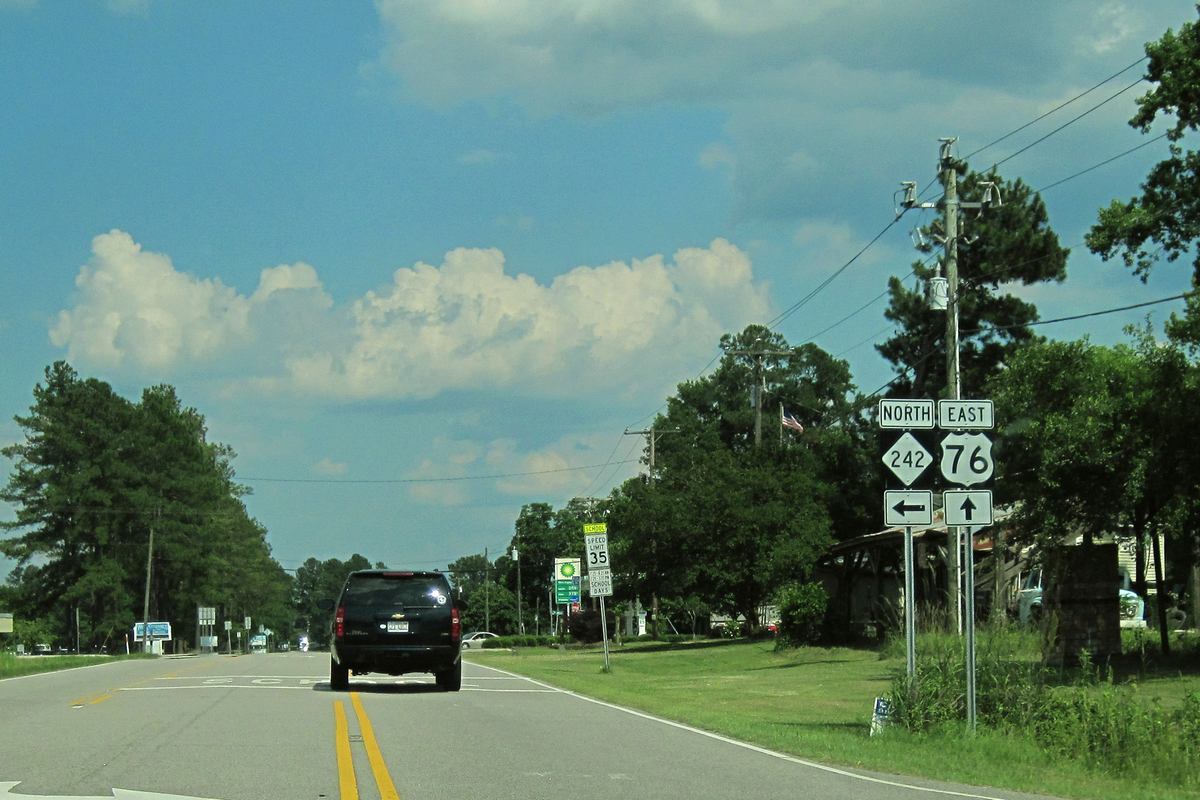
US 76 at the southern terminus of NC 242 in Cerro Gordo

US 76 continues east through a rural area of Columbus County toward Chadbourn. The highway briefly enters the town limits but is routed to the north of the central business area of Chadbourn. US 76 intersects US 74 Business, US 76 Business, NC 130, and NC 410 at the Joe Brown Highway. US 76 continues east for approximately one mile (one point six kilometres) before merging onto the US 74 freeway toward Wilmington. The US 74 and US 76 interchange near Chadbourn is incomplete, as there is only westbound access to US 76 and an eastbound entrance to US 74 and US 76. US 74 and US 76 begins a concurrency for 50.4 miles (81.1 km).

US 74 and US 76 approaches Whiteville from the west and bypasses the city to the north. A partial cloverleaf interchange with US 701 is located north of downtown Whiteville. East of Whiteville, the highway crosses the White Marsh which drains to the Waccamaw River. US 76 meets the eastern termini of US 74 Business and US 76 Business at an interchange between Whiteville and Hallsboro. The exit also provides access to the western terminus of NC 214 which begins to parallels the highway until Bolton. The highway meets Hallsboro Road at a diamond interchange north of Hallsboro. Continuing east, US 76 passes north of Lake Waccamaw. The freeway ends at an at-grade intersection with Chaunceytown Road, northwest of the town of Lake Waccamaw. US 74 and US 76 continue east as a four-lane divided highway, bypassing Bolton to the north. The highway meets NC 211 at an interchange northwest of the downtown area of Bolton. Making a gradual turn to the southeast, the highway meets the eastern terminus of NC 214 at an at-grade intersection. US 74 and US 76 continues east along a rather straight alignment before meeting the southern terminus of NC 11 at an at-grade intersection. After crossing Livingston Creek, US 74 and US 76 enter the community of Delco from the east, running through the central business area. In the southeastern side of Delco, the highway meets NC 87, which runs concurrently with US 74 and US 76 to the east.

=== Brunswick County ===
US 76 enters Brunswick County 1.8 miles (2.9 km) east of Delco along with US 74 and NC 87. The highway runs slightly to the southeast, passing through the northern area of Sandy Creek. At the community of Maco, US 74 and US 76 intersects NC 87 (Maco Road) and Northwest Road at an at-grade intersection which marks the eastern end of the NC 87 concurrency. US 74 and US 76 continue to the east and near Malmo, the highway begins to parallel a railroad owned and operated by CSX Transportation. East of Malmo, US 74 and US 76 meets I-140 (Wilmington Bypass) at a partial cloverleaf interchange (I-140 exit 5).

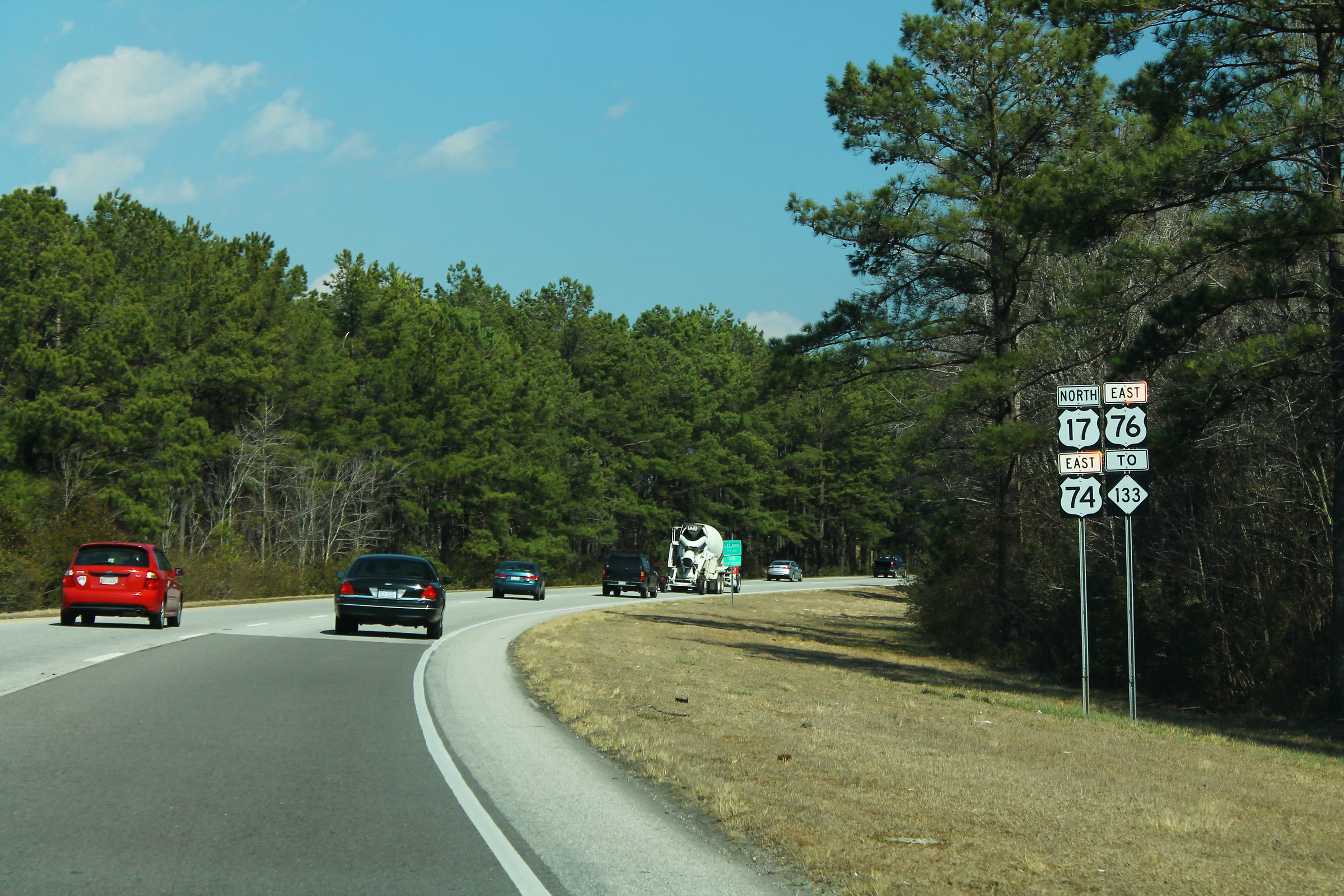
Highway markers for US 17, US 74, and US 76 along the freeway in Leland

US 74 and US 76 have several at-grade intersections east of I-140, providing access to several businesses located alongside the highway. After Mercantile Drive, US 74 and US 76 become a freeway again. A diamond interchange is located 0.4 miles (640 m) to the east, providing access to Lanvale Road and Mount Misery Road. The freeway makes a turn to the southeast, crossing over Village Road and the railroad operated by CSX Transportation. Entering into Leland, the highway runs through a residential area, crossing over Sturgeon Creek and under Old Fayetteville Road. As the freeway approaches US 17, it begins a gradual turn to the northeast. US 74 and US 76 reaches a modified trumpet interchange with US 17 (Ocean Highway) within the gradual curve. US 17 begins to run concurrently with US 74 and US 76 to the east toward Wilmington. The highway then meets NC 133 roughly 0.6 miles (970 m) to the east at a diverging diamond interchange, providing access to the central business area of Leland and Belville. Here, NC 133 begins to run concurrently with US 17, US 74, and US 76 to the east. East of the exit, the freeway widens from four to six lanes, with three lanes in each direction. The freeway crosses the Brunswick River and Alligator Creek before meeting US 421 at a trumpet interchange. US 74 and NC 133 exit the freeway and run concurrently with US 421 to the north while US 421 merges onto the freeway and crosses the Cape Fear River along the Cape Fear Memorial Bridge.

=== New Hanover County ===
After crossing the Cape Fear River, US 17, US 76, and US 421 enters into New Hanover County. An exit for Front Street and US 421 Truck is located on the bridge's eastern approach. Immediately following the exit, the highway median widens to match with Wooster Street and Dawson Street in downtown Wilmington. The freeway ends at an at-grade intersection with Third Street where the US 421 concurrency ends and US 17 and US 76 are split onto Dawson Street (eastbound) and Wooster Street (westbound). The dual streets serve a mixture of residential and commercial businesses that are located off the highway. The two streets join back together east of 16th Street and form Oleander Drive. Turning to the southeast, Oleander Drive crosses another railroad owned and operated by CSX Transportation at an at-grade crossing. US 17 and US 76 enters a residential area located between Mimosa Place and Independence Boulevard, and passes north of the Cape Fear Country Club. East of Independence Boulevard, US 76 provides access to multiple commercial businesses including Independence Mall. The road makes a slight curve between 41st Street and 42nd Street, giving US 76 a slightly more eastern orientation.

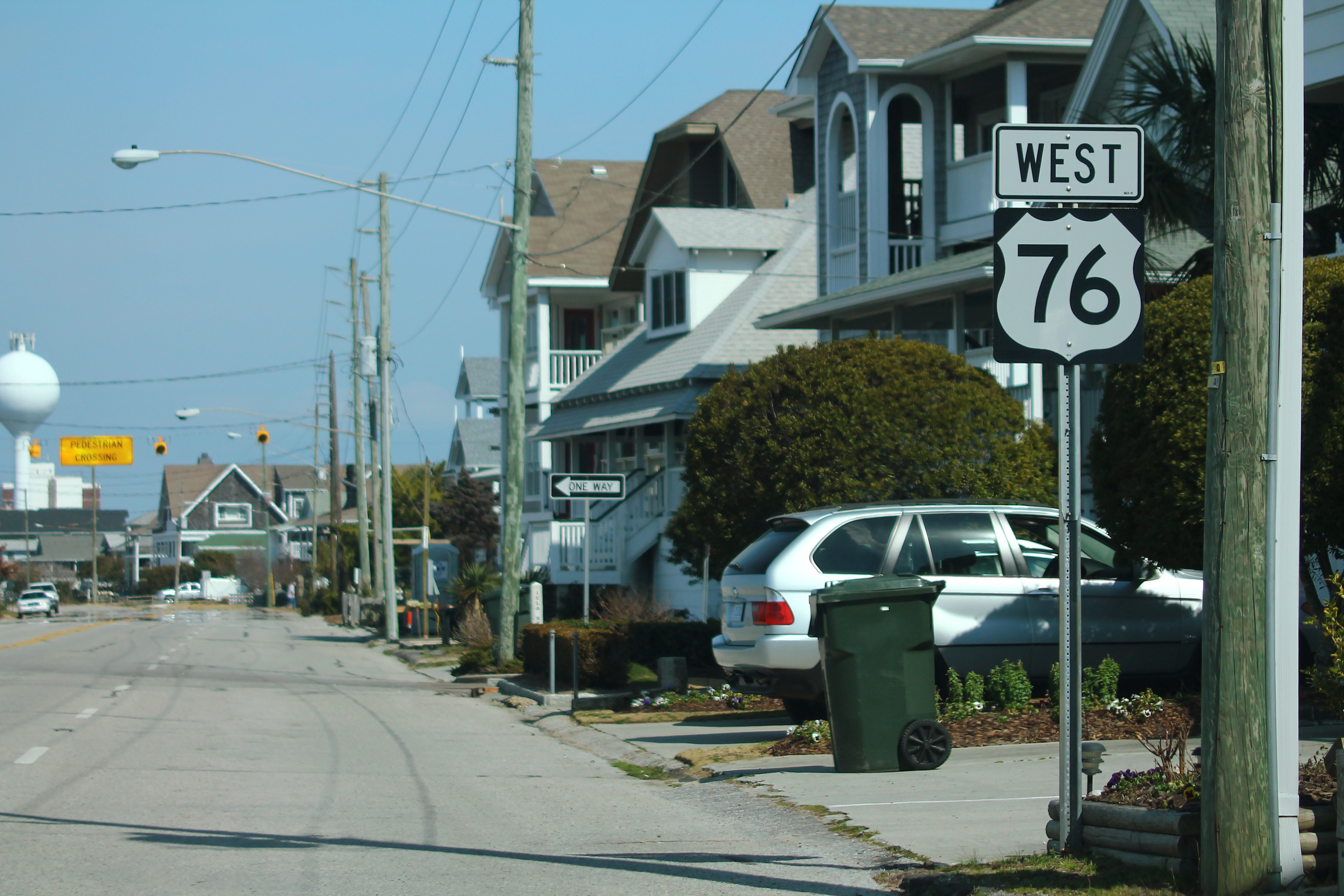
A US 76 marker along Waynick Boulevard in Wrightsville Beach

US 17 and US 76 meets US 117 and NC 132 at South College Road. The intersection is considered to be one of the busiest in Wilmington with an average of 70,500 cars crossing daily in 2019. US 17 and US 76 continue east along Oleander Drive, paralleling Wrightsville Avenue to the south. At Greenville Loop Road, the highway turns to the north and crosses the sound on the Trooper Clarence L. Swartz Bridge. At an intersection with Wrightsville Avenue and Airlie Road, the road name changes from Oleander Drive to Military Cuttoff Road. The highway continues north for 0.6 miles (970 m) until reaching US 74 at Eastwood Road. US 76 turns east to follow US 74, while US 17 continues north along Military Cutoff Road. US 74 and US 76 run concurrently for 1.4 miles (2.3 km) toward Wrightsville Beach. The road name switches from Eastwood Road to Wrightsville Avenue at an intersection with Wrightsville Avenue. US 74 and US 76 cross the Intracoastal Waterway on the C. Heide Trask Memorial Bridge, crossing into Wrightsville Beach. The two highways briefly run concurrently along Causeway Drive, before splitting at Salisbury Street. US 76 bears to the right to continue on Causeway Drive, running through a residential area of Wrightsville Beach. The highway crosses over Banks Channel before meeting Waynick Boulevard. US 76 turns south to follow Waynick Boulevard, paralleling Banks Channel on its eastern shore. Waynick Boulevard makes a sharp turn to the east and becomes Sunset Avenue, before ending at Lumina Avenue. US 76 turns to the south to follow Lumina Avenue toward the southern side of Wrightsville Beach. At the end of Lumina Avenue, the highway makes a sharp right turn and briefly heads west along Jack Parker Boulevard. The eastern terminus of US 76 coincides with the end of Jack Parker Boulevard, located at an intersection with Water Street.

== History ==
North Carolina Highway 202
- Location: SC State Line–Chadbourn, NC
- Length: 15 mi (24 km)
- Existed: 1921–1934

As early as 1916, a portion of US 76 between Chadbourn and Wilmington was a thoroughfare in southeastern North Carolina. The highway between Chadbourn and the Columbus County-Brunswick County line was an unimproved road while the section in Brunswick County and New Hanover County was an improved highway. Upon the creation of the North Carolina State Highway System in 1921, the highway between Chadbourn and Wrightsville Beach was numbered as part of NC 20. The segment between the South Carolina state line and Chadbourn was numbered as part of NC 202. In 1924, NC 202 was an unimproved road for its entire length. Portions of NC 20 between Chadbourn and Whiteville, as well as between Bolton and Wrightsville Beach were improved roadways. By 1926, the entirety of NC 20 was improved between Chadbourn and Wrightsville Beach.

Upon the creation of the United States Numbered Highway System, US 76 was routed between Chattanooga, Tennessee and Florence, South Carolina. US 17 followed NC 20 west of Wilmington to Chadbourn and then followed NC 202 to the South Carolina state line. In South Carolina, US 17 then continued west to Florence where it met US 76. By 1929, US 17/NC 202 was improved west of Chadbourn, creating an improved road between Wilmington and South Carolina. In 1935, US 17 was rerouted to replace US 117 between Wilmington and Myrtle Beach. The route between Florence and Wilmington was subsequently renumbered as US 76. US 76 also replaced NC 20 between Wilmington and Wrightsville Beach. Both NC 20 and NC 202 were decommissioned in 1934, in favor of overlapping US Highways.

When first established in 1935, US 76 followed its modern-day routing between the South Carolina state line and Chadbourn. At Chadbourn it met US 74 and both highways followed modern-day US 74 Business and US 76 Business through Chadbourn and Whiteville. US 74 and US 76 then followed NC 214 through the towns of Lake Waccamaw and Bolton. East of Bolton, US 76 followed much of its modern-day routing until Leland. In western Leland, the road followed Fletcher Road and Village Road. After Leland School Road, the highway continued straight onto Post Office Road and then made a turn to the southeast along Lincoln Road. The highway then continued to follow Village Road, crossing the Brunswick River south of the modern-day bridge. US 74 and US 76 turned to the north at modern-day US 421, utilizing the Isabel Stellings Holmes Bridge to cross the Northeast Cape Fear River. In Downtown Wilmington US 76 used Third Street, Market Street, and 17th Street until reaching Oleander Street (modern-day Oleander Drive). US 76 followed Oleander Street until Airlie Road, which it followed to Wrightsville Beach. After crossing onto Harbor Island, US 74 and US 76 used Causeway Drive and then followed Lumina Avenue to the north.

In 1936, US 74 and US 76 were adjusted in Leland, using a curve along Village Road to avoid an intersection with Lincoln Road and Post Office Road. The abandoned route, roughly 0.14 miles (230 m) became US 74-A. By 1942, US 76 was removed from its routing along Lumina Avenue north of Causeway Drive in Wrightsville Beach. Instead, the highway was routed south, along Waynick Boulevard, Sunset Avenue, and South Lumina Avenue to end on the south side of Wrightsville Beach. Between 1957 and 1962, US 76 was removed from Airlie Road between Oleander Drive and Wrightsville Avenue. The highway was rerouted north along Oleander Drive to Wrightsville Avenue. It then followed Wrightville Avenue to Wrightsville Beach where the road name changed to Causeway Drive. In 1966, US 76 was placed onto split one-way streets along part of its routing in downtown Wilmington. The westbound lanes continued to use 17th Street between Dawson Street and Market Street, while the eastbound lanes were shifted to use 16th Street and Dawson Street.

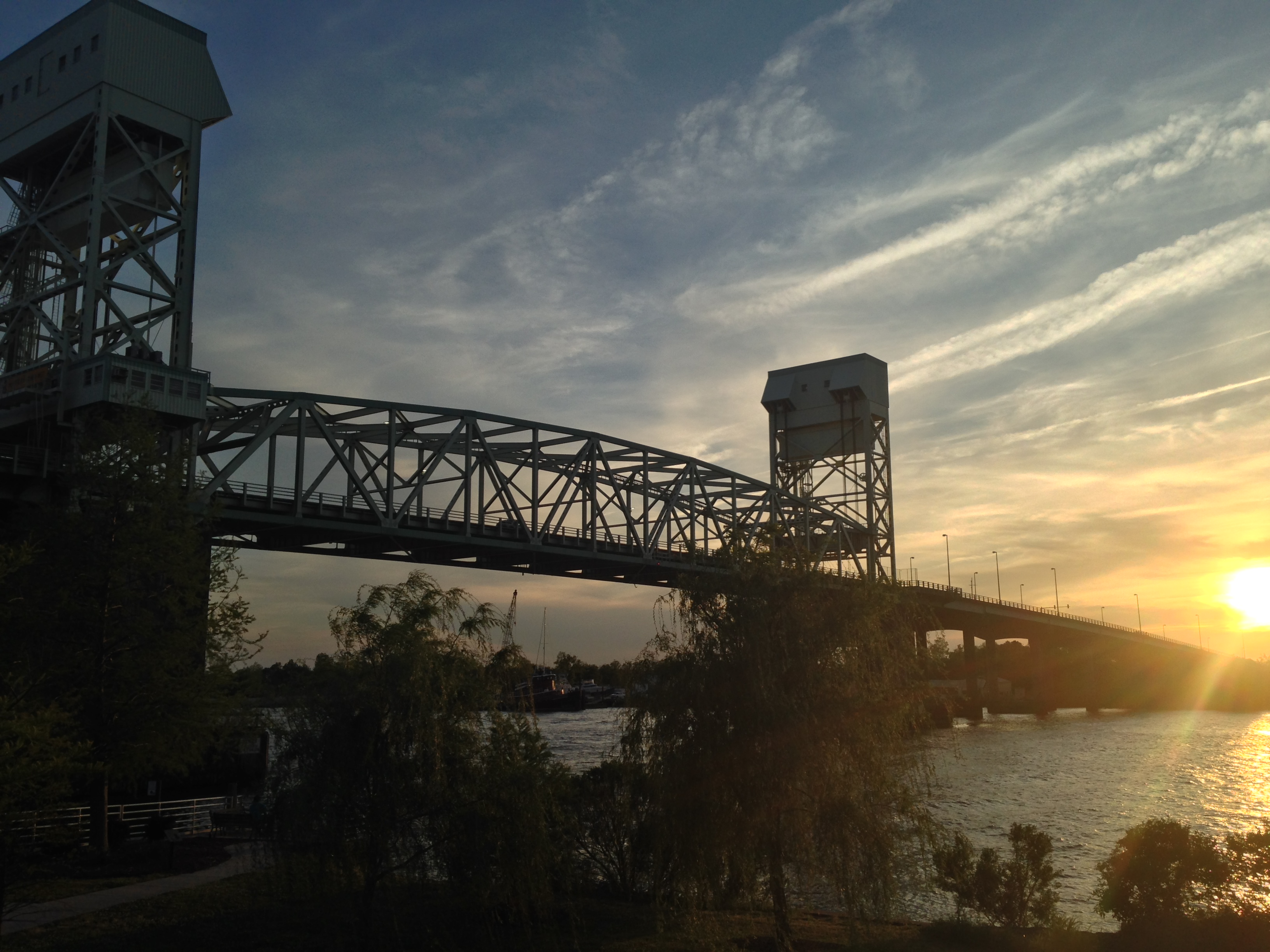
US 76 was rerouted along the newly constructed Cape Fear Memorial Bridge in 1969.

The Cape Fear Memorial Bridge was completed in 1969, providing a second bridge into the city of Wilmington. On September 11, 1969, US 76 was rerouted across the bridge, abandoning its former alignment along US 421 and the Isabel Stellings Holmes Bridge. US 76 was then placed along split one-way streets along Dawson Street and Wooster Street before meeting Oleander Drive. This alignment reflects the modern-day routing of US 76 through downtown Wilmington. In March 1975, US 76 was extended for 0.10 miles (160 m) to the south in Wrightsville Beach. This extension brought the highway to its current eastern terminus. In September 1975, US 76 was placed onto several bypasses west of Wilmington. In Brunswick County, US 76 was placed on a bypass of Leland and Belville from 0.61 miles (980 m) west of Mount Misery Road and Lanvale Road to NC 133. In Columbus County, US 76 was placed on its current routing between US 74 Business and US 76 Business north of Chadbourn and US 74. US 76 was then placed along the US 74 and US 76 freeway until Union Valley Road. Union Valley Road was designated as Temporary US 74 and Temporary US 76 between the freeway and modern-day US 74 Business and US 76 Business. The bypass around Whiteville to US 74 Business and US 76 Business was completed in February 1976. In January 1978, US 17, US 74, US 76, and NC 133 were adjusted along the modern-day freeway from NC 133 across the Brunswick River. The freeway around Whiteville was extended east in October 1986, bypassing the towns of Lake Waccamaw and Hallsboro. The freeway was extended further east, bypassing Bolton in July 1993. The former alignment of US 74 and US 76 became part of NC 214. The final readjustment of US 76 occurred in 2003, when it was removed from Wrightsville Avenue between Oleander Drive and Eastwood Road. US 76 was rerouted to continue north along Military Cutoff Road before heading east along Eastwood Road to Wrightsville Beach.

Since the 1990s, there have been several attempts to convert at least portions of US 76 to an Interstate Highway. In 2003, North Carolina began exploring the possibility of extending Interstate 20 (I-20) from Florence, South Carolina to Wilmington using the US 76 corridor. The extension was proposed to run along a new route between the South Carolina state line and Chadbourn. In Chadbourn, it would have used US 74 and US 76 to Wilmington. The plan has largely been abandoned by the state, and does not appear on the 2015 Strategic Transportation Corridors of North Carolina. A current proposal is to extend I-74 from Lumberton to Myrtle Beach, South Carolina. I-74 is slated to continue along US 74 and US 76 between Chadbourn and Bolton. Consistent with this plan, several upgrades have taken place along this section of highway. A project to convert an at-grade intersection at NC 211 near Bolton to an interchange was completed in 2012. A $9.4 million project to replace an at-grade intersection at Hallsboro Road with an interchange began on August 6, 2018. The diamond interchange was completed on June 12, 2020, extending the US 74 and US 76 freeway to the east.

== Future ==
A feasibility study conducted for the eastward extension of Interstate 74 (I-74) in 2005 found two alternatives for the Interstate. Both alternatives followed US 76 from Chadbourn to an area west of Bolton. West of Bolton, I-74 would split from US 74 and US 76 to turn to the south, roughly following NC 211. Consistent with this plan, the North Carolina Department of Transportation (NCDOT) plans to build a dumbbell interchange at Chaunceytown Road, north of the town of Lake Waccamaw. The project would also include a flyover for Old Lake Road to the east. Once completed, US 76 will be a continuous freeway between US 74 near Chadbourn and Blacksmith Road north of Bolton. The $31.7 million project began construction in 2022. An additional interchange at NC 87 in Maco has been proposed by the Cape Fear Council of Governments. The project is projected to cost $11.7 million and would begin construction in 2027.

NCDOT and the Wilmington Urban Area Metropolitan Planning Organization (WMPO) are currently planning three projects for US 76 in Wilmington. Project U-5710 would construct an interchange to replace the current at-grade intersection between Military Cutoff Road and Eastwood Road in Wilmington. The new interchange would utilize an extended Drysdale Drive and Commonwealth Drive along with several ramps. While US 76 east would utilize a ramp, US 76 west is expected to utilize the extended Drysdale Drive and a portion of Military Cutoff Road north of the intersection. The project began construction in 2023. An additional project (U-5704) would either upgrade the intersection or create an interchange at Oleander Drive and College Road. The project is expected to begin construction in 2030. A third project would improve the intersection between Oleander Drive and Greenville Loop Road/Greenville Avenue. This includes installing dual left-turn lanes at the intersection. Right of way acquisition is expected to begin in 2029.

NCDOT is also proposing two potential bridge replacements along US 76 in New Hanover County. A feasibility study to replace the Cape Fear Memorial Bridge in Wilmington identified four potential replacements. Two proposals involve the construction of a new vertical-lift bridge, while two others detail a fixed-span bridge. One vertical-lift bridge proposal involves including a railroad alongside the highway. NCDOT also completed a draft feasibility study to replace the C. Heide Trask Memorial Bridge in Wrightsville Beach. The study details five options, with three drawbridge configurations and two high-rise bridge configurations. All study options seek to improve the adjacent US 74 and US 76 split in Wrightsville Beach. Four options detail replacing the current design with a roundabout, while one would upgrade the current design. The bridge is expected to reach the end of its design lifespan in 2042.

== Major intersections ==
County	Location	mi	km	Destinations	Notes
Columbus		0.0	0.0	US 76 west – Marion, Florence	Continuation into South Carolina
Columbus	Fair Bluff	2.9	4.7	NC 904 west – Rowland	West end of NC 904 overlap
Columbus	Fair Bluff	3.3	5.3	NC 904 east (Conway Road) – Tabor City	East end of NC 904 overlap
Columbus	Cerro Gordo	9.5	15.3	NC 242 north (Haynes Lennon Highway) – Bladenboro	Southern terminus of NC 242
Columbus	Chadbourn	15.3	24.6	US 74 Bus. east / US 76 Bus. east NC 130 / NC 410 (Joe Brown Highway) – Bladenboro, Tabor City	Western terminus of US 74 Business and US 76 Business
Columbus	Chadbourn	16.5	26.6	US 74 west – Lumberton	West end of US 74 overlap, eastbound exit and westbound entrance
Columbus		19.3	31.1	Union Valley Road – Union Valley	
Columbus	Whiteville	22.2	35.7	US 701 – Whiteville, Clarkton	
Columbus	Whiteville	25.1	40.4	US 74 Bus. west / US 76 Bus. west to NC 214 – Whiteville	Eastern terminus of US 74 Business and US 76 Business
Columbus	Hallsboro	28.7	46.2	Hallsboro Road	
Columbus	Bolton	39.2	63.1	NC 211 – Clarkton, Bolton, Supply	
Columbus	Bolton	42.7	68.7	NC 214 west – Bolton, Lake Waccamaw	Eastern terminus of NC 214
Columbus	Freeman	46.9	75.5	NC 11 north (General Howe Road) – Burgaw	Southern terminus of NC 11
Columbus	Delco	51.3	82.6	NC 87 north (Old Stage Road) – Riegelwood, Elizabethtown	West end of NC 87 overlap
Brunswick	Maco	55.8	89.8	NC 87 south / Northwest Road – Southport, Northwest	East end of NC 87 overlap
Brunswick	Leland	59.7	96.1	I-140 – Jacksonville, Myrtle Beach	Exit 5 (I-140); Partial cloverleaf interchange
Brunswick	Leland	61.0	98.2	Mount Misery Road/Lanvale Road – Leland	Diamond interchange
Brunswick	Leland	64.4	103.6	US 17 south – Shallotte, Myrtle Beach	West end of US 17 overlap; trumpet interchange
Brunswick	Leland	65.5	105.4	NC 133 south – Leland, Belville, Southport, Oak Island	West end of NC 133 overlap; diverging diamond interchange
Brunswick		67.5	108.6	US 74 east / US 421 / NC 133 north – Wrightsville Beach, Jacksonville	Trumpet interchange; east end of US 74 and NC 133 overlaps; west end of US 421 overlap; to USS North Carolina via. USS North Carolina Road
Cape Fear River		67.7	109.0	Cape Fear Memorial Bridge	
New Hanover	Wilmington	68.3	109.9	US 421 Truck south / Front Street – Wilmington	Northern terminus of US 421 Truck; no westbound exit
New Hanover	Wilmington	68.5	110.2	US 421 south / US 17 Bus. north (3rd Street) – Carolina Beach, Kure Beach, Downtown Wilmington	East end of US 421 overlap; western terminus of US 17 Business; to North Carolina Aquarium and Fort Fisher State Park
New Hanover	Wilmington	72.1	116.0	US 117 / NC 132 (College Road) – Carolina Beach, UNC Wilmington	To State Port
New Hanover	Wilmington	76.3	122.8	US 17 north (Military Cutoff Road) / US 74 west (Eastwood Road) – Jacksonville	East end of US 17 and west end of US 74 overlap
New Hanover	Intracoastal Waterway	77.4	124.6	C. Heide Trask Memorial Bridge	
New Hanover	Wrightsville Beach	77.7	125.0	US 74 east (Salisbury Street)	East end of US 74 overlap
New Hanover	Wrightsville Beach	80.4	129.4	Water Street	Eastern terminus; to Coast Guard Station
1.000 mi = 1.609 km; 1.000 km = 0.621 mi: Concurrency terminus; Incomplete access; Unopened

== See also ==
- Special routes of U.S. Route 76

U.S. Route 76
Previous state: South Carolina	North Carolina	Next state: Terminus
