= Cape Fear (region) =

Metropolitan area of Wilmington, North Carolina, US

Coordinates: 34.23°N 77.97°W

Wilmington Metropolitan Area
- Metropolitan Statistical Area
- Wilmington, NC Metropolitan Statistical Area
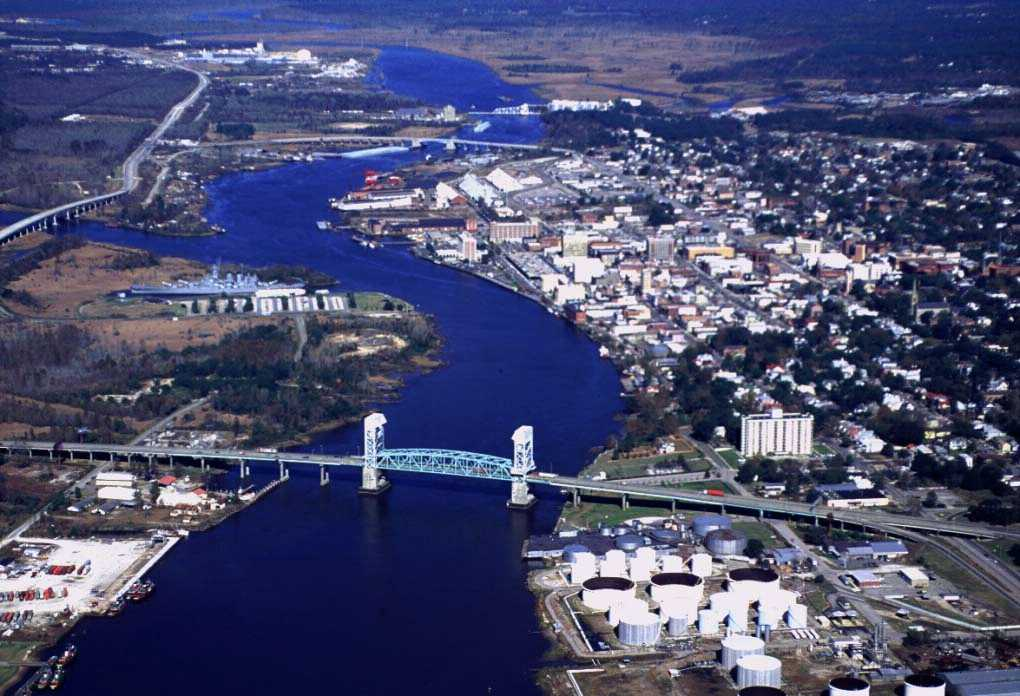
- Wilmington with Cape Fear Memorial Bridge in foreground
Interactive Map of Wilmington, NC MSA
City of Wilmington
Wilmington, NC MSA
- Country: United States
- State: North Carolina
- Largest city: Wilmington

Area
  - Land: 1,914 sq mi (4,957 km^{2})

Population (2022)
  - Total: 453,722

GDP
  - Total: $20.127 billion (2022)
- Time zone: UTC−5 (EST)
  - Summer (DST): UTC−4 (EDT)

Cape Fear is a coastal plain and Tidewater region of North Carolina centered about the city of Wilmington. The region takes its name from the adjacent Cape Fear headland, as does the Cape Fear River which flows through the region and empties into the Atlantic Ocean near the cape. The region's populated areas are mainly found along the Atlantic beaches and the Atlantic Intracoastal Waterway, while the rural areas are dominated by farms and swampland like that of the Green Swamp. The general area can be also identified by the titles "Lower Cape Fear", "Wilmington, NC Metropolitan Statistical Area", "Southeastern North Carolina", and "Azalea Coast". The latter name is derived from the North Carolina Azalea Festival held annually in Wilmington. Municipalities in the area belong to the Cape Fear Council of Governments.

The region is home to the Port of Wilmington, the busiest port in North Carolina, operated by the North Carolina State Ports Authority. It is also the location of Military Ocean Terminal Sunny Point, the largest ammunition port in the nation, and the U.S. Army's primary East Coast deep-water port.

== Geography ==
The Cape Fear region is situated on the Atlantic Coastal Plain. A large portion of the region is low-lying wetlands, most notably the Green Swamp, which is one of the rare habitats of the Venus flytrap. The Cape Fear River and the Northeast Cape Fear River are the deeper prominent rivers that flow through the region, with minor rivers like the Lockwood Folly River, Brunswick River, and Shallotte River providing access for small watercraft of small communities.

== Counties ==
Three counties form the core of the Cape Fear region: Brunswick County, New Hanover County, and Pender County. At the 2020 census, the population of the three counties was 440,353. The coastal counties boast a large, seasonal tourism industry leading to much higher populations in the summer months and lower populations in the winter months.

County	Seat	2025 estimate	2020 Census	Change	Land area	Density
New Hanover	Wilmington	245,959	225,702	+8.98%	192 sq mi (500 km^{2})	1,281/sq mi (495/km^{2})
Brunswick	Bolivia	174,702	136,693	+27.81%	850 sq mi (2,200 km^{2})	206/sq mi (79/km^{2})
Pender	Burgaw	72,111	60,203	+19.78%	871 sq mi (2,260 km^{2})	83/sq mi (32/km^{2})
Total		492,772	422,598	+16.61%	1,913 sq mi (4,950 km^{2})	258/sq mi (99/km^{2})

Two additional counties, Bladen and Columbus, are occasionally included as part of the Cape Fear region. Some broader definitions also include Duplin, Onslow, and Sampson counties.

== Communities ==
Communities found in the Wilmington, North Carolina Metropolitan Statistical Area:

=== Cities ===
- Boiling Spring Lakes
- Northwest
- Southport
- Wilmington (principal city)

=== Towns ===
- Atkinson
- Belville
- Bolivia
- Burgaw
- Calabash
- Carolina Beach
- Carolina Shores
- Caswell Beach
- Holden Beach
- Kure Beach
- Leland
- Navassa
- Oak Island
- Ocean Isle Beach
- Sandy Creek
- Shallotte
- St. Helena
- St. James
- Sunset Beach
- Surf City (partial)
- Topsail Beach
- Varnamtown
- Wallace (partial)
- Watha
- Wrightsville Beach

==== Former towns ====
- Brunswick Town
- Long Beach
- Yaupon Beach

=== Villages ===
- Bald Head Island

=== Census-designated places ===
- Bayshore
- Blue Clay Farms
- Castle Hayne
- Hampstead
- Hightsville
- Kings Grant
- Kirkland
- Masonboro
- Murraysville
- Myrtle Grove
- Northchase
- Ogden
- Porters Neck
- Rocky Point
- Sea Breeze
- Seagate
- Silver Lake
- Skippers Corner
- Wrightsboro

=== Unincorporated places ===
- Ash
- Charity
- Currie
- Figure Eight
- Montague
- Murphey
- Piney Grove
- Register
- Sloop Point
- Supply
- Winnabow
- Yamacraw

== Demographics ==
As of the 2000 United States census, there were 274,532 people, 114,675 households, and 75,347 families residing within the metropolitan statistical area (MSA). The racial makeup of the MSA was 79.47% White, 17.27% African American, 0.48% Native American, 0.58% Asian, 0.05% Pacific Islander, 1.12% from other races, and 1.02% from two or more races. Hispanic or Latino of any race were 2.45% of the population.

The median income for a household in the MSA was $37,321, and the median income for a family was $44,844. Males had a median income of $32,454 versus $22,998 for females. The per capita income for the MSA was $20,287.

== See also ==
- North Carolina statistical areas
- Cape Fear Museum
- Cape Fear Regional Jetport (Howie Franklin Field) formerly known as Brunswick County Airport
- Orton Plantation
- St. Philip's Church, Brunswick Town
