= North Carolina Highway 214 =

State highway in Columbus County, North Carolina, US

North Carolina Highway 214

Route information
- Maintained by NCDOT
- Length: 17.8 mi (28.6 km)
- Existed: 1932–present

Major junctions
- West end: US 74 Bus. / US 76 Bus. near Whiteville
- NC 211 in Bolton
- East end: US 74 / US 76 near Bolton

Location
- Country: United States
- State: North Carolina
- Counties: Columbus

Highway system
- North Carolina Highway System; Interstate; US; State; Scenic
← NC 213	→ NC 215

North Carolina Highway 214 (NC 214) is a primary state highway in the U.S. state of North Carolina; it is entirely in Columbus County.

== Route description ==
NC 214 begins at an intersection with Business U.S. Routes US 74 Business and US 76 Business about 1 1/2 miles (2.4 km) east of Whiteville. The intersection is located just south of exit 244 on US 74/US 76. The two-lane road heads southeast then due east through a rural area until reaching the communities of Hallsboro and Artesia. NC 214 heads north of Lake Waccamaw. Though the road never strays more than 1 mile (1.6 km) from the US 74/US 76 freeway throughout its entire length, the freeway dips south to cross the Friar Swamp/Green Swamp immediately adjacent to the lanes of NC 214. After heading through the town of Bolton where it intersects NC 211, the road briefly widens from a two-lane road to a four-lane divided highway but soon ends at an intersection with US 74/US 76 1 mile (1.6 km) east of the town.

== History ==
In the 1930s, NC 214 was made as a highway through Lake Waccamaw off of US 74 and NC 20. In the 1980s, it was rerouted so that NC 20 was now NC 214, and US 74 was on another highway. However, it was shorter than it is now; it was later extended to the east and west. The original NC 214 is now Lake Shore Drive.

== Junction list ==
The entire route is in Columbus County.

Location	mi	km	Destinations	Notes
	0.0	0.0	US 74 Bus. / US 76 Bus. – Chadbourn, Leland	Western terminus
Bolton	15.5	24.9	NC 211 – Clarkton, Supply	
Bolton	17.8	28.6	US 74 / US 76 – Whiteville, Wilmington	Eastern terminus
1.000 mi = 1.609 km; 1.000 km = 0.621 mi
