= Sandy Creek, North Carolina =

- Town
- Seal

- Location within the state of North Carolina
- Coordinates: 34°16′38″N 78°09′00″W
- Country: United States
- State: North Carolina
- County: Brunswick

Area
  - Total: 1.42 sq mi (3.69 km^{2})
  - Land: 1.42 sq mi (3.69 km^{2})
  - Water: 0 sq mi (0.00 km^{2})
- Elevation: 62 ft (19 m)

Population (2020)
  - Total: 248
  - Density: 173.9/sq mi (67.13/km^{2})
- Time zone: UTC-5 (Eastern (EST))
  - Summer (DST): UTC-4 (EDT)
- ZIP code: 28451
- Area codes: 910, 472
- FIPS code: 37-59090
- GNIS feature ID: 2407284
- Website: www.townofsandycreek.com

Sandy Creek is a town in Brunswick County, North Carolina, United States. As of the 2020 census, Sandy Creek had a population of 248. It is part of the Wilmington, NC Metropolitan Statistical Area.

== Geography ==
Sandy Creek is located in northern Brunswick County. U.S. Routes 74 and 76 (the Andrew Jackson Highway) run along the northern edge of the town and lead 13 miles (21 km) east to Wilmington and 33 miles (53 km) west to Whiteville.

According to the United States Census Bureau, Sandy Creek has a total area of 1.3 square miles (3.3 km^{2}), all land.

== Demographics ==
Historical population
Census	Pop.	Note	%±
1990	243		—
2000	246		1.2%
2010	260		5.7%
2020	248		−4.6%
U.S. Decennial Census

As of the census of 2000, there were 246 people, 91 households, and 64 families residing in the town. The population density was 411.2 inhabitants per square mile (158.8/km^{2}). There were 105 housing units at an average density of 175.5 per square mile (67.8/km^{2}). The racial makeup of the town was 91.87% White, 5.69% African American, 0.81% from other races, and 1.63% from two or more races. Hispanic or Latino of any race were 2.03% of the population.

There were 91 households, out of which 40.7% had children under the age of 18 living with them, 57.1% were married couples living together, 9.9% had a female householder with no husband present, and 28.6% were non-families. 24.2% of all households were made up of individuals, and 8.8% had someone living alone who was 65 years of age or older. The average household size was 2.70 and the average family size was 3.23.

In the town, the population was spread out, with 28.0% under the age of 18, 8.5% from 18 to 24, 31.7% from 25 to 44, 25.2% from 45 to 64, and 6.5% who were 65 years of age or older. The median age was 34 years. For every 100 females, there were 105.0 males. For every 100 females age 18 and over, there were 103.4 males.

The median income for a household in the town was $33,333, and the median income for a family was $40,625. Males had a median income of $27,500 versus $22,813 for females. The per capita income for the town was $14,296. About 9.0% of families and 8.5% of the population were below the poverty line, including 13.9% of those under the age of eighteen and none of those 65 or over.
