= Northwest, North Carolina =

- City
- Seal
- Motto: "Looking to the Future"
- Location within the state of North Carolina
- Coordinates: 34°18′58″N 78°08′41″W
- Country: United States
- State: North Carolina
- County: Brunswick

Area
  - Total: 7.17 sq mi (18.57 km^{2})
  - Land: 7.17 sq mi (18.57 km^{2})
  - Water: 0 sq mi (0.00 km^{2})
- Elevation: 59 ft (18 m)

Population (2020)
  - Total: 703
  - Density: 98.0/sq mi (37.85/km^{2})
- Time zone: UTC-5 (Eastern (EST))
  - Summer (DST): UTC-4 (EDT)
- FIPS code: 37-47860
- GNIS feature ID: 2404401
- Website: www.cityofnorthwest.com

Northwest is a city in Brunswick County, North Carolina, United States. As of the 2020 census, Northwest had a population of 703. It is part of the Wilmington, NC Metropolitan Statistical Area.

== History ==
Northwest was incorporated in 1993.

== Geography ==
Northwest is located near the northernmost point in Brunswick County in North Carolina. U.S. Routes 74 and 76 (Andrew Jackson Highway) pass along the southern border of the community, leading 13 miles (21 km) east to Wilmington and 33 miles (53 km) west to Whiteville.

According to the United States Census Bureau, the city has a total area of 7.0 square miles (18.2 km^{2}), all land.

== Demographics ==
Historical population
Census	Pop.	Note	%±
2000	671		—
2010	735		9.5%
2020	703		−4.4%
2023 (est.)	1,005		43.0%
U.S. Decennial Census

=== Racial and ethnic composition ===
Northwest city, North Carolina – Racial and ethnic composition Note: the US Census treats Hispanic/Latino as an ethnic category. This table excludes Latinos from the racial categories and assigns them to a separate category. Hispanics/Latinos may be of any race.
Race / Ethnicity (NH = Non-Hispanic)	Pop 2000	Pop 2010	Pop 2020	% 2000	% 2010	% 2020
White alone (NH)	178	210	207	26.53%	28.57%	29.45%
Black or African American alone (NH)	482	490	418	71.83%	66.67%	59.46%
Native American or Alaska Native alone (NH)	3	0	5	0.45%	0.00%	0.71%
Asian alone (NH)	2	2	3	0.30%	0.27%	0.43%
Native Hawaiian or Pacific Islander alone (NH)	0	0	0	0.00%	0.00%	0.00%
Other race alone (NH)	1	0	0	0.15%	0.00%	0.00%
Mixed race or Multiracial (NH)	0	9	18	0.00%	1.22%	2.56%
Hispanic or Latino (any race)	5	24	52	0.75%	3.27%	7.40%
Total	671	735	703	100.00%	100.00%	100.00%

=== 2020 census ===
As of the 2020 United States census, there were 703 people, 326 households, and 199 families residing in the city.

=== 2000 census ===
As of the census of 2000, there were 671 people, 260 households, and 185 families residing in the city. The population density was 109.2 inhabitants per square mile (42.2/km^{2}). There were 293 housing units at an average density of 47.7 per square mile (18.4/km^{2}). The racial composition of the city was: 26.83% White, 71.83% Black or African American, 0.75% Hispanic or Latino American, 0.30% Asian American, 0.45% Native American, 0.03% Native Hawaiian or Other Pacific Islander, 0.15% other races, and 0.45% two or more races.

There were 260 households, out of which 32.3% had children under the age of 18 living with them, 48.5% were married couples living together, 18.5% had a female householder with no husband present, and 28.5% were non-families. 24.2% of all households were made up of individuals, and 8.5% had someone living alone who was 65 years of age or older. The average household size was 2.58 and the average family size was 3.07.

In the city, the population was spread out, with 26.7% under the age of 18, 5.5% from 18 to 24, 27.9% from 25 to 44, 27.0% from 45 to 64, and 13.0% who were 65 years of age or older. The median age was 40 years. For every 100 females, there were 79.4 males. For every 100 females age 18 and over, there were 80.9 males.

The median income for a household in the city was $31,250, and the median income for a family was $37,500. Males had a median income of $29,821 versus $19,479 for females. The per capita income for the city was $16,419. About 14.0% of families and 17.6% of the population were below the poverty line, including 21.8% of those under age 18 and 15.6% of those age 65 or over.
