= Skippers Corner, North Carolina =

- CDP
- Location in New Hanover County and the state of North Carolina.
- Coordinates: 34°19′45″N 77°54′51″W
- Country: United States
- State: North Carolina
- County: New Hanover

Area
  - Total: 7.07 sq mi (18.32 km^{2})
  - Land: 7.01 sq mi (18.15 km^{2})
  - Water: 0.066 sq mi (0.17 km^{2})
- Elevation: 26 ft (7.9 m)

Population (2020)
  - Total: 2,912
  - Density: 415.6/sq mi (160.48/km^{2})
- Time zone: UTC-5 (Eastern (EST))
  - Summer (DST): UTC-4 (EDT)
- ZIP code: 28429
- Area codes: 910, 472
- FIPS code: 37-62190
- GNIS feature ID: 2402858

Skippers Corner is a census-designated place (CDP) in New Hanover County, North Carolina, United States. As of the 2020 census, Skippers Corner had a population of 2,912. It is part of the Wilmington Metropolitan Statistical Area.

== Geography ==
According to the United States Census Bureau, the CDP has a total area of 2.4 square miles (6.2 km^{2}), all land.

== Demographics ==
Historical population
Census	Pop.	Note	%±
2000	1,246		—
2010	2,785		123.5%
2020	2,912		4.6%
U.S. Decennial Census

=== 2020 census ===
As of the 2020 census, Skippers Corner had a population of 2,912. The median age was 44.9 years. 18.1% of residents were under the age of 18 and 22.0% of residents were 65 years of age or older. For every 100 females there were 102.8 males, and for every 100 females age 18 and over there were 104.8 males age 18 and over.

79.1% of residents lived in urban areas, while 20.9% lived in rural areas.

There were 1,109 households in Skippers Corner, of which 26.8% had children under the age of 18 living in them. Of all households, 52.8% were married-couple households, 16.7% were households with a male householder and no spouse or partner present, and 25.0% were households with a female householder and no spouse or partner present. About 25.4% of all households were made up of individuals and 8.3% had someone living alone who was 65 years of age or older.

There were 1,249 housing units, of which 11.2% were vacant. The homeowner vacancy rate was 4.5% and the rental vacancy rate was 4.5%.

Racial composition as of the 2020 census
Race	Number	Percent
White	2,044	70.2%
Black or African American	381	13.1%
American Indian and Alaska Native	59	2.0%
Asian	16	0.5%
Native Hawaiian and Other Pacific Islander	0	0.0%
Some other race	229	7.9%
Two or more races	183	6.3%
Hispanic or Latino (of any race)	387	13.3%

=== 2000 census ===
As of the census of 2000, there were 1,246 people, 427 households, and 351 families residing in the CDP. The population density was 512.5 people per square mile (197.9 people/km^{2}). There were 449 housing units at an average density of 184.7 per square mile (71.3/km^{2}). The racial makeup of the CDP was 88.52% White, 8.51% African American, 1.52% Native American, 0.80% from other races, and 0.64% from two or more races. Hispanic or Latino of any race were 4.82% of the population.

There were 427 households, out of which 41.0% had children under the age of 18 living with them, 70.5% were married couples living together, 8.2% had a female householder with no husband present, and 17.6% were non-families. 13.1% of all households were made up of individuals, and 4.2% had someone living alone who was 65 years of age or older. The average household size was 2.75 and the average family size was 3.01.

In the CDP, the population was spread out, with 23.4% under the age of 18, 9.6% from 18 to 24, 28.7% from 25 to 44, 28.3% from 45 to 64, and 10.0% who were 65 years of age or older. The median age was 39 years. For every 100 females, there were 100.3 males. For every 100 females age 18 and over, there were 96.7 males.

The median income for a household in the CDP was $40,938, and the median income for a family was $44,063. Males had a median income of $34,688 versus $21,722 for females. The per capita income for the CDP was $22,533. About 8.5% of families and 13.1% of the population were below the poverty line, including 13.6% of those under age 18 and 38.2% of those age 65 or over.
