= Belville, North Carolina =

- Town
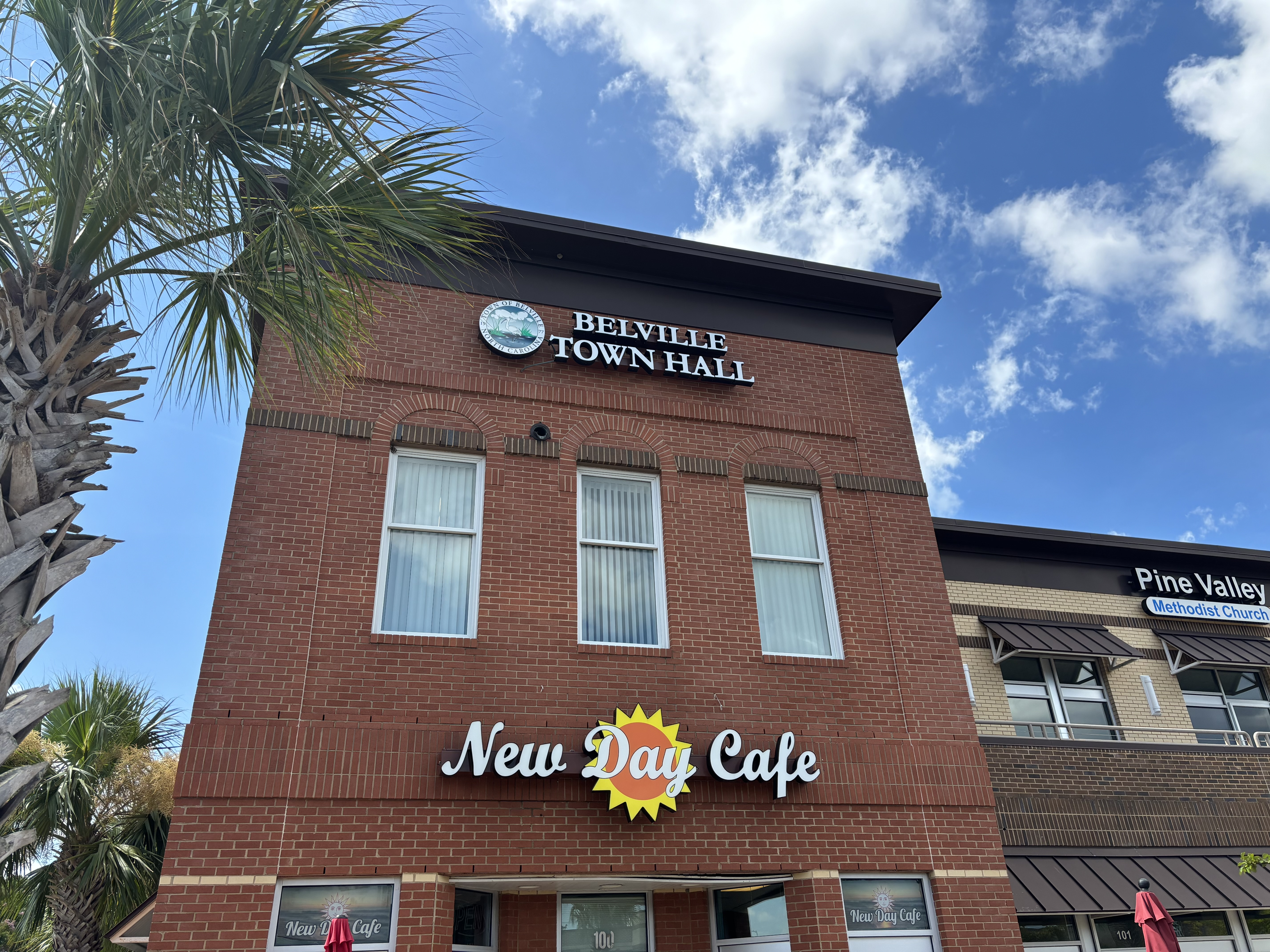
- Belville Town Hall

- Seal

- Location within the state of North Carolina
- Coordinates: 34°13′08″N 77°59′51″W
- Country: United States
- State: North Carolina
- County: Brunswick
- Incorporated: 1977

Area
  - Total: 1.99 sq mi (5.15 km^{2})
  - Land: 1.70 sq mi (4.41 km^{2})
  - Water: 0.28 sq mi (0.73 km^{2})
- Elevation: 20 ft (6.1 m)

Population (2020)
  - Total: 2,406
  - Density: 1,411.6/sq mi (545.03/km^{2})
- Time zone: UTC-5 (Eastern (EST))
  - Summer (DST): UTC-4 (EDT)
- ZIP code: 28451
- Area codes: 910, 472
- FIPS code: 37-04950
- GNIS feature ID: 2405238
- Website: www.townofbelville.com

Belville is a town in Brunswick County, North Carolina, United States. The population was 2,406 at the 2020 census. It is part of the Wilmington, NC metropolitan area.

== History ==
Belville was incorporated as a town in 1977.

== Geography ==
Belville is located in northeastern Brunswick County directly across the Brunswick River and Cape Fear River from downtown Wilmington. According to the United States Census Bureau, the town has a total area of 1.9 square miles (4.8 km^{2}), of which 1.7 square miles (4.3 km^{2}) is land and 0.19 square miles (0.5 km^{2}) (10.45%) is water.

== Demographics ==
Historical population
Census	Pop.	Note	%±
1980	102		—
1990	66		−35.3%
2000	285		331.8%
2010	1,936		579.3%
2020	2,406		24.3%
U.S. Decennial Census

=== 2020 census ===
As of the 2020 census, there were 2,406 people residing in the town, including 651 families.

The median age was 38.9 years. 21.9% of residents were under the age of 18 and 14.3% of residents were 65 years of age or older. For every 100 females there were 95.9 males, and for every 100 females age 18 and over there were 90.7 males age 18 and over.

100.0% of residents lived in urban areas, while 0.0% lived in rural areas.

There were 963 households in Belville, of which 30.3% had children under the age of 18 living in them. Of all households, 49.6% were married-couple households, 16.0% were households with a male householder and no spouse or partner present, and 26.6% were households with a female householder and no spouse or partner present. About 24.8% of all households were made up of individuals and 8.3% had someone living alone who was 65 years of age or older.

There were 1,014 housing units, of which 5.0% were vacant. The homeowner vacancy rate was 0.9% and the rental vacancy rate was 5.1%.

Belville racial composition
Race	Number	Percentage
White (non-Hispanic)	1,756	72.98%
Black or African American (non-Hispanic)	338	14.05%
Native American	14	0.58%
Asian	13	0.54%
Pacific Islander	7	0.29%
Other/Mixed	130	5.4%
Hispanic or Latino	148	6.15%

=== 2000 census ===
As of the census of 2000, there were 285 people, 108 households, and 84 families residing in the town. The population density was 70.6 inhabitants per square mile (27.3/km^{2}). There were 142 housing units at an average density of 35.2 per square mile (13.6/km^{2}). The racial makeup of the town was 81.75% White, 14.39% African American, 1.75% Pacific Islander, and 2.11% from two or more races. Hispanic or Latino of any race were 2.81% of the population.

There were 108 households, out of which 42.6% had children under the age of 18 living with them, 62.0% were married couples living together, 11.1% had a female householder with no husband present, and 22.2% were non-families. 17.6% of all households were made up of individuals, and 4.6% had someone living alone who was 65 years of age or older. The average household size was 2.64 and the average family size was 2.95.

In the town, the population was spread out, with 28.4% under the age of 18, 11.9% from 18 to 24, 40.7% from 25 to 44, 13.7% from 45 to 64, and 5.3% who were 65 years of age or older. The median age was 27 years. For every 100 females, there were 95.2 males. For every 100 females age 18 and over, there were 100.0 males.

The median income for a household in the town was $55,536, and the median income for a family was $56,250. Males had a median income of $29,167 versus $23,929 for females. The per capita income for the town was $22,482. About 7.4% of families and 14.5% of the population were below the poverty line, including 28.1% of those under the age of eighteen and 7.4% of those 65 or over.

== Infrastructure and transport ==
U.S. Routes 17, 74 and 76, traveling concurrently as the Andrew Jackson Highway/Ocean Highway, form the northern edge of the town and cross the rivers from there into Wilmington. The town lacks the presence of Interstate highways, though Interstate 140 loops around Belville and its surrounding communities to the north and west, and is accessible via the Andrew Jackson and Ocean Highways.

The town is served with public transport by Coastal Area Transit System, or CATS. Wilmington's airport, Wilmington International Airport, is the primary air gateway to Belville.
