= Bolton, North Carolina =

- Town
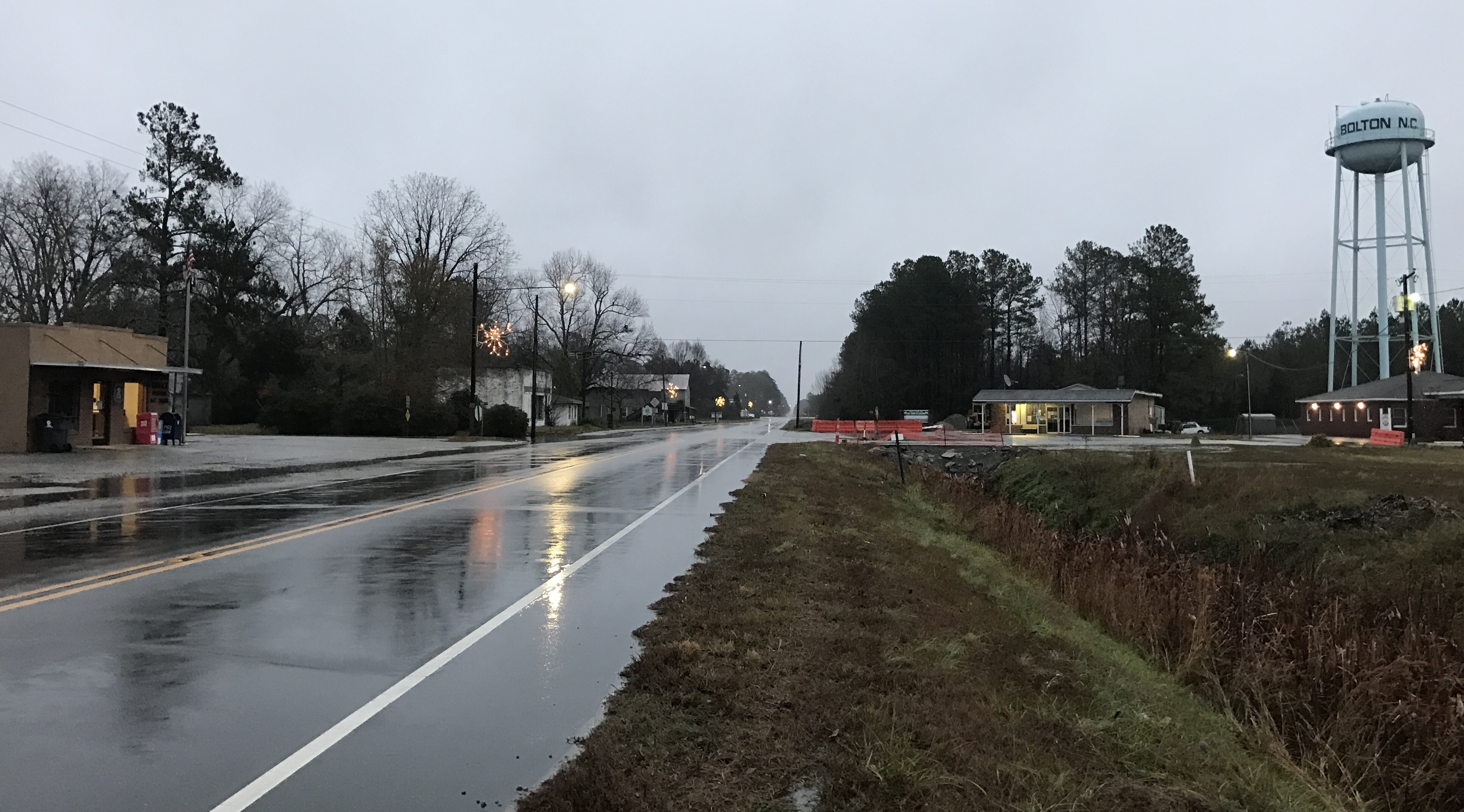
- North Carolina Highway 214 (Sam Potts Highway)

- Seal

- Location within the state of North Carolina
- Coordinates: 34°19′03″N 78°23′51″W
- Country: United States
- State: North Carolina
- County: Columbus

Government
  - Mayor: Shawn Maynor

Area
  - Total: 3.60 sq mi (9.33 km^{2})
  - Land: 3.60 sq mi (9.33 km^{2})
  - Water: 0 sq mi (0.00 km^{2})
- Elevation: 59 ft (18 m)

Population (2020)
  - Total: 519
  - Density: 144.1/sq mi (55.63/km^{2})
- Time zone: UTC-5 (Eastern (EST))
  - Summer (DST): UTC-4 (EDT)
- ZIP code: 28423
- Area codes: 910, 472
- FIPS code: 37-06860
- GNIS feature ID: 2405300
- Website: townofboltonnc.com

Bolton is a town in Columbus County, North Carolina, United States. The population was 519 at the 2020 census.

== History ==
Bolton was established in 1899 and named for the Bolton Lumber Company. It became an incorporated community in 1915.

In 1981 undercover agents of the U.S. Federal Bureau of Investigation were investigating corruption in Columbus County as part of the Colcor investigation. As part of their inquiry into election fraud, the agents pretended to be interest in opening a bar in Bolton. They pushed for a referendum to legalize liquor-by-the-drink in the town and paid local politician Herbert Riggins to buy votes in their favor, the first time the FBI had ever attempted to manipulate a public election. The referendum was held on April 30, 1982, with a majority of local residents in favor of legalizing liquor-by-the-drink, though Riggins mostly avoided involving himself in the vote. The North Carolina State Board of Elections later nullified the referendum.

The Colcor affair was followed by a series of other scandals which embroiled the town, beginning with the shooting of the town's first black mayor in 1990 by a white State Highway Patrolman. Civil rights groups responded by launching the "Bolton Movement", a series of protests across the county, which led to the Ku Klux Klan hosting counterprotests in the town. A few years later the mayor and an alderman pled no contest to charges of mismanaging the town's finances. In 2002 the Bolton police chief was placed on administrative leave after allegedly attacking a couple in the town hall who were complaining about police brutality.

== Geography ==
Bolton is located in eastern Columbus County. The town is bypassed to the north by combined U.S. Routes 74 and 76, a four-lane divided highway. US 74/76 leads east 28 miles (45 km) to Wilmington and west 18 miles (29 km) to Whiteville, the Columbus County seat.

According to the United States Census Bureau, the town has a total area of 3.7 square miles (9.7 km^{2}), all land.

== Demographics ==
Historical population
Census	Pop.	Note	%±
1920	699		—
1930	976		39.6%
1940	760		−22.1%
1950	606		−20.3%
1960	617		1.8%
1970	534		−13.5%
1980	563		5.4%
1990	531		−5.7%
2000	494		−7.0%
2010	691		39.9%
2020	519		−24.9%
U.S. Decennial Census

=== Racial and ethnic composition ===
Bolton town, North Carolina – Racial and ethnic composition Note: the US Census treats Hispanic/Latino as an ethnic category. This table excludes Latinos from the racial categories and assigns them to a separate category. Hispanics/Latinos may be of any race.
Race / Ethnicity (NH = Non-Hispanic)	Pop 2000	Pop 2010	Pop 2020	% 2000	% 2010	% 2020
White alone (NH)	156	159	124	31.58%	23.01%	23.89%
Black or African American alone (NH)	314	473	297	63.56%	68.45%	57.23%
Native American or Alaska Native alone (NH)	12	21	35	2.43%	3.04%	6.74%
Asian alone (NH)	1	0	4	0.20%	0.00%	0.77%
Native Hawaiian or Pacific Islander alone (NH)	0	0	0	0.00%	0.00%	0.00%
Other race alone (NH)	0	2	1	0.00%	0.29%	0.19%
Mixed race or Multiracial (NH)	5	16	30	1.01%	2.32%	5.78%
Hispanic or Latino (any race)	6	20	28	1.21%	2.89%	5.39%
Total	494	691	519	100.00%	100.00%	100.00%

=== 2020 census ===
As of the 2020 United States census, there were 519 people, 254 households, and 160 families residing in the town.

=== 2000 census ===
As of the census of 2000, there were 494 people, 198 households, and 138 families residing in the town. The population density was 159.3 inhabitants per square mile (61.5/km^{2}). There were 219 housing units at an average density of 70.6 per square mile (27.3/km^{2}). The racial makeup of the town was 31.58% White, 63.77% African American, 2.63% Native American, 0.20% Asian, 0.81% from other races, and 1.01% from two or more races. Hispanic or Latino of any race were 1.21% of the population.

There were 198 households, out of which 25.8% had children under the age of 18 living with them, 42.4% were married couples living together, 20.7% had a female householder with no husband present, and 30.3% were non-families. 27.3% of all households were made up of individuals, and 12.6% had someone living alone who was 65 years of age or older. The average household size was 2.49 and the average family size was 2.97.

In the town, the population was spread out, with 25.5% under the age of 18, 10.5% from 18 to 24, 23.9% from 25 to 44, 24.1% from 45 to 64, and 16.0% who were 65 years of age or older. The median age was 38 years. For every 100 females, there were 90.7 males. For every 100 females age 18 and over, there were 89.7 males.

The median income for a household in the town was $27,596, and the median income for a family was $33,295. Males had a median income of $33,750 versus $21,071 for females. The per capita income for the town was $12,400. About 16.6% of families and 22.0% of the population were below the poverty line, including 26.5% of those under age 18 and 38.8% of those age 65 or over.
