= Leland, North Carolina =

- Town
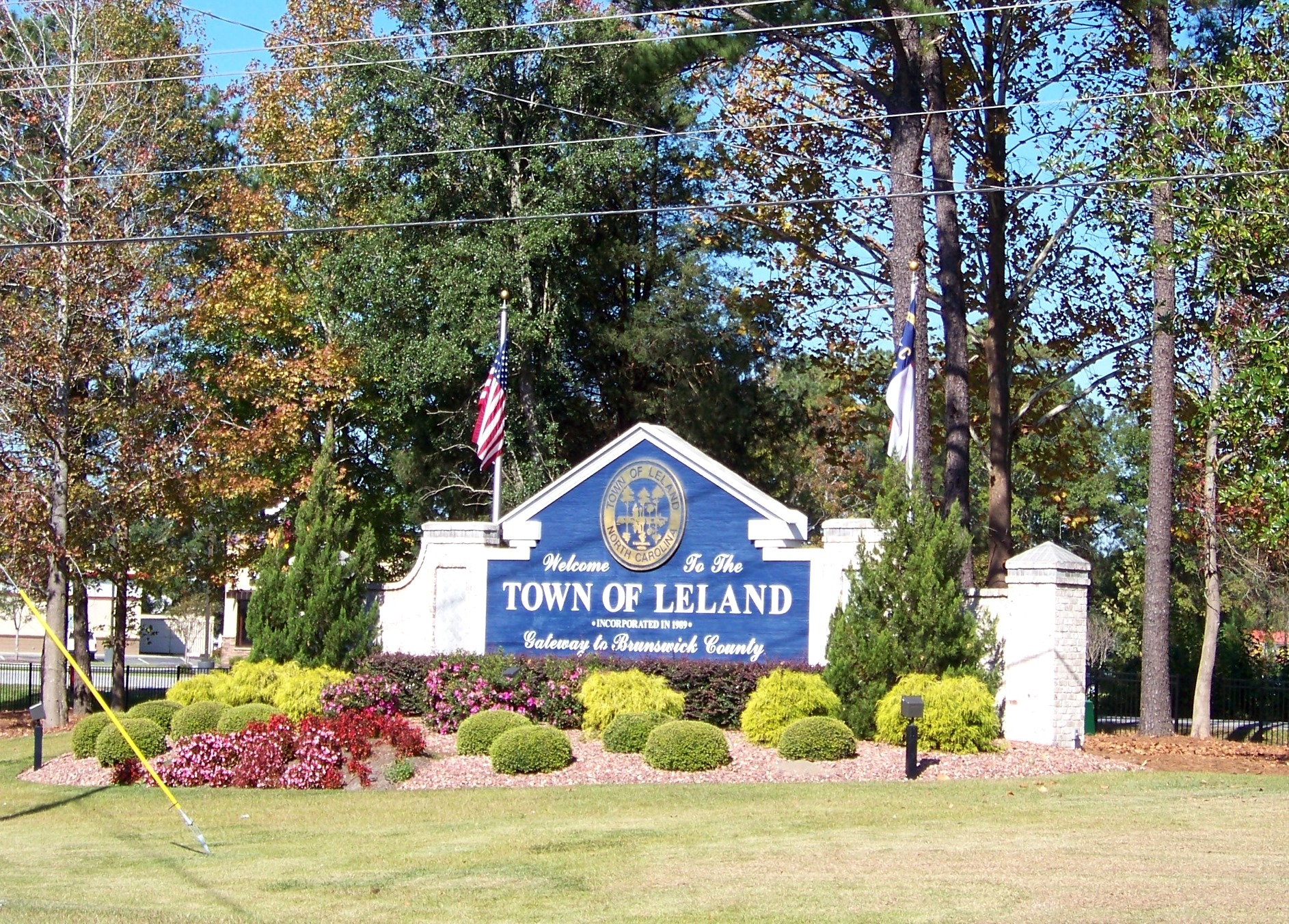
- Town of Leland welcome sign

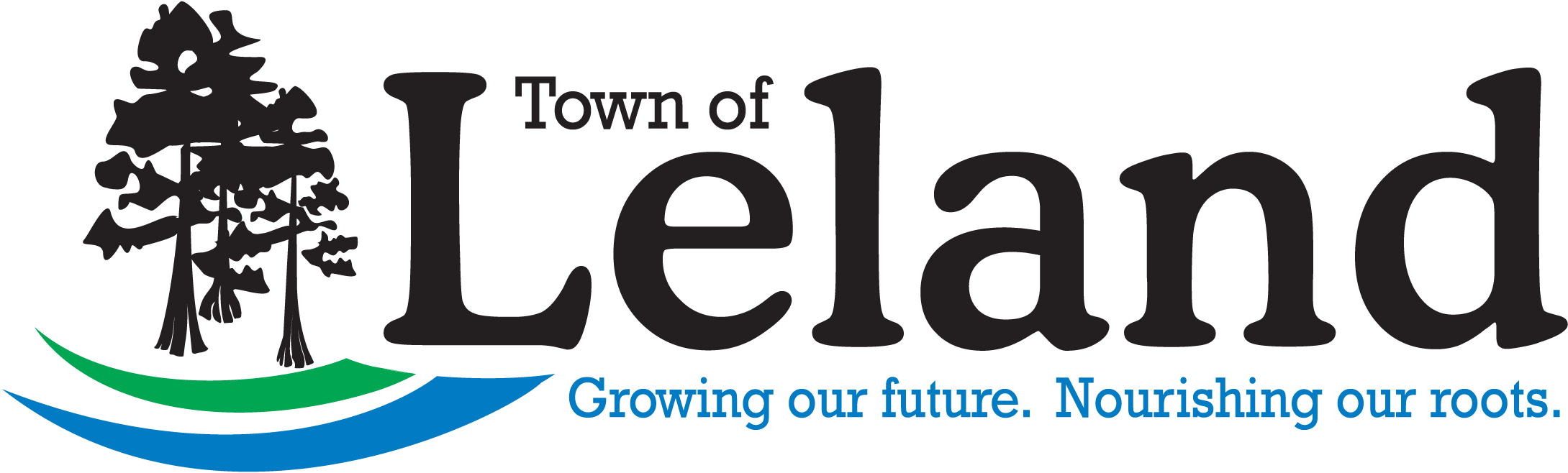
- Flag Seal Logo
- Nickname: L.A.
- Motto: "Growing our future. Nourishing our roots."
- Location in North Carolina
- Coordinates: 34°12′17″N 77°59′28″W
- Country: United States
- State: North Carolina
- County: Brunswick
- Township: Town Creek
- Settled: February 10, 1898
- Incorporated: September 5, 1989
- Named for: Leland Adams

Government
  - Type: Council–manager
  - Mayor: Brenda Bozeman
  - Mayor Pro Tem: Bob Campbell
  - Town Council: Members: Veronica Carter; Richard Holloman; Bill McHugh

Area
  - Total: 22.68 sq mi (58.73 km^{2})
  - Land: 22.33 sq mi (57.83 km^{2})
  - Water: 0.35 sq mi (0.90 km^{2})
- Elevation: 26 ft (7.9 m)

Population (2020)
  - Total: 22,908
  - Estimate (2023): 30,542 ▲
  - Density: 1,026/sq mi (396.1/km^{2})
- Time zone: UTC−5 (Eastern (EST))
  - Summer (DST): UTC−4 (EDT)
- ZIP Code: 28451
- Area codes: 910 and 472
- FIPS code: 37-37680
- GNIS feature ID: 2406002
- U.S. Routes: ,,
- Waterways: Brunswick River, Alligator Creek, Mallory Creek, Jackeys Creek, Sturgeon Creek, Piney Branch, Morgan Branch, and Bishop Branch
- Website: townofleland.com

Leland is the most populous town in Brunswick County, North Carolina, United States. The population was 23,504 at the 2020 census, up from 13,527 in 2010. As of 2020, it is considered to be one of the fastest growing towns in North Carolina. It is part of the Wilmington, NC Metropolitan Statistical Area. and the Cape Fear Council of Governments. The town of Leland is in the northeastern part of Brunswick County, with the town of Navassa to the north, Belville to east, and Boiling Spring Lakes to the south. It is part of the Town Creek township, and Cape Fear region of North Carolina, a short distance north of the South Carolina state line. Leland is located five miles (8.0 km) west of Wilmington, 71 miles (114 km) north of Myrtle Beach, 84 miles (135 km) southeast of Fayetteville, and 135 miles (217 km) southeast of Raleigh.

== History ==
=== Settlement ===
What is today known as Leland was once a small settlement built upon where Village Road crossed the Augusta, Columbia and Wilmington railroad lines. The town is named after (Joseph W. Gay) the first postmaster's nephew, Leland Adams. Leland benefited greatly from its proximity to the Brunswick River, allowing it to serve as an early transportation center, giving travelers the ability to traverse the Brunswick and Cape Fear rivers.

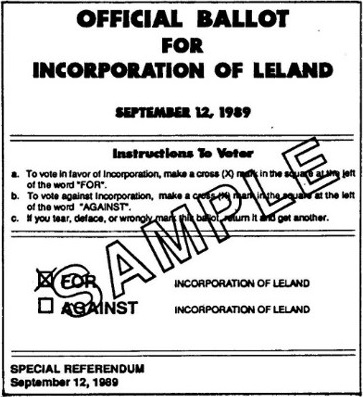
Sample ballot of the vote for Leland to incorporate.

=== Incorporation ===
The citizens of Leland voted down an attempt at incorporation in 1979. Leland was ultimately incorporated as a town on September 5, 1989, in a passing vote of 472–42. After the ordinance passed to incorporate the town of Leland, Leland was governed by twelve members of the Leland Town Charter Commission until Election Day of 1989. Leland has been governed by a mayor-council government since its first general election.

=== Dispute with Belville ===
In March and April 1989, Belville made unsuccessful attempts to annex the area known as Leland. This, in turn resulted in the Leland civic association making proactive attempts to incorporate to avoid annexation. Belville's commissioners voted to annex a business district roughly an hour before Leland had finalized the vote to incorporate. Leland's first mayor, Russell Baldwin, when questioned about the matter, stated: "It was kind of a dirty trick. They made a mockery of the annexation laws."

=== Merger attempts ===
In 2012, according to Jack Batson, the mayor of Belville at the time, "It's something that's always on people's minds because you see the way the maps are laid out. It makes sense." Belville is effectively an enclave township surrounded by Leland's borders to the left and the Brunswick River to the right. In April 1996, during Leland mayor Franky Thomas' tenure, an unsuccessful attempt was made to merge the Leland sanitary district, Leland, Belville, and Navassa into one large town. In 2000, Leland made an unsuccessful attempt to merge with Navassa, Belville, and the North Brunswick sanitary district. Another attempt was made in 2012 to merge with Belville. Leland officials attempted to entice Belville officials, citing the town's contract issues with Urban Smart Growth that Belville had entered into years before to develop its downtown. If Leland and Belville were to merge, Belville would have the funds to buy out the contract, or fight it out in court. Jack Batson, the mayor of Belville at the time, faced heavy criticism for discussing the subject matter with Leland officials. One Belville resident stated; "When I voted for Mr. Batson, I thought I was voting for the position of mayor, not God."

== Geography ==
Leland is located in northern Brunswick County to the west of the Brunswick River and directly west of downtown Wilmington. Leland surrounds the town of Belville on three sides (to the north, west, and south).

According to the United States Census Bureau, the town has a total area of 22.68 square miles (58.74 km^{2}), of which 22.33 square miles (57.83 km^{2}) is land and 0.35 square miles (0.91 km^{2}) is water.

=== Green space ===
Leland has three officially designated parks: Founders Park, Cypress Cove Park, and Westgate Park. Founders Park, formerly known as Municipal Park, is Leland's first park. The eight-acre park includes such features as a playground, gazebo, stage, picnic tables, benches, open green spaces, and a 0.6-mile paved multi-use path. Cypress Cove park, previously known as Sturgeon Creek Park, was donated by Mr. Kirby Sullivan to the town of Leland in 2005. Cypress Cove Park is made up of 27 acres of wetlands and 1.2 acres of uplands. Cypress Cove Park is the first water access site for Leland, and features a fixed overlook deck, outdoor classroom, a floating dock, and handicap accessible fishing area. Westgate Nature Park consists of approximately 150 acres of wetlands and uplands. Construction of the park was funded by a $500,000 grant provided by the North Carolina Parks and Recreation Trust Fund.

In November 2025, Leland announced progress on the creation of its first-ever nature preserve. The Town owns approximately 1,000 acres near the intersection of Highway 87 and Colon Mintz Road within an area rich in natural and cultural heritage, featuring forested wetlands and upland pine habitats, and is home to diverse plant and wildlife species. The land is planned to remain in its natural state in the short-term and will be improved over time to include hiking trails, wildlife observation opportunities, and environmental education programs.

== Demographics ==
Historical population
Census	Pop.	Note	%±
1990	1,801		—
2000	1,938		7.6%
2010	13,527		598.0%
2020	22,908		69.4%
2025 (est.)	35,731	▲	56.0%
U.S. Decennial Census; 2020 Census

=== 2020 census ===
As of the 2020 census, Leland had a population of 22,908. The median age was 50.7 years. 17.0% of residents were under the age of 18, and 31.1% were 65 years of age or older. For every 100 females, there were 91.4 males, and for every 100 females age 18 and over, there were 87.9 males age 18 and over.

96.8% of residents lived in urban areas, while 3.2% lived in rural areas.

There were 10,116 households in Leland, including 7,117 families. Of all households, 21.8% had children under the age of 18 living in them. Married-couple households made up 58.9% of households, while 11.1% had a male householder with no spouse or partner present and 23.4% had a female householder with no spouse or partner present. About 23.4% of households were made up of individuals, and 11.5% had someone living alone who was 65 years of age or older.

There were 10,905 housing units, of which 7.2% were vacant. The homeowner vacancy rate was 2.0%, and the rental vacancy rate was 10.1%.

Leland racial composition
Race	Number	Percentage
White (non-Hispanic)	18,250	79.67%
Black or African American (non-Hispanic)	1,887	8.24%
Native American	98	0.43%
Asian	314	1.37%
Pacific Islander	6	0.03%
Other/Mixed	1,014	4.43%
Hispanic or Latino	1,339	5.85%

=== 2000 census ===
As of the 2000 census there were 1,938 people, 781 households, and 549 families living in the town. The population density was 483.8 inhabitants per square mile (186.8/km^{2}). There were 871 housing units at an average density of 229.4 per square mile (88.6/km^{2}). The racial makeup of the town was 77.71% White, 16.20% African American, 1.24% Native American, 0.21% Asian, 2.53% from other races, and 2.12% from two or more races. Hispanic or Latino of any race were 4.44%.

Of the 781 households 30.3% had children under the age of 18 living with them, 52.6% were married couples living together, 12.3% had a female householder with no husband present, and 29.7% were non-families. 22.3% of households were one person and 7.4% were one person aged 65 or older. The average household size was 2.48 and the average family size was 2.85. The age distribution was 24.6% under the age of 18, 8.5% from 18 to 24, 31.2% from 25 to 44, 25.1% from 45 to 64, and 10.6% 65 or older. The median age was 36 years. For every 100 females, there were 103.8 males. For every 100 females age 18 and over, there were 98.8 males.

The median household income was $32,574 and the median family income was $38,077. Males had a median income of $27,379 versus $22,961 for females. The per capita income for the town was $18,462. About 15.1% of families and 18.8% of the population were below the poverty line, including 28.2% of those under age 18 and 11.6% of those age 65 or over.

== Education ==
As of the year 2024, 96% of the Leland citizens older than twenty-five had a high school degree, and 39% of the Leland citizens older than twenty-five possessed a bachelor's degree.

=== Public schools ===
There are four public schools located within the Leland township: Belville Elementary, Lincoln Elementary, Leland Middle School, and North Brunswick High School. The four schools operate under the Brunswick County Schools system.

=== Charter schools ===
Leland has one charter school, a public charter school; Charter Day School that serves grades kindergarten through eight. Charter Day School garnered national attention in 2016 when the school was sued in the eastern district of North Carolina southern division by the ACLU and the ACLU of North Carolina; the law firm of Ellis & Winters LLP filed the challenge on Leland students. regarding the Charter school's dress code. The Charter Day School's uniform policy required female students to wear skirts, the only exception being gym class, which Charter Day's founder stated promoted chivalry, mutual respect, and traditional values. U.S. District Judge Malcolm Howard ruled that the charter schools uniform policy engaged in unconstitutional sexual discrimination, citing the equal protection clause of the constitution, by prohibiting females from wearing pants or shorts, instead mandating skirts. A federal appeals court, on August 2, 2021, tossed out Judge Howard's decision, and ordered the lower district court to review the decision and to determine whether dress code is a violation of Title IX.

== Government and politics ==
The town of Leland resides within the thirteenth North Carolina district court, the fifteenth North Carolina prosecutorial district, 13B North Carolina Superior Court district, and the second North Carolina superior court division. The town of Leland's governing body is a town council and Mayor. The town council is composed of four members who serve four-year terms, that are staggered. The Mayor is restricted to the same voting rights, privileges and limitations as the town council members.

== Infrastructure ==
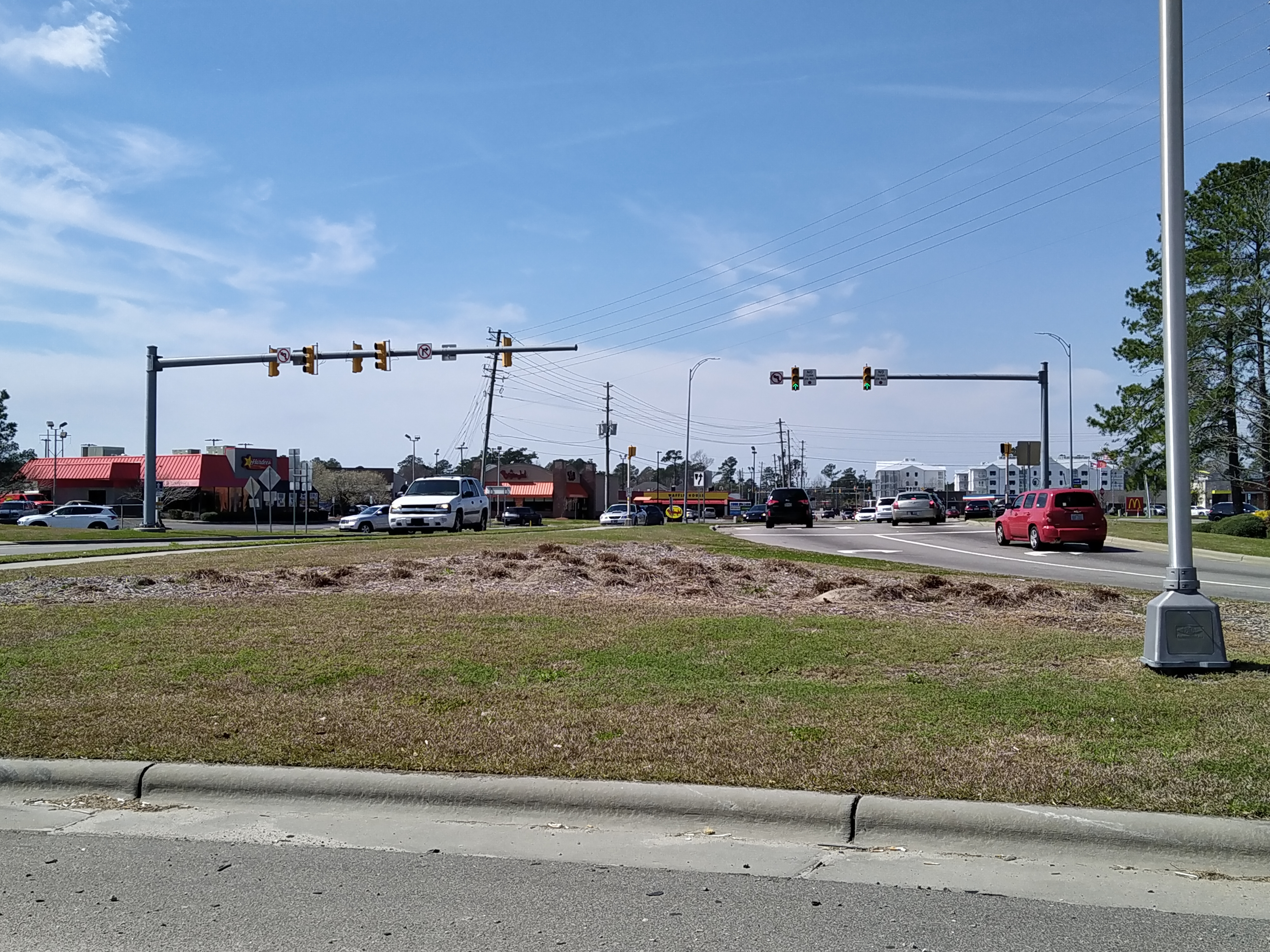
Commercial area along Village Road, looking north from North Carolina Highway 133.

=== Town services ===
==== Police department ====
As of 2020, the Leland Police Department had 30 trained officers. The Leland Police force is partitioned into six subdivisions: the board administrations, network and bolster administrations, key and strategic administrations, examinations, watch, and hold.

The Leland police department offers its citizens the use of a service called CrimeMapping, a product of TriTech Software Systems. CrimeMapping is an online interactive tool that allows users to access and analyze reports for the entire town limits, or the option to isolate their search to a certain block, street or neighborhood. Jeremy Humphries, Captain of Support Services for the Leland Police Department, said: "It gives them [Leland citizens] the ability to see what is going on within their neighborhoods and communities without ... requesting reports."

==== Fire/rescue department ====
The department was established in 1959 as non-profit volunteer organization. In 2017 the Fire/Rescue Department was incorporated as a part of the township of Leland. The fire department also responds to emergency calls regarding motor vehicle accidents, and rescue calls. It has over 40 paid career staff and a roster of part-time and volunteer employees. The department has one station at 1004 Village Road, a station located at 1379 River Road.

==== Emergency medical services ====
Brunswick County Emergency Services also provides emergency medical services to Leland and operates two paramedic level ambulances stationed in the Leland Industrial Park. The next closest ambulance is located in Town Creek Township located in Winnabow.

==== Emergency alert system ====
Leland offers its residents the ability to use a voluntary service called CodeRED. CodeRED is a free high-speed emergency mass notification system provided by OnSolve, LLC. At the date of its launch the town's emergency management directory John Grimes was quoted by WECT stating: "CodeRED’s system will provide Town staff with a reliable, easy-to-use interface to quickly deliver critical information to our residents during emergencies"

==== Trash and recycling ====
Leland does not have its own municipal waste system; instead, trash service is provided by Brunswick County through GFL Environmental, Inc. The town of Leland did once offer a curbside recycling service to its citizens; the service which was done through GFL environmental Inc., expired on June 30, 2021. Prior to cancellation of service, Leland transitioned its curbside recycling program to once a month, instead of twice, on July 1, 2020. According to town officials, the deciding factor was the dramatic increase in costs associated with the recycling program. In the fiscal year 2016–17, the town spent $390,000 on the recycling program, while the town was projected to spend $723,389 in the 2021–22 fiscal year, a potential 85% increase.
