= Cape Fear Memorial Bridge =

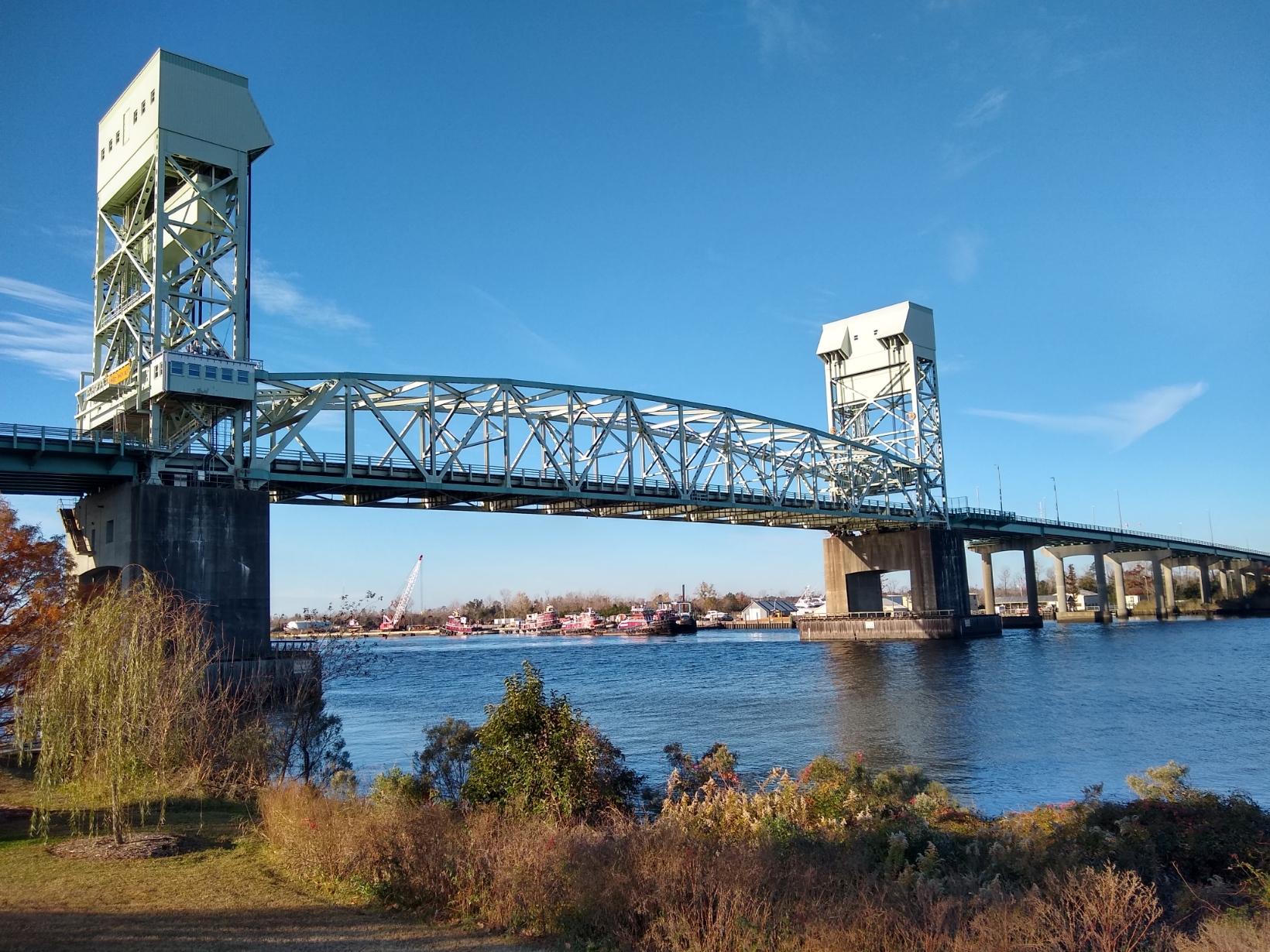
- Coordinates: 34.2280°N 77.9521°W
- Carries: US 17 / US 76 / US 421
- Crosses: Cape Fear River
- Locale: Wilmington, North Carolina
- Official name: Cape Fear Memorial Bridge
- Maintained by: North Carolina Department of Transportation

Characteristics
- Design: Vertical lift bridge
- Total length: 924.5 m (3,033 ft)
- Width: 16.5 m (54 ft) (4 lanes)
- Longest span: 408 feet (124 m)
- Load limit: 46.8 tonnes
- Clearance below: 21 m (69 ft)

History
- Opened: October 1, 1969; 56 years ago

Location
- Interactive map of Cape Fear Memorial Bridge

The Cape Fear Memorial Bridge is a steel vertical-lift bridge in North Carolina. It carries US 17/US 76/US 421 across the Cape Fear River between Brunswick County and New Hanover County. It also carried U.S. Route 74 until that designation was shifted to the Isabel Stellings Holmes Bridge. It has a lift span that can be raised 135 feet (41 m). The lift span is 408 feet (124 m) long.

== History ==
Construction on the bridge began in 1967 and was completed in 1969. The new bridge included a causeway at both ends and an overpass at the west side of the bridge. Since it opened, it has been the only connection on the south side of downtown Wilmington. A ferry system originally operated from the foot of Market Street to Peter Point. The design of the bridge is a two tower structure with a lift span that is 60 feet above the river, and can be raised to 135 feet to accommodate passing ships. The Port of Wilmington is to the south and downtown Wilmington is north of the bridge.

The bridge received new paint in 1986, new decking in 1996 and a new control system in 2007. after the Minneapolis bridge incident, all the cross beams were replaced and another paint job was conducted in 2011, and ended in 2012 after multiple delays. After decades of use, proposals have been made to replace the bridge. It is estimated that, by 2045, over 80,000 cars will pass over the bridge each day. The North Carolina Department of Transportation has conducted surveys that conclude the bridge will not be set for that many cars, and a failure could happen if not replaced or majority repaired. The new concepts include a bridge built to the south of the bridge at US 421 and a bridge parallel to the current bridge.

$15 million in work was done on the existing bridge in 2019 and a feasibility study on replacing the bridge followed; it concluded in late 2023. Current estimates show it will cost more than 400 million dollars to replace to the bridge. Maintenance will be required on the current bridge every 6 to 8 years.

== Future ==
In January 2024, the Wilmington Urban Area Metropolitan Planning Organization (WMPO) approved a $1.1 billion project to replace the bridge with a new toll bridge. It was reaffirmed by WMPO in May 2025.

== Gallery ==
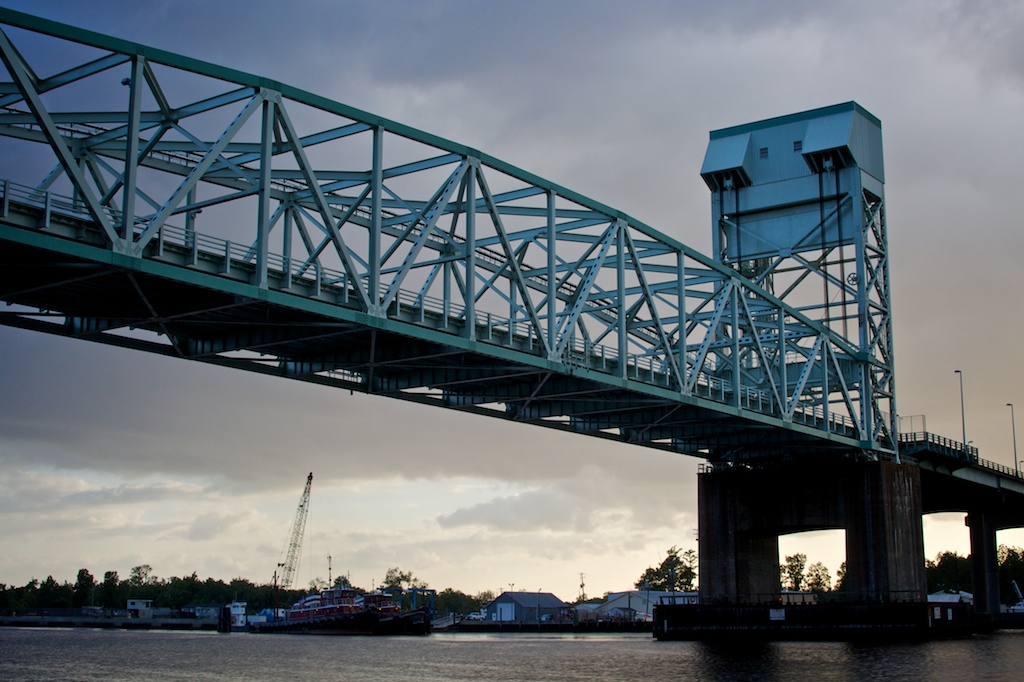

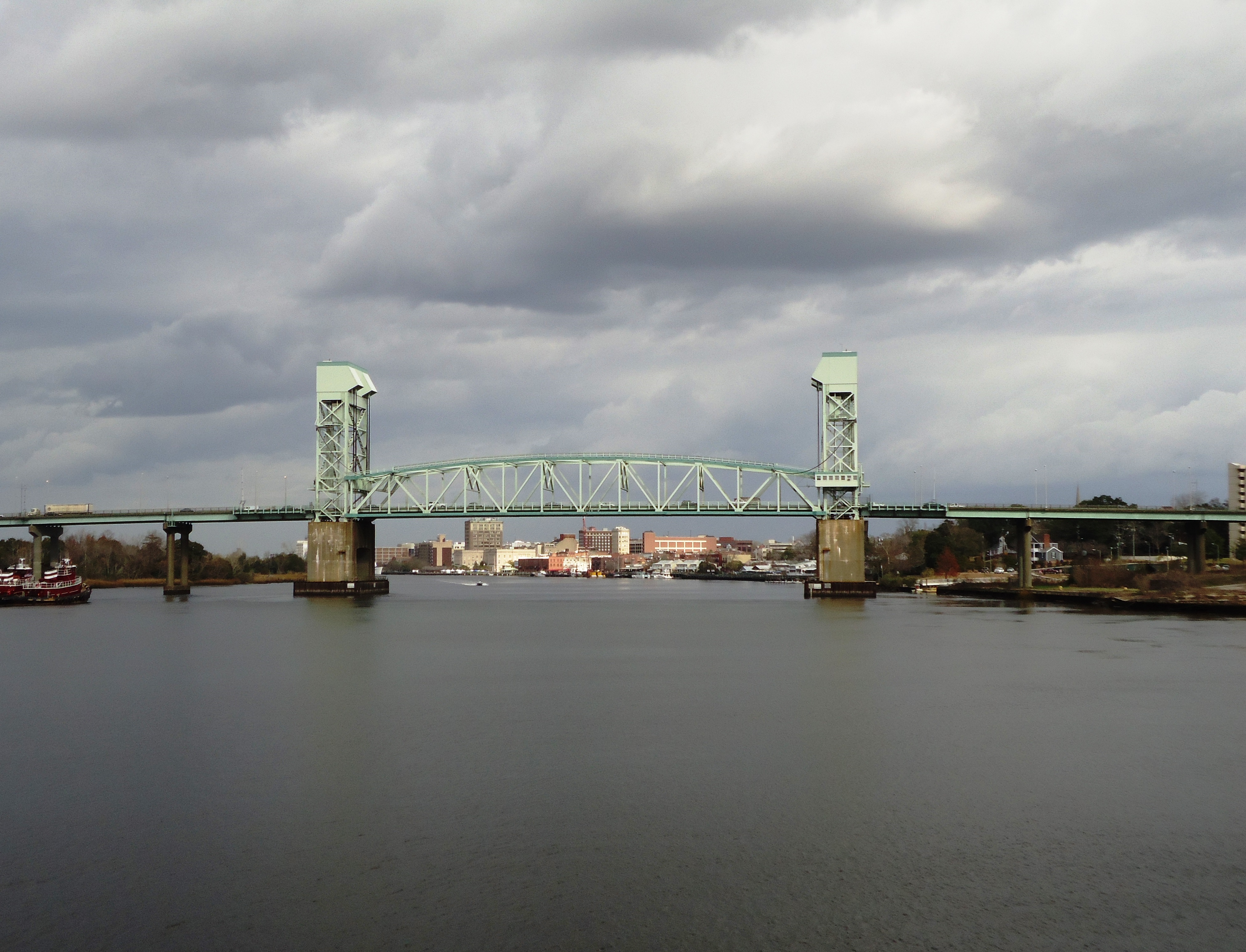

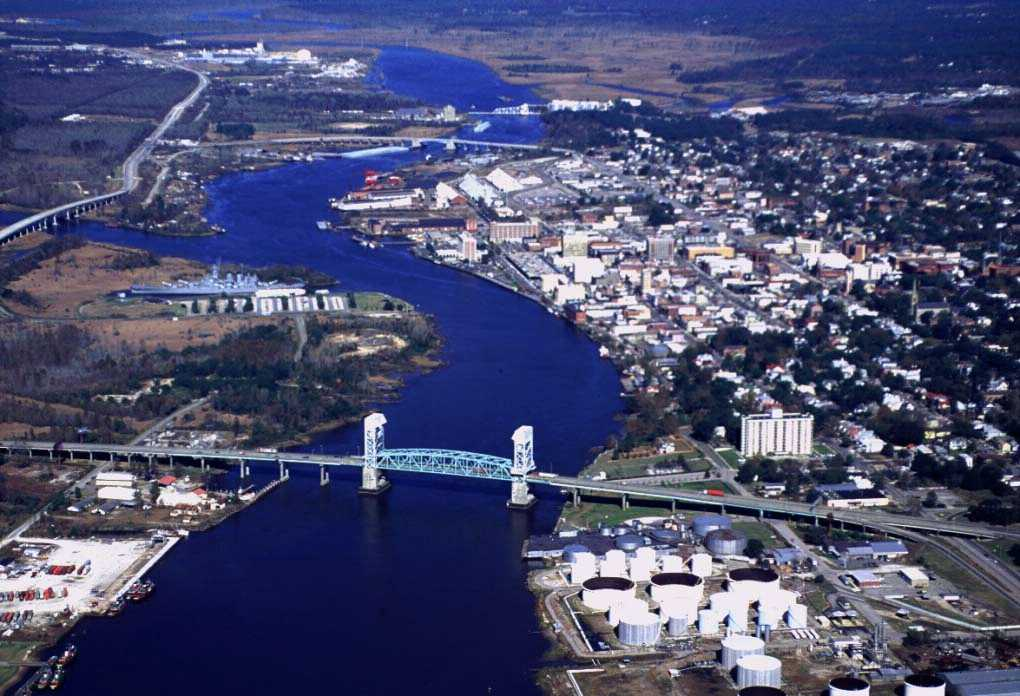

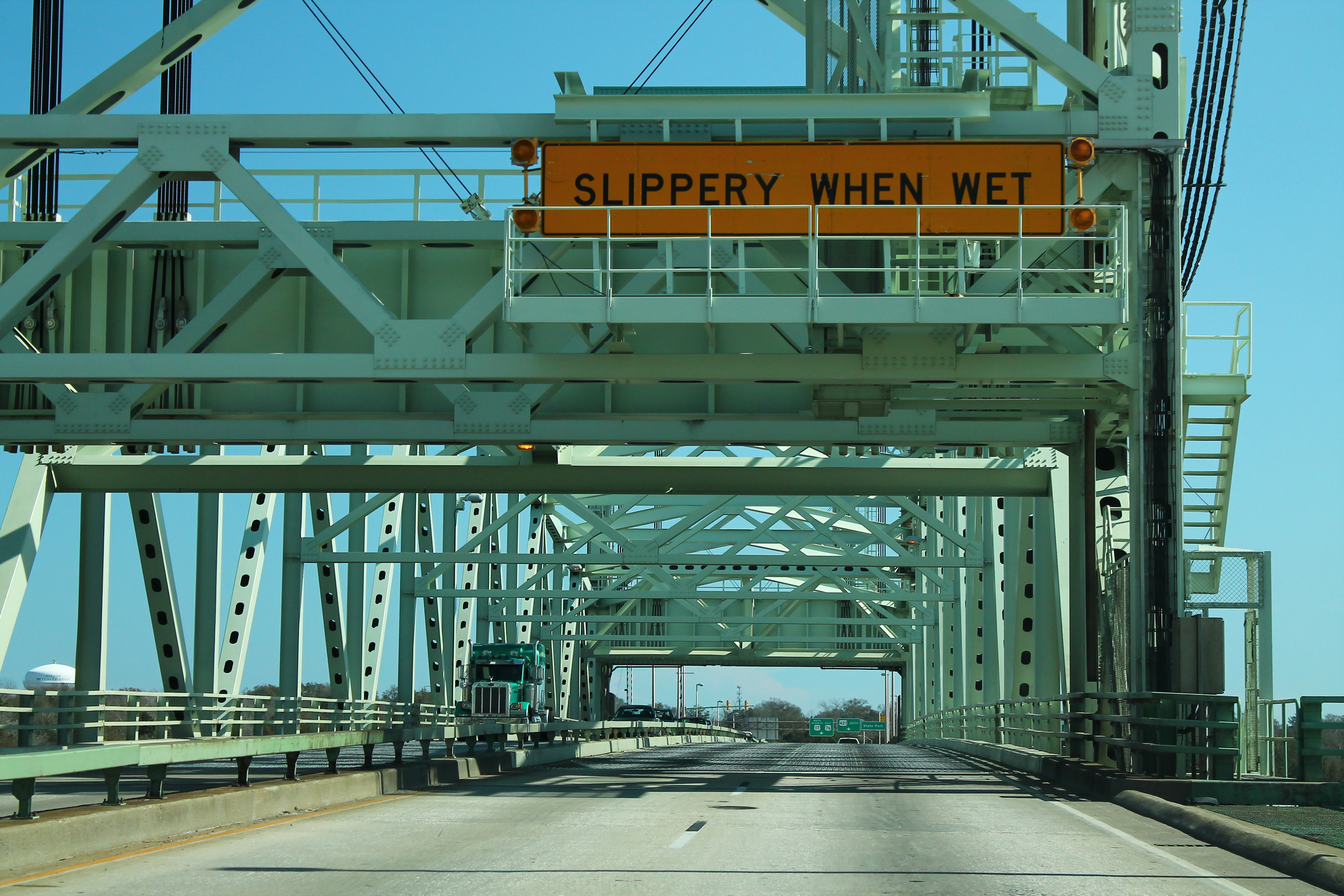

== See also ==
- Cape Fear Skyway, formerly proposed toll bridge across the Cape Fear River
- Interstate 140
- USS North Carolina (BB-55)
