= Brunswick River (North Carolina) =

Coordinates: 34.1798929°N 77.9616551°W

- View of the Brunswick River with Eagle Island

Location
- Country: United States

Physical characteristics
- Source
  - location: Cape Fear River
- Mouth
  - location: Cape Fear River
- Length: 6.2 mi (10.0 km)

The Brunswick River in North Carolina runs for 6.2 miles along the west bank of Eagle Island near the city of Leland. The Brunswick River is a fork of the Cape Fear River; the river starts as an offshoot of the Cape Fear River at the town of Navassa and flows back into the Cape Fear River at the southern tip of Eagle Island. Mill Creek and Alligator Creek flow into the Brunswick River.
