= Hampstead Bypass (North Carolina) =

Proposed state highway in North Carolina

U.S. Highway 17 Bypass and North Carolina Highway 417
- Hampstead Bypass
- The Military Cutoff Road extension highlighted in red and the Hampstead Bypass highlighted in orange

Route information
- Length: 15.522 mi (24.980 km)
- Existed: 2023–present
- History: First segment (Military Cutoff Road extension) opened in 2023 with a temporary designation of NC 417

Major junctions
- South end: US 17 / US 17 Bus. in Wilmington
- NC 140 near Kirkland
- North end: US 17 near Topsail Beach

Location
- Country: United States
- State: North Carolina
- Counties: New Hanover, Pender

Highway system
- North Carolina Highway System; Interstate; US; State; Scenic
← NC 411	→ US 421

The Hampstead Bypass, likely to be designated as U.S. Highway 17 Bypass (US 17 Byp.), is a planned route in the U.S. state of North Carolina, serving as a bypass of Ogden and Hampstead. It will consist of two sections which meet at North Carolina Highway 140 (NC 140): a limited-access extension of Military Cutoff Road, temporarily designated as North Carolina Highway 417 (NC 417), and a controlled-access portion that will serve as a bypass of Hampstead. The Military Cutoff Road extension began construction in 2017 and opened to traffic on September 28, 2023. Construction on the first portion of the Hampstead Bypass began on March 11, 2022 and is expected to be completed in 2026. Construction on the second portion is expected to begin soon after and be completed in 2030.

== Route description ==
The first section of the road begins at the extension of Military Cutoff Road (NC 417) at an interchange between US 17 (Military Cutoff Road/Market Street) and US 17 Business (US 17 Bus.; Market Street) near Ogden. It continues northwest as a six-lane at-grade expressway with a 45-mile-per-hour (72 km/h) speed limit through a wooded area, passing over Ogden Park Drive near Ogden Park. The route then comes to a large residential development in Murraysville, turning northeast and meeting three streets at signalized superstreet intersections. Moving into another wooded area, the route intersects a connector to Plantation Road, becoming a freeway immediately after. Military Cutoff Road will then end at an interchange with NC 140.

The second section will continue from the end of the Military Cutoff Road extension (NC 417) onto the future Hampstead Bypass, a four-lane freeway running through a wooded rural area. It will run further northeast for roughly seven miles (11 km), passing under Sidbury Road and Harrison Creek Road without interchanges, before meeting NC 210 at a diamond interchange northwest of Hampstead. Shortly after, the freeway will come to another interchange with Hoover Road. Northeast of Hampstead, it will turn east toward US 17, ending at an interchange with that road.

== History ==
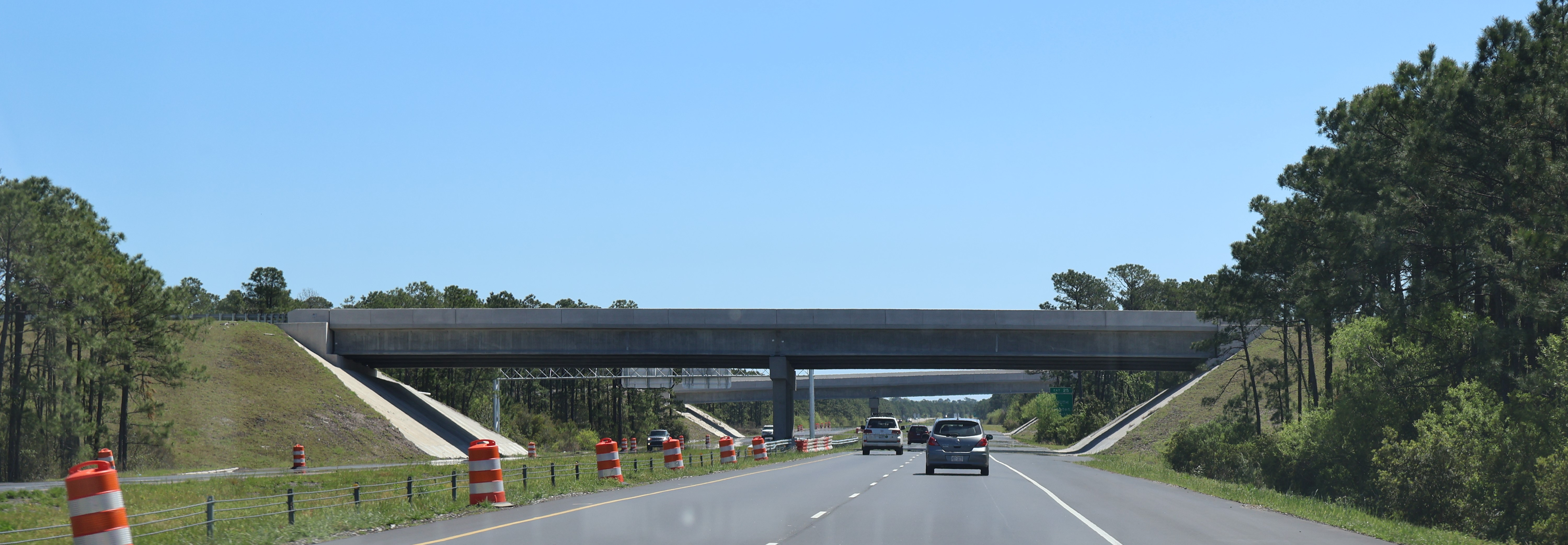
Construction of the US 17 Byp. (temporarily signed as NC 417)/NC 140 interchange in April 2023

Both the Military Cutoff Road extension and the Hampstead Bypass were first studied by the North Carolina Department of Transportation (NCDOT) in the 1990s as separate projects. A feasibility study was drafted in 1999 for the Hampstead Bypass, but the final study was never published. In 2004, the study was reinstated and the study for the Military Cutoff Road extension was published as well. The two projects were merged into a single major project because they end at the same point and function as a single road. The record of decision was completed in September 2014 after the final environmental impact statement was published the previous July.

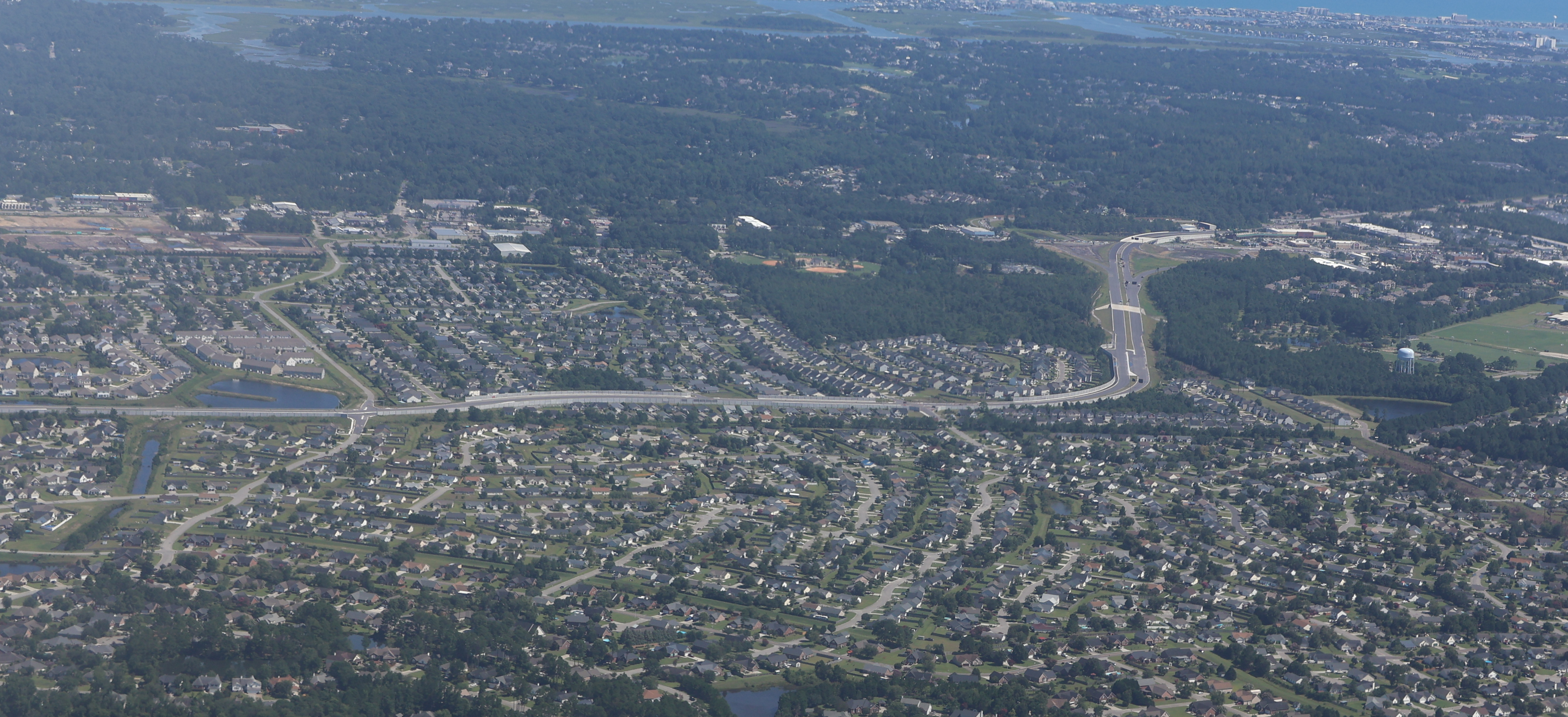
Aerial of the construction on the Military Cutoff Road extension in Murraysville, July 2023

Construction on the extension of Military Cutoff Road began in late 2017 starting with the interchanges at Market Street and NC 140.

Signing plans released in November 2017 indicated that the Military Cutoff Road extension would temporarily receive a state route designation which had not yet been determined. Local officials in March of that year had requested the US 17 Byp. designation for the entire corridor once complete, with US 17 to remain on its existing route. This was opposed by NCDOT on the grounds that the entire length of the road does not serve as a bypass of the greater Wilmington area, instead ending in the city. Additionally, this would result in three routes numbered 17 meeting at the same location—US 17, US 17 Bus., and US 17 Byp.—which could cause driver confusion. Rerouting US 17 onto the new road was considered, but local feedback from a public meeting in May 2018 showed that it would be costly and confusing for residents and businesses on US 17 to change their addresses.

Traffic shifts will take place at the southern terminus of the Military Cutoff Road extension, with traffic on the existing Military Cutoff Road (US 17) temporarily diverted onto the future ramps around Prospect Cemetery to allow construction of the bridge over Market Street (US 17/US 17 Bus.). The extension to NC 140 was expected to open to traffic in early 2023, but that was pushed out to mid-September 2023.

The Hampstead Bypass portion of the project is divided into two parts. The first to begin will be the section of the road between NC 210 and US 17 north of Hampstead and includes upgrading 5.5 miles (8.9 km) of US 17 in Hampstead to feature superstreet intersections. The second will complete the bypass between NC 140 and NC 210, completing the project overall. Though initial plans called for the US 17 upgrades to begin in 2021 and for the bypass to begin in 2025, funding was accelerated to allow both the US 17 upgrades and the northern section of the bypass to begin in 2020. It was then pushed to a start date of 2022 with overall completion of the project expected in 2030.

The Military Cutoff Road extension opened to traffic on September 28, 2023.

== Major intersections ==
=== Military Cutoff Road extension (NC 417) ===
North Carolina Highway 417
- Location: Wilmington–Kirkland
- Length: 3.55 mi (5.71 km)
- Existed: September 28, 2023–present

Listed below are the major junctions of the Military Cutoff Road extension. Exits will be unnumbered until the Hampstead Bypass is completed. The entire route is New Hanover County.

Location	mi	km	Destinations	Notes
Wilmington	0.00	0.00	US 17 north (Market Street) US 17 south to US 74 east / US 76 – Wrightsville Beach US 17 Bus. south (Market Street) – Downtown	Interchange; southern terminus; US 17 (Military Cutoff Road) continues south
Murraysville	1.02	1.64	Bradfield Court / Putnam Drive	Superstreet intersection
Murraysville	1.39	2.24	Brittany Lakes Drive / Lendire Drive	Superstreet intersection
Murraysville	1.69	2.72	Torchwood Boulevard / Bayshore Drive	Superstreet intersection
Murraysville	2.72	4.38	Begin freeway	
Kirkland	3.55	5.71	NC 140 west to I-40 – Raleigh NC 140 east to US 17 north – Jacksonville, New Bern	Military Cutoff Road ends; temporary northern terminus
1.000 mi = 1.609 km; 1.000 km = 0.621 mi

=== Hampstead Bypass ===
Listed below are the major junctions of the Hampstead Bypass, currently under construction.

County	Location	mi	km	Exit	Destinations	Notes
New Hanover	Kirkland	3.00	4.83	3	NC 140 west to I-40 – Raleigh NC 140 east	Hampstead Bypass begins
Pender		9.75	15.69	9	NC 210	
Pender		12.00	19.31	12	Hoover Road	
Pender		14.52	23.37	14	US 17 north / NC 210 east – Jacksonville, New Bern US 17 south / NC 210 west – Wilmington	Future northern terminus
1.000 mi = 1.609 km; 1.000 km = 0.621 mi: Unopened
