= New Hanover County, North Carolina =

County in North Carolina, United States

- County
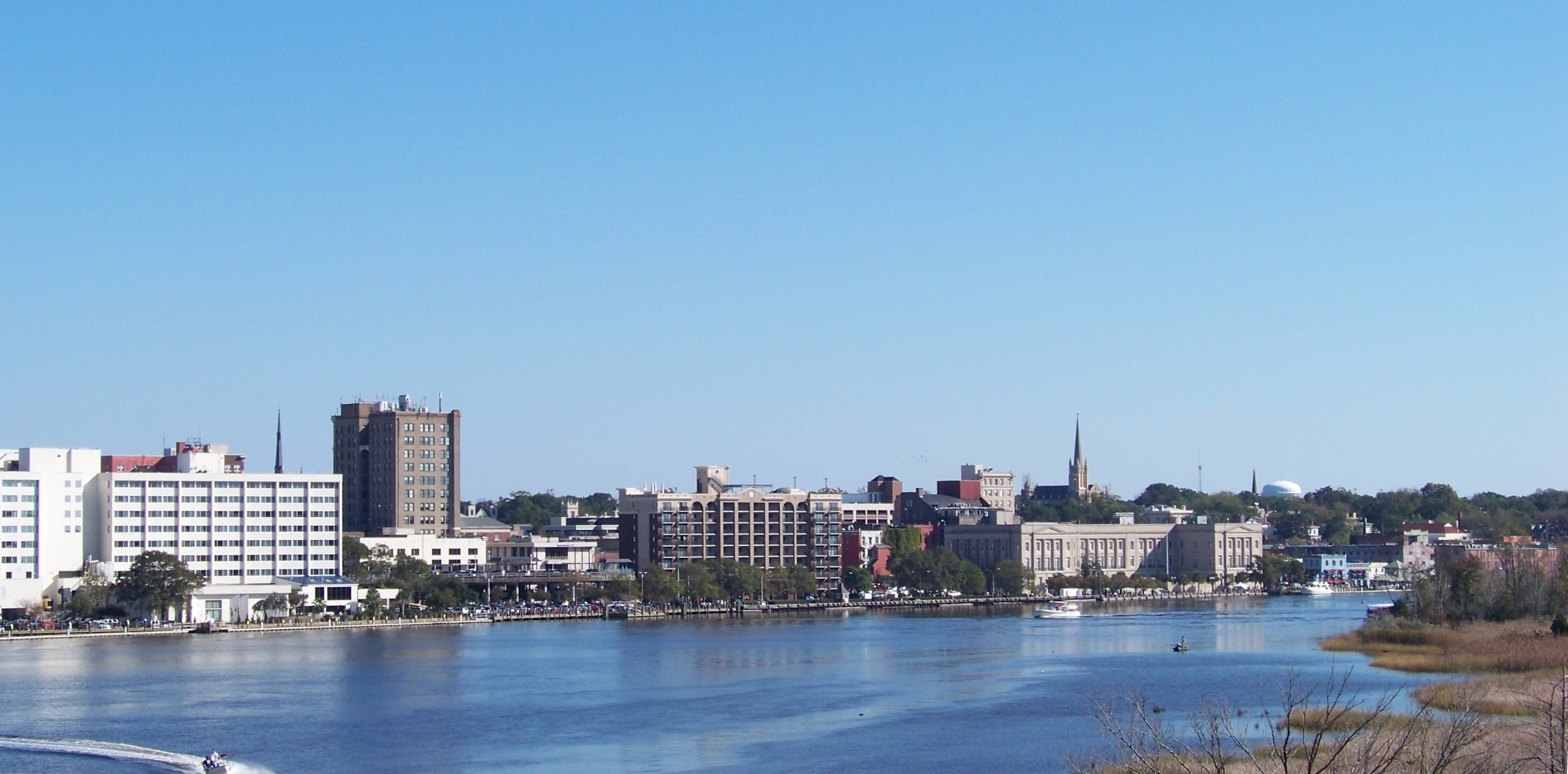
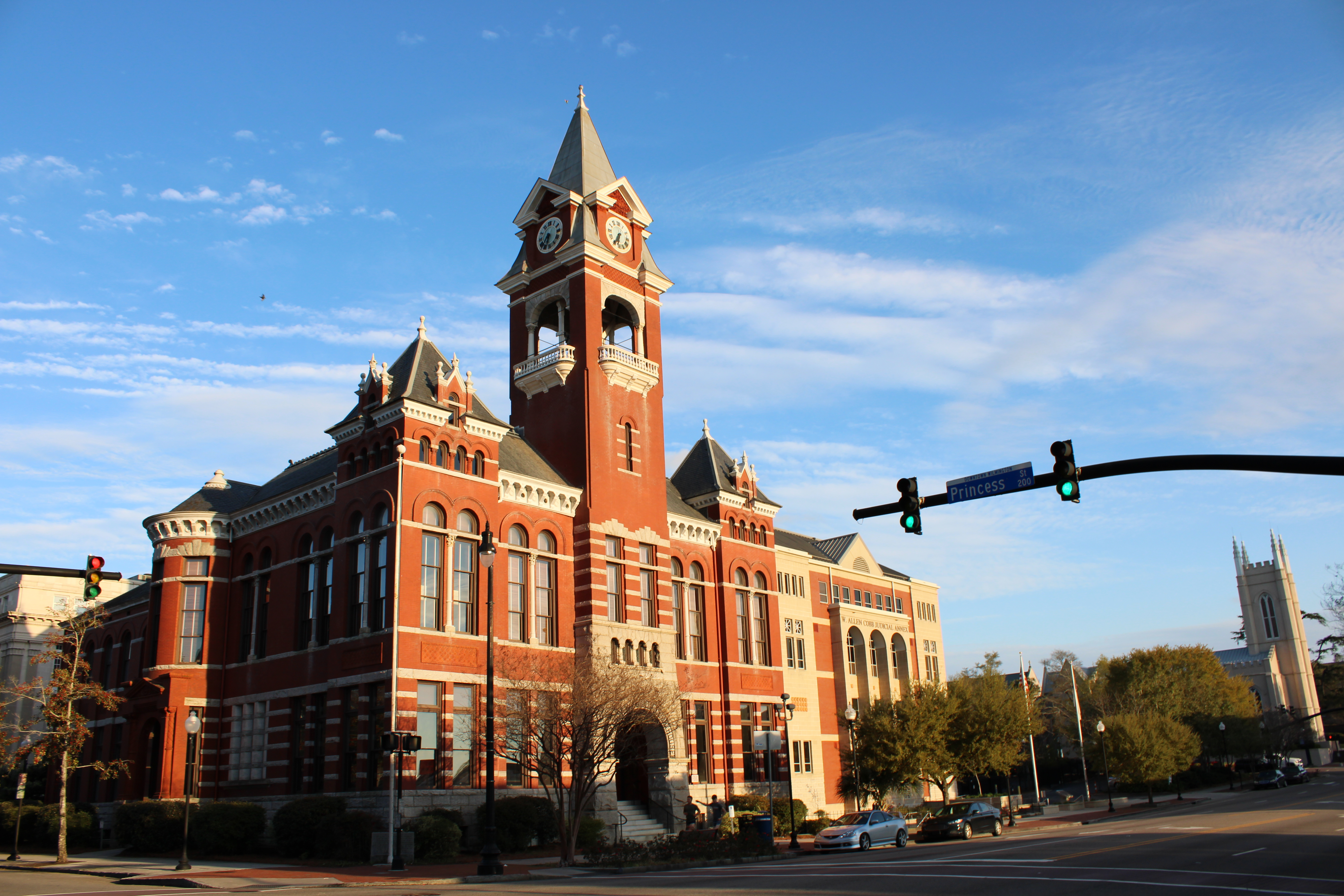
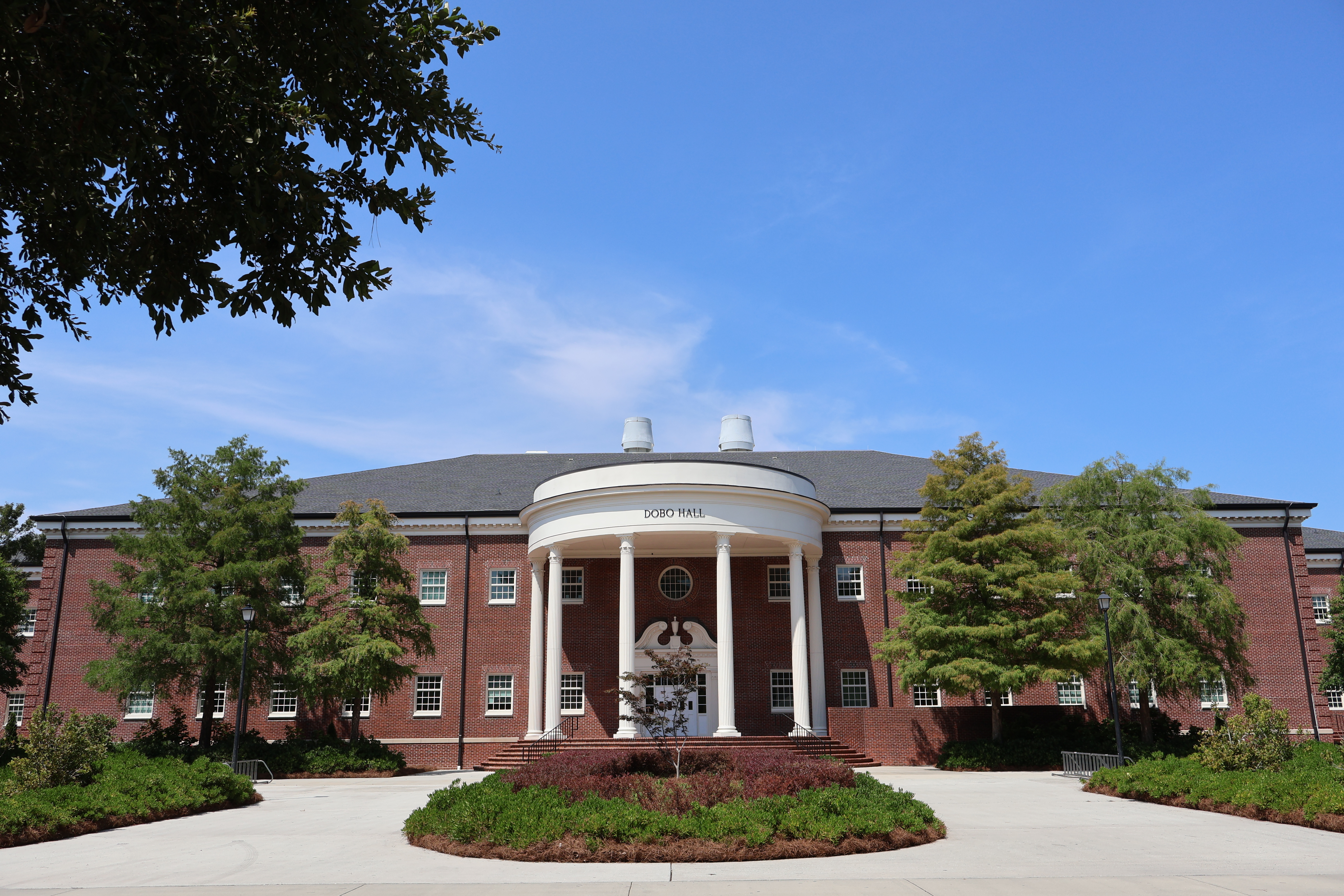
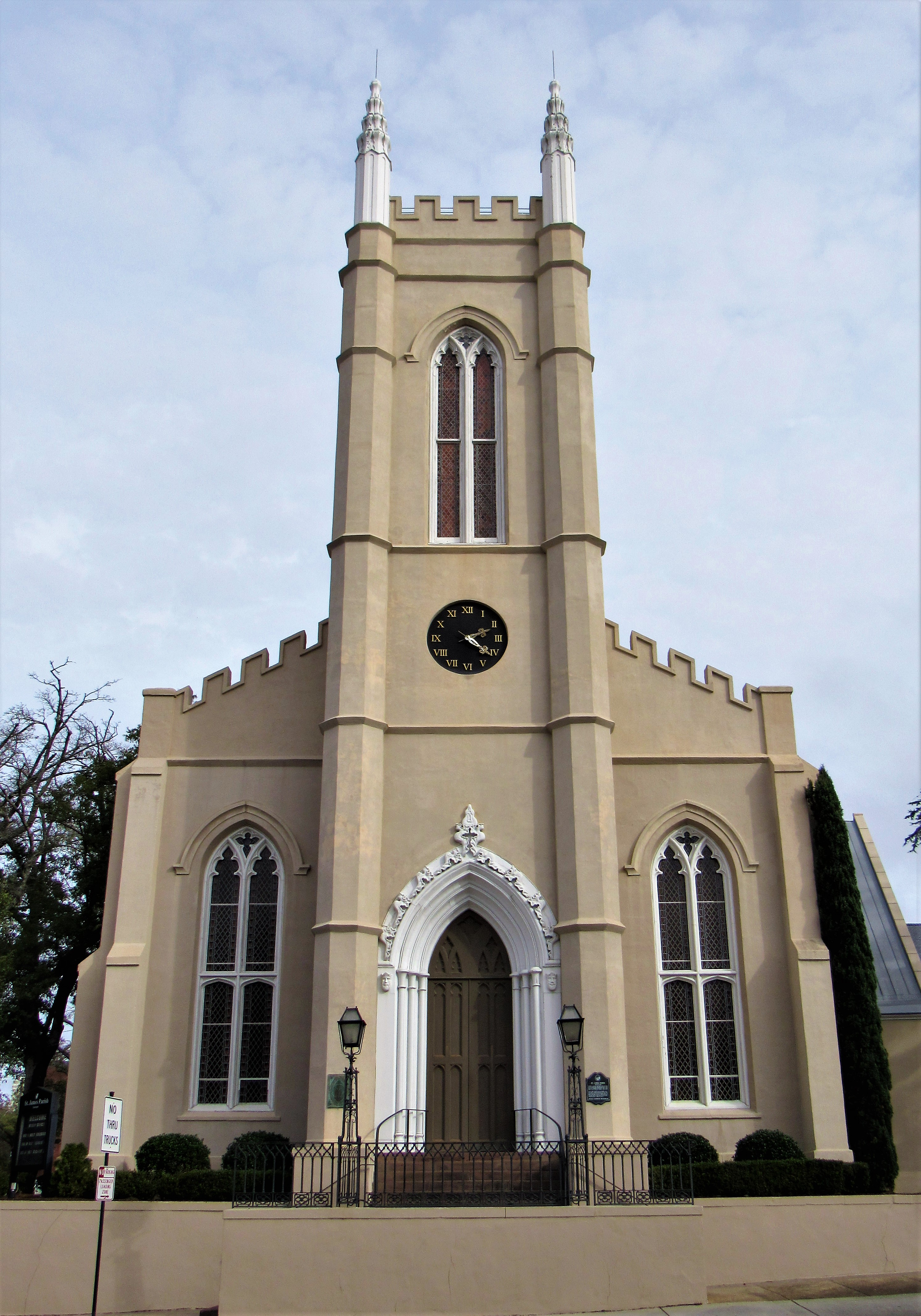
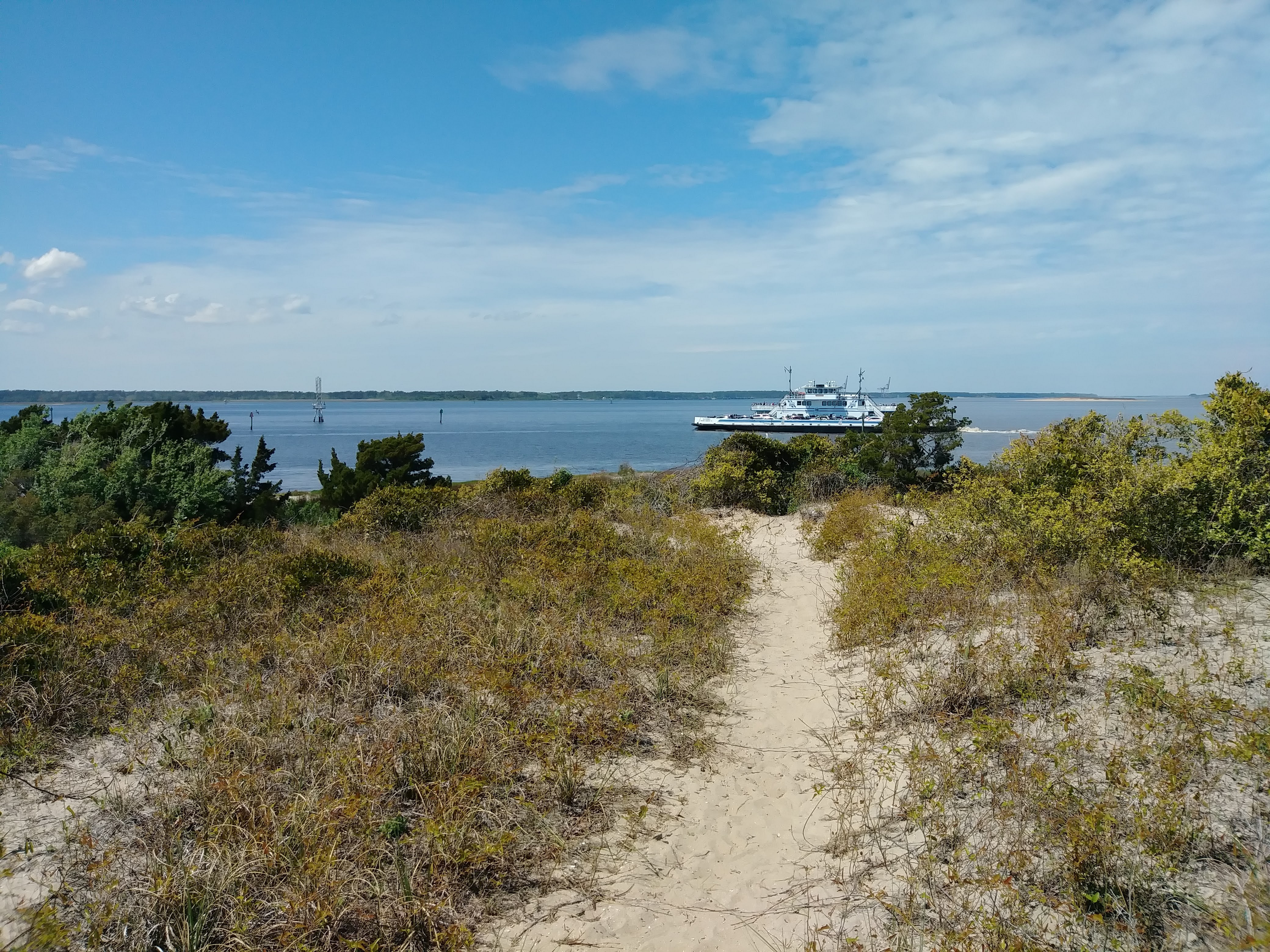
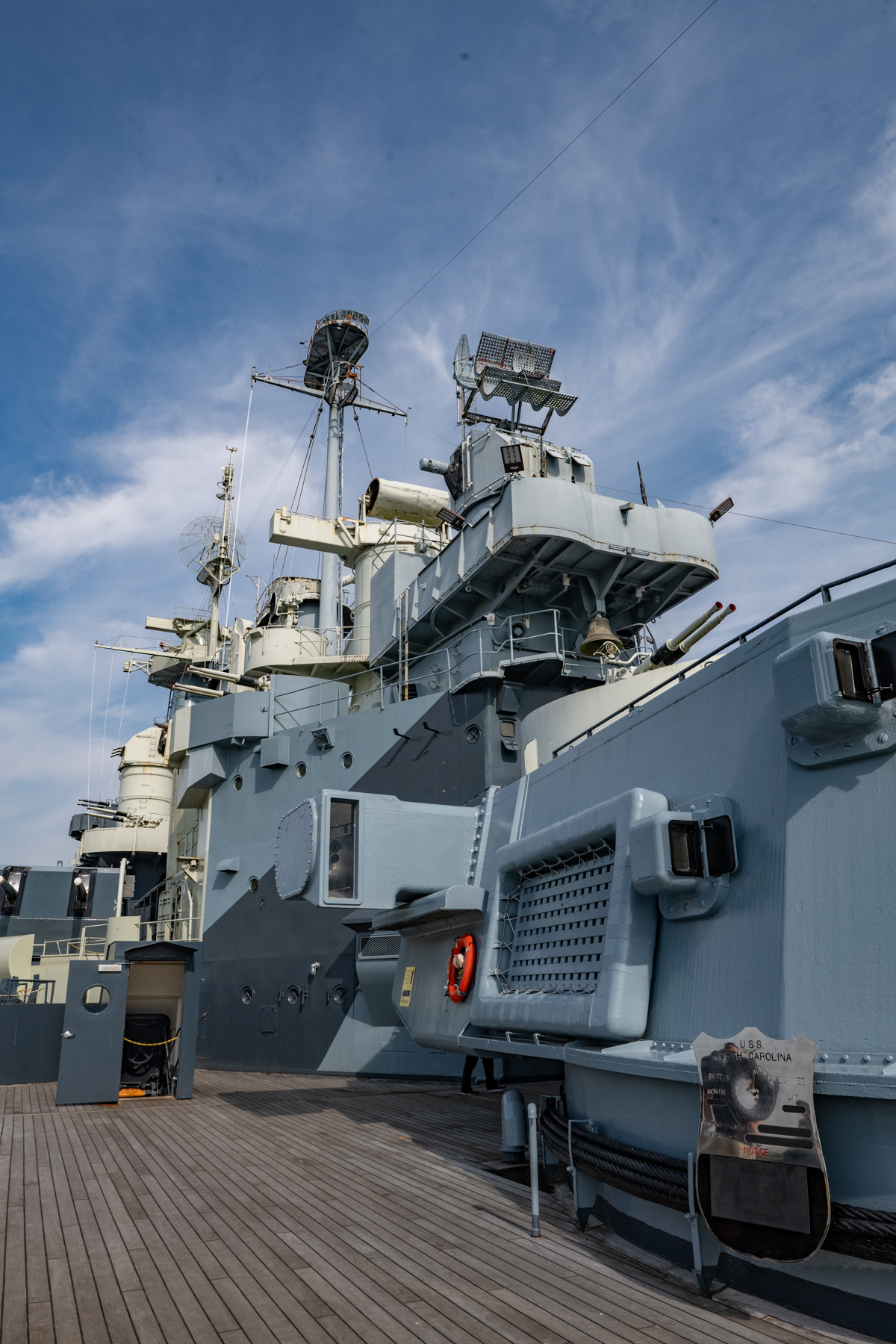
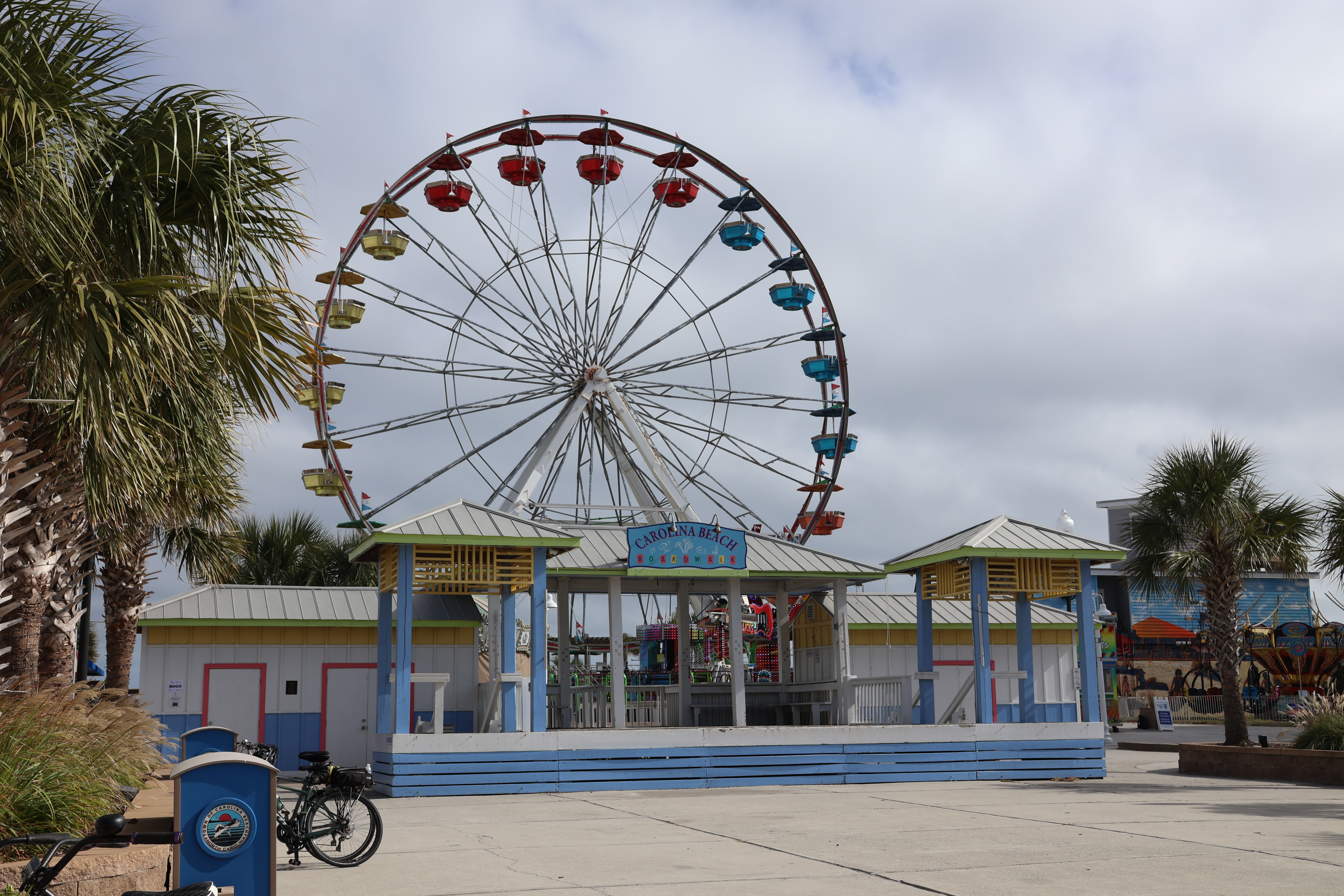
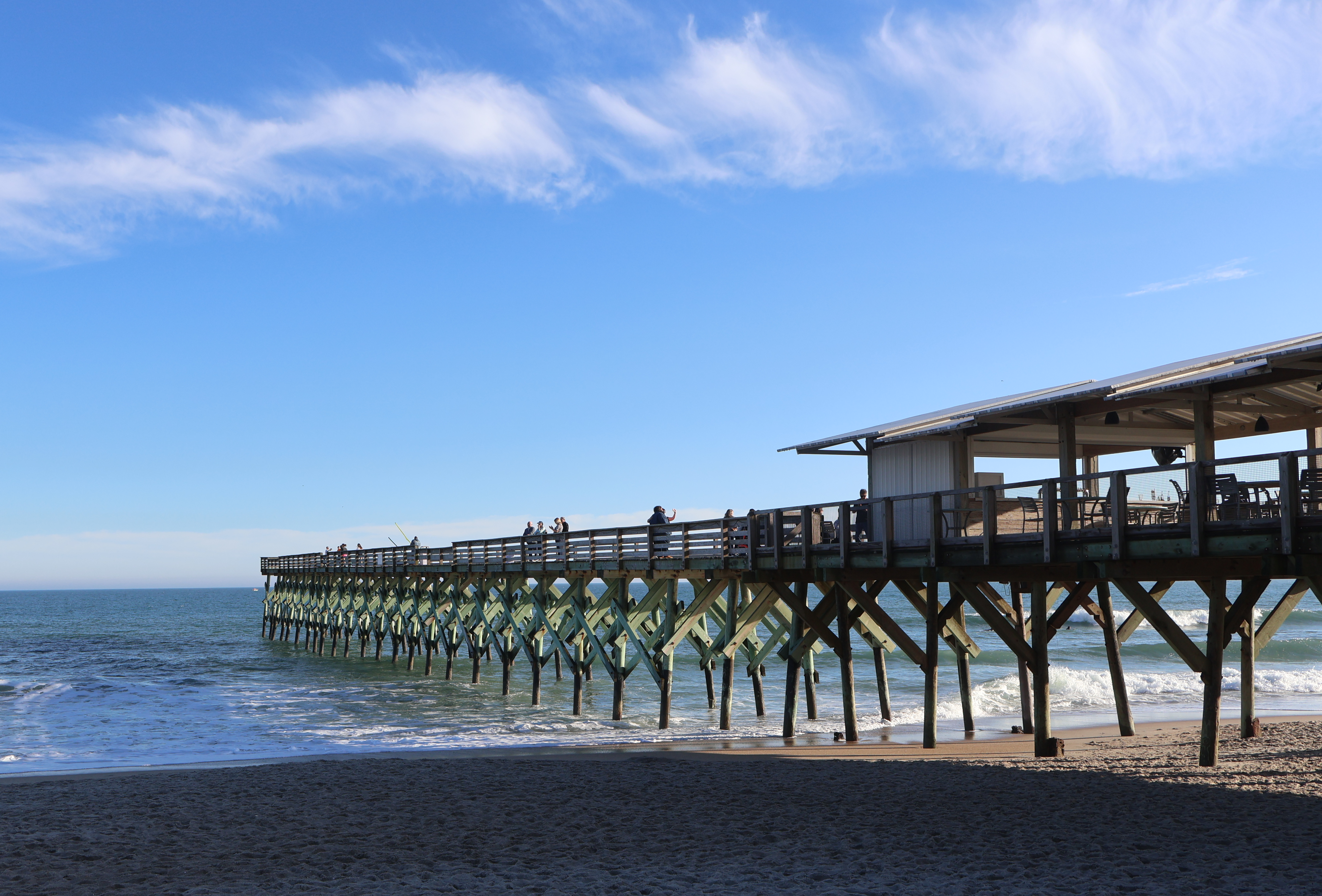
- Wilmington skyline New Hanover County Courthouse University of North Carolina Wilmington St. James Episcopal Church Fort Fisher State Historic Site USS North Carolina Carolina Beach Boardwalk Wrightsville Beach's Crystal Pier

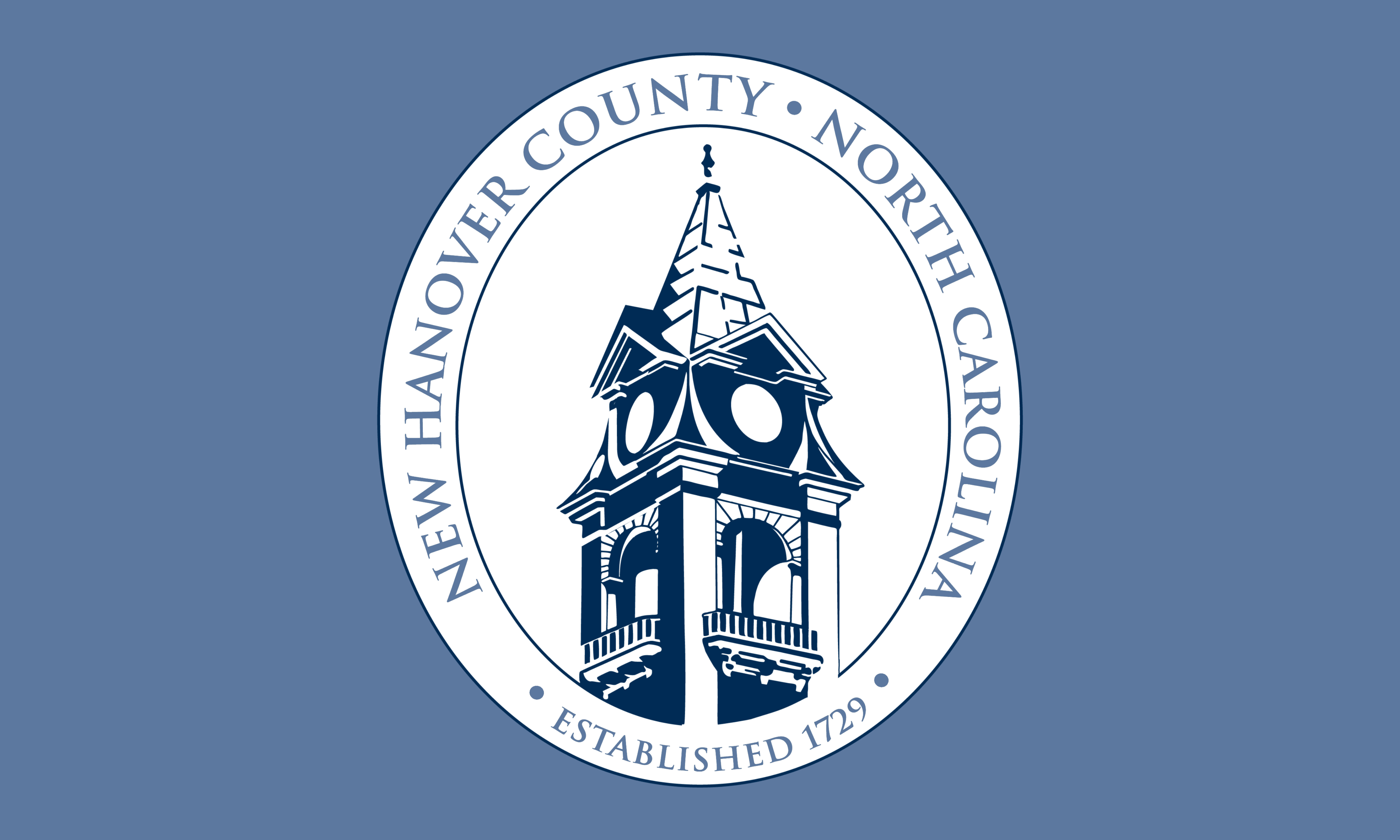
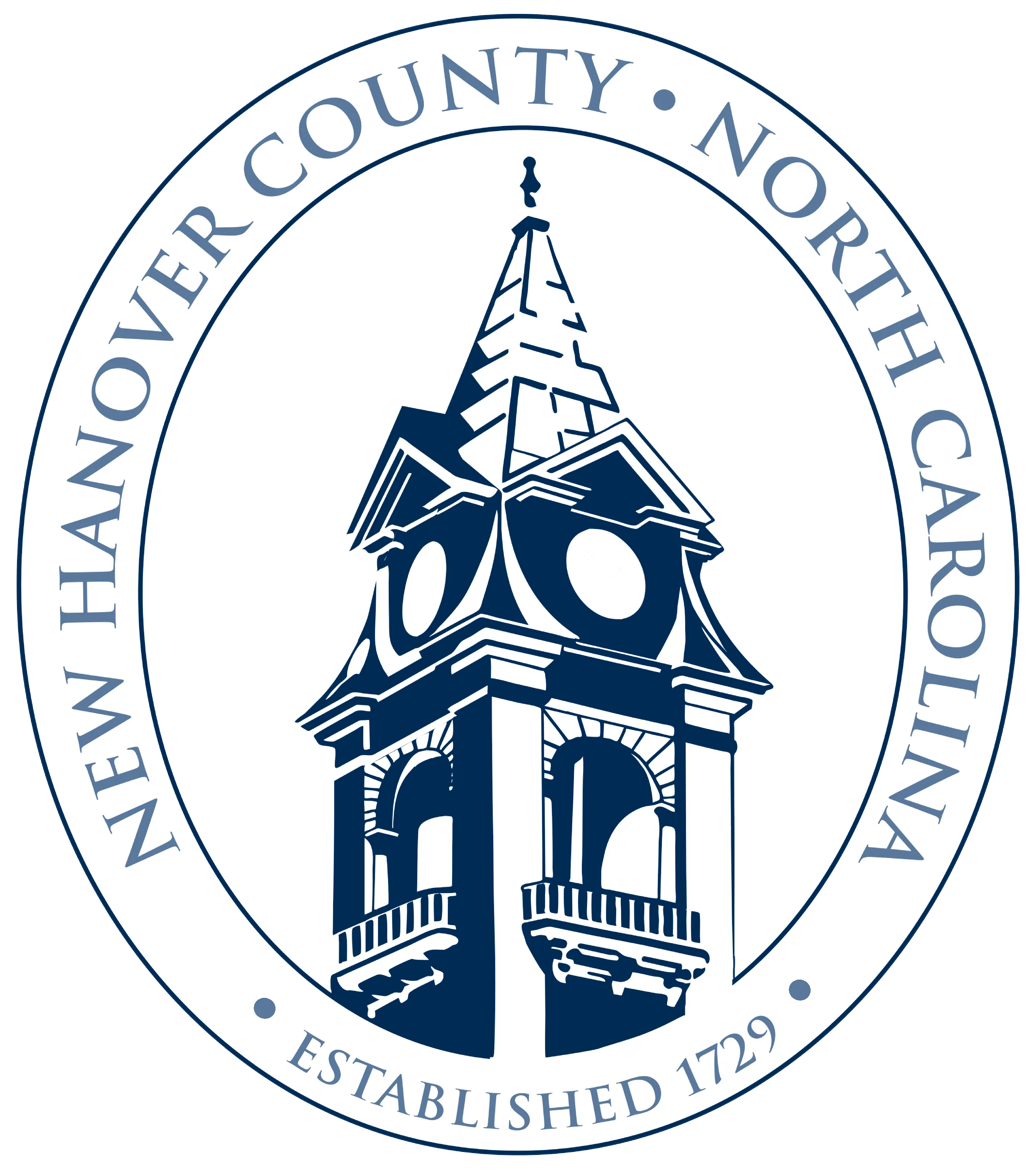
- Flag Seal
- Motto: "The model of good governance"
- Location within the U.S. state of North Carolina
- Coordinates: 34.18°N 77.86°W
- Country: United States
- State: North Carolina
- Founded: 1729
- Named for: House of Hanover
- Seat: Wilmington
- Largest community: Wilmington

Area
  - Total: 328.86 sq mi (851.7 km^{2})
  - Land: 192.26 sq mi (498.0 km^{2})
  - Water: 136.60 sq mi (353.8 km^{2}) 41.54%

Population (2020)
  - Total: 225,702
  - Estimate (2025): 245,959 ▲
  - Density: 1,173.94/sq mi (453.26/km^{2})
- Time zone: UTC−5 (Eastern)
  - Summer (DST): UTC−4 (EDT)
- Congressional district: 7th
- Website: www.nhcgov.com

New Hanover County is a county located in the U.S. state of North Carolina. As of the 2020 census, the population was 225,702. The county seat is Wilmington. Though the second-smallest county in North Carolina by land area, it is one of the most populous counties, as Wilmington is one of the largest communities in the state. The county was created in 1729 as New Hanover Precinct and gained county status in 1739. New Hanover County is included in the Wilmington, NC Metropolitan Statistical Area, which also includes neighboring Pender and Brunswick counties.

== History ==
=== Early history ===
Prior to European settlement, New Hanover county was populated by two Native American tribes, namely the Cape Fear Indians and the Waccamaw. Proof of settlement dates back to roughly 8000 BC, and Natives resided intermittently in the area throughout the first millennium. The first European to visit the area was the Italian-born French explorer Giovanni da Verrazano in 1524, who reported his findings back to France, which took no further action. In 1526, Spaniard Lucas Vázquez de Ayllón led an expedition to the area, wrecking a ship in the process but also moving on from the area. In 1662, a New England expedition led by captain William Hilton traveled to the area, seeking to find a more temperate climate to establish a Puritan colony. After reporting favorable findings, a group of settlers arrived in the area, naming it "Cape Fear," but they too departed shortly for unknown reasons. Repeated failures to establish a settlement led to the area being left uninhabited for another century, and even the Cape Fear Indians, decimated by war and tribal infighting, were eventually forced to leave.

Finally being permanently settled in 1726, the county was formed in 1729 as New Hanover Precinct of Bath County, from Craven Precinct. It was named for the House of Hanover, a German royal family then ruling Great Britain. In 1734, parts of New Hanover Precinct became Bladen Precinct and Onslow Precinct. With the abolition of Bath County in 1739, all of its constituent precincts became counties. In 1750, the northern part of New Hanover County became Duplin County. In 1764, another part of New Hanover County was combined with part of Bladen County to form Brunswick County. Finally, in 1875, the separation of northern New Hanover County to form Pender County reduced it to its present dimensions. Originally designated as one of North Carolina's five ports, the Port of Brunswick (then the county seat) quickly developed into the state's most important port. During this time, the city of Wilmington (then called Newton) was formed, quickly surpassing Brunswick as the dominant city in the county and becoming the county seat. During this time, the county developed plantations, largely for the cultivation of tobacco and other commodity crops by enslaved African Americans. Despite this, the maritime nature of the county and relatively poor agricultural conditions meant that the plantation economy never managed to eclipse the trade economy.

=== Revolutionary War and Antebellum period ===
Following the French and Indian War, the English government instituted the Stamp Act in order to pay for additional security measures. Enraged, locals marched to Brunswick and placed governor William Tryon under virtual house arrest, marking one of the first major protests against the crown. In 1776, Continental Army colonel James Moore crushed Loyalist forces at the Battle of Moore's Creek Bridge, and the United States Declaration of Independence followed five months later. The British only managed to recapture Wilmington five years later, only to be bloodlessly recaptured by Americans following the surrender of General Charles Cornwallis.

During the Antebellum Period, New Hanover County steadily grew in importance as the growth of interior North Carolina and the opening of trade with the Caribbean led to a surge in trade, mainly conducted from the Port of Wilmington, which had been renamed after Brunswick was depopulated. Improvements were done to the Cape Fear River in order to allow easier navigability, and the arrival of the steamboat in 1817 and the railroad in 1840 led to the explosive growth of Wilmington. By 1860, Wilmington had 4 of the 36 banks in the state.

=== Civil War and Reconstruction ===
By 1860, the county seat and county were majority-black in population, with most of those people enslaved. Wilmington was of crucial importance to the Confederacy as a blockade-running center, as its port allowed supplies to be sent directly via the Wilmington and Weldon Railroad to resupply Confederate troops in the north. Confederates established Fort Fisher, which was seen by both sides as second in importance only to Richmond. Some of the closing battles of the American Civil War took place in this county, including the Second Battle of Fort Fisher (the last major coastal stronghold of the Confederacy) and the Battle of Wilmington, and the fall of Wilmington marked the last days of the Confederacy.

Following the end of the war, Wilmington was placed under military rule. A new constitution granting the vote to freedmen was established in 1868. During the Reconstruction era, the Republican Party, with a stronghold in the port city of Wilmington, captured political control of New Hanover. After the rival Conservative Party took a majority of the seats of the North Carolina General Assembly, the Conservatives sought to break the Republicans regional strength. In 1875, the legislature split off the northern two-thirds of New Hanover to create Pender County. As a result, New Hanover lost a constituency in the legislature and was geographically reduced to the Wilmington area and a sparsely-populated peninsula. The General Assembly also gerrymandered wards in the city of Wilmington to further dilute Republican strength.

Violence by whites against blacks increased in the late 19th century, with 22 lynching deaths of African Americans recorded before the mid-20th century. Racial terrorism on a larger scale took place in the Wilmington massacre of 1898, when a group of white Democrats rejected a duly elected, biracial city government. After overthrowing the Fusionist government, the mayor and city council, they led mobs that rioted and attacked the city's black neighborhoods and residents. A total of 60 to 300 blacks are believed to have been killed in the rioting, leaders were driven out of the city, and the presses of a black-owned newspaper were destroyed, along with many houses and businesses. Soon after, the state passed a new constitution raising barriers to voter registration: this effectively disenfranchised most blacks and imposed Jim Crow laws, destroying the political relevance of both the Black population and the Republican Party.

=== Modern times ===
Wilmington's economy was decimated during Reconstruction due to the declining importance of the cotton trade, for which Wilmington had been a major port. During World War I, Wilmington got some brief respite due to the shipbuilding industry, although this was short-lived. Wilmington's economy continued to stutter through the Great Depression, and World War II saw a rebound for the city's economy. The North Carolina Shipbuilding Company was established in 1941, and Wilmington became one of the nation's most crucial shipyards during the war, with its economy continuing to grow after the war had ended.

The growth of America's interstate freeways and the onset of the trucking industry continued to benefit New Hanover County, and during the post-war period the large number of returning soldiers joined the newfound labor force in suburbanizing and growing the county. By the 1960s, New Hanover County had a diversified economy, and historic preservation movements led to the revitalization of the county. The USS North Carolina was berthed in Wilmington as a museum ship in 1961, which led to a downtown revitalization effort and supercharged the city's tourist economy. The University of North Carolina Wilmington was granted university status in 1969, and is estimated to contribute billions yearly to the county's economy.

Beginning in the 1980s, the city saw an explosion in population due to the rapidly growing film industry. The establishment of De Laurentiis Entertainment Group led to a major studio presence in the county, and the area is now known as "Hollywood East." This growth was compounded by the construction of Interstate 40, which connected the city and its port to the rest of the country via interstate for the first time. This growth has continued into the 21st century, and was even further exacerbated by the COVID-19 pandemic, after which the county saw an influx of remote workers and retirees, while UNC Wilmington is the fastest growing campus in the UNC system. New Hanover County is now nearly completely developed, and continues to rank in the top 10 North Carolinian counties for GDP growth.

== Geography ==
Interactive map of New Hanover County

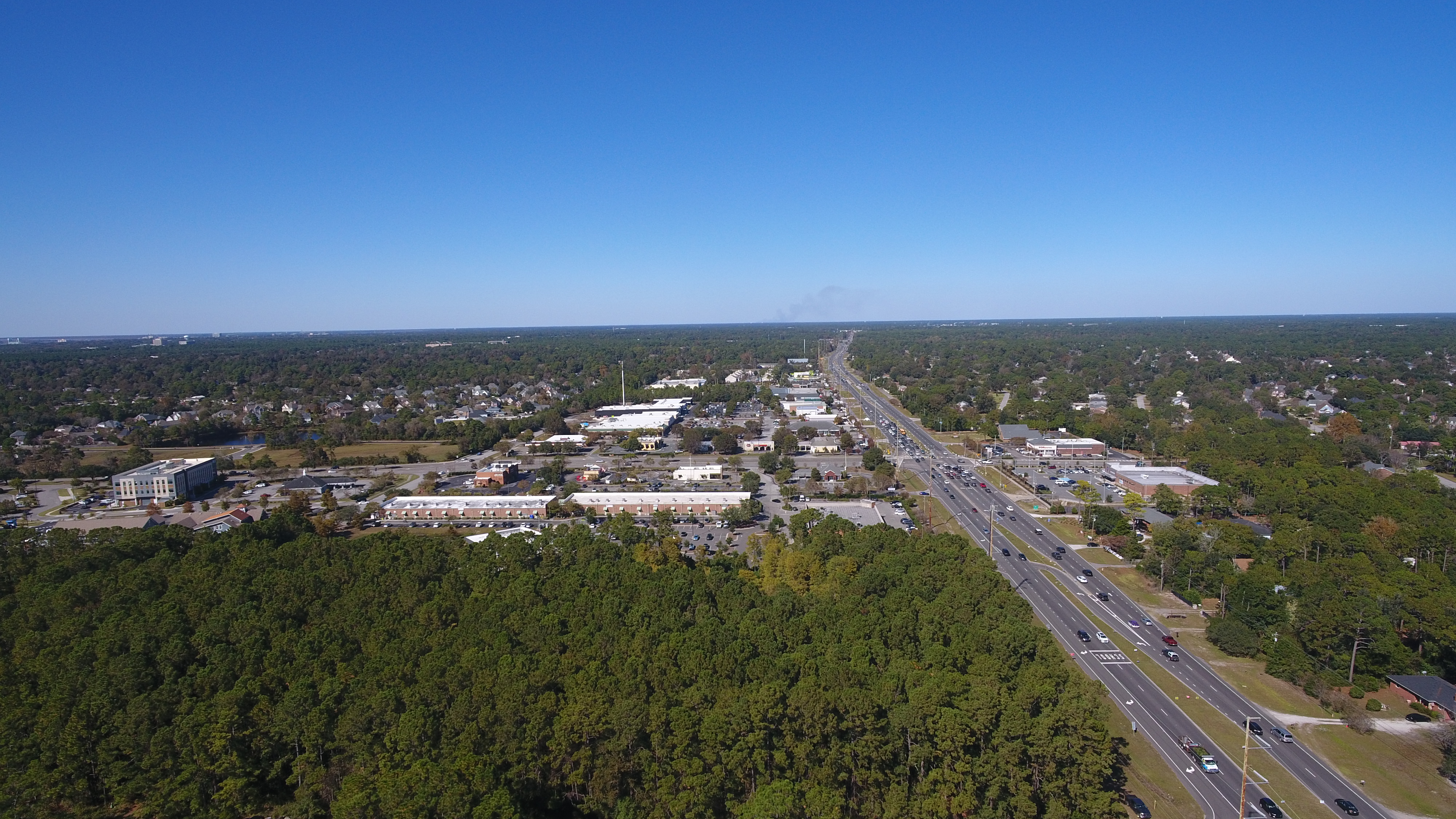
Intersection of South College Road, South 17th Street, and Waltmoor Road from the air

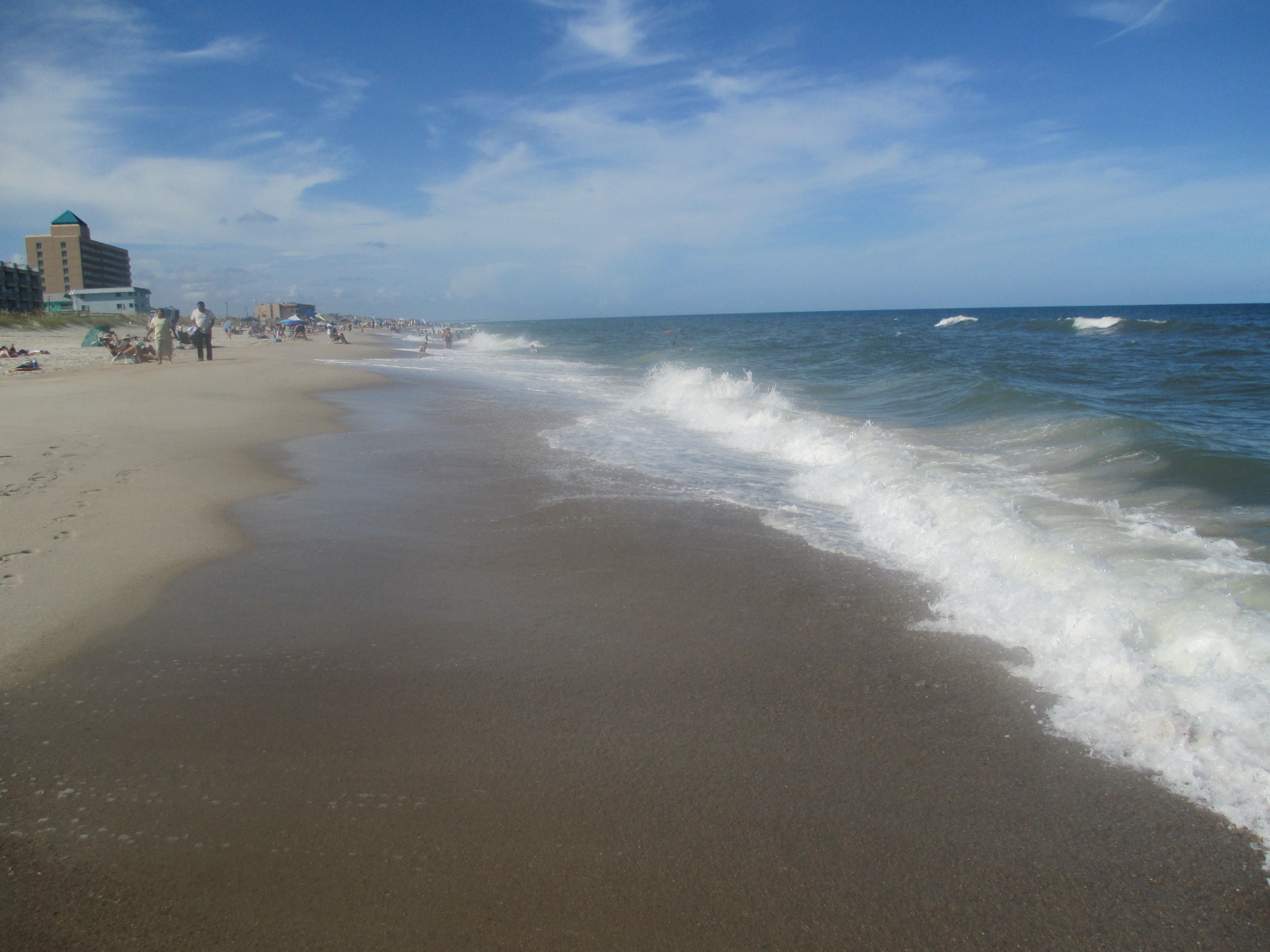
The surf at Carolina Beach

According to the U.S. Census Bureau, the county has a total area of 328.86 square miles (851.7 km^{2}), of which 192.26 square miles (498.0 km^{2}) is land and 136.60 square miles (353.8 km^{2}) (41.54%) is water. It is the second-smallest county in North Carolina by land area (ahead of only Chowan County).

=== State and local protected areas/sites ===
- Airlie Gardens
- Battleship North Carolina
- Bluethenthal Wildflower Preserve
- Cape Fear Museum of History and Science
- Cape Fear River Wetlands Game Land (part)
- Carolina Beach State Park
- Federal Point
- Fort Fisher State Historic Site
- Fort Fisher State Recreation Area
- Freeman Park
- Masonboro Island Estuarine Reserve Dedicated Nature Preserve
- Masonboro Island Reserve
- Masonboro Sound Area Outstanding Resource Water
- New Hanover County Arboretum
- North Carolina Aquarium at Fort Fisher
- Pages Creek Park Preserve
- The Rocks at Fort Fisher
- South of Onslow County Mechanical Harvesting of Oysters Prohibited Area (part)
- Sutton Lake Game Land
- Topsail Sound and Middle Sound Area Outstanding Resource Water
- Wilmington Historic District
- Zekes Island Estuarine Reserve Dedicated Nature Preserve (part)
- Zeke's Island Reserve (part)

=== Major water bodies ===
- Atlantic Ocean (North Atlantic Ocean)
- Banks Channel
- Bradley Creek
- Brunswick River
- Cape Fear River
- Frying Pan Shoals
- Futch Creek
- Greenfield Lake
- Hewletts Creek
- Howe Creek
- Intracoastal Waterway
- Island Creek
- Lake Sutton
- Leutze Lake
- Northeast Cape Fear River
- Onslow Bay
- Prince George Creek
- Smith Creek
- Snow's Cut
- Whiskey Creek

=== Major islands ===
- Eagles Island
- Pleasure Island
- Figure Eight Island
- Masonboro Island
- Wrightsville Beach
- Zeke’s Island

=== Adjacent counties ===
- Pender County – north
- Brunswick County – west

=== Major highways ===
- I-40
- I-140 / NC 140
- US 17
- US 17 Bus.
- US 17 Byp. (future Hampstead Bypass)
- US 74
- US 76
- US 117
- US 421
- US 421 Truck
- NC 132
- NC 133
- NC 211
- NC 417 (temporary highway designation for US 17 Byp.)

=== Major infrastructure ===
- Amtrak Thruway (Forden Station)
- Cape Fear Public Transportation Authority
- Pilots Ridge, small private airport near Myrtle Grove
- Port of Wilmington
- Southport–Fort Fisher Ferry (to Brunswick County)
- Wilmington International Airport

== Demographics ==
Historical population
Census	Pop.	Note	%±
1790	6,837		—
1800	7,060		3.3%
1810	11,465		62.4%
1820	10,866		−5.2%
1830	10,959		0.9%
1840	13,312		21.5%
1850	17,668		32.7%
1860	21,715		22.9%
1870	27,978		28.8%
1880	21,376		−23.6%
1890	24,026		12.4%
1900	25,785		7.3%
1910	32,037		24.2%
1920	40,620		26.8%
1930	43,010		5.9%
1940	47,935		11.5%
1950	63,272		32.0%
1960	71,742		13.4%
1970	82,996		15.7%
1980	103,471		24.7%
1990	120,284		16.2%
2000	160,307		33.3%
2010	202,667		26.4%
2020	225,702		11.4%
2025 (est.)	245,959	▲	9.0%
U.S. Decennial Census; 1790–1960 1900–1990; 1990–2000 2010 2020

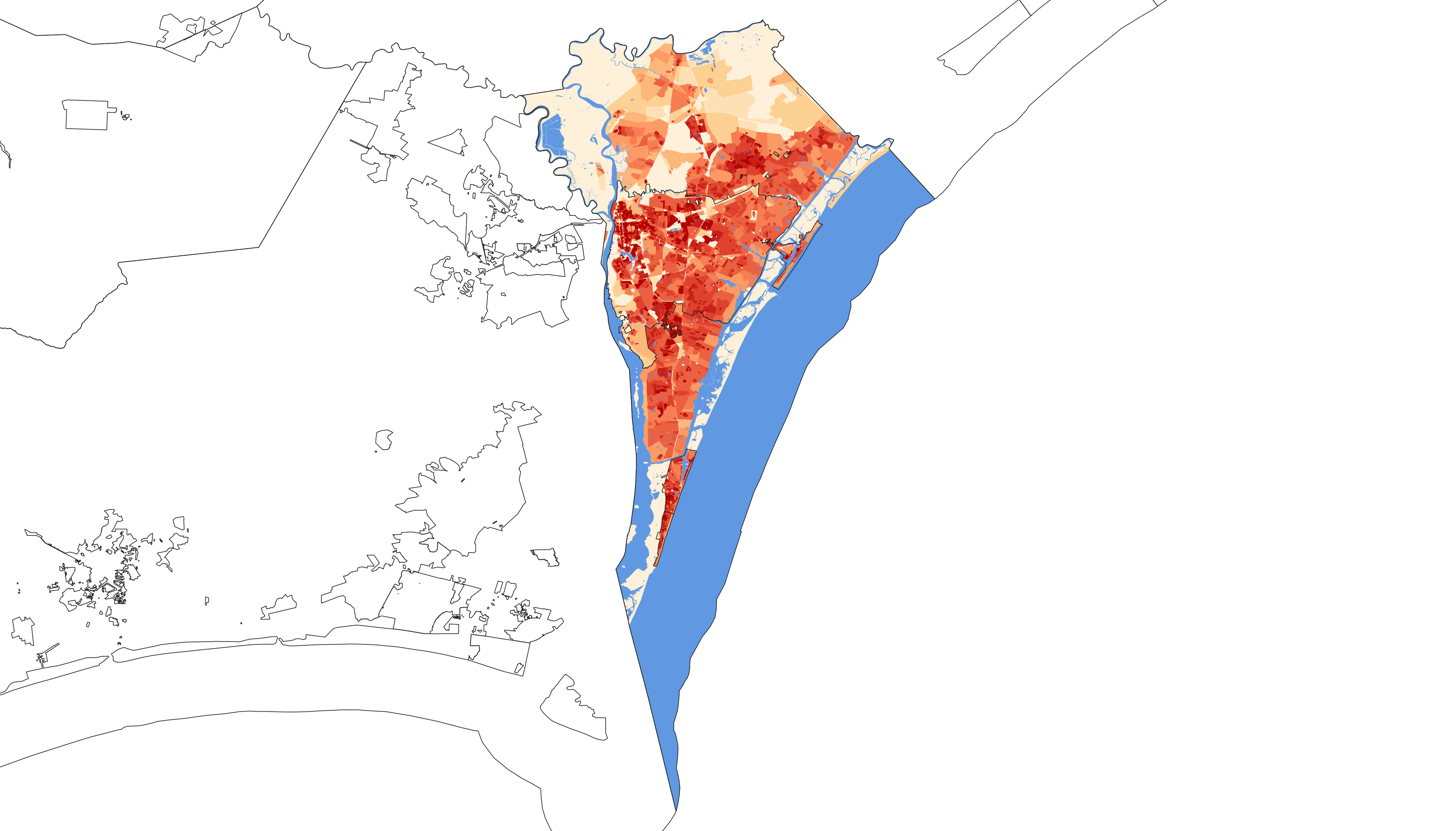
2020 population density of New Hanover County NC by census block

=== 2020 census ===
New Hanover County, North Carolina – Racial and ethnic composition Note: the US Census treats Hispanic/Latino as an ethnic category. This table excludes Latinos from the racial categories and assigns them to a separate category. Hispanics/Latinos may be of any race.
Race / Ethnicity (NH = Non-Hispanic)	Pop 1980	Pop 1990	Pop 2000	Pop 2010	Pop 2020	% 1980	% 1990	% 2000	% 2010	% 2020
White alone (NH)	79,862	94,288	126,453	155,631	167,150	77.18%	78.39%	78.88%	76.79%	74.06%
Black or African American alone (NH)	22,192	23,983	27,001	29,469	26,974	21.45%	19.94%	16.84%	14.54%	11.95%
Native American or Alaska Native alone (NH)	260	426	581	798	678	0.25%	0.35%	0.36%	0.39%	0.30%
Asian alone (NH)	311	612	1,325	2,380	3,468	0.30%	0.51%	0.83%	1.17%	1.54%
Native Hawaiian or Pacific Islander alone (NH)	x	x	88	108	148	x	x	0.05%	0.05%	0.07%
Other race alone (NH)	67	51	187	353	992	0.06%	0.04%	0.12%	0.17%	0.44%
Mixed race or Multiracial (NH)	x	x	1,396	3,212	8,992	x	x	0.87%	1.58%	3.98%
Hispanic or Latino (any race)	779	924	3,276	10,716	17,300	0.75%	0.77%	2.04%	5.29%	7.66%
Total	103,471	120,284	160,307	202,667	225,702	100.00%	100.00%	100.00%	100.00%	100.00%

As of the 2020 census, there were 225,702 people, 98,109 households, and 56,160 families residing in the county.

The median age was 40.6 years. 18.4% of residents were under the age of 18 and 19.4% of residents were 65 years of age or older. For every 100 females there were 91.3 males, and for every 100 females age 18 and over there were 88.5 males age 18 and over.

The racial makeup of the county was 75.7% White, 12.1% Black or African American, 0.5% American Indian and Alaska Native, 1.6% Asian, 0.1% Native Hawaiian and Pacific Islander, 3.6% from some other race, and 6.5% from two or more races. Hispanic or Latino residents of any race comprised 7.7% of the population.

98.3% of residents lived in urban areas, while 1.7% lived in rural areas.

There were 98,109 households in the county, of which 24.1% had children under the age of 18 living in them. Of all households, 41.9% were married-couple households, 19.6% were households with a male householder and no spouse or partner present, and 31.0% were households with a female householder and no spouse or partner present. About 31.9% of all households were made up of individuals and 12.3% had someone living alone who was 65 years of age or older.

There were 113,368 housing units, of which 13.5% were vacant. Among occupied housing units, 60.1% were owner-occupied and 39.9% were renter-occupied. The homeowner vacancy rate was 1.9% and the rental vacancy rate was 11.1%.

=== 2000 census ===
At the 2000 census, there were 160,307 people, 68,183 households, and 41,591 families residing in the county. The population density was 806 people per square mile (311 people/km^{2}). There were 79,616 housing units at an average density of 400 units per square mile (150 units/km^{2}). The racial makeup of the county was 79.91% White, 16.97% Black or African American, 0.39% Native American, 0.83% Asian, 0.06% Pacific Islander, 0.79% from other races, and 1.05% from two or more races. 2.04% of the population were Hispanic or Latino of any race. 14.3% were of English, 13.0% United States or American, 10.6% German and 10.2% Irish ancestry according to Census 2000.

There were 68,183 households, out of which 26.10% had children under the age of 18 living with them, 46.50% were married couples living together, 11.50% had a female householder with no husband present, and 39.00% were non-families. 28.90% of all households were made up of individuals, and 8.50% had someone living alone who was 65 years of age or older. The average household size were 2.29 and the average family size was 2.83.

In the county, the population was spread out, with 21.00% under the age of 18, 12.00% from 18 to 24, 30.50% from 25 to 44, 23.70% from 45 to 64, and 12.80% who were 65 years of age or older. The median age was 36 years. For every 100 females there were 93.30 males. For every 100 females age 18 and over, there were 90.70 males.

The median income for a household in the county was $40,172, and the median income for a family was $50,861. Males had a median income of $35,801 versus $25,305 for females. The per capita income for the county was $23,123. About 8.30% of families and 13.10% of the population were below the poverty line, including 15.70% of those under age 18 and 9.00% of those age 65 or over.

== Government and politics ==
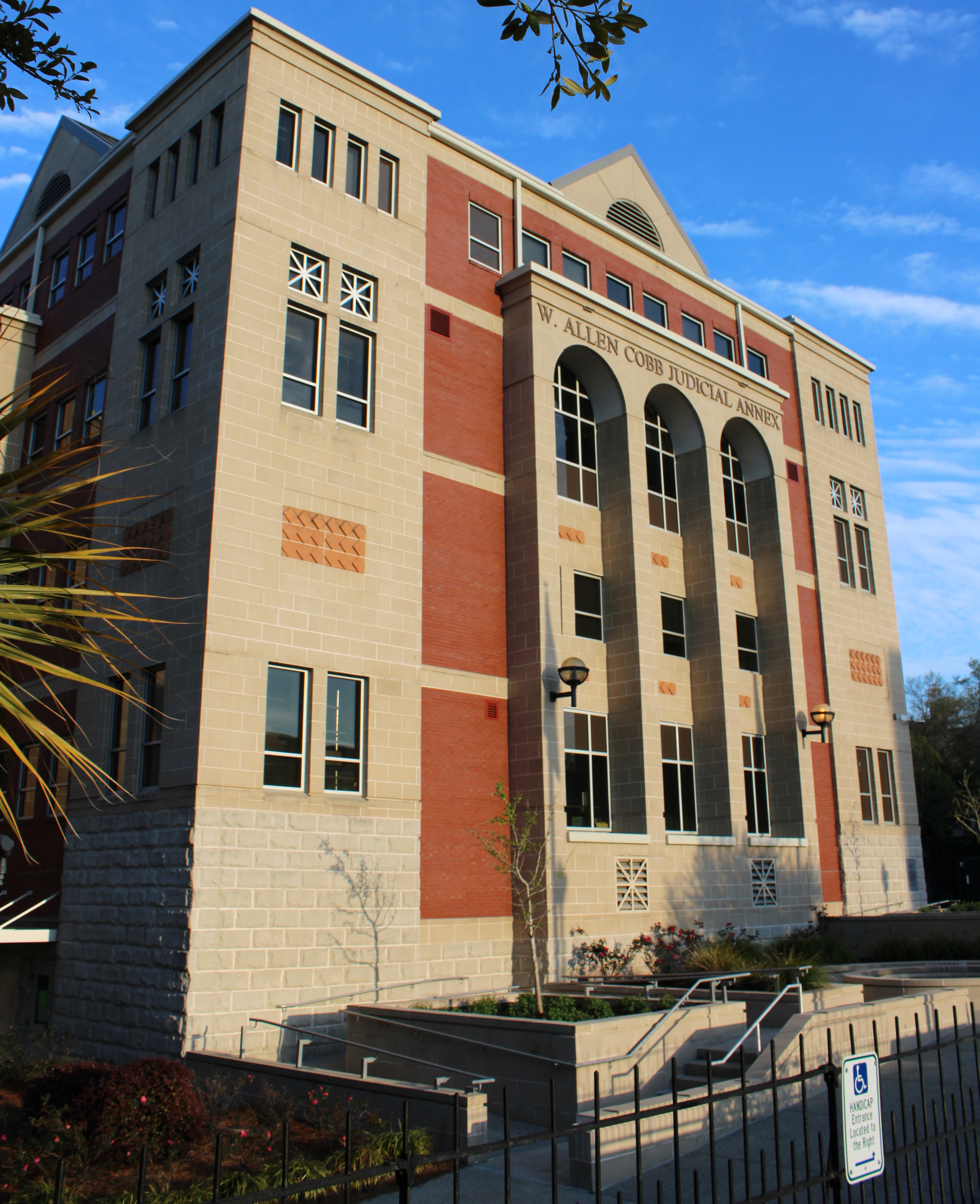
W. Allen Cobb Judicial Annex in Wilmington

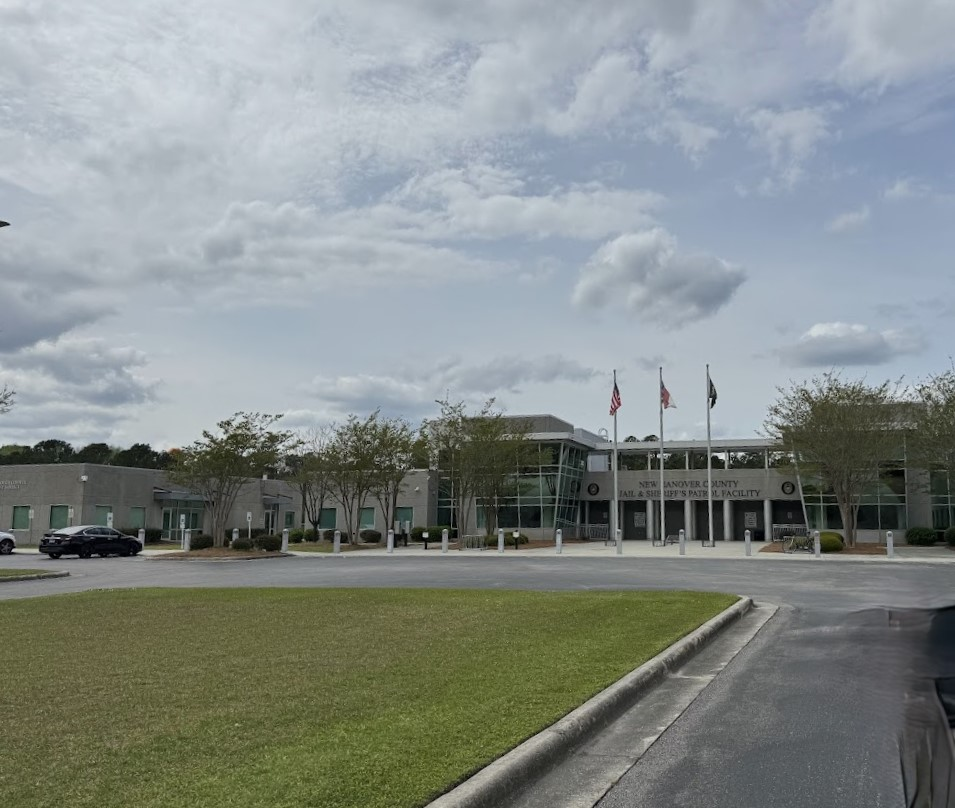
New Hanover County Jail and Sheriff's Office in unincorporated Castle Hayne

New Hanover County is governed by a county commission. The commission comprises five members elected at-large in four-year staggered terms. The body elects its own chairman and vice-chairman. It sets policy for county administration within the confines of state law, adopts local ordinances, appoints advisory committees, and enacts an annual county budget.

New Hanover County is represented in the U.S. House of Representatives by Republican David Rouzer, who is the representative for North Carolina's 7th congressional district. From 2013 to 2017, a portion of northwestern and central New Hanover County was redistricted to North Carolina's 3rd congressional district, which was represented by Republican Walter B. Jones Jr. before his death. The county is also in the 7th and 8th districts of the North Carolina Senate, represented by Republicans Michael V. Lee and Bill Rabon, respectively; and the 18th, 19th, and 20th districts of the North Carolina House of Representatives, represented by two Republicans and one Democrat. Judicially, New Hanover County is in the 6th prosecutorial district, represented on the superior court by two Republican judges and one Democratic judge, as well as on the district court by five Democratic judges and four Republican judges.

New Hanover County is a member of the regional Cape Fear Council of Governments.

New Hanover County Sheriff's Office (NHCSO) serves as the county's primary law enforcement agency. NHCSO is responsible for patrolling the county (primarily outside the Wilmington city limits), staffing the juvenile and adult correctional facilities, and proving court security for the W. Allen Cobb Judicial Annex in Wilmington.

New Hanover County is governed by a board of commissioners and has several elected office positions. The board of commissioners is elected at-large, with the top vote-getters obtaining seats.

Office	Name	Party
Clerk of Superior Court	Jan Kennedy	Republican
Register of Deeds	Morghan Collin	Republican
District Attorney	Jason Smith	Republican
Sheriff	Ed McMahon	Republican

Office	Name	Party
Commissioner	Bill Rivenbark	Republican
Commissioner	LeAnne Pierce	Republican
Commissioner	Dane Scalise	Republican
Commissioner	Stephanie Walker	Democrat
Commissioner	Rob Zapple	Democrat

=== Politics ===
Since formation, New Hanover and the surrounding Cape Fear region were some of the few Republican holdouts in North Carolina, largely attributed to its larger-than-average African-American population, which voted Republican at the time. Wilmington was then home to a Fusionist coalition of African-Americans and White Republicans, which gained control of the city in 1898. Following this event, a white mob overthrew the government, banishing Republicans and African-Americans from the city in what would later be known as the Wilmington massacre. This began an immediate political realignment, with Democrats jumping from less than 40% of the vote to nearly 100% of the vote in one election cycle.

This continued throughout the 20th century, with Democrats maintaining a tight hold on the county for over 60 years (aside from Herbert Hoover's victory in 1928, when the heavily anti-Catholic Outer Banks region cast its votes against Catholic Al Smith). In the mid-20th century, New Hanover County began shifting back towards Republicans at a faster rate than other majority-White southern counties due to its massive population increase and importance as an industrial center during World War II, and had become a swing county by the 1950s. It began to follow the shift of other southern counties, with African-Americans moving to the Democratic Party and Whites moving to the Republican Party, although its rapid growth throughout the century means it never became as solidly Republican as other rural southern counties.

Modern New Hanover County is politically competitive, and the margin of victory for either party has not gone past 5% in over 20 years. The rapid growth of Wilmington due to its burgeoning film industry and college population has shifted the county to the left in recent years, though Republicans still tend to perform better in local contests.

In 2020, Joe Biden became the first Democrat to carry the county in 44 years, also becoming the first Democrat ever to win the county but lose the state. In 2024, despite her majority being reduced to a narrow plurality, Kamala Harris became the first Democratic presidential nominee to win the county yet lose the presidential election since 1956.

United States presidential election results for New Hanover County, North Carolina
Year	Republican		Democratic		Third party(ies)	
Year	No.	%	No.	%	No.	%
1880	2,200	55.88%	1,438	36.53%	299	7.59%
1884	2,894	62.38%	1,745	37.62%	0	0.00%
1888	2,856	60.43%	1,870	39.57%	0	0.00%
1892	1,500	38.01%	2,408	61.02%	38	0.96%
1896	3,183	58.17%	2,100	38.38%	189	3.45%
1900	60	2.60%	2,247	97.40%	0	0.00%
1904	91	6.77%	1,254	93.23%	0	0.00%
1908	511	21.58%	1,857	78.42%	0	0.00%
1912	140	6.17%	2,021	89.11%	107	4.72%
1916	492	17.28%	2,355	82.72%	0	0.00%
1920	712	14.79%	4,102	85.21%	0	0.00%
1924	1,190	18.80%	4,735	74.80%	405	6.40%
1928	4,248	60.62%	2,760	39.38%	0	0.00%
1932	1,430	18.81%	6,030	79.33%	141	1.86%
1936	1,306	15.04%	7,379	84.96%	0	0.00%
1940	1,635	15.97%	8,600	84.03%	0	0.00%
1944	2,829	23.01%	9,467	76.99%	0	0.00%
1948	3,162	28.25%	5,364	47.92%	2,667	23.83%
1952	9,330	47.46%	10,330	52.54%	0	0.00%
1956	9,470	48.03%	10,247	51.97%	0	0.00%
1960	9,775	42.58%	13,182	57.42%	0	0.00%
1964	12,140	49.10%	12,584	50.90%	0	0.00%
1968	10,020	37.03%	7,750	28.64%	9,291	34.33%
1972	19,060	74.41%	5,894	23.01%	661	2.58%
1976	13,687	48.06%	14,504	50.93%	286	1.00%
1980	17,243	53.48%	13,670	42.40%	1,331	4.13%
1984	23,771	65.21%	12,591	34.54%	90	0.25%
1988	23,807	60.56%	15,401	39.18%	105	0.27%
1992	24,338	46.67%	20,291	38.91%	7,525	14.43%
1996	27,889	50.92%	22,839	41.70%	4,041	7.38%
2000	36,503	55.04%	29,292	44.17%	524	0.79%
2004	45,351	55.82%	35,572	43.78%	324	0.40%
2008	50,544	50.21%	49,145	48.82%	976	0.97%
2012	53,385	51.52%	48,668	46.96%	1,575	1.52%
2016	55,344	49.46%	50,979	45.56%	5,582	4.99%
2020	63,331	48.04%	66,138	50.17%	2,361	1.79%
2024	67,949	48.98%	68,814	49.60%	1,971	1.42%

== Education ==
The county is served by New Hanover County Schools, which are governed by an elected county board of education. There are also several private schools and a catholic school.

Office	Name	Party
Board member	Melissa Mason	Republican
Board member	Josie Barnhart	Republican
Board member	Pat Bradford	Republican
Board member	Pete Wildeboer	Republican
Board member	David Perry	Republican
Board member	Judy Justice	Democrat
Board member	Tim Merrick	Democrat

There is additionally a branch of the University of North Carolina at University of North Carolina Wilmington, as well as several small technical colleges and Cape Fear Community College.

== Healthcare ==
New Hanover Regional Medical Center is a hospital in Wilmington. It was established in 1967 as a public hospital, and it was the first hospital in the city to admit patients of all races. It was operated by New Hanover County. In February 2021 Novant Health, a nonprofit private organization, acquired the hospital.

== Communities ==
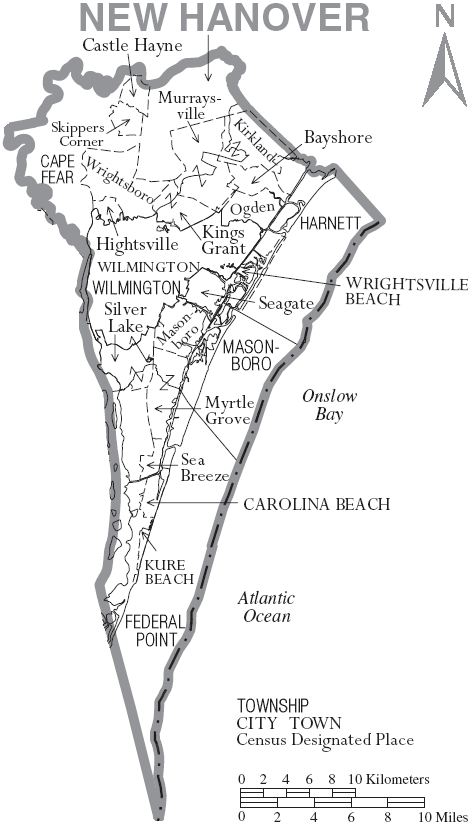
Map of New Hanover County with municipal and township labels

=== City ===
- Wilmington (county seat and largest community)

=== Towns ===
- Carolina Beach
- Kure Beach
- Wrightsville Beach

=== Townships ===
- Cape Fear
- Federal Point
- Harnett
- Masonboro
- Wilmington

=== Census-designated places ===
- Bayshore
- Blue Clay Farms
- Castle Hayne
- Hightsville
- Kings Grant
- Murraysville
- Myrtle Grove
- Northchase
- Ogden
- Porters Neck
- Sea Breeze
- Silver Lake
- Skippers Corner
- Wrightsboro

=== Unincorporated communities ===
- Monkey Junction

=== Former communities ===
- Kirkland
- Masonboro
- Seagate
- Wilmington Beach

== Notable people ==
- Michael Jordan, NBA player
- Meadowlark Lemon, NBA player for the Harlem Globetrotters

== See also ==
- List of counties in North Carolina
- National Register of Historic Places listings in New Hanover County, North Carolina
- Films and television shows produced in Wilmington, North Carolina
- Federal Point Light, deactivated lighthouse that used to be located at Fort Fisher
- Frying Pan Shoals Light, old lighthouse south of Fort Fisher
- GenX, chemical compound found in the Cape Fear River, south of Fayetteville

== Works cited ==
- Evans, William McKee (1995) [1966]. Ballots and Fence Rails: Reconstruction on the Lower Cape Fear (reprint ed.). Athens: University of Georgia Press. ISBN 0-8203-1731-4.
