= Hampstead Bypass =

The name Hampstead Bypass refers to two bypasses in the United States:

- A portion of Maryland Route 30 around Hampstead, Maryland
- A planned route in the U.S. state of North Carolina, serving as a bypass of Ogden and Hampstead along U.S. Route 17
