= USS Carolina =

USS Carolina may refer to:

- USS Carolina (1812), a schooner that played an important role in the Battle of New Orleans
- USS Carolina (1906), a U.S. Coast Guard vessel automatically commissioned into the U.S. Navy during World War I

== See also ==
- USS Caroline
- USS North Carolina
- USS South Carolina
