= Cape Fear Public Transportation Authority =

Public transportation operator in North Carolina, US

Wave Transit
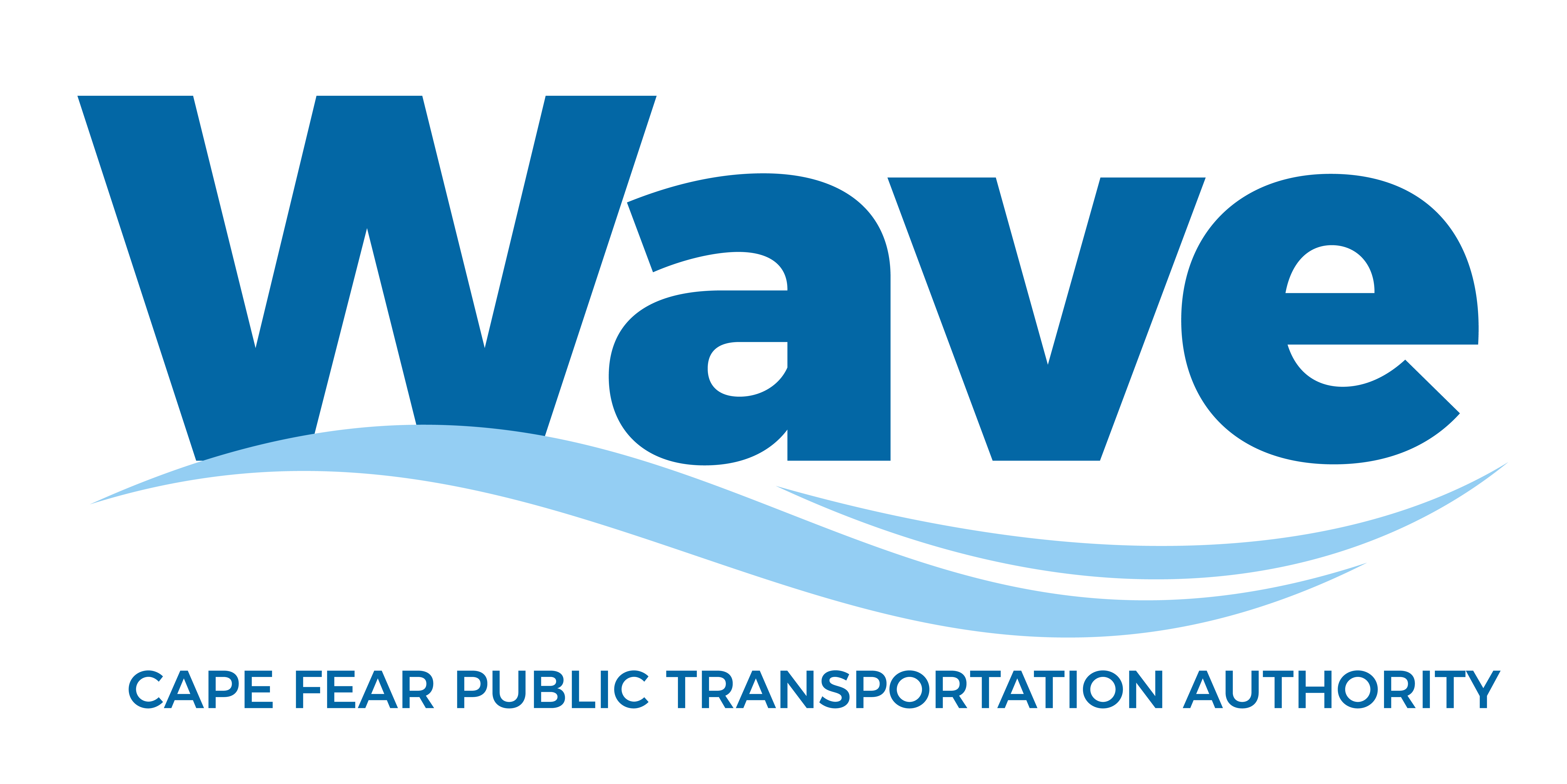

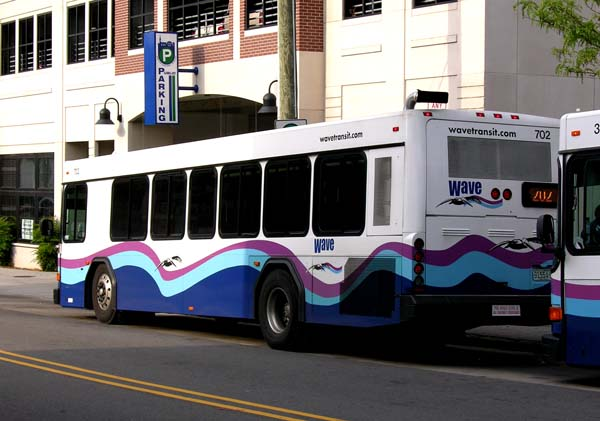
- Founded: 1974
- Headquarters: 505 Cando Street
- Locale: Wilmington, North Carolina
- Service area: New Hanover County, North Carolina
- Service type: Bus service
- Routes: 12 fixed routes, 8 university routes, and 4 microtransit zones
- Stops: 358
- Destinations: Downtown Wilimington, Monkey Junction, Carolina Beach, Kure Beach, Myrtle Grove, Wrighstboro, Murrayville, Ogden, Leland, Navassa, Belville,
- Hubs: Forden Station 505 Cando St. Wilmington, NC 28405 Padgett Station 520 North 3rd St. Wilmington, NC 28401
- Stations: 2
- Depots: 1
- Fleet: 66
- Annual ridership: 550,000
- Fuel type: Compressed Natural Gas (CNG)
- Chief executive: Marie Parker, Executive Director
- Website: wavetransit.com

The Cape Fear Public Transportation Authority, operating as Wave Transit, is the public transportation operator for the metro area of Wilmington, North Carolina. Sixteen regular routes are provided, with all but one running seven days per week. A free downtown shuttle also runs using road trolleys.

== Route list ==
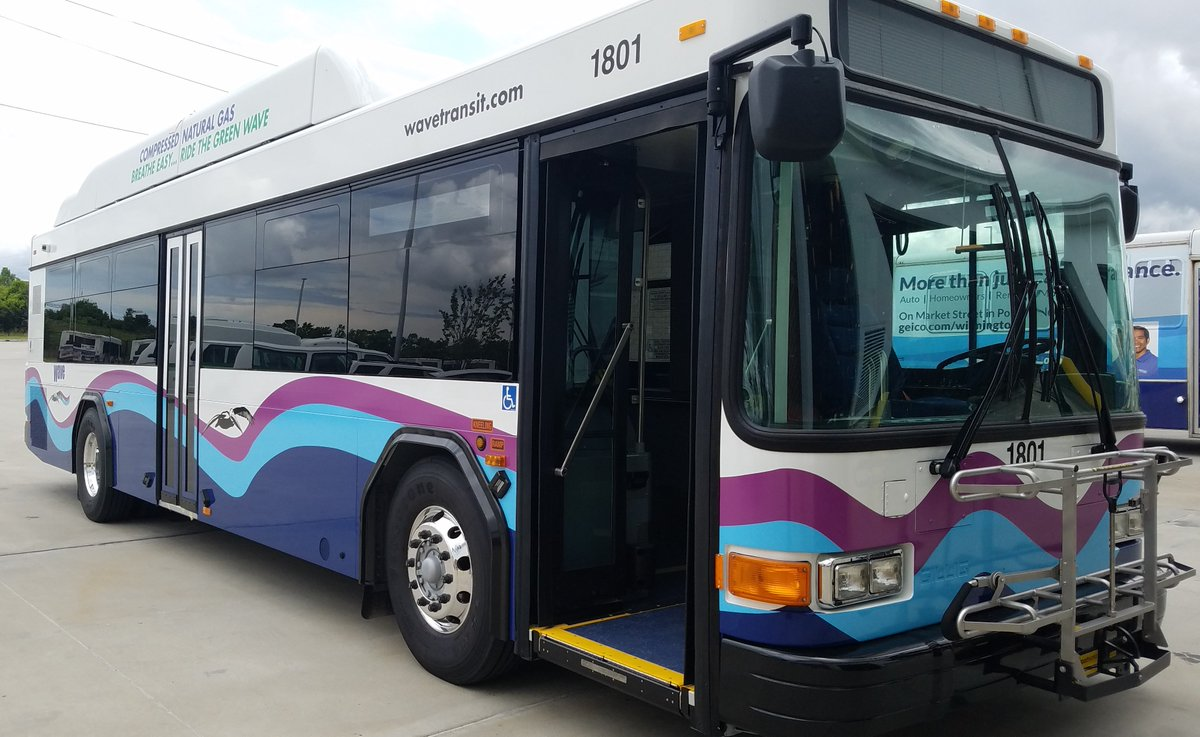
Wave Transit CNG Bus

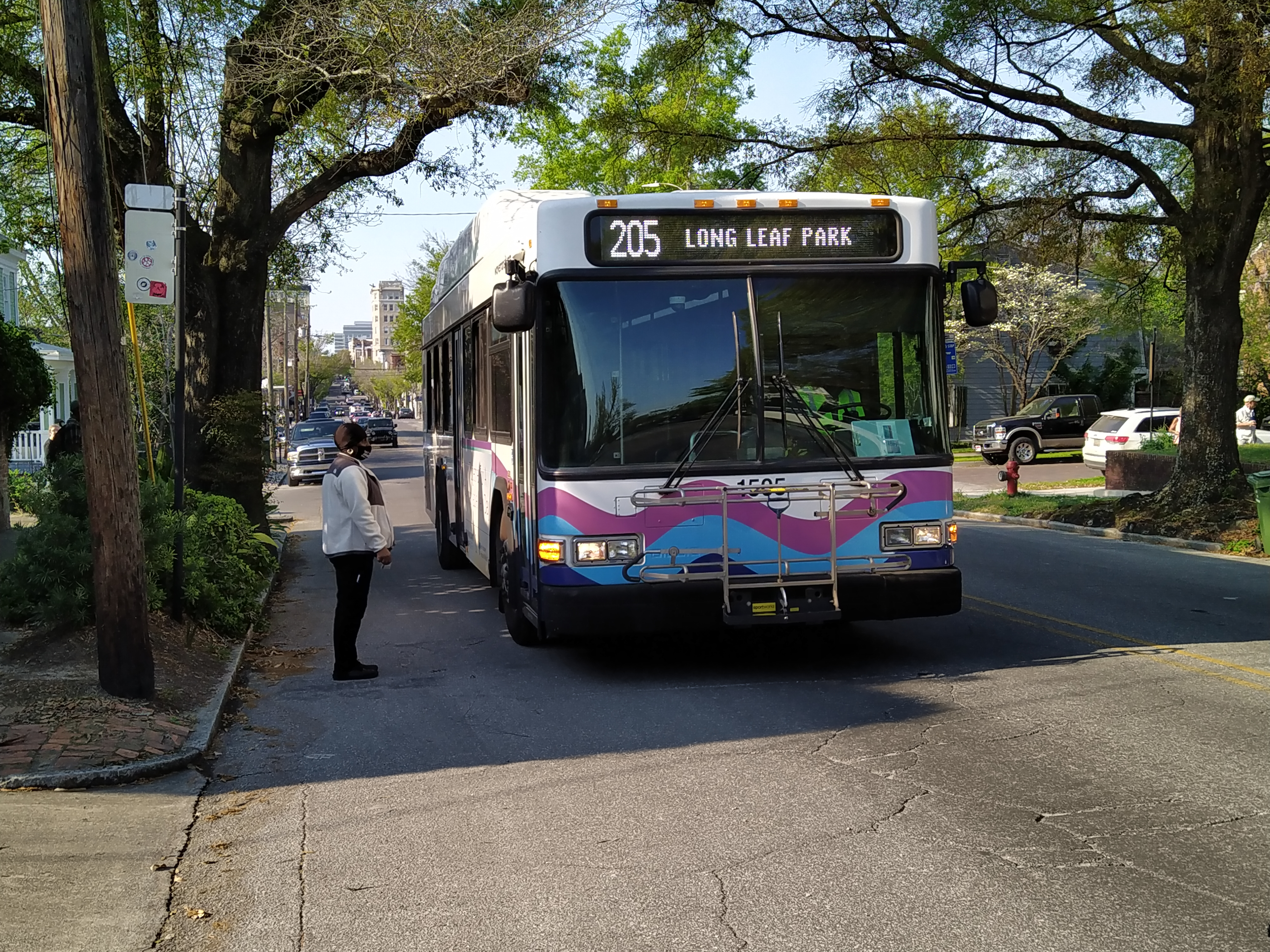
Route 205 boarding a passenger on South Front Street in April 2021.

Fixed Route:

Route 101	Princess Place
Route 103	Oleander East
Route 104	Northeast
Route 105	Medical Center
Route 106	Shipyard Blvd.
Route 107	College Rd.
Route 108	Market St.
Route 201	Carolina Beach Rd.
Route 202	Oleander West
Route 205	Longleaf Park
Route 210	South 17th St.

Seahawk Shuttle:

704 Yellow Route - every 20 minutes

711 Grey Route - every 20 minutes

707 Red Express Route - every 20 minutes

Port City Trolley:

Route 203 - every 40 minutes

RideMICRO:

Brunswick-Downtown Connector - on-demand

Pender - New Hanover Connector - on-demand

Southern New Hanover County - on-demand

Northern New Hanover County - on-demand

== Stations ==
=== Forden Station ===
Forden Station
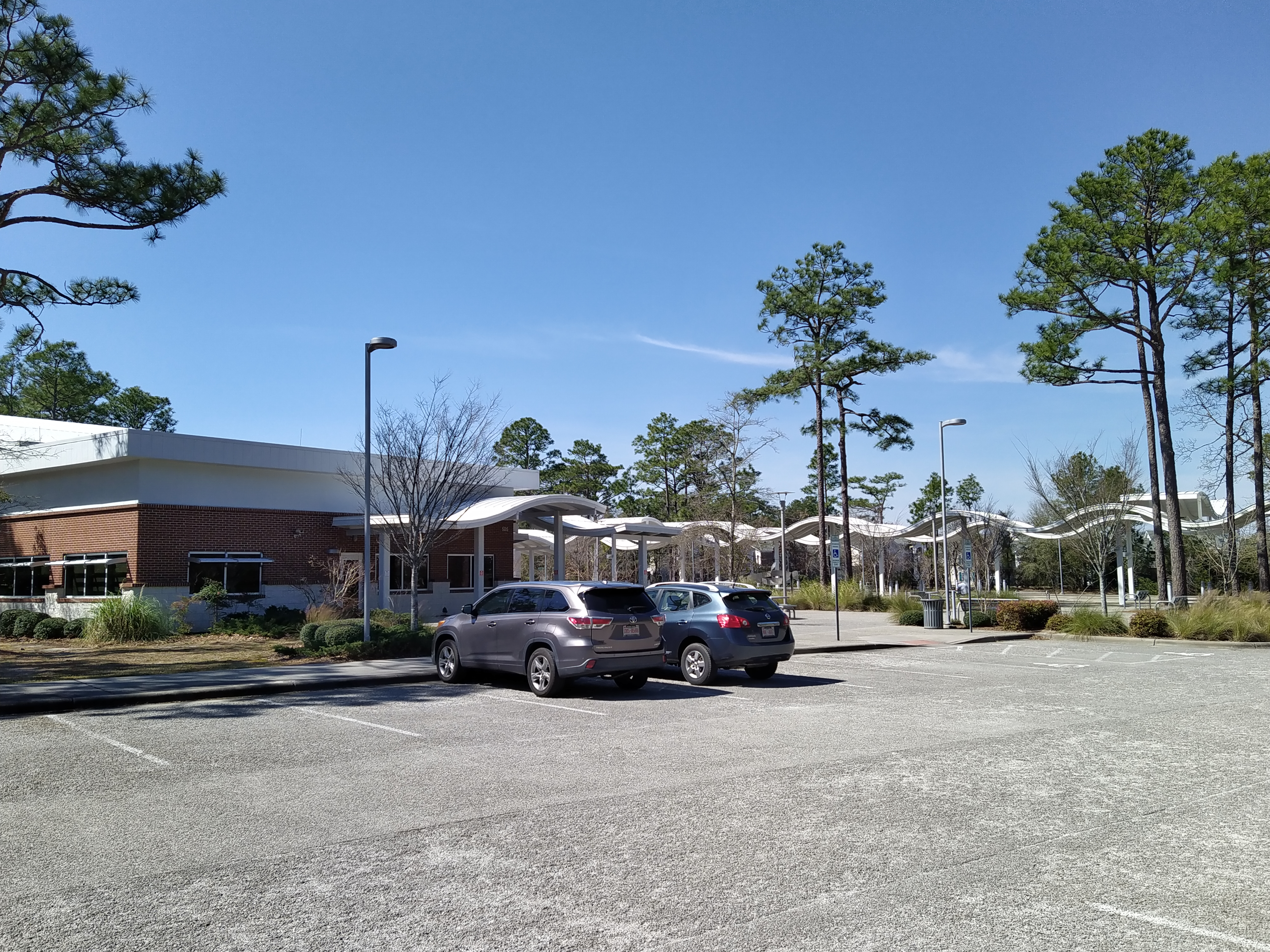

General information
- Location: 505 Cando Street; Wilmington, North Carolina; United States
- Coordinates: 34.25113°N 77.87494°W
- Bus operators: Wave
- Connections: Amtrak Thruway; Greyhound Lines

Construction
- Structure type: At-grade
- Accessible: Yes

Other information
- Station code: Amtrak: WMN

History
- Opened: April 18, 2011
Location

Forden Station is a bus station located in Wilmington's North College neighborhood and serves as a bus terminus for the Cape Fear Public Transportation Authority (Wave) and provides intercity bus service via Amtrak Thruway and Greyhound Lines. At an estimated cost of $5.4 million, the facility opened on April 18, 2011.

=== Padgett Station ===
Padgett Station
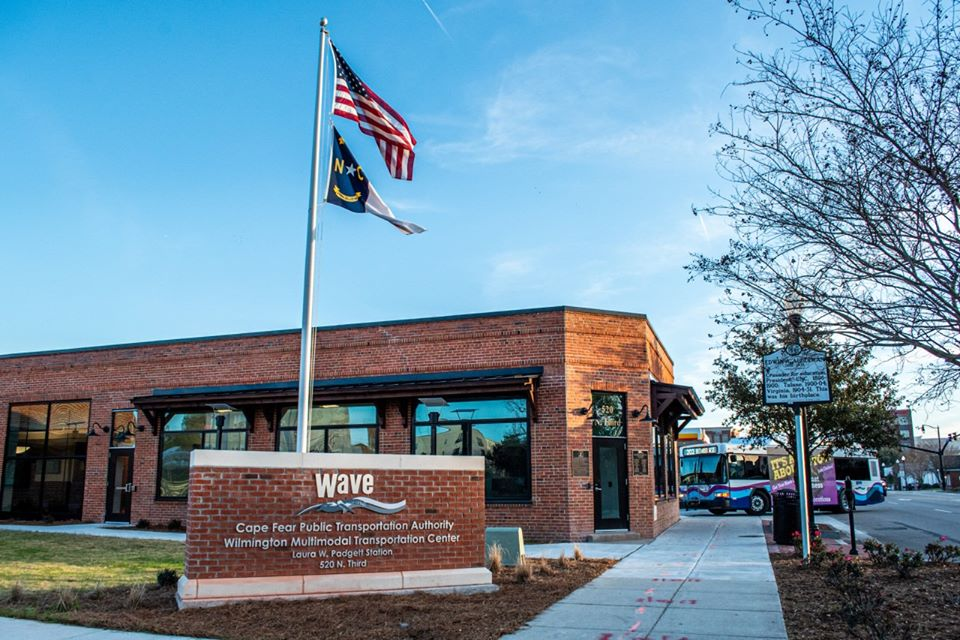

General information
- Location: 520 North 3rd Street; Wilmington, North Carolina; United States
- Coordinates: 34.24209°N 77.94643°W
- Bus operators: Wave

Construction
- Structure type: At-grade
- Accessible: Yes

History
- Opened: January 18, 2020
Location

Padgett Station is a multimodal transit facility that located in Wilmington's Upper Downtown neighborhood at 520 North 3rd St, and serves as a bus terminus for the Cape Fear Public Transportation Authority (Wave). Named after former Wilmington City Council member Laura W. Padgett, it was opened on January 18, 2020.
