= Bayshore, North Carolina =

- CDP
- Location in New Hanover County and the state of North Carolina.
- Coordinates: 34°17′21″N 77°48′09″W
- Country: United States
- State: North Carolina
- County: New Hanover

Area
  - Total: 2.41 sq mi (6.25 km^{2})
  - Land: 2.36 sq mi (6.10 km^{2})
  - Water: 0.058 sq mi (0.15 km^{2})
- Elevation: 30 ft (9.1 m)

Population (2020)
  - Total: 3,833
  - Density: 1,627.6/sq mi (628.41/km^{2})
- Time zone: UTC-5 (Eastern (EST))
  - Summer (DST): UTC-4 (EDT)
- ZIP code: 28411
- Area codes: 910, 472
- FIPS code: 37-04015
- GNIS feature ID: 2402672

Bayshore is a census-designated place (CDP) in New Hanover County, North Carolina, United States. The population was 3,833 at the 2020 census up from 3,393 in 2010. Bayshore is located in the statistical township of Harnett. The CDP is part of the Wilmington Metropolitan Statistical Area. Bayshore was first listed as a CDP at the 1990 United States census.

== Geography ==
According to the United States Census Bureau, the CDP has a total area of 3.7 square miles (9.6 km^{2}), of which 3.6 square miles (9.3 km^{2}) is land and 0.1 square miles (0.26 km^{2}) (2.72%) is water.

== Demographics ==
Historical population
Census	Pop.	Note	%±
1990	1,661		—
2000	2,512		51.2%
2010	3,393		35.1%
2020	3,833		13.0%
U.S. Decennial Census

=== 2020 census ===
As of the 2020 census, Bayshore had a population of 3,833. The median age was 39.7 years. 23.7% of residents were under the age of 18 and 15.8% of residents were 65 years of age or older. For every 100 females there were 93.4 males, and for every 100 females age 18 and over there were 92.4 males age 18 and over.

100.0% of residents lived in urban areas, while 0.0% lived in rural areas.

There were 1,493 households in Bayshore, of which 36.0% had children under the age of 18 living in them. Of all households, 59.7% were married-couple households, 11.5% were households with a male householder and no spouse or partner present, and 22.2% were households with a female householder and no spouse or partner present. About 20.9% of all households were made up of individuals and 8.7% had someone living alone who was 65 years of age or older.

There were 1,583 housing units, of which 5.7% were vacant. The homeowner vacancy rate was 1.3% and the rental vacancy rate was 8.3%.

Racial composition as of the 2020 census
Race	Number	Percent
White	3,365	87.8%
Black or African American	90	2.3%
American Indian and Alaska Native	14	0.4%
Asian	53	1.4%
Native Hawaiian and Other Pacific Islander	4	0.1%
Some other race	127	3.3%
Two or more races	180	4.7%
Hispanic or Latino (of any race)	240	6.3%

=== 2000 census ===
As of the census of 2000, there were 2,512 people, 967 households, and 772 families residing in the CDP. The population density was 700.4 inhabitants per square mile (270.4/km^{2}). There were 1,058 housing units at an average density of 295.0 per square mile (113.9/km^{2}). The racial makeup of the CDP was 96.54% White, 1.91% African American, 0.32% Native American, 0.56% Asian, 0.04% Pacific Islander, 0.20% from other races, and 0.44% from two or more races. Hispanic or Latino of any race were 1.04% of the population.

There were 967 households, out of which 35.7% had children under the age of 18 living with them, 72.6% were married couples living together, 5.1% had a female householder with no husband present, and 20.1% were non-families. 16.5% of all households were made up of individuals, and 4.8% had someone living alone who was 65 years of age or older. The average household size was 2.60 and the average family size was 2.92.

In the CDP, the population was spread out, with 25.2% under the age of 18, 4.3% from 18 to 24, 31.1% from 25 to 44, 31.0% from 45 to 64, and 8.5% who were 65 years of age or older. The median age was 40 years. For every 100 females, there were 100.5 males. For every 100 females age 18 and over, there were 96.3 males.

The median income for a household in the CDP was $63,869, and the median income for a family was $71,815. Males had a median income of $49,286 versus $32,442 for females. The per capita income for the CDP was $24,837. About 1.9% of families and 2.0% of the population were below the poverty line, including 1.0% of those under age 18 and 2.5% of those age 65 or over.
