= Harnett Township, North Carolina =

Township in New Hanover County, North Carolina

Coordinates: 34.280°N 77.782°W

Harnet Township, North Carolina, is a statistical township consisting of all Wrightsville Beach, Bayshore, and Ogden. Harnet Township also contains parts of Kings Grant, Kirkland, Murraysville, and Wilmington. Harnet Township is located in New Hanover County, North, Carolina.

== Demographics ==
Historical population
Census	Pop.	Note	%±
1970	17,427		—
1980	26,986		54.9%
1990	29,221		8.3%
2000	30,869		5.6%
2010	37,561		21.7%
2020	43,171		14.9%
