= Kings Grant, North Carolina =

- CDP
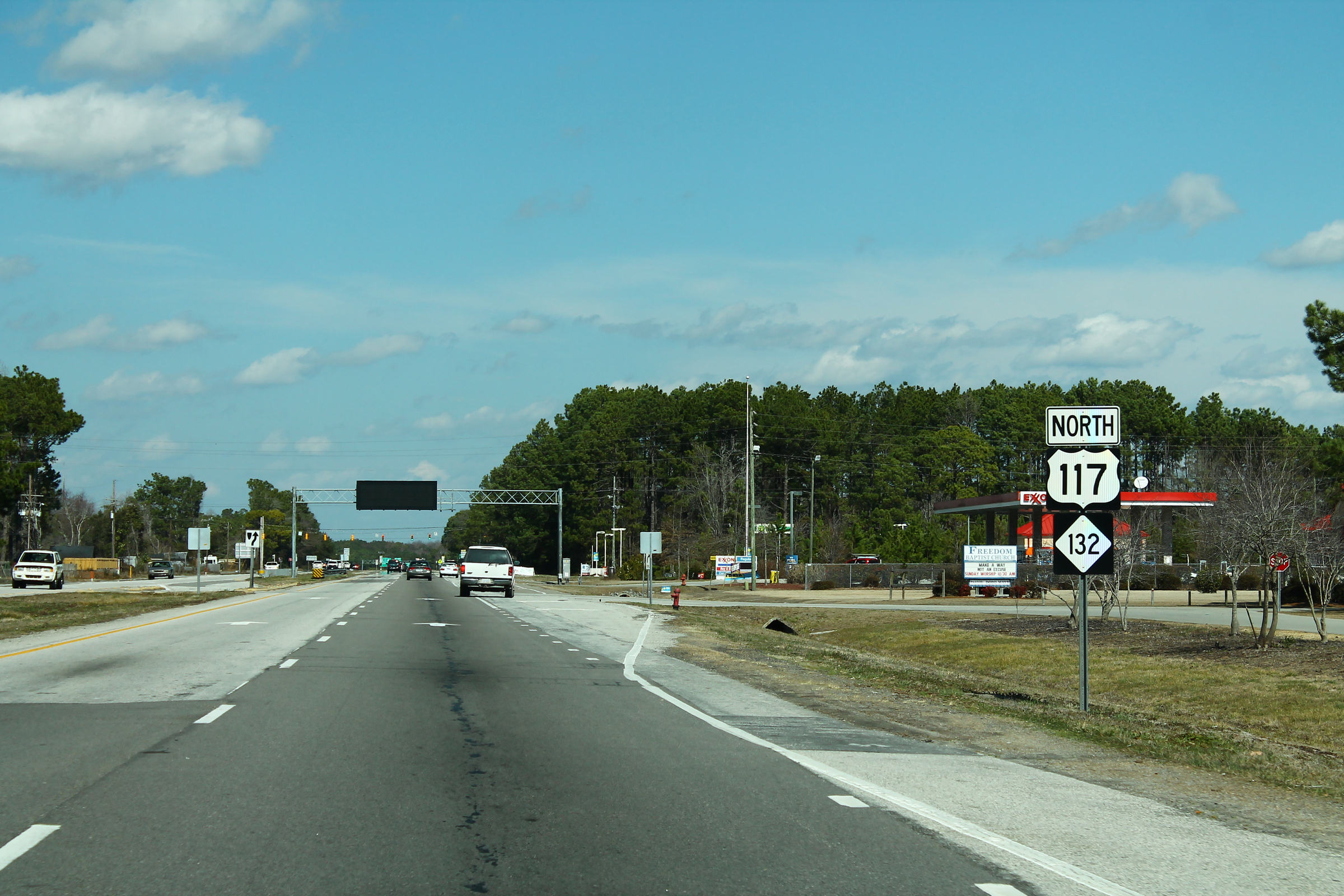
- Northbound College Road (NC 132/US 117) passing through Kings Grant; a half mile (0.8 km) beyond lies the eastern terminus of Interstate 40

- Location in New Hanover County and the state of North Carolina.
- Coordinates: 34°15′59″N 77°51′57″W
- Country: United States
- State: North Carolina
- County: New Hanover

Area
  - Total: 4.56 sq mi (11.80 km^{2})
  - Land: 4.54 sq mi (11.76 km^{2})
  - Water: 0.019 sq mi (0.05 km^{2})
- Elevation: 23 ft (7.0 m)

Population (2020)
  - Total: 8,466
  - Density: 1,864.9/sq mi (720.04/km^{2})
- Time zone: UTC-5 (Eastern (EST))
  - Summer (DST): UTC-4 (EDT)
- ZIP code: 28405
- Area codes: 910, 472
- FIPS code: 37-35870
- GNIS feature ID: 2403177

Kings Grant is a census-designated place (CDP) in New Hanover County, North Carolina, United States. The population was 8,466 at the 2020 census, up from 8,113 in 2010. It is part of the Wilmington Metropolitan Statistical Area. Kings Grant is located in the statistical townships of Cape Fear and Harnett. Kings Grant was listed under the name Smith Creek in the 1990 census, but the CDP was relisted as Kings Grant by the 2000 census. Kings Grant was first listed as a CDP at the 1980 United States census.

== Geography ==
According to the United States Census Bureau, the CDP has a total area of 4.6 square miles (12 km^{2}), all land.

== Demographics ==
Historical population
Census	Pop.	Note	%±
1980	6,562		—
1990	7,461		13.7%
2000	7,738		3.7%
2010	8,113		4.8%
2020	8,466		4.4%
U.S. Decennial Census

=== 2020 census ===
As of the 2020 census, Kings Grant had a population of 8,466. There were 3,470 households and 2,276 families. The median age was 39.4 years. About 20.2% of residents were under the age of 18 and 17.6% were 65 years of age or older. For every 100 females, there were 99.3 males, and for every 100 females age 18 and over, there were 97.8 males age 18 and over.

100.0% of residents lived in urban areas, while 0.0% lived in rural areas.

Of the 3,470 households, 26.6% had children under the age of 18 living in them. Of all households, 45.7% were married-couple households, 19.5% were households with a male householder and no spouse or partner present, and 26.8% were households with a female householder and no spouse or partner present. About 25.6% of all households were made up of individuals, and 9.9% had someone living alone who was 65 years of age or older.

There were 3,705 housing units, of which 6.3% were vacant. The homeowner vacancy rate was 2.0%, and the rental vacancy rate was 7.4%.

Kings Grant racial composition
Race	Number	Percentage
White (non-Hispanic)	5,757	68.0%
Black or African American (non-Hispanic)	964	11.39%
Native American	34	0.4%
Asian	191	2.26%
Pacific Islander	6	0.07%
Other/Mixed	365	4.31%
Hispanic or Latino	1,149	13.57%

=== 2000 census ===
As of the census of 2000, there were 7,738 people, 3,011 households, and 2,185 families residing in the CDP. The population density was 1,669.9 inhabitants per square mile (644.8/km^{2}). There were 3,152 housing units at an average density of 680.2 per square mile (262.6/km^{2}). The racial makeup of the CDP was 84.34% White, 12.26% African American, 0.52% Native American, 0.94% Asian, 0.04% Pacific Islander, 0.80% from other races, and 1.10% from two or more races. Hispanic or Latino of any race were 1.73% of the population.

There were 3,011 households, out of which 32.8% had children under the age of 18 living with them, 58.5% were married couples living together, 10.5% had a female householder with no husband present, and 27.4% were non-families. 18.8% of all households were made up of individuals, and 4.3% had someone living alone who was 65 years of age or older. The average household size was 2.56 and the average family size was 2.92.

In the CDP, the population was spread out, with 23.6% under the age of 18, 9.2% from 18 to 24, 33.1% from 25 to 44, 25.1% from 45 to 64, and 9.0% who were 65 years of age or older. The median age was 36 years. For every 100 females, there were 99.4 males. For every 100 females age 18 and over, there were 95.7 males.

The median income for a household in the CDP was $46,643, and the median income for a family was $52,071. Males had a median income of $38,688 versus $26,160 for females. The per capita income for the CDP was $19,889. About 3.9% of families and 6.7% of the population were below the poverty line, including 7.4% of those under age 18 and 6.8% of those age 65 or over.
