= Murraysville, North Carolina =

Murrayville, North Carolina
- CDP
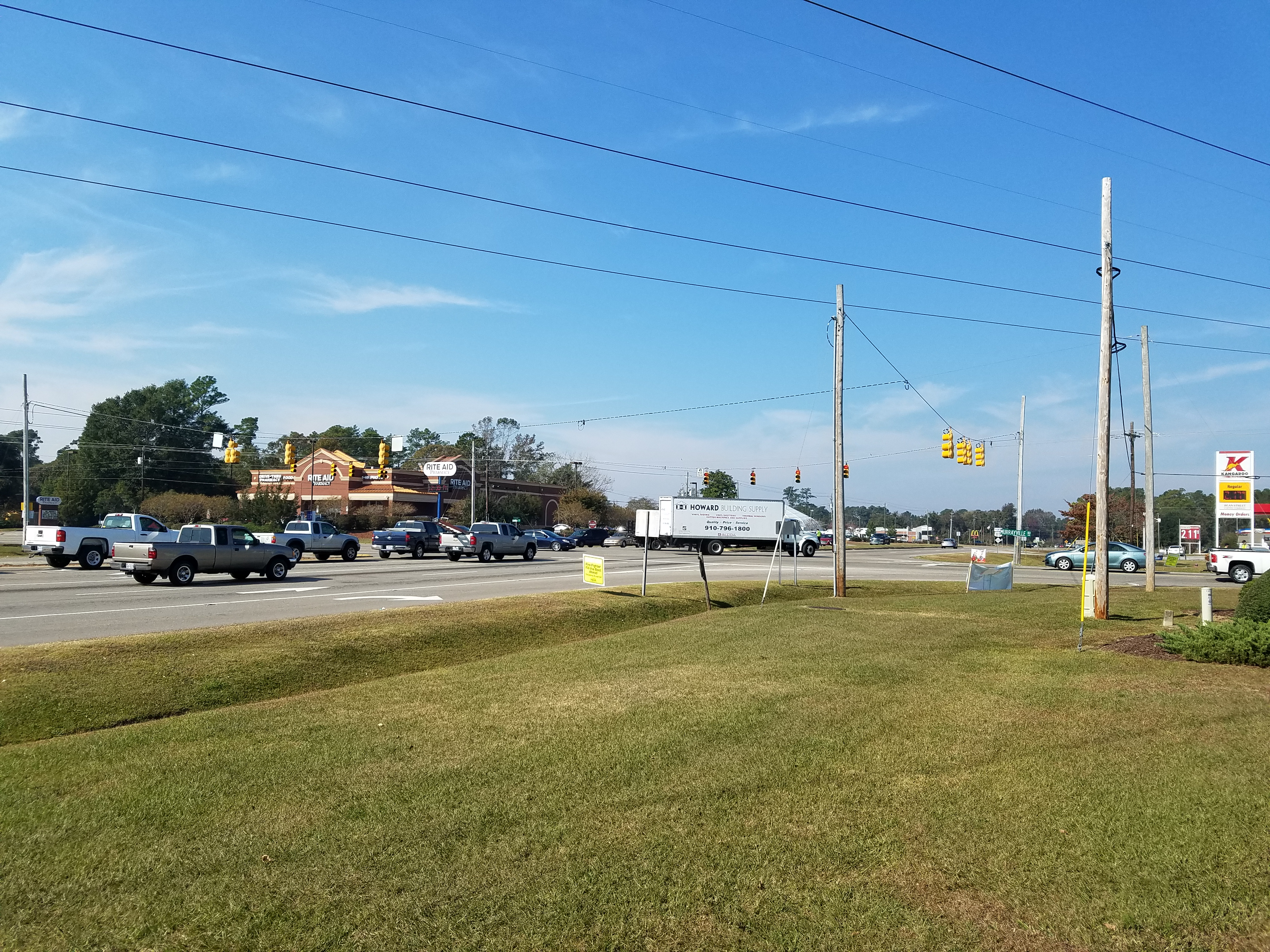
- Central junction in Murrayville at Murrayville Road and North Carolina Highway 132

- Location in New Hanover County and the state of North Carolina.
- Coordinates: 34°17′31″N 77°50′34″W
- Country: United States
- State: North Carolina
- County: New Hanover

Area
  - Total: 8.69 sq mi (22.50 km^{2})
  - Land: 8.61 sq mi (22.31 km^{2})
  - Water: 0.073 sq mi (0.19 km^{2})
- Elevation: 33 ft (10 m)

Population (2020)
  - Total: 16,582
  - Density: 1,925.0/sq mi (743.24/km^{2})
- Time zone: UTC-5 (Eastern (EST))
  - Summer (DST): UTC-4 (EDT)
- FIPS code: 37-45720
- GNIS feature ID: 2403320

Murrayville is a census-designated place (CDP) in New Hanover County, North Carolina, United States. The population was 16,582 at the 2020 census, up from 14,215 in 2010. Murrayville is located in the statistical townships of Cape Fear and Harnett. The CDP is part of the Wilmington Metropolitan Statistical Area. Murrayville was first listed as a CDP in the 2000 United States census.

== Geography ==
According to the United States Census Bureau, the CDP has a total area of 11.5 square miles (29.8 km^{2}), all land.

== Demographics ==
Historical population
Census	Pop.	Note	%±
2000	7,279		—
2010	14,215		95.3%
2020	16,582		16.7%
U.S. Decennial Census

=== 2020 census ===
Murraysville racial composition
Race	Number	Percentage
White (non-Hispanic)	11,886	71.68%
Black or African American (non-Hispanic)	1,945	11.73%
Native American	43	0.26%
Asian	396	2.39%
Pacific Islander	3	0.02%
Other/Mixed	803	4.84%
Hispanic or Latino	1,506	9.08%

As of the 2020 census, Murraysville had a population of 16,582. There were 6,761 households, including 4,370 families, and 7,303 housing units, of which 7.4% were vacant.

The median age was 36.9 years. About 22.2% of residents were under the age of 18, and 12.8% were 65 years of age or older. For every 100 females, there were 91.2 males, and for every 100 females age 18 and over there were 88.7 males.

Of households, 31.0% had children under the age of 18 living in them. Of all households, 47.5% were married-couple households, 16.4% had a male householder with no spouse or partner present, and 27.0% had a female householder with no spouse or partner present. About 25.5% of all households were made up of individuals, and 8.3% had someone living alone who was 65 years of age or older. The homeowner vacancy rate was 1.6%, and the rental vacancy rate was 12.8%.

About 99.0% of residents lived in urban areas, while 1.0% lived in rural areas.

=== 2000 census ===
As of the census of 2000, there were 7,279 people, 2,896 households, and 2,079 families residing in the CDP. The population density was 632.7 inhabitants per square mile (244.3/km^{2}). There were 3,060 housing units at an average density of 266.0 per square mile (102.7/km^{2}). The racial makeup of the CDP was 79.68% White, 17.69% African American, 0.19% Native American, 0.85% Asian, 0.03% Pacific Islander, 0.27% from other races, and 1.28% from two or more races. Hispanic or Latino of any race were 1.47% of the population.

There were 2,896 households, out of which 37.6% had children under the age of 18 living with them, 58.5% were married couples living together, 10.5% had a female householder with no husband present, and 28.2% were non-families. 20.4% of all households were made up of individuals, and 3.2% had someone living alone who was 65 years of age or older. The average household size was 2.51 and the average family size was 2.91.

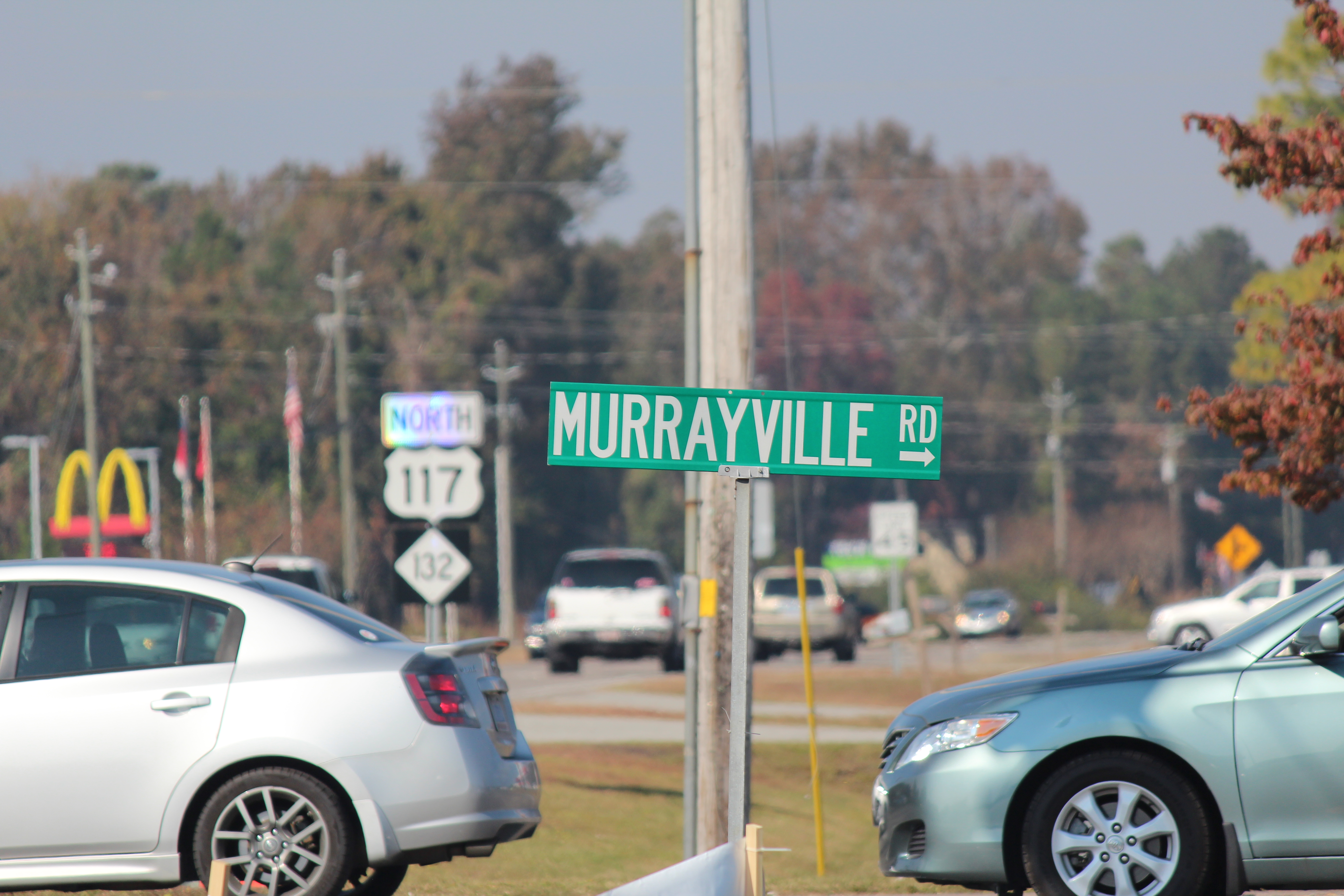
Murrayville Road sign at central junction in Murrayville

In the CDP, the population was spread out, with 25.8% under the age of 18, 8.1% from 18 to 24, 41.6% from 25 to 44, 18.6% from 45 to 64, and 6.0% who were 65 years of age or older. The median age was 31 years. For every 100 females, there were 94.9 males. For every 100 females age 18 and over, there were 90.5 males.

The median income for a household in the CDP was $45,815, and the median income for a family was $50,120. Males had a median income of $32,928 versus $25,092 for females. The per capita income for the CDP was $19,477. About 7.5% of families and 9.7% of the population were below the poverty line, including 9.8% of those under age 18 and 3.9% of those age 65 or over.
