= Kirkland, North Carolina =

- CDP
- Location in New Hanover County and the state of North Carolina.
- Coordinates: 34°19′02″N 77°47′48″W
- Country: United States
- State: North Carolina
- County: New Hanover

Area
  - Total: 8.4 sq mi (21.8 km^{2})
  - Land: 8.4 sq mi (21.7 km^{2})
  - Water: 0.039 sq mi (0.1 km^{2})
- Elevation: 43 ft (13 m)

Population (2020)
  - Total: 7,397
- Time zone: UTC-5 (Eastern (EST))
  - Summer (DST): UTC-4 (EDT)
- FIPS code: 37-35975
- GNIS feature ID: 2403179

Kirkland, more commonly known as Porter's Neck, was a census-designated place (CDP) in New Hanover County, North Carolina, United States. The population was 7,397 at the 2020 census which is up from 6,204 in 2010. The CDP was redesignated as Porters Neck CDP for the 2010 census. Porter’s Neck is located in the statistical townships of Cape Fear and Harnett. The CDP is part of the Wilmington Metropolitan Statistical Area. Porter’s Neck, then Kirkland, was first listed as a CDP at the 2000 United States census.

== Geography ==
According to the United States Census Bureau, the CDP has a total area of 8.4 square miles (22 km^{2}), of which 8.4 square miles (22 km^{2}) is land and 0.04 square miles (0.10 km^{2}) (0.24%) is water.

== Demographics ==
Historical population
Census	Pop.	Note	%±
2000	597		—
2010	6,204		939.2%
2020	7,397		19.2%

=== 2020 census ===
Porters Neck racial composition
Race	Number	Percentage
White (non-Hispanic)	6,548	88.52%
Black or African American (non-Hispanic)	217	2.93%
Native American	9	0.12%
Asian	110	1.49%
Pacific Islander	2	0.03%
Other/Mixed	258	3.49%
Hispanic or Latino	253	3.42%

As of the 2020 United States census, there were 7,397 people, 3,087 households, and 2,282 families residing in the CDP.

=== 2000 census ===
As of the census of 2000, there were 579 people, 212 households, and 160 families residing in the CDP. The population density was 69.0 inhabitants per square mile (26.6/km^{2}). There were 231 housing units at an average density of 27.5 per square mile (10.6/km^{2}). The racial makeup of the CDP was 64.08% White, 33.85% African American, 0.17% Native American, 0.35% Asian, and 1.55% from two or more races. Hispanic or Latino of any race were 2.07% of the population.

There were 212 households, out of which 33.0% had children under the age of 18 living with them, 59.0% were married couples living together, 12.3% had a female householder with no husband present, and 24.5% were non-families. 21.7% of all households were made up of individuals, and 5.7% had someone living alone who was 65 years of age or older. The average household size was 2.73 and the average family size was 3.18.

In the CDP, the population was spread out, with 24.5% under the age of 18, 6.2% from 18 to 24, 30.9% from 25 to 44, 28.5% from 45 to 64, and 9.8% who were 65 years of age or older. The median age was 38 years. For every 100 females, there were 96.3 males. For every 100 females age 18 and over, there were 95.1 males.

The median income for a household in the CDP was $56,292, and the median income for a family was $57,083. Males had a median income of $34,063 versus $22,614 for females. The per capita income for the CDP was $21,439. About 8.2% of families and 10.2% of the population were below the poverty line, including none of those under age 18 and 15.9% of those age 65 or over.
