= Ogden, North Carolina =

- CDP
- Location in New Hanover County and the state of North Carolina.
- Coordinates: 34°15′56″N 77°47′48″W
- Country: United States
- State: North Carolina
- County: New Hanover

Area
  - Total: 4.76 sq mi (12.34 km^{2})
  - Land: 4.53 sq mi (11.74 km^{2})
  - Water: 0.23 sq mi (0.60 km^{2})
- Elevation: 10 ft (3.0 m)

Population (2020)
  - Total: 8,200
  - Density: 1,808.4/sq mi (698.22/km^{2})
- Time zone: UTC-5 (Eastern (EST))
  - Summer (DST): UTC-4 (EDT)
- FIPS code: 37-48790
- GNIS feature ID: 2403370

Ogden is a census-designated place (CDP) in New Hanover County, North Carolina, United States. The CDP is both a suburb of the city of Wilmington and part of the Wilmington Metropolitan Statistical Area. The population was 8,200 at the 2020 census, up from 6,766 in 2010. Ogden is located in the statistical township of Harnett. Ogden was first listed as a CDP at the 1980 United States Census.

== Recent developments ==
A Census-designated place north of Wilmington, Ogden has become increasingly developed and populated since the late 1990s. This development was furthered by Ogden's location between the luxurious residential communities of Porter's Neck to the north, Middle Sound Loop in the middle, and Landfall to the south. Ogden is also fairly close to Figure Eight Island, an island community north of Wrightsville Beach. The Ogden area currently contains several grocery stores, drug stores, and many restaurants.

== Geography ==
According to the United States Census Bureau, the CDP has a total area of 4.8 square miles (12 km^{2}), of which 4.7 square miles (12.0 km^{2}) is land and 0.1 square miles (0.26 km^{2}) (2.31%) is water.

== Demographics ==
Historical population
Census	Pop.	Note	%±
1980	2,811		—
1990	3,328		18.4%
2000	5,481		64.7%
2010	6,766		23.4%
2020	8,200		21.2%
U.S. Decennial Census

=== 2020 census ===
As of the 2020 census, Ogden had a population of 8,200.

The median age was 42.8 years. 24.3% of residents were under the age of 18 and 19.7% of residents were 65 years of age or older. For every 100 females there were 96.1 males, and for every 100 females age 18 and over there were 92.9 males age 18 and over.

100.0% of residents lived in urban areas, while 0.0% lived in rural areas.

There were 3,160 households in Ogden, of which 33.8% had children under the age of 18 living in them. Of all households, 63.8% were married-couple households, 12.0% were households with a male householder and no spouse or partner present, and 19.5% were households with a female householder and no spouse or partner present. About 20.9% of all households were made up of individuals and 10.0% had someone living alone who was 65 years of age or older.

There were 3,313 housing units, of which 4.6% were vacant. The homeowner vacancy rate was 1.6% and the rental vacancy rate was 4.7%.

Ogden racial composition
Race	Number	Percentage
White (non-Hispanic)	7,375	89.94%
Black or African American (non-Hispanic)	132	1.61%
Native American	5	0.06%
Asian	77	0.94%
Pacific Islander	1	0.01%
Other/Mixed	318	3.88%
Hispanic or Latino	292	3.56%

=== 2000 census ===
As of the census of 2000, there were 5,481 people, 2,133 households, and 1,623 families residing in the CDP. The population density was 1,178.4 people per square mile (455.0 people/km^{2}). There were 2,270 housing units at an average density of 488.1 per square mile (188.5/km^{2}). The racial makeup of the CDP was 96.57% White, 1.48% African American, 0.24% Native American, 0.60% Asian, 0.26% from other races, and 0.86% from two or more races. Hispanic or Latino of any race were 1.17% of the population.

There were 2,133 households, out of which 37.0% had children under the age of 18 living with them, 67.7% were married couples living together, 6.4% had a female householder with no husband present, and 23.9% were non-families. 18.1% of all households were made up of individuals, and 5.3% had someone living alone who was 65 years of age or older. The average household size was 2.57 and the average family size was 2.93.

In the CDP, the population was spread out, with 25.2% under the age of 18, 5.2% from 18 to 24, 32.0% from 25 to 44, 27.8% from 45 to 64, and 9.8% who were 65 years of age or older. The median age was 39 years. For every 100 females, there were 98.7 males. For every 100 females age 18 and over, there were 97.3 males.

The median income for a household in the CDP was $61,684, and the median income for a family was $73,750. Males had a median income of $45,878 versus $31,404 for females. The per capita income for the CDP was $28,741. About 3.5% of families and 5.8% of the population were below the poverty line, including 6.4% of those under age 18 and 3.5% of those age 65 or over.
