= USS North Carolina =

USS North Carolina may refer to:

- USS North Carolina (1820) was a ship of the line launched in 1820 and sold in 1867
- USS North Carolina (ACR-12) was a Tennessee-class cruiser launched in 1906 and escorted troop transports during World War I and sold for scrap in 1930
- USS North Carolina (BB-52) was a South Dakota-class battleship, laid down but soon canceled by the Washington Naval Treaty in 1920
- USS North Carolina (BB-55) is a North Carolina-class battleship launched in 1940; decommissioned in 1947 and a museum ship in Wilmington, North Carolina
- USS North Carolina (SSN-777) is a Virginia-class submarine commissioned in 2008 and currently in service

== See also ==
- CSS North Carolina
