= Fayetteville metropolitan area, North Carolina =

Metropolitan area in the United States

Fayetteville Metropolitan Area
- Metropolitan Statistical Area
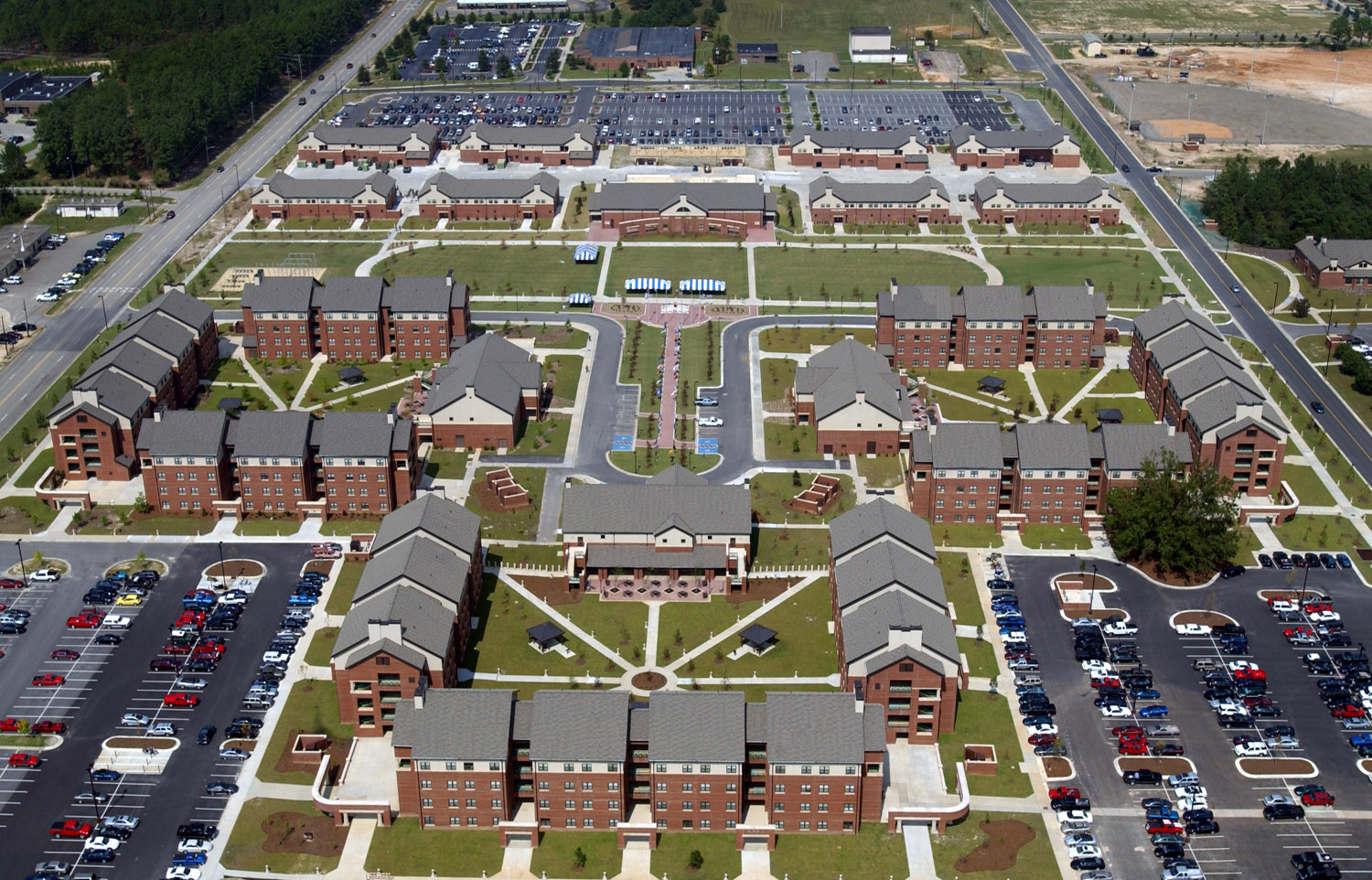
- Barracks of the 1st Brigade, 82nd Airborne Division at Fort Bragg
Map of Fayetteville–Lumberton–Pinehurst, NC CSA
City of Fayetteville
Fayetteville MSA
Lumberton µSA
Pinehurst–Southern Pines MSA
Rockingham µSA
Laurinburg µSA
Fort Bragg
- Country: United States
- State: North Carolina
- Largest city: Fayetteville
- Other cities: Lumberton; Pinehurst; Laurinburg; Rockingham

Area
  - Total: 1,638 sq mi (4,240 km^{2})

Population (2020)
  - Total: 392,194

GDP
  - Total: $25.960 billion (2022)
- Time zone: UTC-5 (EST)
  - Summer (DST): UTC-4 (EDT)
- Area codes: 919, 984

The Fayetteville, NC Metropolitan Statistical Area, as defined by the US Office of Management and Budget (OMB), is a metropolitan statistical area consisting of two counties – Cumberland and Hoke – in eastern North Carolina, anchored by the city of Fayetteville. The metropolitan area is served by Interstate 95, Interstate 295, U.S. and state highways, Fayetteville Regional Airport, Amtrak, Greyhound, Megabus and several railroad systems. As of the 2020 census, the MSA had a population of 386,810, increasing to an estimated 395,412 in 2025. The MSA is a component of the broader Fayetteville–Lumberton–Pinehurst, NC Combined Statistical Area, which adds the Pinehurst–Southern Pines metropolitan area and three micropolitan areas (Laurinburg, Lumberton, and Rockingham).

== Counties ==
County	Seat	2025 estimate	2020 Census	Change	Area	Density
Cumberland	Fayetteville	338,473	334,728	+1.12%	658.48 sq mi (1,705.5 km^{2})	514/sq mi (198/km^{2})
Hoke	Raeford	56,939	52,082	+9.33%	391.68 sq mi (1,014.4 km^{2})	145/sq mi (56/km^{2})
Total		395,412	386,810	+2.22%	1,050.16 sq mi (2,719.9 km^{2})	377/sq mi (145/km^{2})

== Communities ==
- Places with more than 100,000 inhabitants
  - Fayetteville (principal city)
- Places with 10,000 to 30,000 inhabitants
  - Fort Bragg – In the 2000 Census, Fort Bragg was a "census designated place." This means it was an unincorporated place that the Census Bureau recognized and designated as an identifiable community worthy of data tabulation. However, Fort Bragg was no longer designated as a "census designated place" in the 2010 Census, because the part of Fort Bragg in Cumberland County was annexed by Fayetteville and Spring Lake in 2008 (through an annexation adopted by the NC General Assembly).
  - Hope Mills
  - Lumberton
  - Spring Lake
- Places with 1,000 to 10,000 inhabitants
  - Dunn
  - Eastover
  - Raeford
  - Rockfish
  - Vander
  - Silver City
- Places with less than 1,000 inhabitants
  - Ashley Heights
  - Bowmore
  - Dundarrach
  - Falcon (partial)
  - Five Points
  - Godwin
  - Linden
  - Stedman
  - Wade

== Transportation ==
- Interstate 95
- Interstate 295
- U.S. and state highways
- Fayetteville Regional Airport
- Amtrak
- Greyhound
- Megabus
- Several railroad systems

== Demographics ==
According to the latest figures from the U.S. Census Bureau, there were 366,383 people, 143,306 households and 88,722 families residing within the MSA. The racial makeup of the MSA was 54.09% White, 35.17% African American, 2.54% Native American, 1.77% Asian, 0.28% Pacific Islander, 3.14% from other races, and 3.00% from two or more races. Hispanic or Latino of any race were 6.93% of the population.

The median income for a household in the MSA was $44,757, and the median income for a family was $54,895. Males had a median income of $38,958 versus $32,078 for females. The per capita income for the MSA was $22,856.

== Combined Statistical Area ==
Based on commuting patterns, the Office of Management and Budget combines the Fayetteville metropolitan area with the adjacent metropolitan area of Pinehurst–Southern Pines (Moore County) and the adjacent micropolitan areas of Laurinburg (Scotland County), Lumberton (Robeson County), and Rockingham (Richmond County) to form the broader Fayetteville–Lumberton–Pinehurst, NC Combined Statistical Area (CSA). The population of this wider region is 701,335 as of 2025. The Fayetteville CSA is the 74th largest CSA in the United States.

Statistical Area	2025 estimate	2020 Census	Change	Area	Density
Fayetteville, NC Metropolitan Statistical Area	395,412	386,810	+2.22%	1,050.16 sq mi (2,719.9 km^{2})	377/sq mi (145/km^{2})
Lumberton, NC Micropolitan Statistical Area	119,941	116,530	+2.93%	949.26 sq mi (2,458.6 km^{2})	126/sq mi (49/km^{2})
Pinehurst–Southern Pines, NC Metropolitan Statistical Area	110,619	99,727	+10.92%	705.69 sq mi (1,827.7 km^{2})	157/sq mi (61/km^{2})
Rockingham, NC Micropolitan Statistical Area	42,041	42,946	−2.11%	479.70 sq mi (1,242.4 km^{2})	88/sq mi (34/km^{2})
Laurinburg, NC Micropolitan Statistical Area	33,322	34,174	−2.49%	320.62 sq mi (830.4 km^{2})	104/sq mi (40/km^{2})
Total	701,335	680,187	+3.11%	3,505.43 sq mi (9,079.0 km^{2})	200/sq mi (77/km^{2})

== See also ==
- North Carolina statistical areas
- List of cities, towns, and villages in North Carolina
- List of unincorporated communities in North Carolina
