= National Register of Historic Places listings in Hoke County, North Carolina =

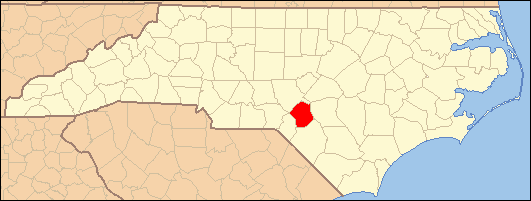

This list includes properties and districts listed on the National Register of Historic Places in Hoke County, North Carolina. Click the "Map of all coordinates" link to the right to view a Google map of all properties and districts with latitude and longitude coordinates in the table below.

== Current listings ==
This National Park Service list is complete through NPS recent listings posted March 14, 2025.

| | Name on the Register | Image | Date listed | Location | City or town | Description |
|---|---|---|---|---|---|---|
| 1 | Hoke County Courthouse | Hoke County Courthouse | May 10, 1979 (#79001725) | Main and Edenborough Sts. 34°58′52″N 79°13′25″W | Raeford | |
| 2 | Long Street Church | | January 21, 1974 (#74001353) | W of Fayetteville on SR 1300; 35°07′20″N 79°07′13″W | Fayetteville | |
| 3 | Mill Prong | Mill Prong | December 13, 1979 (#79001724) | 3062 Edinburgh Rd, Red Springs, NC 28367; 34°54′20″N 79°17′17″W | Red Springs | Federal style home built in 1795 |
| 4 | Puppy Creek Plantation | Puppy Creek Plantation | December 12, 1976 (#76001329) | NW of Rockfish on SR 1409; 35°01′15″N 79°07′45″W | Rockfish | |
| 5 | Raeford Historic District | Raeford Historic District | August 9, 2006 (#06000690) | Roughly bounded by Jackson St., E. Central Ave., the Aberdeen and Rockfish, and E and W Elwood Ave. 34°58′42″N 79°13′22″W | Raeford | |

== See also ==
- National Register of Historic Places listings in North Carolina
- List of National Historic Landmarks in North Carolina
