= North Carolina Highway 71 =

State highway in North Carolina, US

North Carolina Highway 71

Route information
- Maintained by NCDOT
- Length: 27.1 mi (43.6 km)
- Existed: 1928–present

Major junctions
- South end: US 74 Bus. / NC 130 in Maxton
- US 74 in Maxton
- North end: US 301 near Parkton

Location
- Country: United States
- State: North Carolina
- Counties: Robeson, Scotland

Highway system
- North Carolina Highway System; Interstate; US; State; Scenic
← US 70	→ NC 72

North Carolina Highway 71 (NC 71) is a state highway that serves the communities of Maxton, Red Springs, Shannon, Lumber Bridge, and Parkton. Most of the highway travels through Robeson County but a short portion of it passes through Scotland County.

== Route description ==
The southern terminus of the route is U.S. Route 74 Business (US 74 Bus.) and Martin Luther King Drive in central Maxton. This point is also the western terminus of NC 130 from there the route follows North Patterson St to the US 74 / Future Interstate 74 interchange (exit 191 on US 74). Shortly after leaving town, the route has a brief incursion into Scotland County, it returns to Robeson County by crossing the Lumber River. After passing through the community of Wakulla, the route has a brief concurrency with NC 211 in the town of Red Springs. After the split from NC 211, NC 71 continues northeast to Shannon. To the north the highway serves Lumber Bridge, where it intersects NC 20, and Parkton. The northern terminus of the route is US 301, just outside Parkton.

== History ==
The route was created in 1928 running from Maxton to Red Springs. In 1930 the route was extended, receiving a southern terminus in Rowland, and its current northern terminus with present-day US 301. The southern terminus of the route was again extended in 1931 reaching modern-day NC 41 just south of Fairmont. In the 1940s, NC 71 south of Maxton was resigned as NC 130, receiving its current routing.

== Major intersections ==
County	Location	mi	km	Destinations	Notes
Robeson	Maxton	0.0	0.0	US 74 Bus. (Dr. Martin Luther King Jr. Drive) / NC 130 east (South Patterson Street)	Western terminus of NC 130
Robeson	Maxton	0.9– 1.1	1.4– 1.8	US 74 to I-74 – Lumberton, Laurinburg	Exit 191 (US 74)
Scotland	No major junctions				
Robeson	Red Springs	12.1	19.5	NC 211 south (Main Street) / 3rd Avenue	Southern end of NC 211 concurrency
Robeson	Red Springs	12.8	20.6	NC 211 north – Raeford	Northern end of NC 211 concurrency
Robeson	Lumber Bridge	20.6	33.2	NC 20 (Main Street) – Raeford, St. Pauls	
Robeson		27.1	43.6	US 301 / Everett Road – Lumberton, Fayetteville	
1.000 mi = 1.609 km; 1.000 km = 0.621 mi: Concurrency terminus
