= Aberdeen and Rockfish Railroad =

Short-line railroad in North Carolina

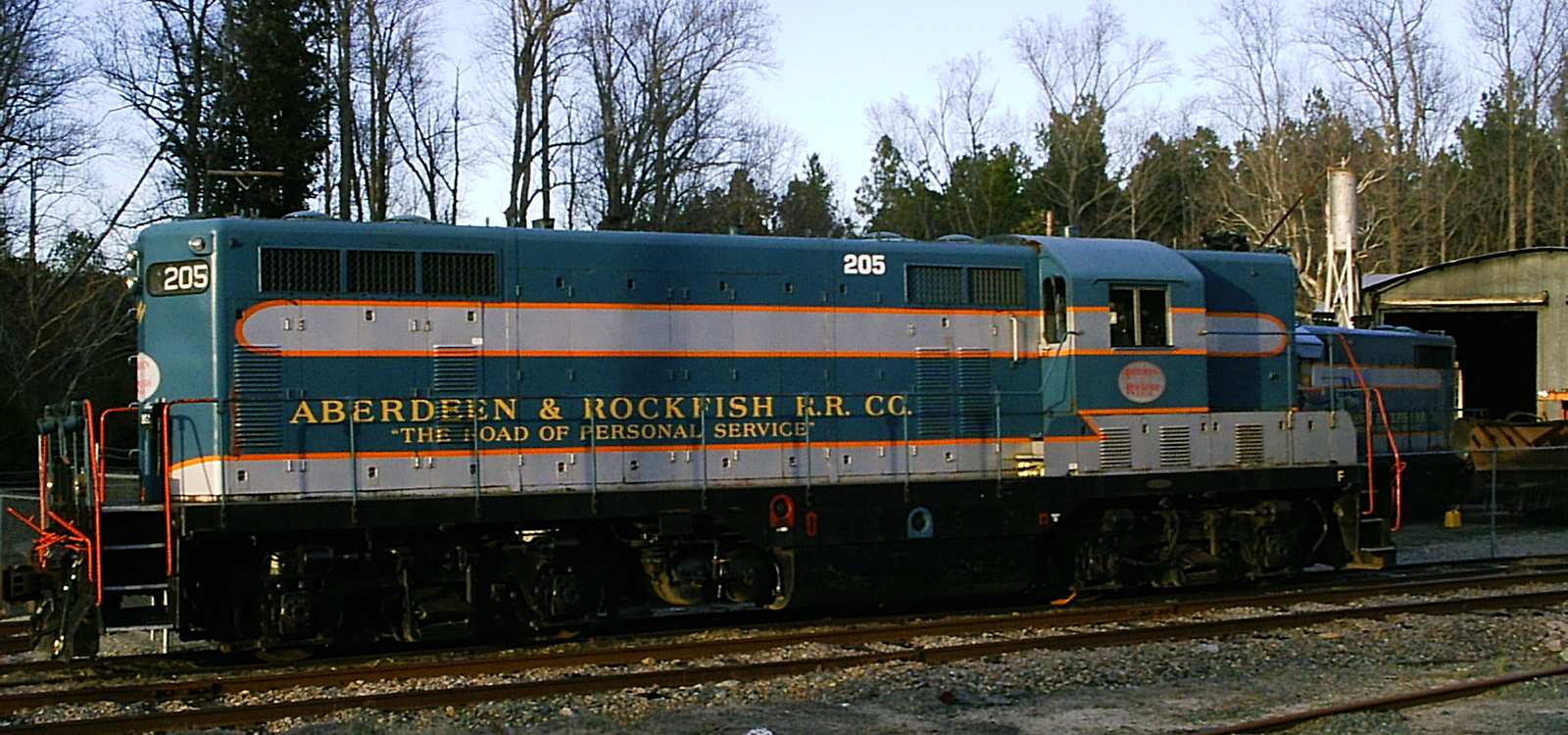
- Aberdeen and Rockfish EMD GP7 No. 205 in the company's yard. 205 was the last "one owner" GP7 in operation before being donated to the NC Transportation Museum on March 27, 2026.

Overview
- Headquarters: Aberdeen, North Carolina
- Reporting mark: AR
- Locale: North Carolina
- Dates of operation: 1892–present

Technical
- Track gauge: 4 ft 8 1/2 in (1,435 mm) standard gauge
- Length: 47 miles (76 km)

Other
- Website: Official website

The Aberdeen and Rockfish Railroad (reporting mark AR) is a short-line railroad operating in North Carolina, United States. At one time, the AR was a Class 2 railroad. The railroad has 47 miles (76 km) of track between Aberdeen and Fayetteville, North Carolina.

== History ==
The AR was incorporated in 1892 by businessman John Blue. He built the railroad to get his timber and turpentine products to market. On June 30, 1895, the first line was opened between Aberdeen and Endon. In 1898, the company added a line from Ashley Heights to Raeford which soon became the main line with the Endon line as a branch. Shortly thereafter, the Endon branch was extended to Juniper. The main line was extended to Dundarrach in 1900, Rockfish in 1902, Fenix in 1904, and a branch from Rockfish to Hope Mills was added in 1905. Aberdeen–Hope Mills became the main line for a while, with branches to Juniper and Fenix..

On November 14, 1909, another branch opened from Raeford to Wagram. In 1912, the company abandoned the Endon branch. It used the rails to construct an extension from Fenix to Fayetteville, which opened on December 23 that year. At the same time the line to Hope Mills was abandoned, as it became unnecessary with the new link to the main line of the Atlantic Coast Line Railroad in Fayetteville. Over the years, the railroad's traffic has shifted from lumber to agriculture products. The Blue family still owns the AR and operates freight trains from Aberdeen to Fayetteville. The Wagram branch was sold to the Laurinburg and Southern Railroad in 1921. Passenger service ended in 1949.

== Traffic ==
- Chemicals
- Animal Feed
- Grain
- Animal By-Products
- Building Supplies
- Fertilizer Solution

== Route ==
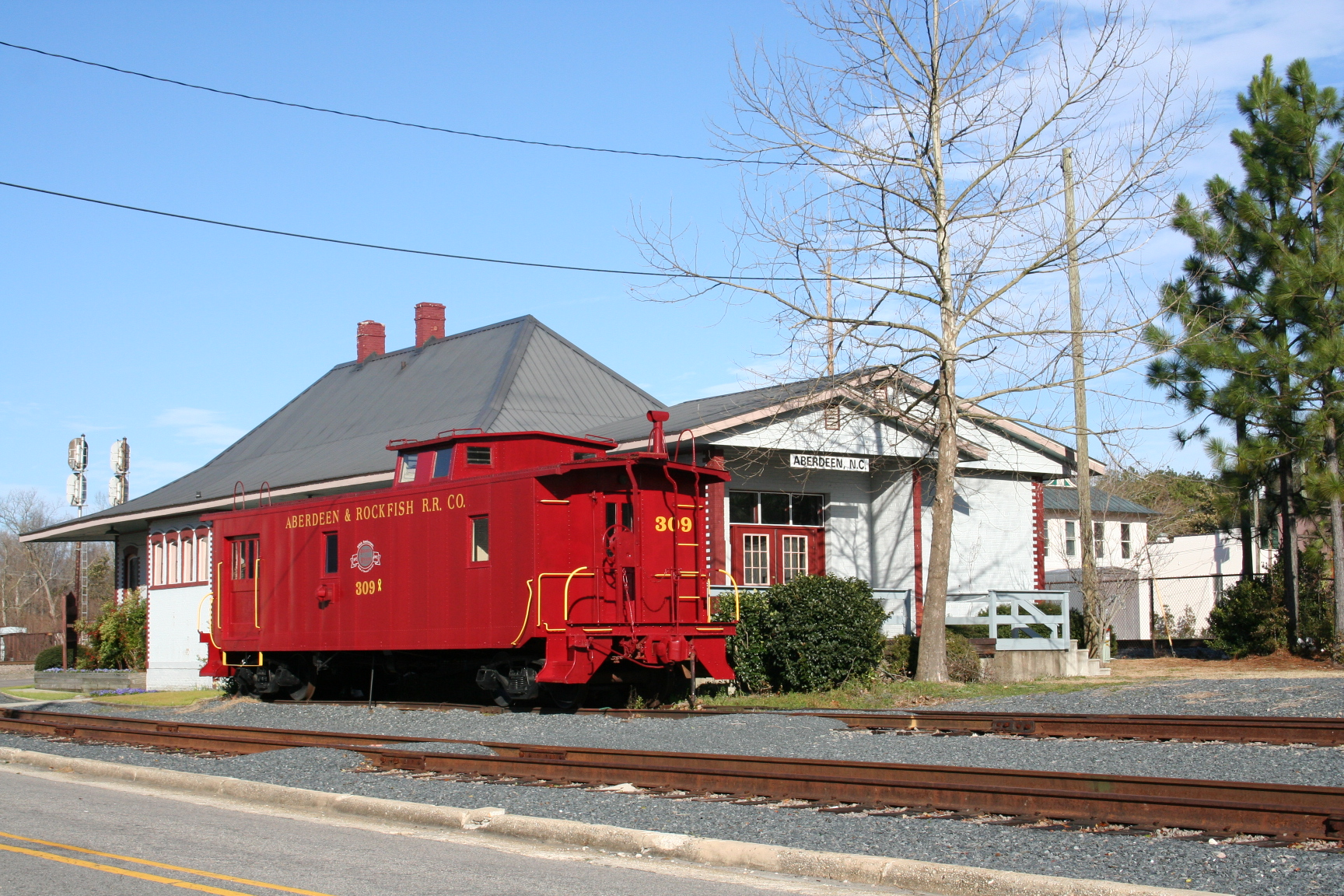
The station building in Aberdeen, one of the line's namesake towns.

- M.P. 00 Aberdeen, North Carolina - interchange with CSX (former SAL) and Aberdeen, Carolina and Western Railway (ACWR) and NS (former Southern Rwy, previously Norfolk & Southern RR).
- Spivey Hill Siding
- M.P. 05 Ashley Heights, North Carolina (abandoned AR branch (8 miles) used to run east to Endon and Juniper)
- McCain
- M.P. 10 Montrose
- M.P. 13 Timberland
- M.P. 19 Raeford, North Carolina - interchange with Laurinburg and Southern Railroad (LRS) that runs over former AR track to Edinburgh, Purcell and Wagram, North Carolina (12 miles).
- Upchurch Siding
- M.P. 24 Dundarrach, North Carolina
- M.P. 26 Arabia, North Carolina
- M.P. 30 Rockfish, North Carolina
- M.P. 31 Hope Mills Junction (abandoned AR branch that used to run east to Hope Mills, NC)
- M.P. 34 Fenix
- M.P. 36 Cliffdale - former junction with branch to Clifbragg (former Cape Fear Railways route)
- M.P. 40 Skibo - former junction with abandoned track of Cape Fear Railways (CF)(Route to Fort Bragg)
- M.P. 42 Owens
- M.P. 45 South Fayetteville, North Carolina CSX (former ACL) AND NS (former Norfolk & Southern RR)
- River Terminal (on Cape Fear River)

== Fleet ==
The Aberdeen and Rockfish fleet consists of 6 locomotives, all originally built by EMD: 3 of the current 6 were bought new by the railroad.

The railroad also utilized a number of steam locomotives. One of the locomotives, Number 40, is now used on the Valley Railroad in Connecticut.

Number	Type	Built	Notes	Status
200	EMD F3	04/1947	Bought new, traded to EMD as credit towards GP18 300.	Off Roster
201	EMD F3	11/1948	Bought new, sold to RF&P(10/1952) as 1111 to pay for GP7 205	Off Roster
205	EMD GP7	09/1951	Bought new, last GP7 operated by original owner	Off Roster - Donated to the NC Transportation Museum on March 27, 2026.
300	EMD GP18	08/1963	Bought new	Active
400	EMD GP38	06/1968	Bought new	Active
405	EMD GP38	01/1967	Originally Erie Mining 700, bought from NIWX.	Active
2486	Santa Fe CF7	08/1951	Originally EMD F7, almost completely rebuilt by AT&SF in 1975.	Active
4002, 4004, 4006	EMD GP40	1966/1970	Former Dakota, Minnesota and Eastern Railroad locomotives, purchased in 2025	Active
5830	EMD GP38-2	1980	Built as Southern 7033, GP50. Rebuilt by Juniata Shop to GP38-3	Active
8757, 8763	EMD SD60M	12/1992	Former CSX Transportation/Conrail locomotives, purchased in 2026	Active

== See also ==
- Laurinburg and Southern Railroad
