= North Carolina Highway 20 =

State highway in Hoke, Robeson, and Bladen counties in North Carolina, United States

North Carolina Highway 20

Route information
- Maintained by NCDOT
- Length: 28.6 mi (46.0 km)
- Existed: 1934–present

Major junctions
- West end: US 401 Bus. / NC 211 in Raeford
- I-95 in St. Pauls; US 301 in St. Pauls
- East end: NC 87 near Tar Heel

Location
- Country: United States
- State: North Carolina
- Counties: Hoke, Robeson, Bladen

Highway system
- North Carolina Highway System; Interstate; US; State; Scenic
| ← US 19W | → US 21 |

North Carolina Highway 20 (NC 20) is a 27-mile (43 km) North Carolina state highway that runs through Hoke, Robeson and Bladen counties. It serves as a major road in each of the three incorporated communities through which it passes. The route is co-designated as St. Pauls Road in Raeford, Main Street in Lumber Bridge, and Broad Street in St. Pauls.

== Route description ==
NC 20 begins at its western terminus at NC 211 and runs concurrent with US 401 Bus. along Central Avenue for about 0.3 miles (0.48 km) in Raeford. The route then heads southeast as St. Pauls Drive, crossing over Peddlers Branch before exiting town. The route then passes through Dundarrach before exiting Hoke County. In Lumber Bridge, NC 20 continues as Main Street and intersects NC 71 and then continues southeast, passing by Rex.

The highway then interchanges I-95 and then intersects US 301 as it passes through St. Pauls as Broad Street. The route then enters Bladen County and reaches its eastern terminus at NC 87 north of Tar Heel.

== History ==
The original NC 20 was at one time the longest numbered route in North Carolina, running from the Tennessee border to the port city of Wilmington, a distance of 401 miles (645 km). After the introduction of U.S. highways in North Carolina in 1934, the route was carved up between routes US 19, US 70, US 74, US 76, and US 17.

The modern NC 20 was originally NC 220. Despite a few minor reroutings, the state highway has remained largely unchanged since the 1930s. The NC 220 designation was dropped permanently from the state highway system around 1935 after the introduction of US 220 into North Carolina. With the possible extension of I-20 into North Carolina, this route may be renumbered again.

== Major intersections ==
| County | Location | mi | km | Destinations | Notes |
|---|---|---|---|---|---|
| Hoke | Raeford | 0.0 | 0.0 | US 401 Bus. south / NC 211 (Main Street) – Wagram, Red Springs, Aberdeen | West end of US 401 Bus. overlap |
| Hoke | Raeford | 0.3 | 0.48 | US 401 Bus. north (Central Avenue) – Fayetteville | East end of US 401 Bus. overlap |
| Robeson | Lumber Bridge | 11.3 | 18.2 | NC 71 – Red Springs, Parkton | |
| Robeson | St. Pauls | 18.6– 18.7 | 29.9– 30.1 | I-95 – Lumberton, Fayetteville | I-95 exit 31; diamond interchange |
| Robeson | St. Pauls | 19.3 | 31.1 | US 301 (5th Street) – Lumberton, Hope Mills | |
| Bladen | Tar Heel | 28.6 | 46.0 | NC 87 – Dublin, Fayetteville | |
1.000 mi = 1.609 km; 1.000 km = 0.621 mi: Concurrency terminus
