= Silver City, North Carolina =

- Census-designated place
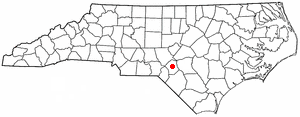
- Location of Silver City, North Carolina
- Coordinates: 34°59′50″N 79°13′45″W
- Country: United States
- State: North Carolina
- County: Hoke

Area
  - Total: 1.49 sq mi (3.87 km^{2})
  - Land: 1.49 sq mi (3.87 km^{2})
  - Water: 0 sq mi (0.00 km^{2})
- Elevation: 213 ft (65 m)

Population (2020)
  - Total: 643
  - Density: 430.5/sq mi (166.22/km^{2})
- Time zone: UTC-5 (Eastern (EST))
  - Summer (DST): UTC-4 (EDT)
- ZIP code: 28376
- Area codes: 910, 472
- FIPS code: 37-61920
- GNIS feature ID: 2402853

Silver City is an unincorporated area and census-designated place (CDP) in Hoke County, North Carolina in the United States. As of the 2020 census, Silver City had a population of 643.

== Geography ==
Silver City is located in central Hoke County on the north side of the city of Raeford, the county seat. U.S. Route 401 passes through the community, leading east 21 miles (34 km) to Fayetteville and southwest the same distance to Laurinburg. The center of Raeford is 1 mile (1.6 km) south of Silver City down North Main Street.

According to the United States Census Bureau, the CDP has a total area of 1.5 square miles (3.9 km^{2}), all of it land. The CDP is bordered to the northeast by Rockfish Creek, a tributary of the Cape Fear River.

== Demographics ==
Historical population
Census	Pop.	Note	%±
2000	1,146		—
2010	882		−23.0%
2020	643		−27.1%
U.S. Decennial Census

=== 2020 census ===
Silver City CDP, North Carolina – Racial and ethnic composition Note: the US Census treats Hispanic/Latino as an ethnic category. This table excludes Latinos from the racial categories and assigns them to a separate category. Hispanics/Latinos may be of any race.
Race / Ethnicity (NH = Non-Hispanic)	Pop 2000	Pop 2010	Pop 2020	% 2000	% 2010	% 2020
White alone (NH)	39	34	32	3.40%	3.85%	4.98%
Black or African American alone (NH)	1,075	792	544	93.80%	89.80%	84.60%
Native American or Alaska Native alone (NH)	8	9	3	0.70%	1.02%	0.47%
Asian alone (NH)	5	1	0	0.44%	0.11%	0.00%
Native Hawaiian or Pacific Islander alone (NH)	0	0	0	0.00%	0.00%	0.00%
Other race alone (NH)	0	0	0	0.00%	0.00%	0.00%
Mixed race or Multiracial (NH)	4	28	22	0.35%	3.17%	3.42%
Hispanic or Latino (any race)	15	18	42	1.31%	2.04%	6.53%
Total	1,146	882	643	100.00%	100.00%	100.00%

=== 2000 census ===
As of the census of 2000, there were 1,146 people, 424 households, and 303 families residing in the CDP. The population density was 746.7 inhabitants per square mile (288.3/km^{2}). There were 465 housing units at an average density of 303.0 per square mile (117.0/km^{2}). The racial makeup of the CDP was 3.40% White, 94.24% African American, 0.70% Native American, 0.44% Asian, 0.44% from other races, and 0.79% from two or more races. Hispanic or Latino of any race were 1.31% of the population.

There were 424 households, out of which 25.9% had children under the age of 18 living with them, 30.0% were married couples living together, 35.8% had a female householder with no husband present, and 28.5% were non-families. 26.7% of all households were made up of individuals, and 11.3% had someone living alone who was 65 years of age or older. The average household size was 2.70 and the average family size was 3.26.

In the CDP the population was spread out, with 27.1% under the age of 18, 9.0% from 18 to 24, 26.4% from 25 to 44, 22.9% from 45 to 64, and 14.7% who were 65 years of age or older. The median age was 38 years. For every 100 females there were 76.3 males. For every 100 females age 18 and over, there were 75.1 males.

The median income for a household in the CDP was $25,238, and the median income for a family was $29,464. Males had a median income of $24,444 versus $18,850 for females. The per capita income for the CDP was $13,139. About 15.3% of families and 20.7% of the population were below the poverty line, including 25.8% of those under age 18 and 23.8% of those age 65 or over.
