= Laurinburg and Southern Railroad =

Railway line in North Carolina, United States

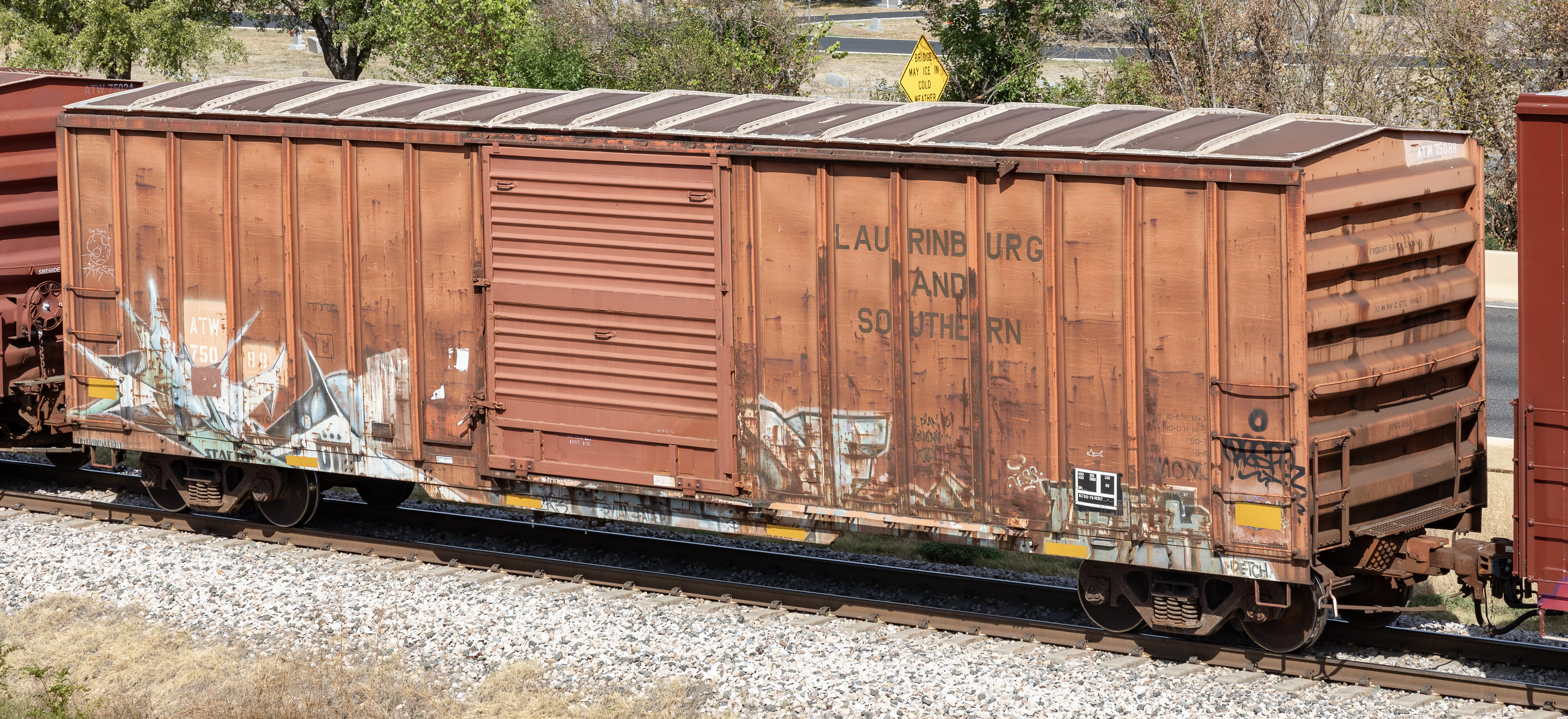
- An ex-Laurinburg and Southern boxcar is seen in Austin, Texas, on June 30th, 2023.

Overview
- Headquarters: Laurinburg, North Carolina
- Reporting mark: LRS
- Locale: North Carolina
- Dates of operation: 1909–Present

Technical
- Track gauge: 4 ft 8 1/2 in (1,435 mm) (standard gauge)
- Length: 28 miles (45 km)

Other
- Website: G&O: Laurinburg & Southern Railroad

The Laurinburg and Southern Railroad (reporting mark LRS) is a short-line railroad operating in North Carolina. The railroad has 28 mi (45 km) of track that runs south from Raeford to Laurinburg, North Carolina and industries to the south. However, much of the line is out of service, and sections at either end are used for car storage. In the past, the Laurinburg and Southern controlled a number of other small railroads in North Carolina and Virginia. The railroad has been owned by Gulf and Ohio Railways since 1994.

== History ==
The Laurinburg & Southern was formed on March 4, 1909 as the Laurinburg & Southern Railroad Company and began operations in July over a line from Laurinburg to Wagram. Additional trackage was purchased from the Aberdeen & Rockfish into Raeford in 1921.

In addition to rail services over the 28 miles (45 km) between Laurinburg and Raeford, the Laurinburg & Southern expanded to include several other shortline railroads in North Carolina and one operation in Virginia. Acquisitions included the Fairmont & Western and Red Springs & Northern in 1984, the Franklin County Railroad and Nash County Railroad in 1985, as well as the Saltville Railroad in Virginia from 1982. The Yadkin Valley Railroad would begin operations in 1989 under L&S control.

Upon the 1994 acquisition of the Laurinburg & Southern holding company by Gulf & Ohio the railroad had been reduced to owning only its namesake line and two others, the Nash County railroad and Yadkin Valley Railroad. The other railroads had been abandoned or were out of service. The Yadkin Valley railroad and the Laurinburg & Southern are still operated by Gulf & Ohio. The former Nash County Railroad was sold in 2011 and now operates under the CLNA reporting mark.

== Traffic ==
L&S moves 7,500 cars annually serving four industries utilizing three locomotives. The following items are currently shipped on the L&S:

- Feed Ingredients
- Soda Ash
- Lime
- Fertilizer
- Chemicals
- Glass

L&S has an interchange with CSX in Laurinburg, North Carolina. It formerly had an interchange with Aberdeen and Rockfish Railroad in Raeford, North Carolina.

== Embargo ==
Aerial imagery suggests that the track between Sawmill Road in Raeford and Shaw Currie Road near Laurinburg has been embargoed for many years, with no evidence of maintenance-of-way activity. All signal light housings have been turned in at road crossings along this segment that feature them, and the tracks often disappear into thick patches of young pine trees growing between the ties. Major washouts are apparent at the crossings of Raft Swamp and Big Middle Swamp; the condition of the bridge over the Lumber River near Wagram is unknown, but would likely require significant rehabilitation or replacement to safely carry freight. Due to the high cost associated with reactivation, the lack of potential customers along the line, and the proximity of the superior CSX S and A lines for traffic moving north/south, it is highly unlikely that this large stretch of the LRS will ever carry a train again.

== See also ==
- Gulf and Ohio Railways
- Aberdeen and Rockfish Railroad
