= Parkton =

Parkton may refer to a location in the United States:

- Parkton, Maryland
- Parkton, Minnesota
- Parkton, North Carolina
