= Red Springs & Northern Railroad =

Railroad in North Carolina

The Red Springs & Northern Railroad is a 13-mile short-line railroad extending from Parkton to Red Springs, in southeastern North Carolina. It connects with major carrier CSX Transportation in Parkton. The line was originally constructed by the Cape Fear & Yadkin Valley Railroad to the South Carolina state line near McColl, South Carolina, in 1883-1885. The trackage became the Atlantic Coast Line's "Bennettsville Branch" in 1898. The portion of the route from Red Springs to McColl was removed in 1973. ACL-successor CSX abandoned the remainder of the line in the 1980s.

== Revival ==
The Advancement Corporation, a regional economic development board, subsequently bought the line in 1984, named it Red Springs & Northern Railroad, and contracted with nearby Laurinburg and Southern Railroad to provide rail service. Freight operations continued sporadically until 1990, after which the tracks entered dormancy. Finally, in 2004 ownership of the railroad was transferred from Advancement, Inc. to the Red Springs & Northern Foundation. The Foundation is a 501c3 tax-exempt corporation, with goals of revitalizing the line and attracting an operator to restore rail service to Red Springs.
