= Five Points, North Carolina =

- Census-designated place
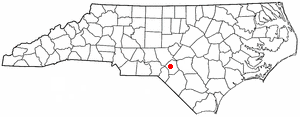
- Location of Five Points, North Carolina
- Coordinates: 35°00′44″N 79°22′48″W
- Country: United States
- State: North Carolina
- County: Hoke

Area
  - Total: 8.28 sq mi (21.45 km^{2})
  - Land: 8.28 sq mi (21.45 km^{2})
  - Water: 0 sq mi (0.00 km^{2})
- Elevation: 364 ft (111 m)

Population (2020)
  - Total: 961
  - Density: 116.1/sq mi (44.81/km^{2})
- Time zone: UTC-5 (Eastern (EST))
  - Summer (DST): UTC-4 (EDT)
- ZIP code: 28376
- Area codes: 910, 472
- FIPS code: 37-23520
- GNIS feature ID: 2402486

Five Points is a census-designated place (CDP) in Hoke County, North Carolina, United States. As of the 2020 census, Five Points had a population of 961.

== Geography ==
Five Points is located in western Hoke County. The original "Five Points" is the intersection of Calloway Road, Montrose Road, and N. Horace Walters Road, 8 miles (13 km) northwest of Raeford, the Hoke county seat. The Five Points CDP extends east as far as North Carolina Highway 211 and west to Pendergrass Road and Mountain Creek.

According to the United States Census Bureau, the CDP has a total area of 8.3 square miles (21.4 km^{2}), all of it land. The community is drained by Mountain Creek, Little Creek, and Buffalo Creek, all southwest-flowing tributaries of Drowning Creek, the upstream name of the Lumber River.

== Demographics ==
Historical population
Census	Pop.	Note	%±
2020	961		—
U.S. Decennial Census

As of the census of 2000, there were 306 people, 113 households, and 91 families residing in the CDP. The population density was 57.2 inhabitants per square mile (22.1/km^{2}). There were 125 housing units at an average density of 23.4/sq mi (9.0/km^{2}). The racial makeup of the CDP was 59.15% White, 34.97% African American, 5.56% Native American, 0.33% from other races. Hispanic or Latino of any race were 3.27% of the population.

There were 113 households, out of which 38.1% had children under the age of 18 living with them, 50.4% were married couples living together, 21.2% had a female householder with no husband present, and 18.6% were non-families. 15.9% of all households were made up of individuals, and 5.3% had someone living alone who was 65 years of age or older. The average household size was 2.71 and the average family size was 2.91.

In the CDP, the population was spread out, with 27.5% under the age of 18, 12.7% from 18 to 24, 29.1% from 25 to 44, 20.6% from 45 to 64, and 10.1% who were 65 years of age or older. The median age was 32 years. For every 100 females, there were 104.0 males. For every 100 females age 18 and over, there were 93.0 males.

The median income for a household in the CDP was $51,313, and the median income for a family was $45,729. Males had a median income of $14,796 versus $18,958 for females. The per capita income for the CDP was $14,872. About 7.0% of families and 9.9% of the population were below the poverty line, including 19.0% of those under the age of 18 and none of those 65 or over.
