= Ted Thomas Sr. =

American cleric

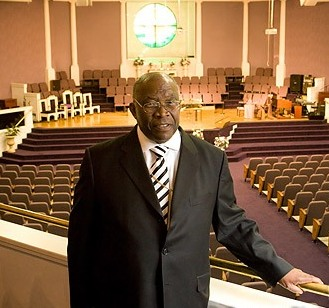
- Church: Pentecostal
- Archdiocese: Virginia First Jurisdiction, COGIC
- In office: 1984–2020
- Predecessor: Bishop David C. Love
- Successor: Bishop Marc A. Thomas Sr. (as bishop of the Virginia First Jurisdiction and Pastor of New Community Temple COGIC) Rev. Bruce E. Hughes (as pastor of the St. Stephen's COGIC)
- Previous posts: Pastor; Ecclesiastical Administrative Assistant; Ecclesiastical Superintendent; Secretary to the Board of Bishops; General Board Member, COGIC

Orders
- Ordination: 1959
- Consecration: 1984

Personal details
- Born: October 19, 1935 Raeford, North Carolina, U.S.
- Died: June 24, 2020 (aged 84) Suffolk, Virginia, U.S.
- Spouse: Charletta Virginia Clifton Thomas
- Children: 6 children and 11 grandchildren

Bishop Ted Gera Thomas Sr. (October 19, 1935 – June 24, 2020) was an American cleric with the Church of God in Christ (COGIC) who was consecrated to be the Jurisdictional Prelate of the Historic First Ecclesiastical Jurisdiction of Virginia, one of the largest dioceses/jurisdictions of the COGIC in Virginia.

== Background ==
Born in Raeford, North Carolina, his parents were the late Simuel Thomas Sr. and Nancy Thomas. He was the seventh of seven children. He was married to Charletta C. Thomas, and they had six children, Ted Jr., Christopher, Marc, Charles, Jonathan, and Reuben, and several grandchildren, Charles Jr., Emmanuel, Kiara, Marc Jr., Evan, Aaron, Ted Jr., Na'ami, and Marson.

== Education ==
Bishop Thomas was a graduate of Norfolk State University, with a Bachelor of Science degree in Mathematics; Hampton University, Master of Science degree in Mathematics; and Trinity Hall College, with a Doctor of Divinity Degree. He completed further studies at Moody Bible Institute, Chicago, Illinois; Old Dominion University, Norfolk, Virginia; University of Virginia, Charlottesville, Virginia; Virginia Polytechnic University, Blacksburg, Virginia; College of William & Mary, Williamsburg, Virginia.

== COGIC clergyman ==
Licensed to preach in 1959, Ted Thomas Sr. served the Church of God in Christ in varying capacities as a minister of music, pastor of several COGIC churches in Virginia, a church musician (Hammond Organ, piano, and drums), a State Sunday School Superintendent, a District Superintendent, and an Administrative Assistant to the famed COGIC minister and Bishop David C. Love before being elevated to Jurisdictional Prelate of the Virginia First Jurisdiction in 1984. After his consecration as a bishop, Thomas was elected to be the Secretary of the Board of Bishops, COGIC; a position which he held for 20 years. In addition to heading "VA#1" (the nickname for the COGIC Virginia First Jurisdiction), Bishop Thomas served as pastor of New Community Temple COGIC (the headquarters church of the jurisdiction) in Portsmouth, Virginia, and St. Stephen's COGIC in Virginia Beach, Virginia.

After Thomas became jurisdictional prelate the jurisdiction expanded from seventeen churches in 1984 to more than 50 as of 2012, extending from Manassas, Virginia, in the north, to South Hampton Roads in the south, and Roanoke, Virginia, in the west.

In 2008, Bishop Thomas was appointed to the Judiciary Board of the Church of God in Christ by Bishop Charles Blake. In 2012, Bishop Thomas announced his campaign to run for the General Board of the Church of God in Christ. He was officially elected to the General Board on November 12, 2012. He served on the General Board for 8 years until his death in 2020.

== Bishop Thomas and New Community Temple COGIC ==
In 1967, Elder J. L. Clifton (New Community's founder and his father-in-law) relocated to Salisbury, Maryland. Elder Ted Thomas Sr. was appointed by Bishop David C. Love to lead the fledgling congregation. The membership grew, necessitating the construction of an additional wing to the modest sanctuary. With a limited operating budget, Elder Thomas oversaw and participated in the construction. Following his appointment to the bishopric in 1984 and the designation of New Community Temple COGIC as the Jurisdictional Headquarters, another wing was added to the sanctuary; again, overseeing and participating in construction. The jurisdiction further grew under Bishop Thomas' leadership necessitating a third addition to the Jurisdictional Headquarters.

By 2002, the Jurisdiction had long outgrown the New Community Temple sanctuary, and, as recourse, held its Holy Convocations in one of the nearby public school auditoriums. In 2002, Bishop Thomas began plans for a new edifice to house the Historic First Ecclesiastical Jurisdiction of Virginia which would be called New Community Temple COGIC and Christian Center. He built the Christian Center first, tore down the original church facility, and erected the Temple as it stands today in the Churchland borough of Portsmouth, Virginia.

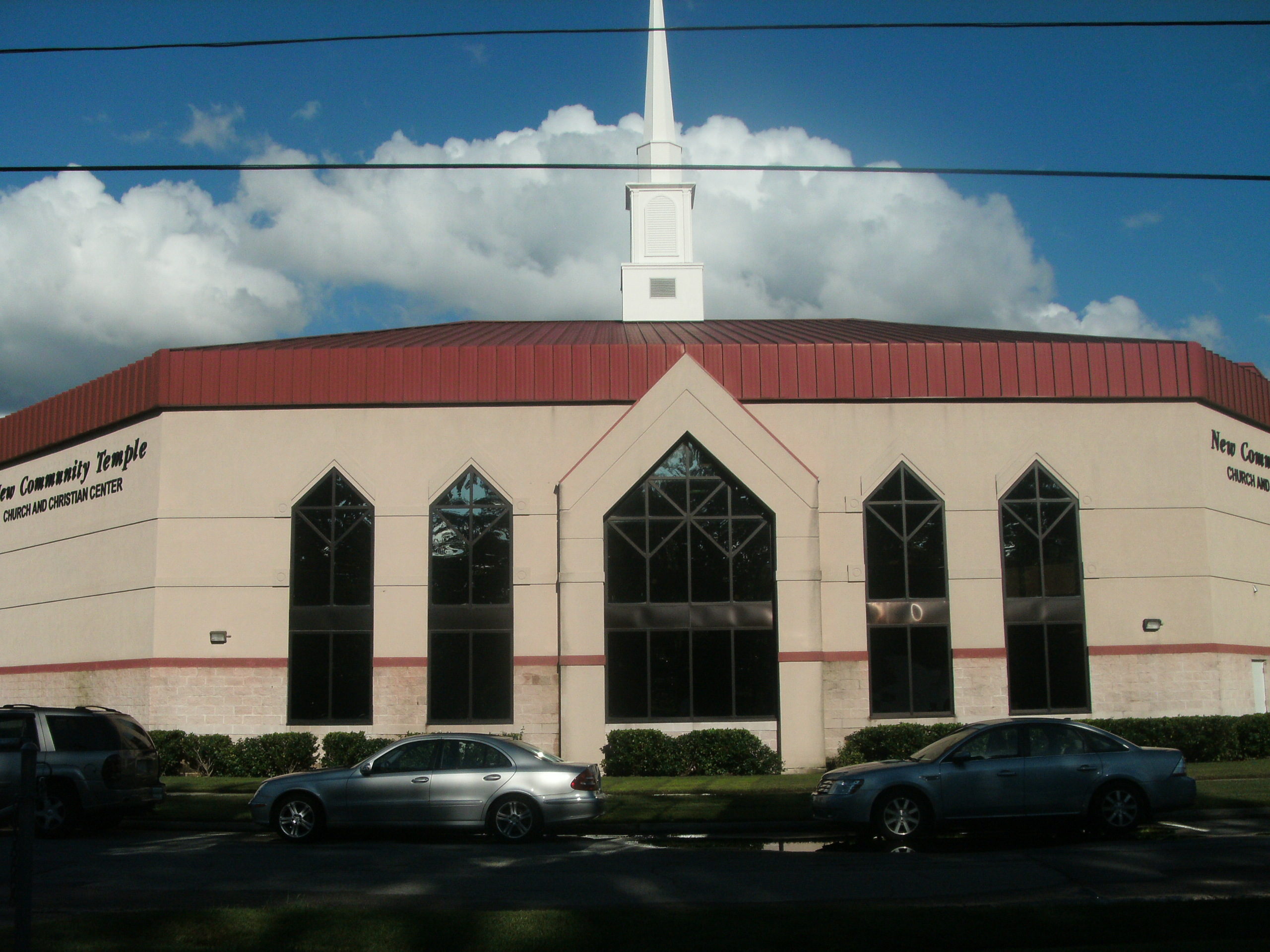
New Community Temple COGIC

== Secular career ==
Thomas retired from a career with Norfolk Public Schools, where he was a mathematics teacher and eventually a school principal and administrator. He also served on the Advisory Board of the Bank of the Commonwealth in Virginia and was a co-proprietor of the Carver Memorial Cemetery in Suffolk, VA.

== Death ==
Thomas died on June 24, 2020, at the age of 84. He was succeeded by his son, Bishop Marc A. Thomas, Sr. as the Prelate and Bishop of the COGIC Virginia First Jurisdiction and pastor of the New Community Temple COGIC in Portsmouth, and by Reverend Bruce E. Hughes, Sr. as the pastor of the St. Stephen's COGIC in Virginia Beach. His wife died on July 21, 2020, almost less than one month after him, after a long battle with various illnesses. His oldest son, Ted Jr., who was a popular Soul, Gospel, and R&B percussionist and drummer, also died the following month on August 15, 2020, also after a long battle with various illnesses.

== Sources ==
1. http://www.nctcogic.org

2. http://www.yeshuacogic.org

3. http://www.heraldofhiscomingcogic.net

4. http://www.ntccogic.org/firstjurisdiction.htm

5. https://web.archive.org/web/20090628185018/http://www.bankofthecommonwealth.com/about_directors.php

Preceded by Bishop David C. Love	Prelate, Historic First Ecclesiastical Jurisdiction of Virginia, COGIC; 1984–2020 (his death)	Succeeded by Bishop Marc A. Thomas, Sr.
Preceded by Superintendent Junius L. Clifton	Senior Pastor, New Community Temple COGIC; 1967–2020 (his death)	Succeeded by Bishop Marc A. Thomas, Sr.
Preceded by Elder Thurlian Burden	Senior Pastor, St. Stephen's COGIC; 1991–2020 (his death)	Succeeded by Rev. Bruce E. Hughes, Sr.
