= Raeford Historic District =

Historic district in North Carolina, United States

- U.S. National Register of Historic Places
- U.S. Historic district
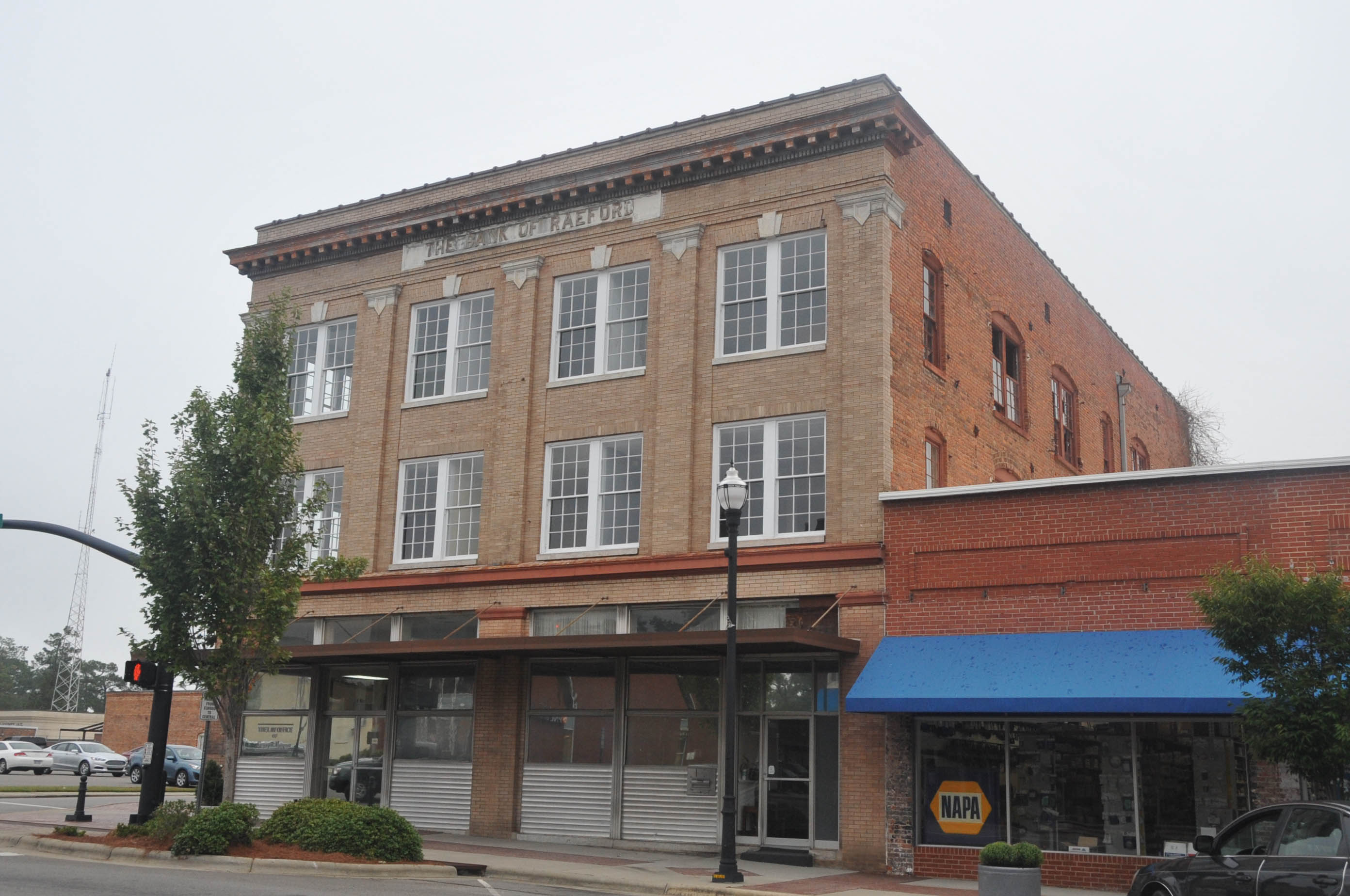
- Bank of Raeford (1911), Raeford Historic District, March 2007

- Location within North Carolina Location within the United States
- Location: Roughly bounded by Jackson St., E. Central Ave., the Aberdeen and Rockfish, and E and W Elwood Ave., Raeford, North Carolina
- Coordinates: 34°58′42″N 79°13′22″W
- Area: 23 acres (9.3 ha)
- Built: 1897
- Architect: Dew, Marcus
- Architectural style: Queen Anne, Colonial Revival
- NRHP reference No.: 06000690
- Added to NRHP: August 9, 2006

Raeford Historic District is a national historic district in Raeford, Hoke County, North Carolina. The district encompasses 48 contributing buildings and two contributing structures in the central business district of Raeford. The commercial and institutional buildings, residences, and transportation-related resources include notable examples of Queen Anne and Colonial Revival-style architecture built after 1897. Notable buildings include the B.R. and Margaret Gatlin House (c. 1903), J.W. and Christina McLauchlin House (c. 1905), Raeford Furniture Company (c. 1925), Hoke Drug (c. 1911), Bank of Raeford (1911), Aberdeen & Rockfish Railroad Passenger Depot (c. 1910, 1942), Johnson-Thomas Building (c. 1900, 1955), and Davis Sinclair Station (c. 1956).

It was listed on the National Register of Historic Places in 2006.
