= SandHoke Early College =

Early college school in North Carolina, United States

Coordinates: 35°13′12″N 79°24′21″W

SandHoke Early College (SHECHS) is an early college school in North Carolina, United States. The name "Sandhoke" is a portmanteau of "Sandhills", the community college system located in Moore county, and "Hoke", the county name. The school is in Hoke County.

SHECHS started as a pilot program in 2007 which roughly 50 students enter the school for five years. The primary purpose of the school is to allow students considered "first generation" college students or at risk to obtain a 2 year degree. The students agree to attend for five years in order to receive both a high school diploma and associate degree; in practice the majority of high school students receive their diploma and their associates degree in four years. The students attend a Hoke campus for three years to complete all high school courses. During this time they also begin taking college courses through Sandhills Community College. Since its inception, SHECHS has grown to accept 100-125 applicants a year, making it one of the largest early college programs in North Carolina. College courses begin in sophomore year. Senior year is spent on the Sandhills Community College campus, located in Pinehurst, NC. SHECHS students participate in a wide array of sports offered by Hoke County Schools. The schools current rating is an "A" school in North Carolina's school grading system.
