= Dundarrach, North Carolina =

- Census-designated place
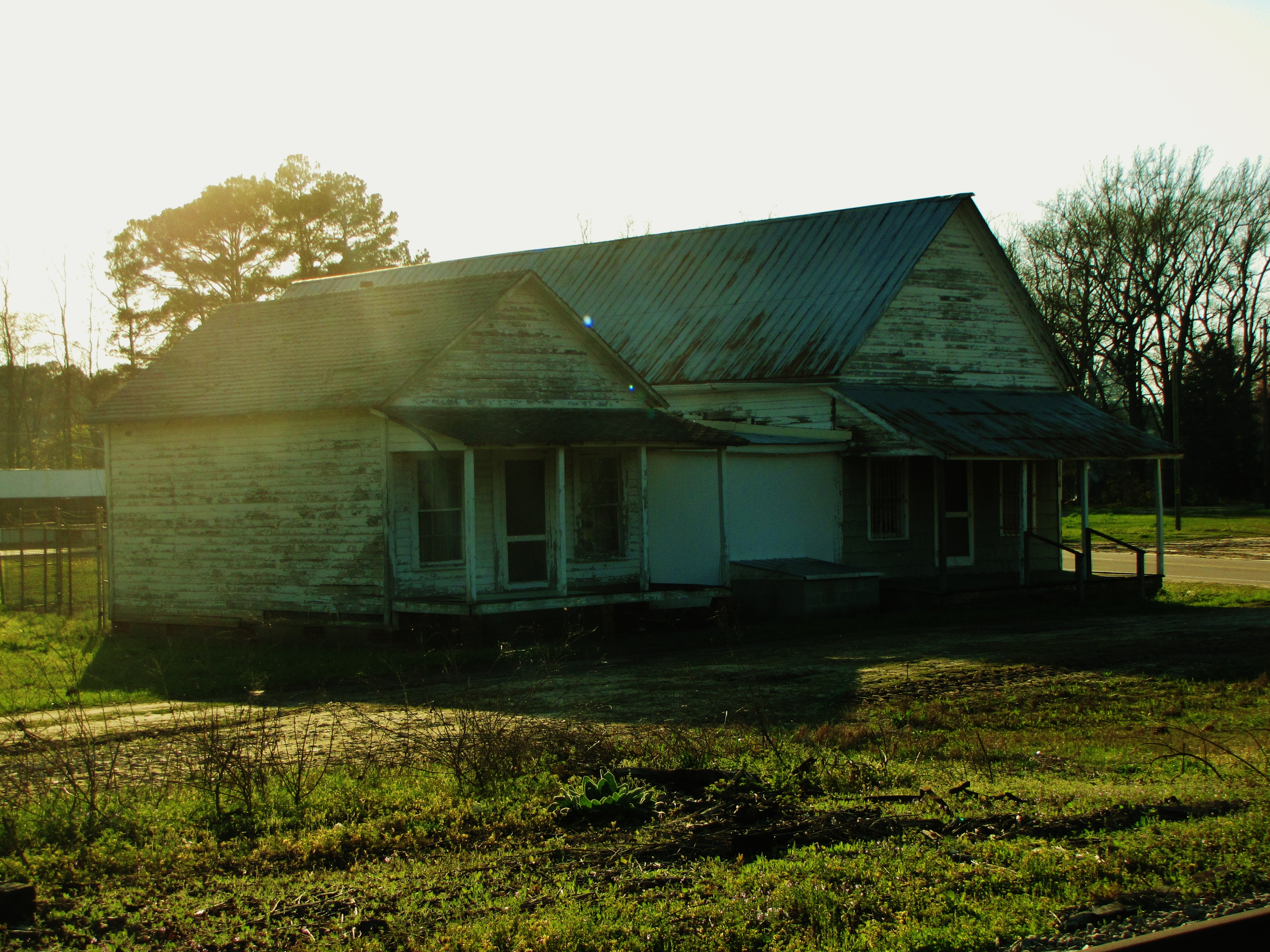

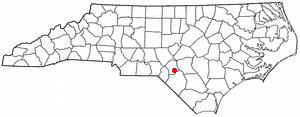
- Location of Dundarrach, North Carolina
- Coordinates: 34°55′29″N 79°09′27″W
- Country: United States
- State: North Carolina
- County: Hoke

Area
  - Total: 1.32 sq mi (3.41 km^{2})
  - Land: 1.32 sq mi (3.41 km^{2})
  - Water: 0 sq mi (0.00 km^{2})
- Elevation: 220 ft (67 m)

Population (2020)
  - Total: 34
  - Density: 25.8/sq mi (9.97/km^{2})
- Time zone: UTC-5 (Eastern (EST))
  - Summer (DST): UTC-4 (EDT)
- FIPS code: 37-18300
- GNIS feature ID: 2402416

Dundarrach is a census-designated place (CDP) in Hoke County, North Carolina, United States. As of the 2020 census, Dundarrach had a population of 34.

== Geography ==
Dundarrach is located in southeastern Hoke County along North Carolina Highway 20, which leads northwest 5 miles (8 km) to Raeford, the county seat, and southeast the same distance to Lumber Bridge.

According to the United States Census Bureau, the Dundarrach CDP has a total area of 1.3 square miles (3.4 km^{2}), all of it land.

== Demographics ==
Historical population
| Census | Pop. | Note | %± |
|---|---|---|---|
| 2020 | 34 | | — |
U.S. Decennial Census

As of the census of 2000, 62 people, 25 households, and 19 families resided in the CDP. The population density was 39.7 inhabitants per square mile (15.3/km^{2}). The 31 housing units averaged 19.8/sq mi (7.7/km^{2}). The racial makeup of the CDP was 69.35% White, 11.29% African American, and 19.35% Native American. Hispanics or Latinos of any race were 9.68% of the population.

Of the 25 households, 32.0% had children under the age of 18 living with them, 48.0% were married couples living together, 28.0% had a female householder with no husband present, and 24.0% were not families. About 20.0% of all households were made up of individuals, and 12.0% had someone living alone who was 65 years of age or older. The average household size was 2.48 and the average family size was 2.74.

In the CDP, the population was distributed as 22.6% under the age of 18, 4.8% from 18 to 24, 35.5% from 25 to 44, 16.1% from 45 to 64, and 21.0% who were 65 years of age or older. The median age was 38 years. For every 100 females, there were 100.0 males. For every 100 females age 18 and over, there were 84.6 males.

The median income for a household in the CDP was $4,659, and for a family was $16,250. Males had a median income of $0 versus $0 for females. The per capita income for the CDP was $6,975. No families and 39.3% of the population were living below the poverty line, including none under 18 and 57.9% of those over 64.
