= Puppy Creek Plantation =

Historic house in North Carolina, United States

- U.S. National Register of Historic Places
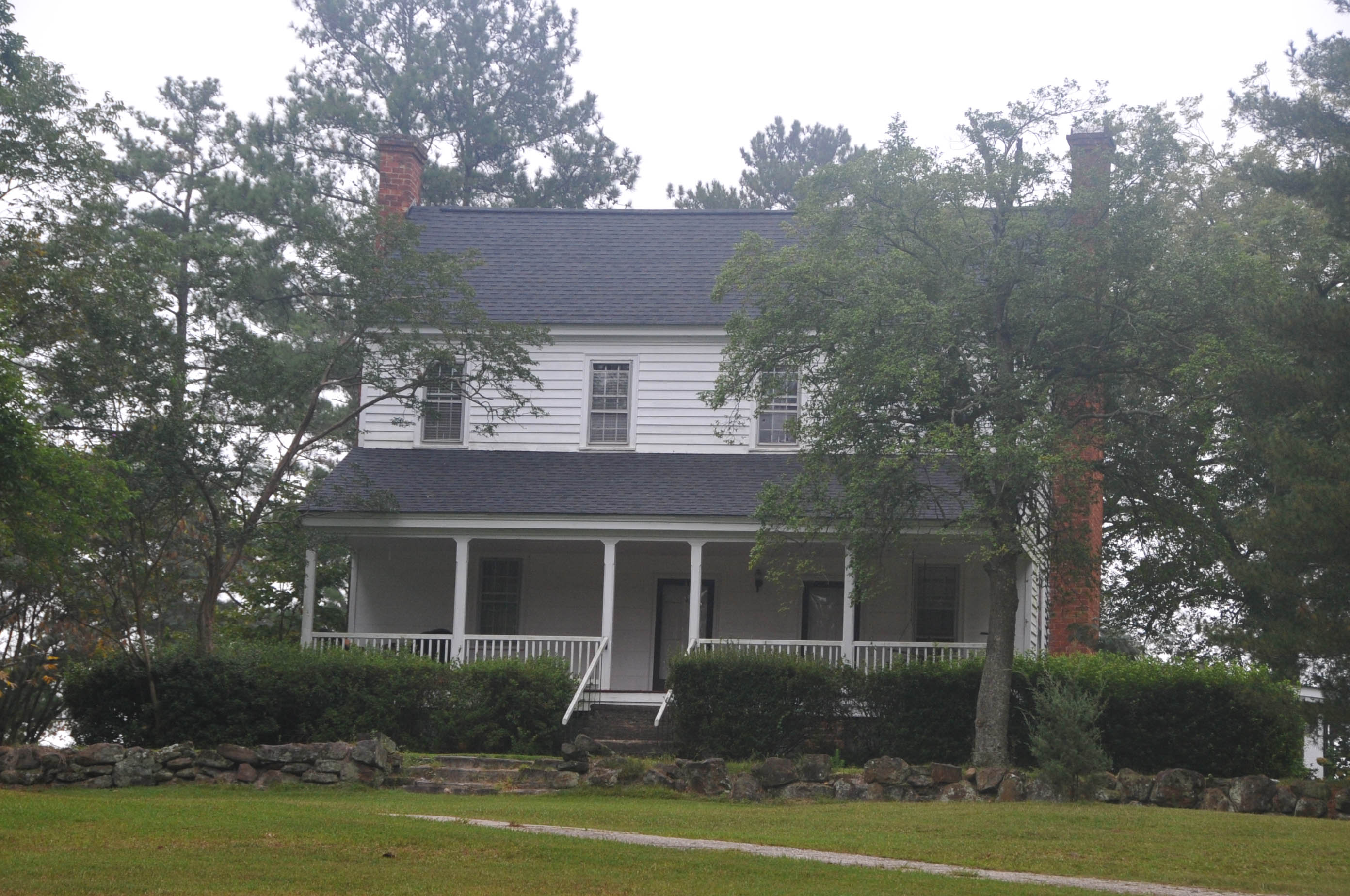
- Puppy Creek Plantation, March 2007

- Location within North Carolina Location within the United States
- Location: NW of Rockfish on SR 1409, near Rockfish, North Carolina
- Coordinates: 35°1′15″N 79°7′45″W
- Area: 1 acre (0.40 ha)
- Built: c. 1821
- Architectural style: Federal
- NRHP reference No.: 76001329
- Added to NRHP: December 12, 1976

Puppy Creek Plantation, also known as the McGregor-Lamont House, is a historic plantation house located near Rockfish, Hoke County, North Carolina. It was built about 1821, and is a two-story, three-bay, Federal style frame dwelling. It is sheathed in weatherboard, has a gable roof, and sits on a high brick pier foundation. It features exterior end brick chimneys and full-width front porch.

It was listed on the National Register of Historic Places in 1976.

The McGregor-Lamont House is likely the site of a wedding referred to by North Carolina writer Charles W. Chesnutt in his conjure tale "The Marked Tree," first published in the journal The Crisis.
