= Long Street Church =

Historic church in North Carolina, United States

- U.S. National Register of Historic Places
- Location within North Carolina Location within the United States
- Location: W of Fayetteville on SR 1300, near Fayetteville, North Carolina
- Coordinates: 35°7′20″N 79°7′13″W
- Area: 6 acres (2.4 ha)
- Built: c. 1850
- Architectural style: Classical Revival
- NRHP reference No.: 74001353
- Added to NRHP: January 21, 1974

Long Street Church is a historic Presbyterian church located near Fayetteville in Hoke County, North Carolina. It was built in 1850, and is a two-story rectangular frame building five bays wide and three deep. It is set on fieldstone and concrete foundation piers and has a hip roof. The front facade features a full height porch and Palladian window in the Classical Revival style. In 1921 the United States Government purchased the church and six acres of land as part of the Fort Bragg Military Reservation.

It was listed on the National Register of Historic Places in 1974.
