= Bowmore, North Carolina =

- Census-designated place
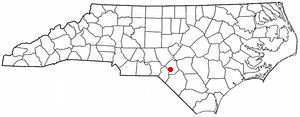
- Location of Bowmore, North Carolina
- Coordinates: 34°56′09″N 79°18′00″W
- Country: United States
- State: North Carolina
- County: Hoke

Area
  - Total: 3.32 sq mi (8.59 km^{2})
  - Land: 3.32 sq mi (8.59 km^{2})
  - Water: 0 sq mi (0.00 km^{2})
- Elevation: 249 ft (76 m)

Population (2020)
  - Total: 76
  - Density: 22.9/sq mi (8.85/km^{2})
- Time zone: UTC-5 (Eastern (EST))
  - Summer (DST): UTC-4 (EDT)
- ZIP code: 28376
- Area codes: 910, 472
- FIPS code: 37-07400
- GNIS feature ID: 2402708

Bowmore is an unincorporated community and census-designated place (CDP) in Hoke County, North Carolina, United States. As of the 2020 census, Bowmore had a population of 76.

== Geography ==
Bowmore is located in southwestern Hoke County along U.S. Route 401, which leads northeast 5 miles (8 km) to Raeford, the county seat, and southwest the same distance to Wagram.

According to the United States Census Bureau, the Bowmore CDP has a total area of 3.3 square miles (8.6 km^{2}), all of it land.

== Demographics ==
Historical population
Census	Pop.	Note	%±
2000	145		—
2010	103		−29.0%
2020	76		−26.2%
U.S. Decennial Census

=== Racial and ethnic composition ===
Bowmore CDP, North Carolina – Racial and ethnic composition Note: the US Census treats Hispanic/Latino as an ethnic category. This table excludes Latinos from the racial categories and assigns them to a separate category. Hispanics/Latinos may be of any race.
Race / Ethnicity (NH = Non-Hispanic)	Pop 2000	Pop 2010	Pop 2020	% 2000	% 2010	% 2020
White alone (NH)	32	20	12	22.07%	19.42%	15.79%
Black or African American alone (NH)	84	56	33	57.93%	54.37%	43.42%
Native American or Alaska Native alone (NH)	26	26	15	17.93%	25.24%	19.74%
Asian alone (NH)	0	0	0	0.00%	0.00%	0.00%
Native Hawaiian or Pacific Islander alone (NH)	0	0	1	0.00%	0.00%	1.32%
Other race alone (NH)	0	0	0	0.00%	0.00%	0.00%
Mixed race or Multiracial (NH)	0	1	11	0.00%	0.97%	14.47%
Hispanic or Latino (any race)	3	0	4	2.07%	0.00%	5.26%
Total	145	103	76	100.00%	100.00%	100.00%

=== 2000 census ===
As of the census of 2000, there were 145 people, 60 households, and 42 families residing in the CDP. The population density was 43.2 inhabitants per square mile (16.7/km^{2}). There were 73 housing units at an average density of 21.7/sq mi (8.4/km^{2}). The racial makeup of the CDP was 22.07% White, 57.93% African American, 18.62% Native American, 1.38% from other races. Hispanic or Latino of any race were 2.07% of the population.

There were 60 households, out of which 38.3% had children under the age of 18 living with them, 45.0% were married couples living together, 18.3% had a female householder with no husband present, and 30.0% were non-families. 26.7% of all households were made up of individuals, and 5.0% had someone living alone who was 65 years of age or older. The average household size was 2.42 and the average family size was 2.93.

In the CDP, the population was spread out, with 25.5% under the age of 18, 9.7% from 18 to 24, 27.6% from 25 to 44, 24.8% from 45 to 64, and 12.4% who were 65 years of age or older. The median age was 38 years. For every 100 females, there were 116.4 males. For every 100 females age 18 and over, there were 111.8 males.

The median income for a household in the CDP was $39,125, and the median income for a family was $48,250. Males had a median income of $30,156 versus $16,000 for females. The per capita income for the CDP was $13,807. There were none of the families and 4.2% of the population living below the poverty line, including no under eighteens and none of those over 64.
