= Hoke County Courthouse =

Historic courthouse in North Carolina

- U.S. National Register of Historic Places
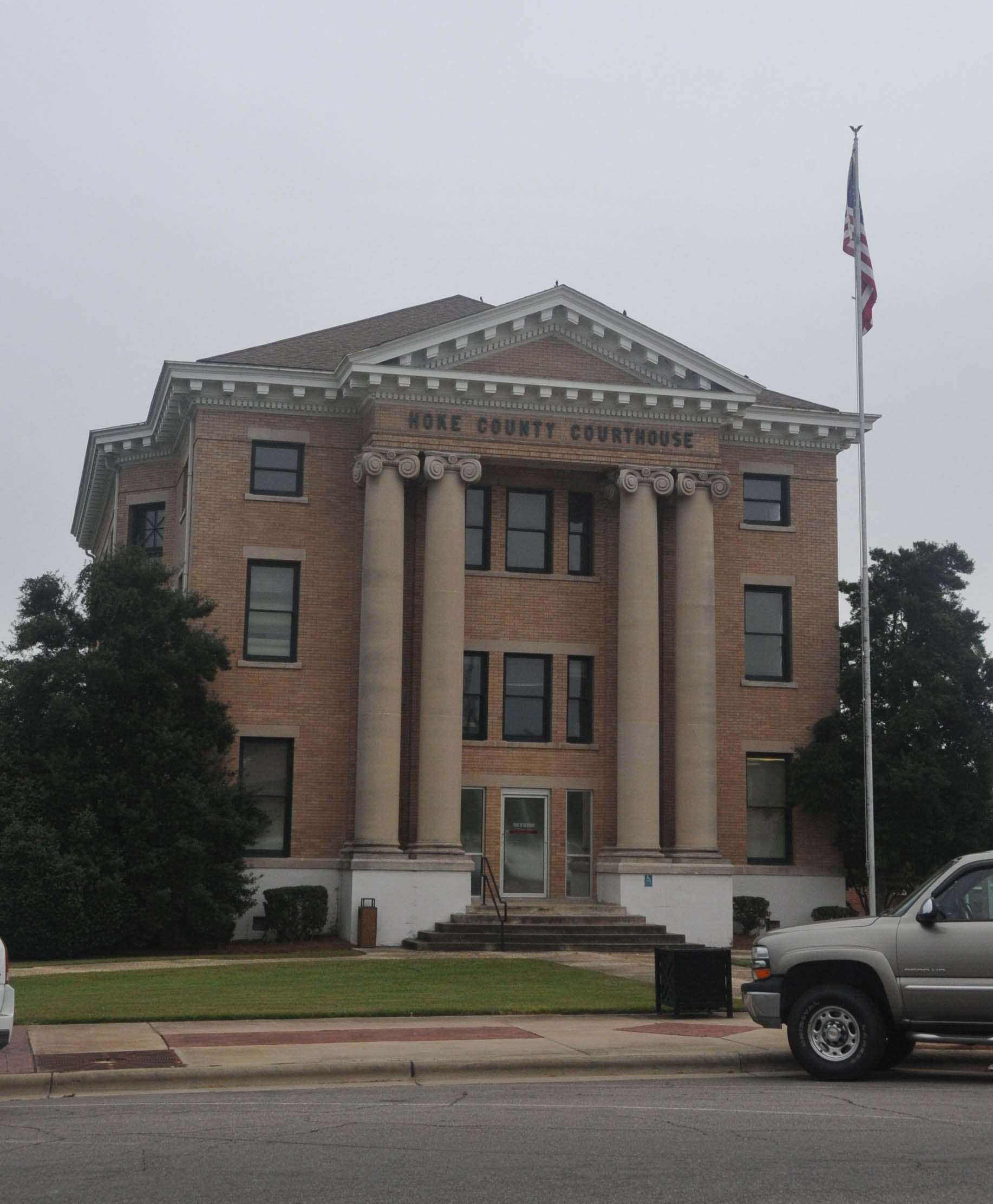
- Hoke County Courthouse, March 2007

- Location within North Carolina Location within the United States
- Location: Main and Edenborough Sts., Raeford, North Carolina
- Coordinates: 34°58′50″N 79°13′19″W
- Area: 1.2 acres (0.49 ha)
- Built: 1912
- Built by: J. A. Jones
- Architect: Milburn, Heister & Company
- Architectural style: Classical Revival
- MPS: North Carolina County Courthouses TR
- NRHP reference No.: 79001725
- Added to NRHP: May 10, 1979

Hoke County Courthouse is a historic courthouse building located at Raeford, Hoke County, North Carolina. It was designed by the architectural firm of Milburn, Heister & Company and built in 1912. It is a three-story Classical Revival-style tan brick building fronted by a tetrastyle pedimented Ionic order portico.

It was listed on the National Register of Historic Places in 1979.
