= Rockfish Creek (Cape Fear River tributary) =

Stream in North Carolina, USA

Rockfish Creek Tributary to Cape Fear River
- Location of Rockfish Creek mouth Rockfish Creek (Cape Fear River tributary) (the United States)

Location
- Country: United States
- State: North Carolina
- County: Cumberland; Hoke; Moore
- City: Hope Mills; Raeford; Southern Pines

Physical characteristics
- Source: Aberdeen Creek divide
  - location: about 2 miles northeast of Aberdeen, North Carolina
  - coordinates: 35°08′41″N 079°22′46″W
  - elevation: 440 ft (130 m)
- Mouth: Cape Fear River
  - location: about 3 miles southeast of Fayetteville, North Carolina
  - coordinates: 34°58′06″N 078°49′11″W
  - elevation: 41 ft (12 m)
- Length: 47.40 mi (76.28 km)
- Basin size: 309.41 square miles (801.4 km^{2})
- Discharge
  - location: Cape Fear River
  - average: 324.92 cu ft/s (9.201 m^{3}/s) at mouth with Cape Fear River

Basin features
- Progression: Cape Fear River → Atlantic Ocean
- River system: Cape Fear River
- Tributaries
  - left: Piney Bottom Creek; Calf Branch; Juniper Creek; Nicholson Creek; Beaver Creek; Gully Branch; Stewarts Branch; Little Rockfish Creek; Big Sandy Run
  - right: Wolf Creek; Gum Branch; Field Branch; Cabin Branch; Mill Creek; Peddlers Branch
- Waterbodies: Upchurches Pond
- Bridges: Fort Bragg Road, King Road, numerous unnamed roads in Fort Bragg, Plank Road, N Vass Road, US 401-Bypass, US 401-Business, Golf Course Road, Rockfish Road, NC 59, Calico Street, I-95, Research Drive, I-95, NC 87

Rockfish Creek is a 47.40 mi (76.28 km) long 5th order tributary to the Cape Fear River in Cumberland County, North Carolina.

== Course ==
Rockfish Creek rises about 2 miles northeast of Aberdeen, North Carolina in Moore County. The creek then flows southeast to Hoke County and Fort Bragg and then east into Cumberland County to join the Cape Fear River about 3 miles southeast of Fayetteville.

== Watershed ==
Rockfish Creek drains 309.41 square miles (801.4 km^{2}) of area, receives about 47.8 in/year of precipitation, has a wetness index of 495.45 and is about 30% forested.

== See also ==
- List of rivers of North Carolina
