= Ashley Heights, North Carolina =

- Census-designated place
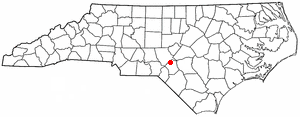
- Location of Ashley Heights, North Carolina
- Coordinates: 35°05′07″N 79°22′56″W
- Country: United States
- State: North Carolina
- County: Hoke

Area
  - Total: 2.24 sq mi (5.79 km^{2})
  - Land: 2.24 sq mi (5.79 km^{2})
  - Water: 0 sq mi (0.00 km^{2})
- Elevation: 417 ft (127 m)

Population (2020)
  - Total: 301
  - Density: 134.6/sq mi (51.97/km^{2})
- Time zone: UTC-5 (Eastern (EST))
  - Summer (DST): UTC-4 (EDT)
- ZIP code: 28315
- Area codes: 910, 472
- FIPS code: 37-02240
- GNIS feature ID: 2402653

Ashley Heights is an unincorporated community and census-designated place (CDP) in Hoke County, North Carolina, United States. The population was 301 at the 2020 census.

== Geography ==
Ashley Heights is located in northwestern Hoke County along North Carolina Highway 211, which leads northwest 5 miles (8 km) to Aberdeen and southeast 12 miles (19 km) to Raeford, the Hoke county seat. The community is in the Sandhills region of North Carolina and is bordered to the east by Fort Bragg.

According to the United States Census Bureau, the CDP has a total area of 2.22 square miles (5.75 km^{2}), all of it recorded as land.

== Demographics ==
Historical population
Census	Pop.	Note	%±
2020	301		—
U.S. Decennial Census

As of the census of 2000, there were 341 people, 120 households, and 101 families residing in the CDP. The population density was 141.2 inhabitants per square mile (54.5/km^{2}). There were 132 housing units at an average density of 54.7 per square mile (21.1/km^{2}). The racial makeup of the CDP was 58.36% White, 22.58% African American, 13.49% Native American, 1.47% from other races, and 4.11% from two or more races. Hispanic or Latino of any race were 6.74% of the population.

There were 120 households, out of which 38.3% had children under the age of 18 living with them, 56.7% were married couples living together, 19.2% had a female householder with no husband present, and 15.8% were non-families. 13.3% of all households were made up of individuals, and 5.0% had someone living alone who was 65 years of age or older. The average household size was 2.84 and the average family size was 3.00.

In the CDP, the population was spread out, with 29.3% under the age of 18, 6.5% from 18 to 24, 34.6% from 25 to 44, 21.1% from 45 to 64, and 8.5% who were 65 years of age or older. The median age was 36 years. For every 100 females, there were 106.7 males. For every 100 females age 18 and over, there were 94.4 males.

The median income for a household in the CDP was $32,679, and the median income for a family was $28,000. Males had a median income of $40,938 versus $21,042 for females. The per capita income for the CDP was $16,467. About 22.7% of families and 22.9% of the population were below the poverty line, including 37.0% of those under age 18 and none of those age 65 or over.
