= Hoke County, North Carolina =

County in North Carolina, United States

- County
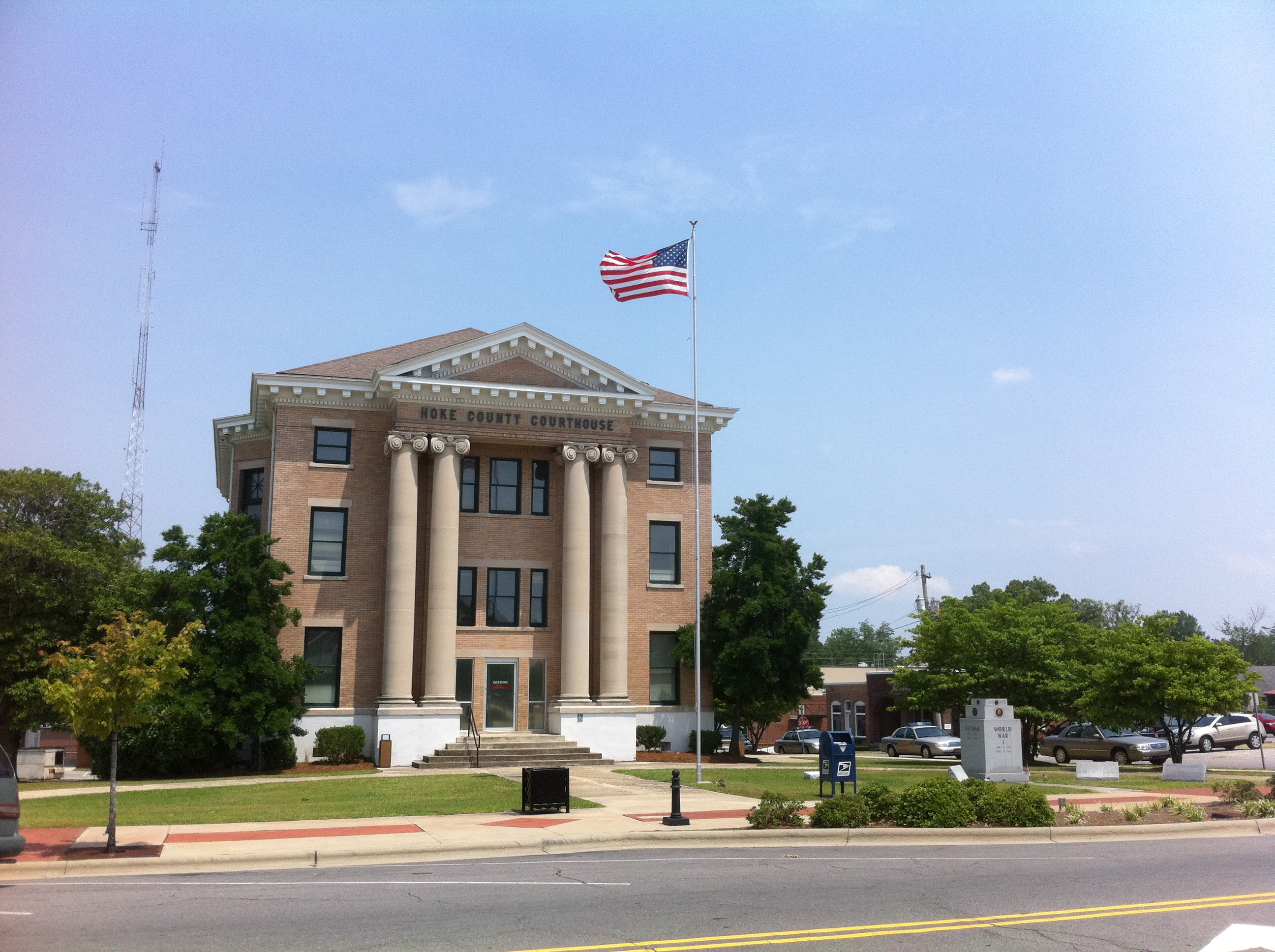
- Hoke County Courthouse in Raeford

- Flag Seal Logo
- Motto: "Where Quality Living Meets Quality of Life"
- Location within the U.S. state of North Carolina
- Interactive map of Hoke County, North Carolina
- Coordinates: 35.017°N 79.24°W
- Country: United States
- State: North Carolina
- Founded: April 1, 1911
- Named for: Robert F. Hoke
- Seat: Raeford
- Largest community: Raeford

Area
  - Total: 391.68 sq mi (1,014.4 km^{2})
  - Land: 390.15 sq mi (1,010.5 km^{2})
  - Water: 1.53 sq mi (4.0 km^{2}) 0.39%

Population (2020)
  - Total: 52,082
  - Estimate (2025): 56,939 ▲
  - Density: 133.49/sq mi (51.54/km^{2})
- Time zone: UTC−5 (Eastern)
  - Summer (DST): UTC−4 (EDT)
- Congressional district: 9th
- Website: www.hokecounty.net

Hoke County is a county in the U.S. state of North Carolina. As of the 2020 census, its population was 52,082. Its county seat is Raeford.

The county is home to part of the Fort Bragg military reservation.

== History ==
=== Early history ===
The original inhabitants of the region eventually constituting Hoke County were Tuscarora Native Americans. Ancestors of the Lumbee Native Americans lived in the area in the early 1700s. European settlers began establishing church congregations in the area in the mid-to-late 1700s. The area was later placed under the jurisdiction of Cumberland and Robeson counties in the U.S. state of North Carolina. The community of Raeford was formed in the 1890s and incorporated in 1901. In 1899, the Aberdeen and Rockfish Railroad became the first rail line laid through the area.

=== Creation ===
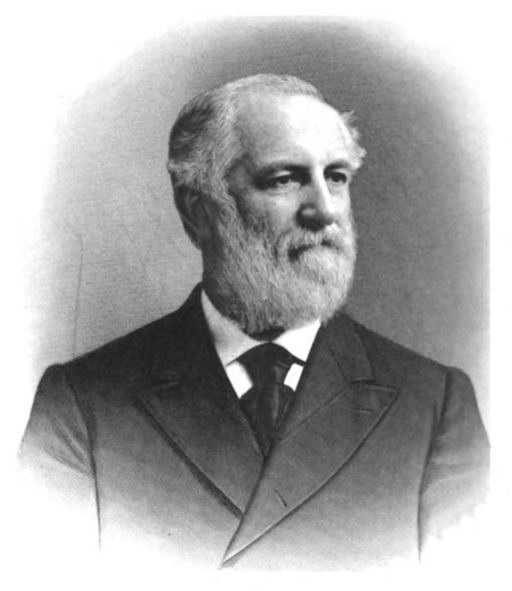
The county was named for Robert F. Hoke.

In the early 1900s, some residents in the far reaches of Cumberland and Robeson began lobbying for the creation of a new county, complaining of long and dangerous travel to their county courthouses. In 1907 and 1909 there were unsuccessful efforts to lobby the state government led by State Senator J. W. McLauchlin to create a new "Glenn County" out of portions of Cumberland and Robeson. In 1911 a third attempt was made and conjoined with an effort to name a county in honor of Robert F. Hoke, a Confederate general in the American Civil War and railroad executive.

On February 14, 1911, the North Carolina General Assembly voted to create the new Hoke County effective April 1 of that year, with its first government to be appointed by the governor of North Carolina pending the holding of an election. Raeford was designated the county seat, and local officials served out of rented office space until a county courthouse was erected the following year. At the time of its creation, Hoke County comprised about 268,000 acres of land. It had no paved roads and its economy was rooted in agriculture. Its approximately 10,000 residents were mostly white descendants of Scottish Highlanders and African Americans.

=== Development ===
About 400 Hoke County residents served in the U.S. Army during World War I. Between 1918 and 1923, the American federal government acquired 92,000 acres of land in the county as part of its efforts to expand Camp Bragg into Fort Bragg. leaving about 150,000 acres leftover. Over 160 Hoke residents served in the armed forces during World War II. After the war, the county's Lumbee population increased. An effort by the U.S. Army to acquire a further 49,000 acres in the county in 1952 for Fort Bragg was abandoned after intense lobbying by local residents. In 1958, Little River Township, a section of north Hoke which was cut off from the rest of the county due to the presence of the Fort Bragg Military Reservation, was moved into the jurisdiction of Moore County. Public schools, which had been originally racially segregated for whites, blacks, and Native Americans, were integrated in the 1960s.

== Geography ==
According to the U.S. Census Bureau, the county has a total area of 391.68 square miles (1,014.4 km^{2}), of which 1.53 sq mi (4.0 km^{2}) (0.39%) are covered by water. It is bordered by Moore, Cumberland, Robeson, Scotland, and Richmond counties. Hoke lies within North Carolina's Sandhills region and Coastal Plain region. It contains several Carolina bays. It drains into the Lumber River basin and Cape Fear River basin. Longleaf pine is native to the region.

=== State and local protected areas ===
- Calloway Forest Preserve
- Hoke Community Forest
- Lumber River State Park (part)
- Nicholson Creek Game Land
- Rockfish Creek Game Land
- Sandhills Game Land (part)

=== Major water bodies ===
- Big Marsh Swamp
- Buffalo Creek
- Drowning Creek
- Gum Swamp
- Little Raft Swamp
- Little River
- Little Rockfish Creek
- Little Rockfish Lake
- Lumber River
- MacArthur Lake
- Mountain Creek
- Quewhiffle Creek
- Raft Swamp
- Rockfish Creek

== Demographics ==
Historical population
Census	Pop.	Note	%±
1920	11,722		—
1930	14,244		21.5%
1940	14,937		4.9%
1950	15,756		5.5%
1960	16,356		3.8%
1970	16,436		0.5%
1980	20,383		24.0%
1990	22,856		12.1%
2000	33,646		47.2%
2010	46,952		39.5%
2020	52,082		10.9%
2025 (est.)	56,939	▲	9.3%
U.S. Decennial Census; 1790–1960 1900–1990; 1990–2000 2010 2020

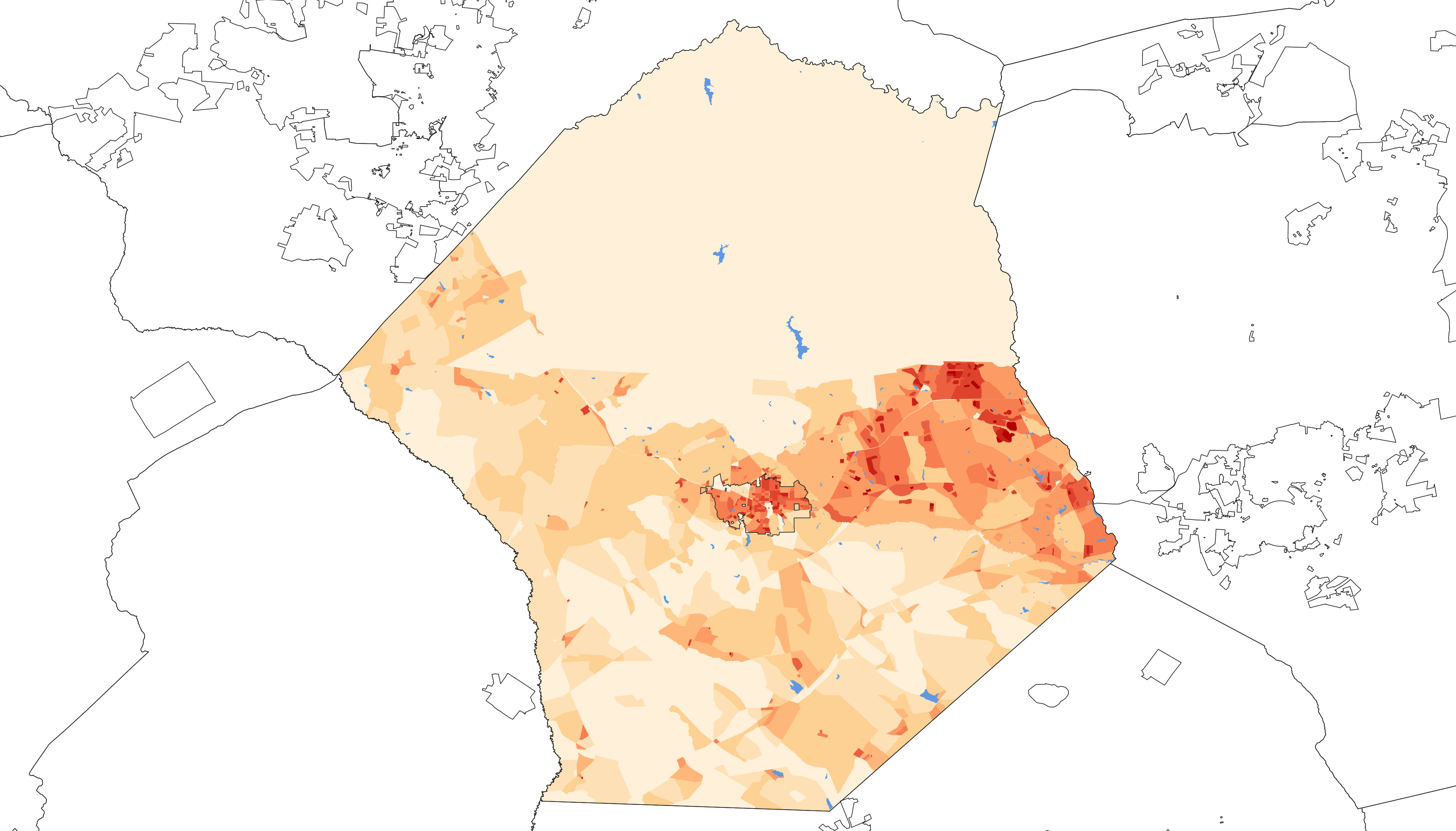
2020 population density of Hoke County NC by census block

=== 2020 census ===
As of the 2020 census, 52,082 people were residing in Hoke County, with Raeford recorded as the largest community. The county had a median age of 33.6 years, with 28.1% of residents under the age of 18 and 11.0% of residents 65 years of age or older, and for every 100 females there were 95.1 males, while for every 100 females age 18 and over there were 91.0 males age 18 and over.

The racial makeup of the county was 40.4% White, 32.2% Black or African American, 7.8% American Indian and Alaska Native, 1.4% Asian, 0.4% Native Hawaiian and Pacific Islander, 7.2% from some other race, and 10.6% from two or more races. Hispanic or Latino residents of any race comprised 14.8% of the population. It is a majority-minority county; Hoke County is part of the Fayetteville, NC Metropolitan Statistical Area.

57.4% of residents lived in urban areas, while 42.6% lived in rural areas.

There were 18,590 households in the county, of which 40.4% had children under the age of 18 living in them. Of all households, 50.3% were married-couple households, 17.0% were households with a male householder and no spouse or partner present, and 26.7% were households with a female householder and no spouse or partner present. About 21.6% of all households were made up of individuals and 7.1% had someone living alone who was 65 years of age or older.

There were 20,083 housing units, of which 7.4% were vacant. Among occupied housing units, 69.5% were owner-occupied and 30.5% were renter-occupied. The homeowner vacancy rate was 2.2% and the rental vacancy rate was 6.1%.

Hoke County's population has risen in recent decades, largely driven by expansions of Fort Bragg. Between 1990 and 2000, the county's population expanded by 47%. From 2000 to 2010, the population grew from about 34,000 to over 45,000 residents. Between the 2010 and 2020 censuses, the county grew by 17.8%, adding 5,130 residents. Proportionately, the White population shrank by 4.9%, while the Hispanic/Latino population expanded by 2.4%. From 2020 to 2021, the population rose faster than the average state rate of demographic growth.

=== Racial and ethnic composition ===
Hoke County, North Carolina – Racial and ethnic composition Note: the US Census treats Hispanic/Latino as an ethnic category. This table excludes Latinos from the racial categories and assigns them to a separate category. Hispanics/Latinos may be of any race.
Race / Ethnicity (NH = Non-Hispanic)	Pop 1980	Pop 1990	Pop 2000	Pop 2010	Pop 2020	% 1980	% 1990	% 2000	% 2010	% 2020
White alone (NH)	8,791	9,556	13,988	19,142	19,667	43.13%	41.81%	41.57%	40.77%	37.76%
Black or African American alone (NH)	8,770	9,840	12,536	15,392	16,385	43.03%	43.05%	37.26%	32.78%	31.46%
Native American or Alaska Native alone (NH)	2,578	3,150	3,797	4,313	3,803	12.65%	13.78%	11.29%	9.19%	7.30%
Asian alone (NH)	37	85	273	467	716	0.18%	0.37%	0.81%	0.99%	1.37%
Native Hawaiian or Pacific Islander alone (NH)	x	x	38	88	189	x	x	0.11%	0.19%	0.36%
Other race alone (NH)	2	7	55	88	336	0.01%	0.03%	0.16%	0.19%	0.65%
Mixed race or Multiracial (NH)	x	x	544	1,639	3,299	x	x	1.62%	3.49%	6.33%
Hispanic or Latino (any race)	205	218	2,415	5,823	7,687	1.01%	0.95%	7.18%	12.40%	14.76%
Total	20,383	22,856	33,646	46,952	52,082	100.00%	100.00%	100.00%	100.00%	100.00%

== Law and government ==
=== Government ===
Hoke County's government is seated in Raeford and led by a five-person county commission.

Hoke County is a member of the Lumber River Council of Governments, a regional planning board representing five counties. The county also has its own soil and water conservation district, led by two elected supervisors. The northern third of the county is a part of the Fort Bragg Military Reservation. It is located in the North Carolina Senate's 24th district, and the North Carolina House of Representatives' 48th district. Hoke is one of the four counties within the jurisdiction of the Lumbee Tribe of North Carolina, and tribal members within the county elect some members of the tribal council.

=== Judicial system ===
Hoke County lies within the bounds of North Carolina's 29th Prosecutorial District, the 19D Superior Court District, and the 19D District Court District. County voters elect a county sheriff and a clerk of superior court.

=== Politics ===
Historical presidential election returns

United States presidential election results for Hoke County, North Carolina
Year	Republican		Democratic		Third party(ies)	
Year	No.	%	No.	%	No.	%
1912	63	8.64%	626	85.87%	40	5.49%
1916	110	12.36%	780	87.64%	0	0.00%
1920	166	11.59%	1,266	88.41%	0	0.00%
1924	141	10.92%	1,146	88.77%	4	0.31%
1928	311	21.23%	1,154	78.77%	0	0.00%
1932	65	3.51%	1,780	96.22%	5	0.27%
1936	141	6.73%	1,953	93.27%	0	0.00%
1940	117	5.79%	1,904	94.21%	0	0.00%
1944	160	8.24%	1,782	91.76%	0	0.00%
1948	142	8.56%	1,339	80.71%	178	10.73%
1952	616	25.92%	1,761	74.08%	0	0.00%
1956	513	20.88%	1,944	79.12%	0	0.00%
1960	596	22.06%	2,106	77.94%	0	0.00%
1964	779	25.68%	2,254	74.32%	0	0.00%
1968	812	17.88%	2,185	48.11%	1,545	34.02%
1972	1,927	56.25%	1,466	42.79%	33	0.96%
1976	920	22.31%	3,186	77.27%	17	0.41%
1980	1,168	25.24%	3,376	72.95%	84	1.82%
1984	2,449	43.14%	3,214	56.61%	14	0.25%
1988	2,020	37.88%	3,281	61.52%	32	0.60%
1992	1,711	27.00%	3,730	58.86%	896	14.14%
1996	1,914	32.28%	3,510	59.20%	505	8.52%
2000	3,439	40.07%	5,017	58.46%	126	1.47%
2004	5,257	47.41%	5,794	52.25%	37	0.33%
2008	6,293	40.27%	9,227	59.05%	107	0.68%
2012	6,819	39.90%	10,076	58.96%	194	1.14%
2016	7,760	42.57%	9,726	53.35%	744	4.08%
2020	9,453	43.69%	11,804	54.55%	382	1.77%
2024	10,547	46.33%	11,896	52.25%	324	1.42%

Hoke County is politically dominated by the Democratic Party. In the 2024 elections, Hoke County voters narrowly favored Democratic candidates.

== Economy ==
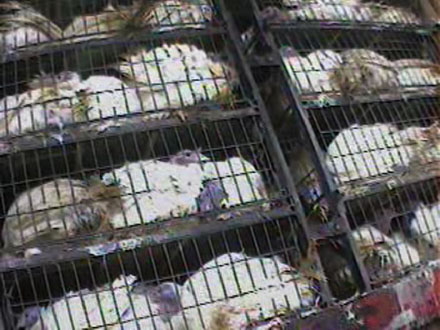
Turkeys in a Hoke poultry processing facility

Hoke County's economy was originally rooted in the lumber and turpentine industries, and over the course of the 20th century expanded to cover the cultivation of cotton and grain crops and eventually the rearing of livestock. Poultry production and processing in particular grew after World War II. The county has experienced economic growth in recent decades due to its proximity to Fort Bragg. Poultry production remains a key part of the local economy.

== Transportation ==
County government supports a public transport bus service, the Hoke Area Transit Service. Local rail transport is provided by the Aberdeen and Rockfish Railroad.

=== Major highways ===
- US 15
- US 401
- US 401 Bus.
- US 501
- NC 20
- NC 211

== Education ==
Most of the county is under the public educational jurisdiction of Hoke County Schools, which is governed by an elected school board. A partnership with Sandhills Community College and the county created the SandHoke Early College program, which uses the community college as well as multiple middle and high schools in the county. Sections in Fort Bragg are served by schools in the Department of Defense Education Activity (DoDEA), for grades K-8. High school-level students living on Fort Bragg attend the local public high schools operated by the respective county they live in. According to the 2021 American Community Survey, an estimated 19.8 percent of county residents have attained a bachelor's degree or higher level of education.

== Healthcare ==
Hoke County is served by two hospitals, Hoke Hospital and the Hoke Campus of Moore Regional Hospital, both located in the eastern half of the county. County government supports a public health department, which experienced an expanding caseload between the 2010s and early 2020s due to Hoke's demographic growth.

== Culture ==
In 1984, the county began hosting an annual festival, the Hoke Heritage Hobnob. Over time, this transformed into the North Carolina Turkey Festival and then the North Carolina Fall Festival, which celebrates turkey production in the state. Several area buildings and sites have been listed on the National Register of Historic Places.

== Communities ==
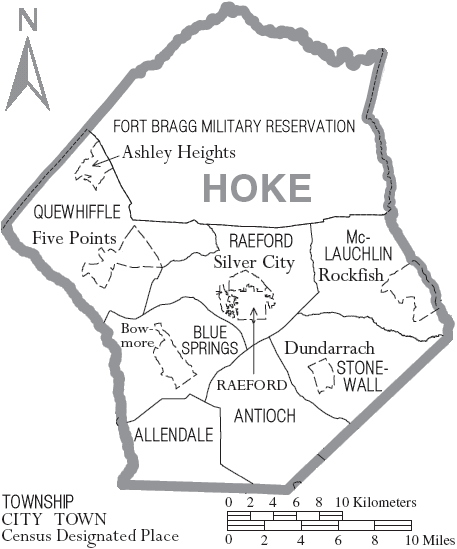
Map of Hoke County with municipal and township labels

=== City ===
- Raeford (county seat and largest community)

=== Census-designated places ===
- Ashley Heights
- Bowmore
- Dundarrach
- Five Points
- Rockfish
- Silver City

=== Townships ===
Hoke County townships include:

- Allendale
- Antioch
- Blue Springs
- McLauchlin
- Raeford
- Quewhiffle
- Stonewall

== See also ==
- List of counties in North Carolina
- North Carolina in the American Civil War

== Works cited ==
- Bonham, John (February 2010), Hoke County Working Lands Protection Plan (PDF), North Carolina Department of Environmental Quality
- Lowery, Malinda Maynor (2018). The Lumbee Indians: An American Struggle. Chapel Hill: UNC Press Books. ISBN 9781469646381.
- Monroe, Joyce C.; Raeford-Hoke Museum (2011). Hoke County. Arcadia Publishing. ISBN 978-0-7385-8679-3.
- Powell, William S. (1976). The North Carolina Gazetteer: A Dictionary of Tar Heel Places. Chapel Hill: The University of North Carolina Press. ISBN 9780807812471.
