= Rockfish, North Carolina =

- Census-designated place
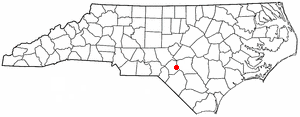
- Location of Rockfish, North Carolina
- Coordinates: 34°59′25″N 79°04′10″W
- Country: United States
- State: North Carolina
- County: Hoke

Area
  - Total: 5.07 sq mi (13.14 km^{2})
  - Land: 4.95 sq mi (12.83 km^{2})
  - Water: 0.12 sq mi (0.31 km^{2})
- Elevation: 220 ft (67 m)

Population (2020)
  - Total: 3,383
  - Density: 682.9/sq mi (263.68/km^{2})
- Time zone: UTC-5 (Eastern (EST))
  - Summer (DST): UTC-4 (EDT)
- FIPS code: 37-57200
- GNIS feature ID: 2403488

Rockfish is a census-designated place (CDP) in Hoke County, North Carolina, United States. As of the 2020 census, Rockfish had a population of 3,383.

== History ==
Puppy Creek Plantation was listed on the National Register of Historic Places in 1976.

== Geography ==
Rockfish is located in eastern Hoke County and is bordered to the east across Stewarts Creek by the city of Fayetteville in Cumberland County. Rockfish is 10 miles (16 km) east of Raeford, the Hoke county seat, and 13 miles (21 km) southwest of the center of Fayetteville.

According to the United States Census Bureau, the CDP has a total area of 5.1 square miles (13.1 km^{2}), of which 4.9 square miles (12.8 km^{2}) are land and 0.1 sq mi (0.2 km^{2}), or 1.87%, is covered by water. The community is drained by Stewart Creek and Gully Branch, both of which flow south to Rockfish Creek, an east-flowing tributary of the Cape Fear River.

== Demographics ==
Historical population
Census	Pop.	Note	%±
2020	3,383		—
U.S. Decennial Census

=== 2020 census ===
As of the 2020 census, Rockfish had a population of 3,383. The median age was 33.7 years. 27.5% of residents were under the age of 18 and 8.6% of residents were 65 years of age or older. For every 100 females there were 90.7 males, and for every 100 females age 18 and over there were 88.8 males age 18 and over.

65.8% of residents lived in urban areas, while 34.2% lived in rural areas.

There were 1,244 households in Rockfish, of which 42.6% had children under the age of 18 living in them. Of all households, 53.0% were married-couple households, 15.2% were households with a male householder and no spouse or partner present, and 25.2% were households with a female householder and no spouse or partner present. About 18.9% of all households were made up of individuals and 6.3% had someone living alone who was 65 years of age or older.

There were 1,306 housing units, of which 4.7% were vacant. The homeowner vacancy rate was 2.3% and the rental vacancy rate was 4.2%.

Rockfish racial composition
Race	Num.	Perc.
White (non-Hispanic)	1,816	53.68%
Black or African American (non-Hispanic)	712	21.05%
Native American	65	1.92%
Asian	65	1.92%
Pacific Islander	10	0.3%
Other/Mixed	259	7.66%
Hispanic or Latino	456	13.48%

=== 2000 census ===
As of the census of 2000, there were 2,353 people, 805 households, and 680 families residing in the CDP. The population density was 469.9 inhabitants per square mile (181.4/km^{2}). There were 893 housing units at an average density of 178.3 per square mile (68.8/km^{2}). The racial makeup of the CDP was 76.50% White, 14.32% African American, 2.76% Native American, 1.10% Asian, 0.30% Pacific Islander, 1.70% from other races, and 3.31% from two or more races. Hispanic or Latino of any race were 7.39% of the population.

There were 805 households, out of which 51.8% had children under the age of 18 living with them, 74.2% were married couples living together, 6.6% had a female householder with no husband present, and 15.5% were non-families. 11.4% of all households were made up of individuals, and 1.9% had someone living alone who was 65 years of age or older. The average household size was 2.92 and the average family size was 3.15.

In the CDP, the population was spread out, with 33.0% under the age of 18, 7.5% from 18 to 24, 45.8% from 25 to 44, 10.0% from 45 to 64, and 3.7% who were 65 years of age or older. The median age was 29 years. For every 100 females, there were 102.0 males. For every 100 females age 18 and over, there were 101.9 males.

The median income for a household in the CDP was $46,786, and the median income for a family was $54,375. Males had a median income of $35,574 versus $22,102 for females. The per capita income for the CDP was $18,112. About 6.6% of families and 7.1% of the population were below the poverty line, including 6.0% of those under age 18 and 8.7% of those age 65 or over.
