= Lumber Bridge, North Carolina =

Town in North Carolina, United States

- Town
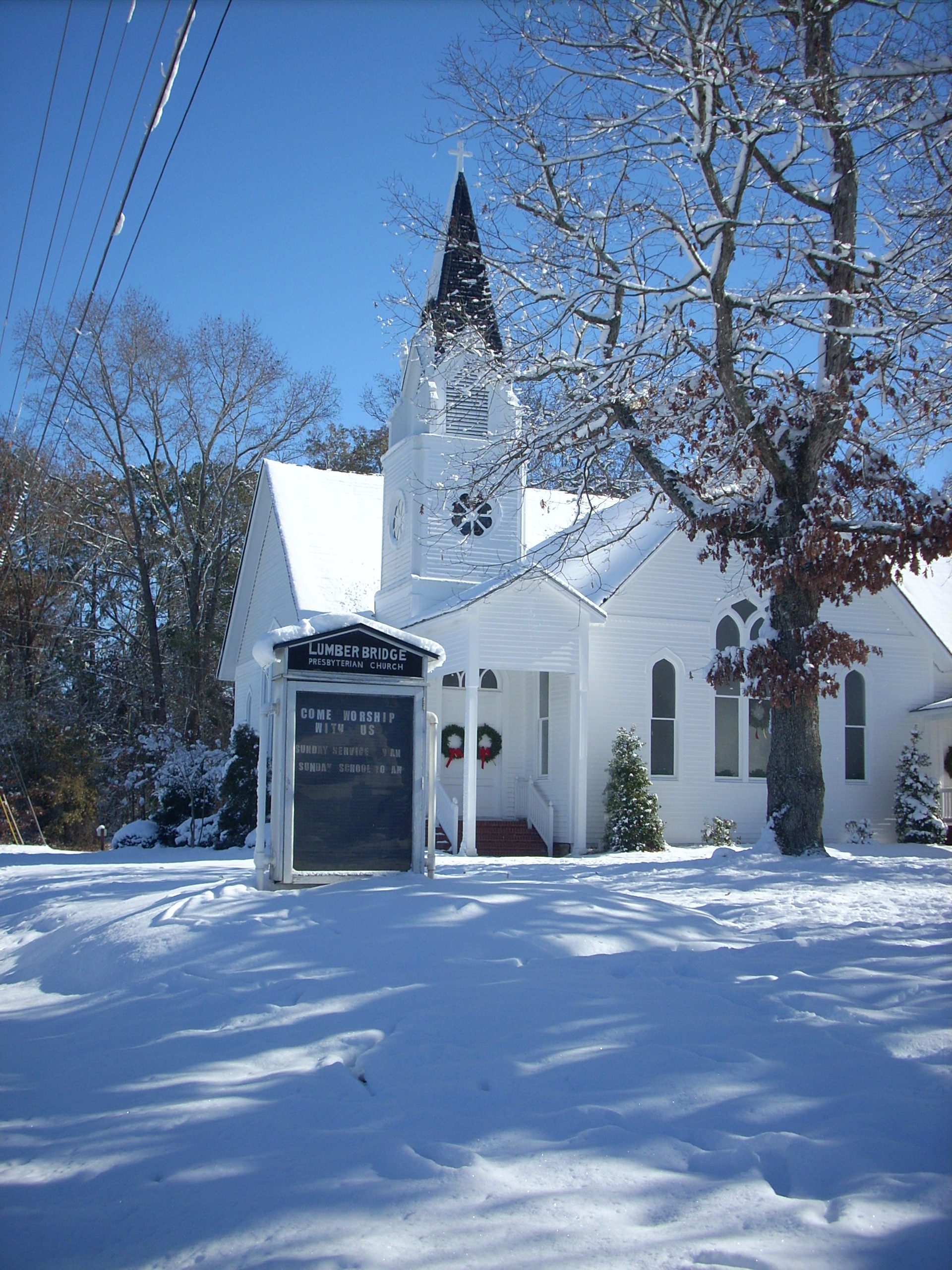
- A view of Lumber Bridge after a rare snowfall

- Location within the state of North Carolina
- Coordinates: 34°53′24″N 79°04′21″W
- Country: United States
- State: North Carolina
- County: Robeson

Area
  - Total: 0.68 sq mi (1.75 km^{2})
  - Land: 0.67 sq mi (1.74 km^{2})
  - Water: 0.0039 sq mi (0.01 km^{2})
- Elevation: 194 ft (59 m)

Population (2020)
  - Total: 82
  - Density: 122.4/sq mi (47.24/km^{2})
- Time zone: UTC-5 (Eastern (EST))
  - Summer (DST): UTC-4 (EDT)
- ZIP code: 28357
- Area codes: 910, 472
- FIPS code: 37-39680
- GNIS feature ID: 2406058

Lumber Bridge is a town in Robeson County, North Carolina, United States. The population was 82 at the 2020 census.

The town was incorporated by the North Carolina General Assembly in 1891. Believed to date from 1776, the original land grant was part of the holdings of Levey Glass. The town's name comes from the hand-hewn wooden bridge over the Little Marsh Swamp.

== Geography ==
According to the United States Census Bureau, the town has a total area of 0.7 square miles (1.7 km^{2}), of which 0.7 square mile (1.7 km^{2}) is land and 1.49% is water.

== Demographics ==
Historical population
Census	Pop.	Note	%±
1900	181		—
1910	165		−8.8%
1920	202		22.4%
1930	214		5.9%
1940	196		−8.4%
1950	154		−21.4%
1960	100		−35.1%
1970	117		17.0%
1980	171		46.2%
1990	109		−36.3%
2000	118		8.3%
2010	94		−20.3%
2020	82		−12.8%
U.S. Decennial Census

As of the 2010 United States census, there were 94 people living in the town. The racial makeup of the town was 75.5% White, 16.0% Black, 4.3% Native American, 1.1% Asian and 3.2% were Hispanic or Latino of any race.

As of the census of 2000, there were 118 people, 42 households, and 33 families living in the town. The population density was 179.6 inhabitants per square mile (69.3/km^{2}). There were 47 housing units at an average density of 71.5 per square mile (27.6/km^{2}). The racial makeup of the town was 82.20% White, 11.02% African American, 5.93% Native American, and 0.85% from two or more races. Hispanic or Latino of any race were 0.85% of the population.

There were 42 households, out of which 28.6% had children under the age of 18 living with them, 66.7% were married couples living together, 7.1% had a female householder with no husband present, and 21.4% were non-families. 19.0% of all households were made up of individuals, and 14.3% had someone living alone who was 65 years of age or older. The average household size was 2.64 and the average family size was 3.00.

In the town, the population was spread out, with 22.0% under the age of 18, 8.5% from 18 to 24, 23.7% from 25 to 44, 28.8% from 45 to 64, and 16.9% who were 65 years of age or older. The median age was 43 years. For every 100 females, there were 118.5 males. For every 100 females age 18 and over, there were 95.7 males.

The median income for a household in the town was $40,938, and the median income for a family was $41,875. Males had a median income of $25,313 versus $24,500 for females. The per capita income for the town was $12,513. There were 21.4% of families and 35.3% of the population living below the poverty line, including 50.0% of under eighteens and 14.3% of those over 64.
