= Parkton, North Carolina =

- Town
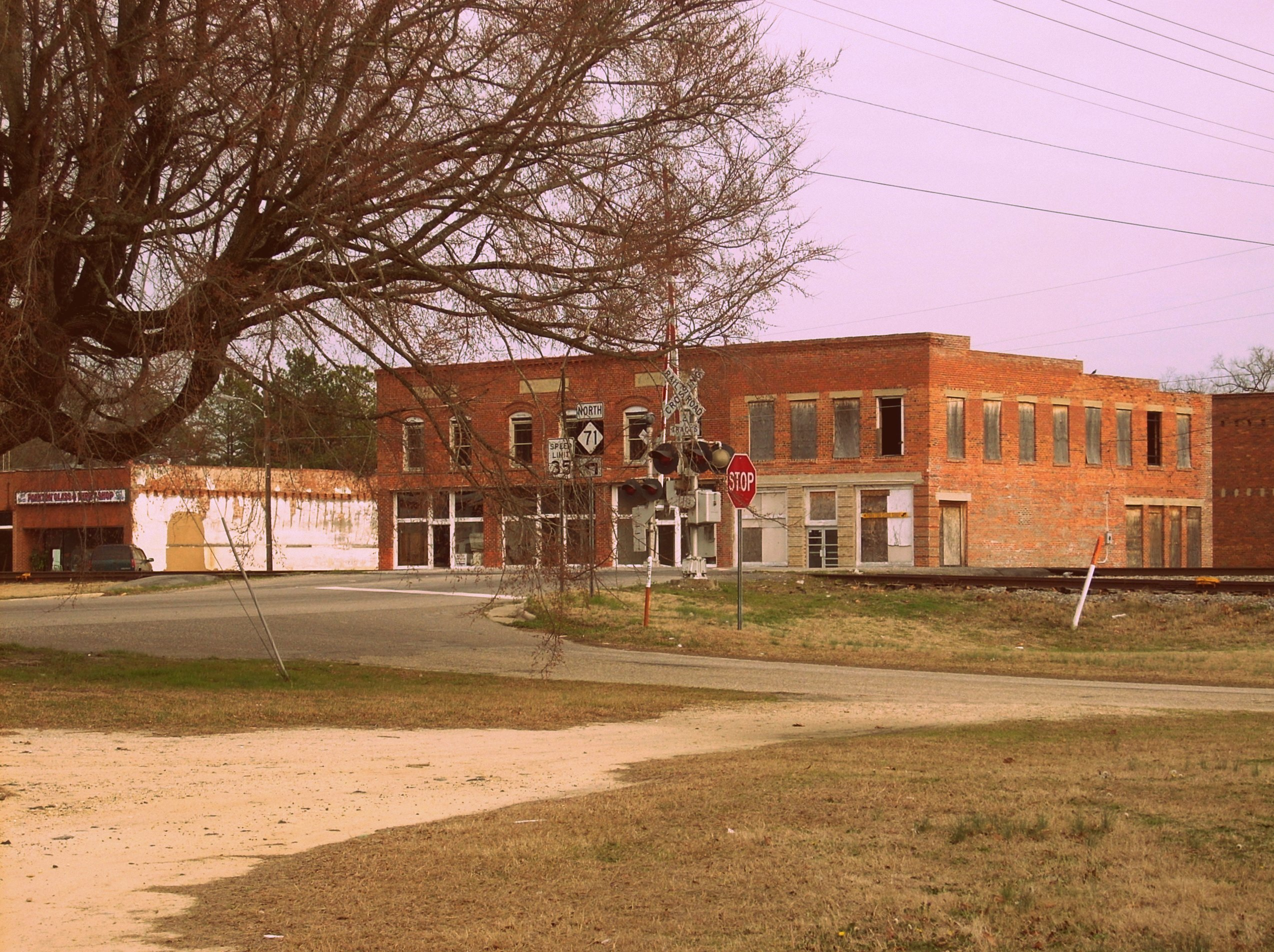
- Downtown Parkton

- Location within the state of North Carolina Parkton (the United States)
- Coordinates: 34°54′10″N 79°00′41″W
- Country: United States
- State: North Carolina
- County: Robeson

Government
  - Mayor: Edward Lowery
  - Police Chief: Hudson Chitwood
  - Fire Chief: Edward Nowak

Area
  - Total: 0.78 sq mi (2.02 km^{2})
  - Land: 0.78 sq mi (2.02 km^{2})
  - Water: 0 sq mi (0.00 km^{2})
- Elevation: 187 ft (57 m)

Population (2020)
  - Total: 504
  - Density: 646.2/sq mi (249.51/km^{2})
- Time zone: UTC-5 (Eastern (EST))
  - Summer (DST): UTC-4 (EDT)
- ZIP code: 28371
- Area codes: 910, 472
- FIPS code: 37-50340
- GNIS feature ID: 2407074
- Website: https://www.townofparkton.org/

Parkton is a town in Robeson County, North Carolina, United States. At the 2020 census, the population was 504.

== Geography ==
According to the United States Census Bureau, the town has a total area of 0.6 square miles (1.6 km^{2}), all land.

== Demographics ==
Historical population
Census	Pop.	Note	%±
1910	219		—
1920	382		74.4%
1930	436		14.1%
1940	441		1.1%
1950	527		19.5%
1960	906		71.9%
1970	550		−39.3%
1980	564		2.5%
1990	367		−34.9%
2000	428		16.6%
2010	436		1.9%
2020	504		15.6%
U.S. Decennial Census

As of the census of 2000, there were 428 people, 175 households, and 114 families residing in the town. The population density was 673.4 inhabitants per square mile (260.0/km^{2}). There were 193 housing units at an average density of 303.7 per square mile (117.3/km^{2}). The racial makeup of the town was 77.10% White, 14.72% African American, 3.27% Native American, 1.64% Asian, 1.40% from other races, and 1.87% from two or more races. Hispanic or Latino of any race were 5.37% of the population.

There were 175 households, out of which 26.9% had children under the age of 18 living with them, 49.7% were married couples living together, 10.9% had a female householder with no husband present, and 34.3% were non-families. 28.0% of all households were made up of individuals, and 12.6% had someone living alone who was 65 years of age or older. The average household size was 2.45 and the average family size was 3.01.

In the town, the population was spread out, with 24.3% under the age of 18, 6.3% from 18 to 24, 30.6% from 25 to 44, 22.7% from 45 to 64, and 16.1% who were 65 years of age or older. The median age was 38 years. For every 100 females, there were 88.5 males. For every 100 females age 18 and over, there were 86.2 males.

The median income for a household in the town was $32,321, and the median income for a family was $39,167. Males had a median income of $25,556 versus $20,938 for females. The per capita income for the town was $15,111. About 3.3% of families and 5.8% of the population were below the poverty line, including 5.6% of those under age 18 and 7.0% of those age 65 or over.

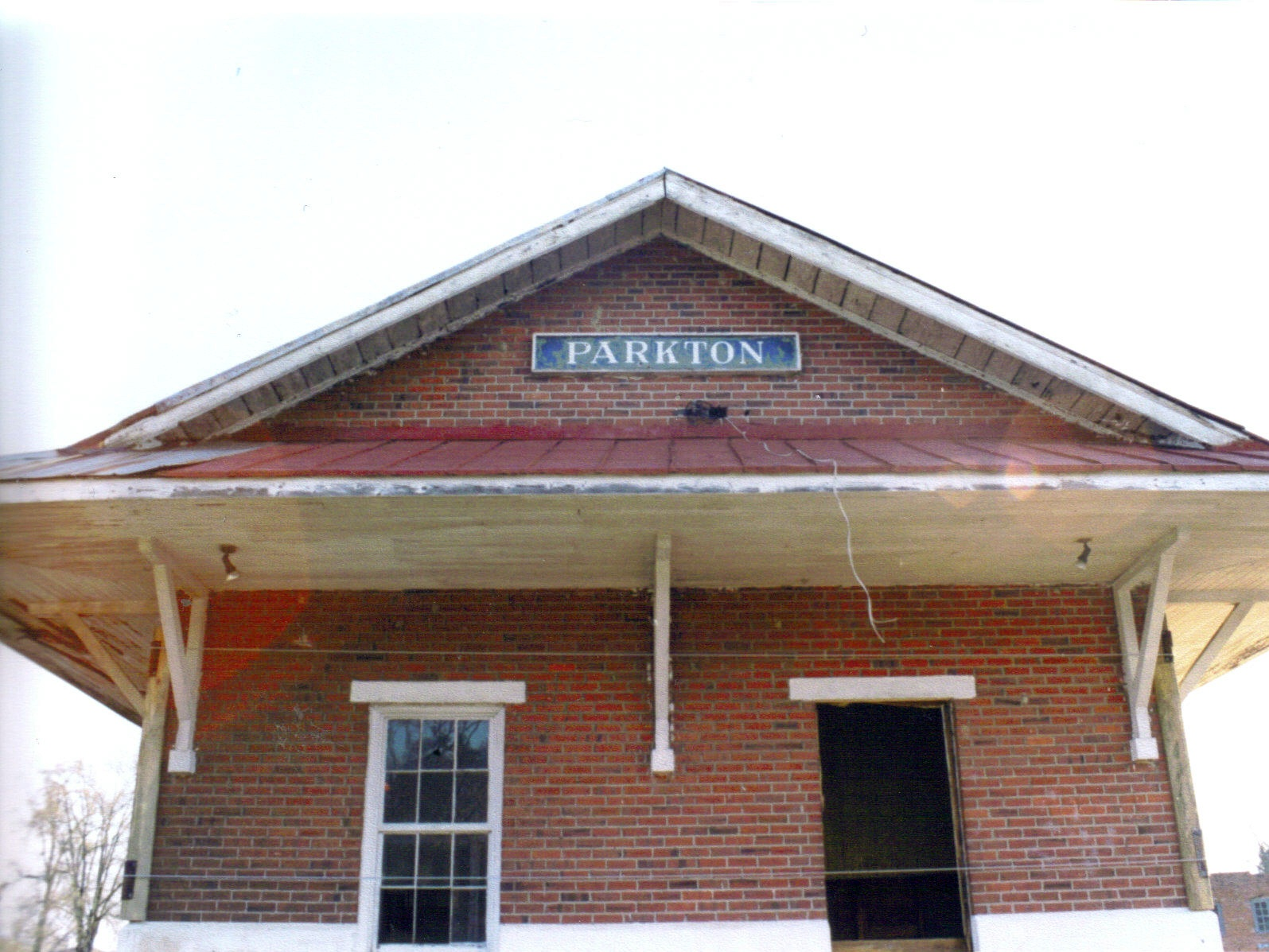
The old railroad station in Parkton.

== Education ==
Parkton Elementary School is a public educational institution that enrolls students PreK – 8th grade. Parkton Elementary is the only school in the town of Parkton, North Carolina. It is located on 400 North Green Street. Parkton Elementary was established in 1890 and is accredited by the Southern Association of Colleges and Schools. It is governed by Public Schools of Robeson County that serves 42 schools, elementary, middle and high school. Parkton Elementary offers an assortment of academic programs, such as accelerated reader, remedial, and character education. The school's motto is "Tomorrow's Leaders At Work Today!" The mascot is a Bruin (bear).
