= Raeford, North Carolina =

- City
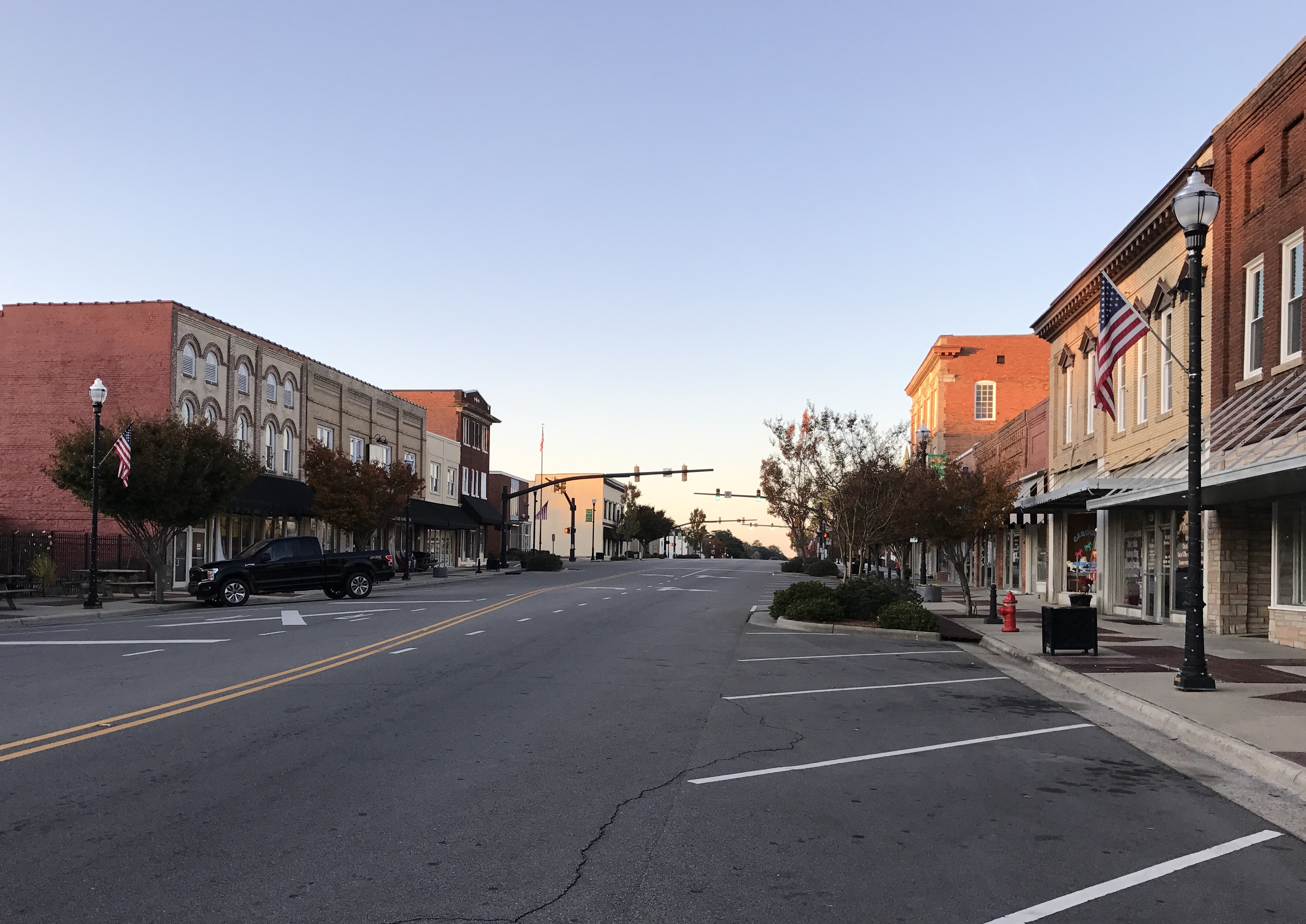
- Downtown Raeford, 2019

- Seal

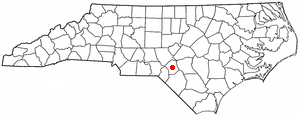
- Location of Raeford, North Carolina
- Coordinates: 34°58′51″N 79°13′45″W
- Country: United States
- State: North Carolina
- County: Hoke

Government
  - Type: City Council
  - Mayor: John Knox McNeill III

Area
  - Total: 4.31 sq mi (11.15 km^{2})
  - Land: 4.29 sq mi (11.10 km^{2})
  - Water: 0.023 sq mi (0.06 km^{2})
- Elevation: 256 ft (78 m)

Population (2020)
  - Total: 4,559
  - Density: 1,064.1/sq mi (410.87/km^{2})
- Time zone: UTC-5 (Eastern (EST))
  - Summer (DST): UTC-4 (EDT)
- ZIP codes: 28361, 28376
- Area codes: 910, 472
- FIPS code: 37-54580
- GNIS feature ID: 2404587
- Website: www.raefordcity.org

Raeford is a city in Hoke County, North Carolina, United States. Its population was 4,559 at the 2020 census. It is the county seat of Hoke County.

== History ==
John McRae and A.A. Williford operated a turpentine distillery and general store, respectively. Each took a syllable from his name and came up with the name Raeford for the post office they established. The McRae family, who lived at the "ford of the creek", was at one time made up primarily of old Highland Scot families. Likewise, the Upper Cape Fear Valley of North Carolina was, in the 18th and 19th centuries, the largest settlement of Gaelic-speaking Highland Scots in North America. Today, many of these old families continue to live in the area, though their presence is noticeably diminished by the great numbers of newcomers to the area as a result of Fort Bragg. Since World War II, many Lumbee Indian families have moved northward from Robeson County and now constitute a significant element of the population that is otherwise European and African American.

The Hoke County Courthouse and Raeford Historic District are listed on the National Register of Historic Places.

== Geography ==
Raeford is located in central Hoke County and is bordered to the northeast by Rockfish Creek, an east-flowing tributary of the Cape Fear River. The southern part of the city drains to Toneys Creek, a south-flowing component of the Lumber River–Pee Dee River–Waccamaw River watershed.

U.S. Route 401 runs through the north and west sides of Raeford, leading east 22 miles (35 km) to Fayetteville and southwest 20 miles (32 km) to Laurinburg. U.S. 401 Business passes through the center of town as Harris Avenue and East Central Avenue. North Carolina Highway 20 leaves the center of Raeford as St. Pauls Drive, leading southeast 19 miles (31 km) to St. Pauls. North Carolina Highway 211 runs through the center of Raeford, entering from the south on Main Street and leaving to the west on Prospect Avenue; NC-211 leads south 30 miles (48 km) to Lumberton and northwest 17 miles (27 km) to Aberdeen.

According to the United States Census Bureau, the city has a total area of 4.3 square miles (11.1 km^{2}), of which 0.02 square miles (0.06 km^{2}), or 0.53%, is covered by water.

=== Climate ===
Climate data for Raeford, North Carolina (1991–2020)
Month	Jan	Feb	Mar	Apr	May	Jun	Jul	Aug	Sep	Oct	Nov	Dec	Year
Mean daily maximum °F (°C)	52.9 (11.6)	56.6 (13.7)	64.6 (18.1)	73.5 (23.1)	79.9 (26.6)	86.4 (30.2)	89.5 (31.9)	87.9 (31.1)	82.7 (28.2)	73.1 (22.8)	63.8 (17.7)	56.1 (13.4)	72.3 (22.4)
Daily mean °F (°C)	41.3 (5.2)	43.7 (6.5)	51.3 (10.7)	60.0 (15.6)	68.0 (20.0)	75.8 (24.3)	79.3 (26.3)	77.8 (25.4)	72.0 (22.2)	61.0 (16.1)	50.6 (10.3)	44.4 (6.9)	60.4 (15.8)
Mean daily minimum °F (°C)	29.7 (−1.3)	30.8 (−0.7)	38.0 (3.3)	46.5 (8.1)	56.1 (13.4)	65.2 (18.4)	69.2 (20.7)	67.7 (19.8)	61.4 (16.3)	48.8 (9.3)	37.5 (3.1)	32.6 (0.3)	48.6 (9.2)
Average precipitation inches (mm)	3.71 (94)	3.66 (93)	3.92 (100)	3.18 (81)	3.80 (97)	4.72 (120)	4.86 (123)	5.05 (128)	5.27 (134)	3.29 (84)	3.55 (90)	3.55 (90)	48.56 (1,234)
Average snowfall inches (cm)	1.6 (4.1)	0.8 (2.0)	0.0 (0.0)	0.0 (0.0)	0.0 (0.0)	0.0 (0.0)	0.0 (0.0)	0.0 (0.0)	0.0 (0.0)	0.0 (0.0)	0.0 (0.0)	0.4 (1.0)	2.8 (7.1)
Source: NOAA

== Demographics ==
Historical population
Census	Pop.	Note	%±
1910	580		—
1920	1,235		112.9%
1930	1,303		5.5%
1940	1,628		24.9%
1950	2,030		24.7%
1960	3,058		50.6%
1970	3,180		4.0%
1980	3,630		14.2%
1990	3,469		−4.4%
2000	3,386		−2.4%
2010	4,611		36.2%
2020	4,559		−1.1%
U.S. Decennial Census

=== 2020 census ===
As of the 2020 census, Raeford had a population of 4,559, with 1,788 households and 1,086 families. The median age was 39.8 years. About 23.7% of residents were under the age of 18, and 20.4% were 65 years of age or older. For every 100 females, there were 85.2 males; for every 100 females age 18 and over, there were 81.0 males.

In 2020, 99.6% of residents lived in urban areas, while 0.4% lived in rural areas.

Of households in Raeford, 32.9% had children under the age of 18 living in them. Of all households, 37.5% were married-couple households, 16.3% were households with a male householder and no spouse or partner present, and 41.7% were households with a female householder and no spouse or partner present. About 32.3% of all households were made up of individuals, and 14.3% had someone living alone who was 65 years of age or older.

There were 1,946 housing units, of which 8.1% were vacant. The homeowner vacancy rate was 2.3%, and the rental vacancy rate was 4.9%.

Raeford racial composition
Race	Num.	Perc.
White (non-Hispanic)	1,707	37.44%
Black or African American (non-Hispanic)	1,793	39.33%
Native American	201	4.41%
Asian	40	0.88%
Pacific Islander	2	0.04%
Other/Mixed	225	4.94%
Hispanic or Latino	591	12.96%

=== 2000 census ===
As of the census of 2000, 3,386 people, 1,323 households, and 899 families resided in the city. The population density was 902.3 inhabitants per square mile (348.4/km^{2}). The 1,440 housing units averaged 383.7 per square mile (148.3/km^{2}). The racial makeup of the city was 52.75% White, 40.93% African American, 2.86% Native American, 0.95% Asian, 0.03% Pacific Islander, 1.09% from other races, and 1.39% from two or more races. Hispanics or Latinos of any race were 4.16% of the population.

Of the 1,323 households, 30.2% had children under the age of 18 living with them, 45.1% were married couples living together, 18.9% had a female householder with no husband present, and 32.0% were not families. About 29.6% of all households were made up of individuals, and 14.7% had someone living alone who was 65 years of age or older. The average household size was 2.40 and the average family size was 2.94.

In the city, the age distribution was 23.7% under 18, 7.3% from 18 to 24, 25.5% from 25 to 44, 23.7% from 45 to 64, and 19.7% who were 65 years of age or older. The median age was 41 years. For every 100 females, there were 84.9 males. For every 100 females age 18 and over, there were 77.9 males.

The median income for a household in the city was $31,306, and for a family was $33,772. Males had a median income of $27,060 versus $26,050 for females. The per capita income for the city was $16,093. About 18.6% of families and 22.0% of the population were below the poverty line, including 30.6% of those under age 18 and 13.6% of those age 65 or over.

== Education ==
Hoke County schools has 14 schools, including Hoke County High School.

== Notable people ==
- Diamond and Silk — conservative Internet personalities
- Eric Maynor — selected 20th overall by Utah Jazz in 2009 NBA draft
- Gil McGregor — selected 89th overall by Cincinnati Royals in 1971 NBA draft
- Terrell McIntyre — retired professional basketball player; two-time All-Euroleague First Team selection; reached Euroleague Final Four in 2008 with Montepaschi Siena
- Jim McMillian — selected 13th overall by Los Angeles Lakers in 1970 NBA draft
- Kathy McMillan — former Olympic long jumper representing the United States
- Detrez Newsome, former NFL running back
- Ted Thomas Sr. — cleric with the Church of God in Christ
- Earl Wolff — football safety for NFL's Washington Redskins; played college football at North Carolina State; selected by Philadelphia Eagles in the fifth round of the 2013 NFL draft
