= List of census-designated places in North Carolina =

This is a list of census-designated places in the U.S. state of North Carolina.

Census-designated places (CDPs) are unincorporated communities lacking elected municipal officers and boundaries with legal status. The term "census designated place" has been used as an official classification by the U.S. Census Bureau since 1980. Prior to that, select unincorporated communities were surveyed in the U.S. Census.

== Census-designated places in North Carolina ==
Map of the United States with North Carolina highlighted

CDP	County	Location of County	Population (2020)	Population (2010)	Population (2000)	Population (1990)	Notes
Advance	Davie		1,499	1,138	x		
Alexis	Gaston		589	x	x		
Altamahaw	Alamance		334				
Anderson Creek	Harnett		13,636	x	x		
Aquadale	Stanly		348				
Arrowhead Beach	Chowan		640	x	x		
Ashley Heights	Hoke		301				
Atlantic	Carteret		468				
Avery Creek	Buncombe		2,241			1,144	
Avon	Dare		832				
Balfour	Henderson		1,335			1,118	
Barker Heights	Henderson		1,249			1,137	
Barker Ten Mile	Robeson		937				
Barnardsville	Buncombe		559	x	x		
Bayshore	New Hanover		3,833			1,661	
Bayview	Beaufort		298				
Bell Arthur	Pitt		477				
Belvoir	Pitt		315				
Bennett	Chatham		284				
Bent Creek	Buncombe		1,402			1,487	
Bethlehem	Alexander		4,491			3,186	
Blue Clay Farms	New Hanover		168				
Bonnetsville	Sampson		318				
Bowdens	Duplin		196	x	x		
Bowmore	Hoke		76				
Brandywine Bay	Carteret		1,153				
Briar Chapel	Chatham		5,108				
Brices Creek	Craven		3,542				
Broad Creek	Carteret		1,968				
Brogden	Wayne		2,510			3,246	
Buies Creek	Harnett		3,253			2,085	
Bunnlevel	Harnett		516				
Butters	Bladen		250				
Buxton	Dare		1,181				
Camden	Camden		620				
Cape Colony	Chowan		691				
Caroleen	Rutherford		560				
Carolina Meadows	Chatham		727				
Cashiers	Jackson		657				
Castle Hayne	New Hanover		1,243		968	1,182	
Centerville	Franklin		149				
Cherokee	Jackson; Swain		2,195				
Cherry Branch	Craven		1,211				
Chinquapin	Duplin		86				
Chowan Beach	Chowan		385	x	x		
Cliffside	Rutherford		530				
Coinjock	Currituck		337				
Cordova	Richmond		1,653				
Cove Creek	Watauga		1,068				
Cricket	Wilkes		1,966			2,015	
Crouse	Lincoln		322	x	x		
Cullowhee	Jackson		7,682			4,029	
Cypress Landing	Beaufort		1,257	x	x		
Dana	Henderson		3,683				
Davis	Carteret		311				
Deep Run	Lenoir		572				
Deercroft	Scotland		414				
Delco	Columbus		287				
Delway	Sampson		150				
Denver	Lincoln		2,697				
Dudley	Wayne		826				
Dundarrach	Hoke		34				
East Flat Rock	Henderson		5,757				
East Rockingham	Richmond		3,471			4,158	
Edneyville	Henderson		2,395				
Efland	Orange		852				
Elrod	Robeson		391				
Elroy	Wayne		3,755			4,028	
Emma	Buncombe		2,174				
Engelhard	Hyde		374				
Enochville	Rowan		2,893			2,901	
Etowah	Henderson		7,642			1,997	
Evergreen	Columbus		336				
Fairfield	Hyde		231				
Fairfield Harbour	Craven		2,767				
Fairplains	Wilkes		2,029			2,339	
Fairview	Buncombe		2,771			1,830	
Farmington	Davie		291				
Fearrington Village	Chatham		2,557			1,101	
Five Points	Hoke		961				
Flat Rock	Surry		1,326			1,812	
Forest Oaks	Guilford		4,209			3,054	
Foscoe	Watauga		1,457				
Frisco	Dare		994				
Fruitland	Henderson		2,257				
Germanton	Forsyth; Stokes		790				
Gerton	Henderson		290				
Glen Raven	Alamance		3,239			2,616	
Glenville	Jackson		155				
Glenwood	McDowell		501	x	x		
Gloucester	Carteret		495				
Gold Hill	Rowan		372				
Gorman	Durham		1,104			1,090	
Governors Club	Chatham		1,969				
Governors Village	Chatham		1,512				
Graingers	Lenoir		229				
Grandy	Currituck		2,776				
Gulf	Chatham		122				
Half Moon	Onslow		7,543			6,306	
Hallsboro	Columbus		382				
Hampstead	Pender		7,016				
Harkers Island	Carteret		1,127			1,759	
Hatteras	Dare		577				
Hays	Wilkes		1,595			1,522	
Henrietta	Rutherford		395				
Hiddenite	Alexander		507				
Hightsville	New Hanover		710				
Hobucken	Pamlico		99				
Hollister	Halifax		618				
Hoopers Creek	Henderson		1,074				
Horse Shoe	Henderson		2,430				
Icard	Burke		2,452			2,553	
Ingold	Sampson		416				
Iron Station	Lincoln		825				
Ivanhoe	Sampson		198				
JAARS	Union		471				
Jackson Heights	Lenoir		1,071				
Jackson Springs	Moore		154				
James City	Craven		5,291			4,279	
Keener	Sampson		540				
Kelly	Bladen		446				
Kings Grant	New Hanover		8,466				
Lake Junaluska	Haywood		3,219			2,482	
Lake Norman of Catawba	Catawba		8,658				
Lake Norman of Iredell	Iredell		11,395				
Lake Royale	Franklin		3,392				
Laurel Hill	Scotland		1,121				
Light Oak	Cleveland		697			1,339	
Linville	Avery		283				
Long Creek	Pender		277				
Lowesville	Lincoln		3,281			1,092	
Lowgap	Surry		267				
Mamers	Harnett		814				
Manns Harbor	Dare		790				
Mar-Mac	Wayne		3,184			3,282	
Marble	Cherokee		278				
Marshallberg	Carteret		341				
Maury	Greene		1,404				
McLeansville	Guilford		1,113			1,154	
Millers Creek	Wilkes		1,931			1,787	
Millingport	Stanly		588				
Milwaukee	Northampton		157				
Moncure	Chatham		780				
Moravian Falls	Wilkes		1,712			1,736	
Mountain Home	Henderson		3,490			1,898	
Mountain View	Catawba		3,590			3,697	
Moyock	Currituck		5,154				
Mulberry	Wilkes		2,275			2,339	
Murraysville	New Hanover		16,582	14,215	7,279		
Myrtle Grove	New Hanover		11,476	8,875	7,125	4,275	
Nebo	McDowell		1,790	x	x		
Neuse Forest	Craven		2,110			1,110	
New Hope	Wayne		1,588	x	x	4,491	Not listed as a CDP in the 2000 or 2010 Census
Northchase	New Hanover		3,842				
Northlakes	Caldwell		1,543			1,219	
Ocracoke	Hyde		797				
Ogden	New Hanover		8,200			3,228	
Old Hundred	Scotland		218				
Pinetown	Beaufort		147				
Piney Green	Onslow		14,386	13,293	11,658	8,999	
Pinnacle	Stokes		786				
Plain View	Sampson		1,923				
Pleasant Hill	Wilkes		831			1,114	
Porters Neck	New Hanover		7,397				
Potters Hill	Duplin		437				
Prospect	Robeson		873				
Pumpkin Center	Onslow		1,855			2,857	
Raemon	Robeson		197				
Rex	Robeson		50				
Riegelwood	Columbus		545				
River Road	Beaufort		4,048			3,892	
Roberdel	Richmond		246				
Rockfish	Hoke		3,383				
Rocky Point	Pender		1,476				
Rodanthe	Dare		213				
Rougemont	Durham; Person		1,001				
Royal Pines	Buncombe		4,127			4,418	
Ruffin	Rockingham		322				
Salem	Burke		2,356			2,271	
Salvo	Dare		303				
Saxapahaw	Alamance		1,671			1,178	
Scotch Meadows	Scotland		568				
Sea Breeze	New Hanover		2,245				
Seven Lakes	Moore		4,900			2,049	
Shannon	Robeson		217				
Silver City	Hoke		643			1,343	
Silver Lake	New Hanover		6,500			4,071	
Skippers Corner	New Hanover		2,912				
Smithtown	Yadkin		224				
Sneads Ferry	Onslow		2,548			2,031	
South Henderson	Vance		988			1,374	
South Mills	Camden		362				
South Rosemary	Halifax		2,753			1,955	
South Weldon	Halifax		550			1,640	
Southmont	Davidson		1,563				
Spivey's Corner	Sampson		576				
Spout Springs	Harnett		11,040				
Springdale	Gaston		1,203				
St. Stephens	Catawba		8,852			8,734	
Stokes	Pitt		357				
Stony Point	Alexander; Iredell		1,146				
Sunbury	Gates		276				
Swan Quarter	Hyde		275				
Swannanoa	Buncombe		5,021				
Toast	Surry		1,423				
Tyro	Davidson		8,926				
Valle Crucis	Watauga		436				
Valley Hill	Henderson		2,207				
Vander	Cumberland		1,388				
Vann Crossroads	Sampson		306				
Wakulla	Robeson		112				
Wanchese	Dare		1,522				
Waves	Dare		172				
Welcome	Davidson		4,131				
West Canton	Haywood		1,265				
West Marion	McDowell		1,226				
Westport	Lincoln		5,705				
White Oak	Bladen		346				
White Plains	Surry		1,025				
Whittier	Jackson; Swain		25	x	x		
Woodlawn	Alamance		912				
Wrightsboro	New Hanover		5,526				
Yadkin College	Davidson		377	x	x		

== Former census-designated places ==
CDP	County	Location of County	Population (2020)	Population (2010)	Population (2000)	Population (1990)	Population (1980)	Notes
Altamahaw-Ossipee	Alamance		x	x	1,061	1,076		Split prior to the 2010 census into Altamahaw CDP and the town of Ossipee
Badin	Stanly		x	x	x	1,481		Incorporated prior to the 2000 census
Boger City	Lincoln		x	x	554	1,373		Annexed by Lincolnton; no longer listed as a CDP after the 2000 census
Bonnie Doone	Cumberland		x	x	x	3,893		Annexed by Fayetteville; not listed as a CDP in the 2000 census
Butner	Granville		x	x	7,591	4,679		Incorporated prior to the 2010 census
Camp Lejeune Central	Onslow		x	x	x	36,716		Annexed by Jacksonville prior to the 2000 census
Eastover	Cumberland		x	x	1,376	1,243		Incorporated prior to the 2010 census
Fort Bragg	Cumberland; Hoke		x	x	29,183	34,744		Annexed by Fayetteville; not listed as a CDP in the 2010 census
Hemby Bridge	Union		x	x	x	2,876		Incorporated prior to the 2000 census
Lewisville	Forsyth		x	x	x	3,206		Incorporated prior to the 2000 census
Masonboro	New Hanover		x	x	11,812	7,010		Annexed by Wilmington after the 2000 census
New Hope	Wake		x	x	x	5,694		Annexed by Raleigh prior to the 2000 census
New River Station	Onslow		x	x	x	9,732		Annexed by Jacksonville prior to the 2000 census
North Hickory	Catawba		x	x	x	4,299		Annexed by Hickory prior to the 2000 census
Parkwood	Durham		x	x	x	4,123		Annexed by Durham prior to the 2000 census
Pleasant Garden	Guilford		x	x	x	2,228		Incorporated prior to the 2000 census
Pope AFB	Cumberland		x	x	2,583	2,228		Annexed by Fayetteville prior to the 2010 census
Poplar Tent	Cabarrus		x	x	x	3,872		Annexed by Concord prior to the 2000 census
Seagate	New Hanover		x	x	4,590	5,444		Annexed by Wilmington after the 2000 census
Sedge Garden	Forsyth		x	x	x	2,784		Annexed by Winston-Salem prior to the 2000 census
Sherrills Ford	Catawba		x	x	941	3,185		Merged into the Lake Norman of Catawba CDP for the 2010 census
Smith Creek	New Hanover		x	x	x	7,461		Annexed by Wilmington prior to the 2000 census
South Gastonia	Gaston		x	x	5,433	5,487		Annexed by Gastonia; last appeared in the 2000 census

== See also ==
- North Carolina statistical areas
- List of counties in North Carolina
- List of municipalities in North Carolina
- List of unincorporated communities in North Carolina
