= Monument Quilt =

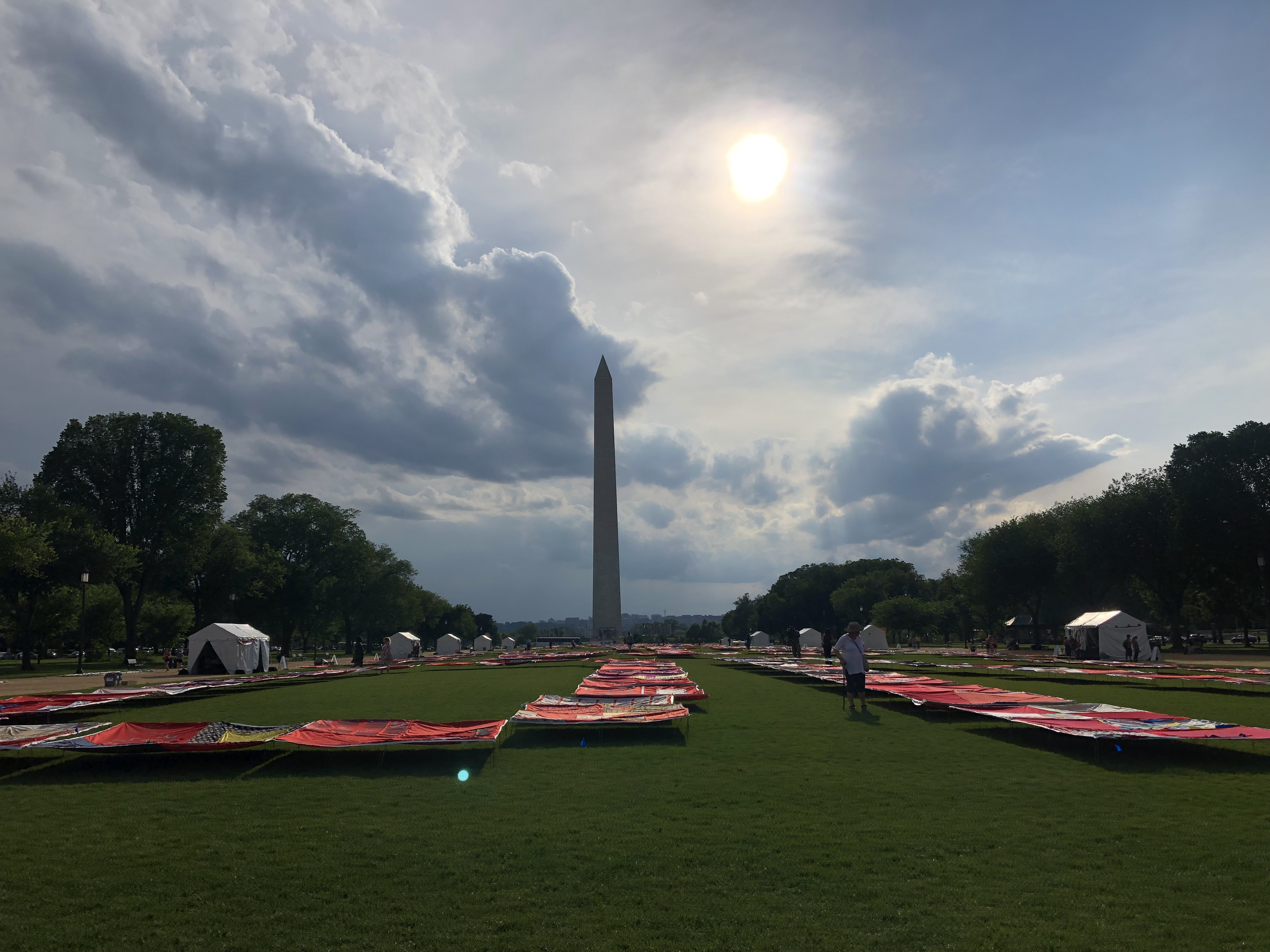
Monument Quilt display in Washington, DC, 2019

The Monument Quilt is an enormous quilt made as a memorial for survivors of rape. The quilt includes a collection of survivors' stories stitched, written, and painted onto red fabric.

== The quilt ==
The quilt includes over 3,000 stories by rape and abuse survivors and incorporates the stories of those who have experienced gender-based violence. The quilt was constructed over six years as organizers traveled to 49 states and 33 cities in the U.S. and Mexico, where parts of the quilt were displayed. Visitors were invited to share their stories on designated blank squares when the quilt was on display. The project culminated in a display of the entire quilt on National Mall in Washington, D.C., from May 31 to June 2, 2019. The quilt was constructed to read “Not Alone” and a Spanish translation, “No Estás Solx.”

The project's organizers paid special attention to the inclusion of stories from survivors in marginalized communities: women of color, trans and gender non-conforming folks, sex workers, First Nation communities, and child sexual abuse survivors. One of the project leaders, Liz Ensz, explained in an interview that the multiplicity of narratives was a driving force for the Monument Quilt: “It’s about presenting these other narratives that men can be survivors of rape and sexual assault, women can be perpetrators, any story can exist. There’s not just one narrative.”

== History ==
The idea for the quilt originated with Rebecca Nagle and Hannah Brancato, artists based in Baltimore, Maryland. Having seen research that showed how public monuments, such as memorials for war veterans, could help survivors recover from trauma, they set out to create a monument for the survivors of rape. They co-founded and co-direct the arts and activist organization FORCE: Upsetting Rape Culture. As a call to create a permanent monument, FORCE coordinated the installation of temporary monuments to rape and abuse survivors on the National Mall in Washington D.C. Their first "guerilla monument" in 2013 involved floating lines from a poem in the form of giant, red styrofoam letters on the Lincoln Memorial Reflecting Pool. The poem's lines read "I CAN'T FORGET WHAT HAPPENED BUT NO ONE ELSE REMEMBERS".

FORCE partnered with public safety organizations and community-based prevention groups who held quilt-making workshops and displayed portions of the quilt in public spaces. The quilt toured the United States in the summer of 2014. Starting at Arden, North Carolina, the quilt traveled to 13 cities.

In June 2015, the Monument Quilt was awarded part of the PNC Transformative Art Prize a $30,000 grant for display of the quilt in the autumn.

== Places where the quilt has been displayed ==
- Arden, North Carolina
- White River, South Dakota
- University of Wisconsin–Oshkosh
- Baton Rouge, Louisiana
- Des Moines, Iowa
- Quapaw, Oklahoma
- Birmingham, Alabama
- Queens Museum in New York
- Centennial Park in Nashville, Tennessee
- Towson University
- Johns Hopkins University

== See also ==
- AIDS Memorial Quilt
