= Laurel Hill, Scotland County, North Carolina =

Laurel Hill, North Carolina
- Unincorporated community
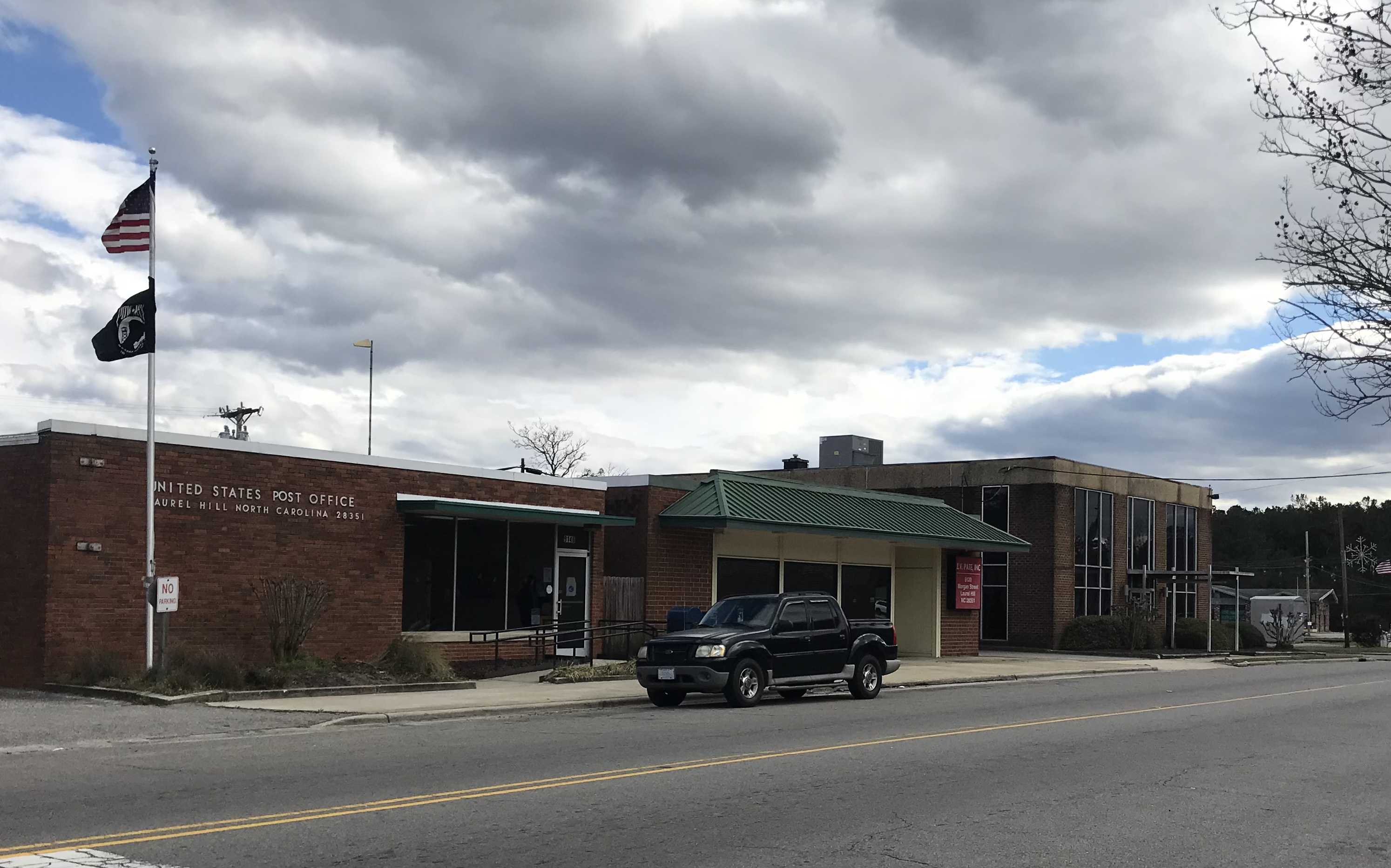
- North Carolina Highway 144 (Morgan Street)

- Location of Laurel Hill in North Carolina Laurel Hill, North Carolina (the United States)
- Coordinates: 34°48′33″N 79°32′52″W
- Country: United States
- State: North Carolina
- County: Scotland
- Elevation: 249 ft (76 m)
- Time zone: UTC-5 (Eastern (EST))
  - Summer (DST): UTC-4 (EDT)
- ZIP code: 28351
- Area codes: 910, 472
- FIPS code: 37-37165
- GNIS feature ID: 988195

Laurel Hill is a census-designated place and unincorporated community in Scotland County, North Carolina, United States. It is located northwest of Laurinburg, and southeast of Old Hundred, a neighboring community.

== History ==
In 1797 the Laurel Hill Presbyterian Church was established. The church was named for the laurel growing in the area. A community formed in the vicinity of the church, and after the American Revolutionary War it prospered as a center of commerce. Most of the initial settlers were Scottish Highlanders. A post office was established by 1822. A line of the Wilmington, Charlotte and Rutherford Railroad was later laid and a depot established to the south of the church area, and by 1861 most of the community had migrated there. A turpentine distillery and tub manufacturer were established. Federal troops under William Tecumseh Sherman camped by the church in 1865 during the Carolinas campaign of the American Civil War. In the 1870s John F. McNair created a general store in Laurel Hill. In 1900, Z.V. Pate purchased McNair's general store and transformed it into a large regional furniture retailer. Beginning in 2004, the community has hosted an annual festival, LaurelFest. In 2020 the local community center was demolished and the Scotland County Commission contracted construction of a new one the following year.

== Works cited ==
- Marks, Stuart A. (2021). Southern Hunting in Black and White: Nature, History, and Ritual in a Carolina Community. Princeton University Press. ISBN 9780691226866.
- Powell, William S. (1976). The North Carolina Gazetteer: A Dictionary of Tar Heel Places. Chapel Hill: The University of North Carolina Press. ISBN 9780807812471.
- Stewart, John Douglas; Stewart, Sara (2001). Scotland County. Arcadia Publishing. ISBN 9780738513584.
