= North Carolina Highway 144 =

State highway in Scotland County, North Carolina, US

North Carolina Highway 144
- Old Wire Road

Route information
- Maintained by NCDOT
- Length: 12.0 mi (19.3 km)
- Existed: 2002–present

Major junctions
- West end: Future I-74 / US 74 in Laurel Hill
- East end: US 401 in Wagram

Location
- Country: United States
- State: North Carolina
- Counties: Scotland

Highway system
- North Carolina Highway System; Interstate; US; State; Scenic
← NC 143	→ NC 145

North Carolina Highway 144 (NC 144) is a primary state highway in the U.S. state of North Carolina. It runs from Laurel Hill to Wagram, in the North Carolina Sandhills.

== Route description ==
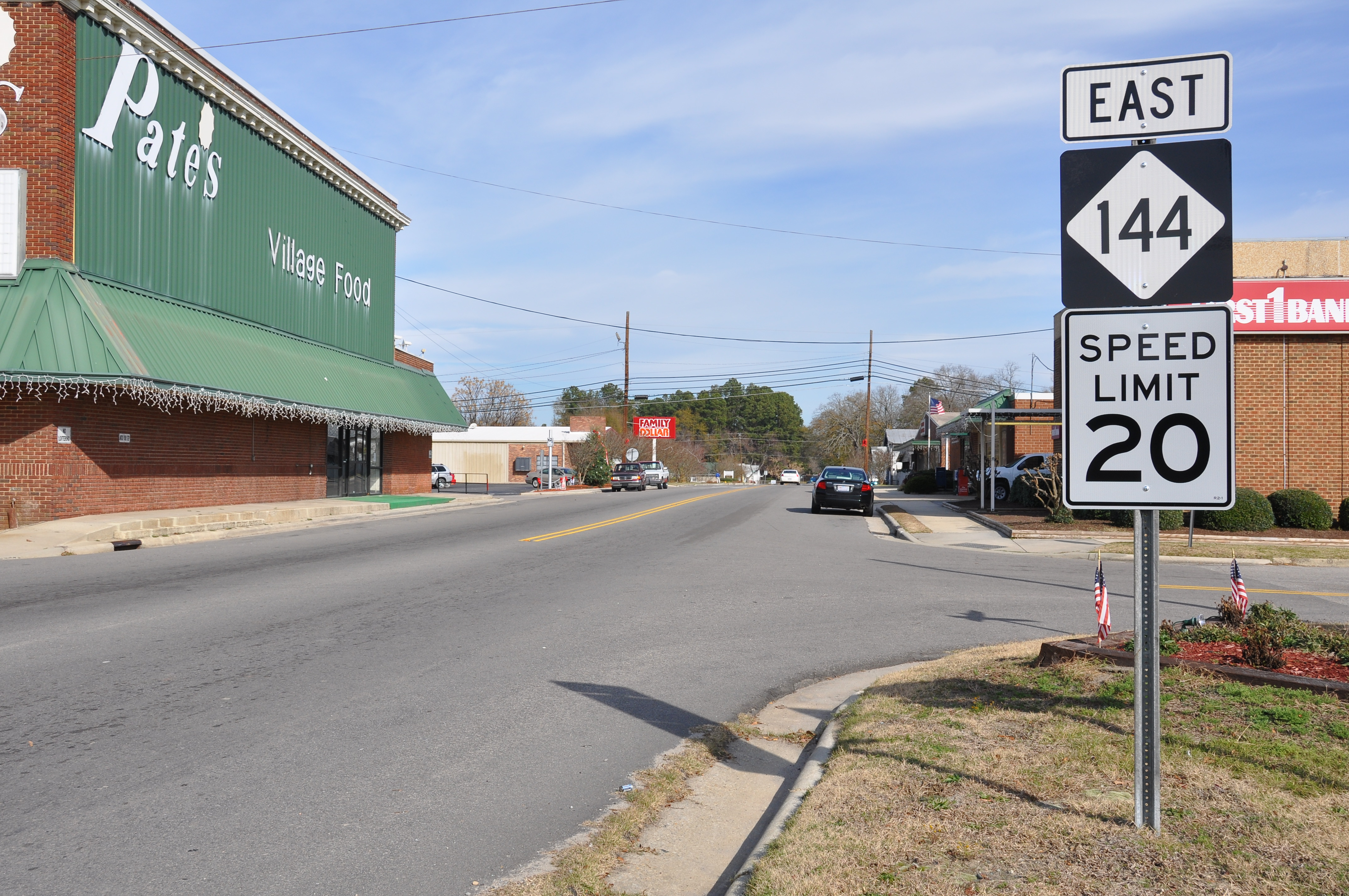
NC 144 in Laurel Hill

A two-lane rural highway, it traverses 12 miles (19 km) from Laurel Hill to Wagram. NC 144 provides an alternate route for U.S. Route 74 (US 74) traffic to reach US 401 while avoiding Laurinburg.

== History ==
Established in February 2002 as a new primary route connecting Laurel Hill and Wagram, unchanged since. This is the third incarnation of NC 144.

The first NC 144 was established in 1921 as an original state highway, running from NC 14 (now NC 86) in Prospect Hill to NC 13 in Roxboro. In 1925 it was extended west as new routing to NC 62. In 1932 NC 144 was extended northeast as new routing ending at NC 562 (now NC 96) in Virgilina. In 1936, was extended southwest as new routing to NC 61. In 1940 NC 144 was renumbered as NC 62 from NC 61 to Pleasant Grove and NC 49, from Pleasant Grove to Virgilina.

== Junction list ==
The entire route is in Scotland County.

Location	mi	km	Destinations	Notes
Laurel Hill	0.0	0.0	Future I-74 / US 74 – Rockingham, Laurinburg	
	5.8	9.3	US 15 / US 501 – Aberdeen, Laurinburg	
Wagram	12.0	19.3	US 401 – Raeford, Laurinburg	
1.000 mi = 1.609 km; 1.000 km = 0.621 mi
