= Carolina Crossroads =

Entertainment development project in North Carolina, USA

Coordinates: 36°24.3′N 77°37.9′W

Carolina Crossroads is a 1,000-acre (4.0 km^{2}) entertainment development project owned by Carida Capital Group LLC located in Roanoke Rapids, North Carolina located near the intersection of I-95 and US 158.

The development was planned in the early 2000s and a contract for the theater was signed in 2005. By the summer of 2008, only the indoor theater, amphitheater, RV park, and one hotel (a Hilton Garden Inn) had been completed. The theater, cornerstone of the entire development, was long mired in political, financial, and legal controversy. It is currently open, operating as the Weldon Mills Theater.

== Development plans ==
The development was hoped to bring new jobs to the area which had been affected in recent years as textile mills closed and jobs moved out of the area. Government officials hoped that Carolina Crossroads would lead the area from a manufacturing based economy to one based in tourism. Modeled loosely on the success of Branson, Missouri, the complex was intended to draw performers and tourists to the area. Planners noted location approximately halfway between New York and Florida and its proximity to I-95 and location between Raleigh, North Carolina, Richmond, Virginia, and the Hampton Roads, Virginia areas.

The complex features a 1,500+ seat live Venue indoor theater, a 90-acre outdoor amphitheater, a National Tractor Pullers Association NTPA course. With plans of expanding with a 1,000 Acre Entertainment Zone to add properties like an aquarium, water park, retail shops, Restaurants, Golf and Hotels.

A rock-and-roll-themed amusement park is also planned for the site. Carolina Crossroads bought the second oldest wooden rollercoaster, the Zippin Pippin, after its former home at Libertyland in Memphis, Tennessee had closed. Plans for the amusement park never materialized, and Carolina Crossroads later donated nearly all of the coaster back to Libertyland. Carolina Crossroads kept one car from the roller coaster and maintained that there are still plans to build a replica of the famous coaster.

== Initial plans ==
Roanoke Rapids Theater logo

The city of Roanoke Rapids borrowed $21.5 million to build the theater and signed a deal in 2005 worth $1.5 million per year with Randy Parton, brother of country music star Dolly Parton, to perform in and manage the theater. In addition to the $1.5M salary, the city of Roanoke Rapids was also to provide Parton with an "acceptable" home and car. When the theater opened on November 11, 2005, it was named the Randy Parton Theater. Soon after opening, the theater which is several hours from population centers in Raleigh, North Carolina and Norfolk, Virginia, struggled to attract customers. The break even point was reported to be 1500 paying customers per show but performances averaged only a few hundred.

As a part of the deal, Randy Parton was provided access to nearly $3 million with little oversight but reportedly was using the funds for personal travel and entertainment. In late December 2007 Roanoke Rapids Mayor Drewery N. Beale confronted Parton in his dressing room before a performance. An intoxicated Parton was driven home by police but not before giving a profanity-laced interview to a waiting TV crew. Parton was also questioned by city leaders for unauthorized events held at the theater including a wedding reception for his daughter along with details about who would be marketing the theater.

== Management and ownership changes ==
The local government in Roanoke Rapids, the North Carolina Local Government Commission, and North Carolina Treasurer Richard H. Moore (chair of the commission) at that time were questioned about their decision making surrounding the project. Questions remain on why they allowed the project to go forward and bonds be issued to finance the project based on assurances that any revenue shortfalls could be covered by sales taxes. Critics say that the commission failed to completely consider the study which relied on 2 hotels and a retail shopping facility be completed by the time the publicly funded theater was to open, which did not happen.

In November 2007 the city took control of the theater from Parton and gave it to UGL Unicco, hired to run the theater under a short-term contract. By early January 2008, more than 30 acts had been booked in the first half of 2008. During that time the theater produced its first profit of $17,000. Previously it had lost more than $1 million under Parton's management.

On January 8, 2008, the city of Roanoke Rapids terminated Randy Parton's contact and renamed the theater the Roanoke Rapids Theater. Scheduled performances continued, with disappointing ticket sales. Some details of contracts between the city, performers and other employees remained secret until local media obtained them via the Freedom of Information Act. Some who worked for the group responsible for bringing the theater to the area later worked for the theater and were paid hundreds of thousands in salary which some employees said was unearned. Several thousand dollars in "Memorandum of Understanding" payments to Parton's daughters have also been questioned. Scandal extended outside the project when a NCDOT official representing the area resigned after questions arose concerning fund raising efforts targeted at officials associated with the Carolina Crossroads project.

On February 18, 2008, UGL Unicco terminated its contract with the city of Roanoke Rapids citing repeated missed payments of over $100,000. Thereafter the city itself managed the theater until it closed in the summer of 2008. In December 2009, the city announced that it was selling the theater to Lafayette Gatling of Chicago, Illinois. It reopened and was renamed the Roanoke Rapids Theatre. However, in April 2010 the city announced it was terminating the contract with Gatling due to late payments. In June 2010, the city filed suit to evict Gatling from the theater; in August 2010, a court ordered Gatling to hand over the premises to the city. The city signed a new management contract and two events were held at the theatre in 2011.

Separately, the amphitheater operated briefly as the Atlantic One Amphitheater. The last event at the amphitheater under that branding was in July 2009. It was purchased by a new owner, Carolina Dirt, and rebranded as The Festival Park at Carolina Crossroads with an event scheduled for June 2011.

In November 2011, the city agreed to sell the theater outright to Gatling in an effort to reduce the city's debt from the project. However, this deal was not consummated. In September 2012, the city leased the theater to HSV Entertainment, an Arkansas company, which renamed it the Royal Palace Theatre. Events were announced for October 2012, and the city also announced that electronic gaming would be available at the theater.

In May 2015 the city terminated HSV's lease of the theater following a no-prosecution agreement between HSV and the United States Attorney for the Eastern District of North Carolina.

In 2016, the city announced an auction of the theater. The auction was unsuccessful, and the city retained ownership. Finally, on July 23, 2018, the City sold the theater. The theater remained open intermittently, but not the amphitheater.

In 2019 the North Carolina General Assembly considered legislation to bail out the city from its remaining debt obligations for the theater.

In 2023, the theater was purchased by Carida Capital Group, Bruce Tyler, Partner and owner of a local distillery, and reopened as the Weldon Mills Theater. It has bookings for 2024.

== Future development ==
In 2023, Roanoke Rapids changed its zoning laws to allow for the construction of a casino at Carolina Crossroads; however, a bill to legalize casino gambling in North Carolina died in the state legislature later that year. In 2024, the Roanoke Rapids City Council approved an amendment that would permit a multi-use indoor and outdoor recreation facility for horse racing on the property. In 2025, work began to re-open the amphitheater, which was abandoned and overgrown with brush. It hosted its first concert in August 2025.

== See also ==
- List of contemporary amphitheatres
