= Cape Fear Township, North Carolina =

Coordinates: 34.31°N 77.91°W

Cape Fear Township, North Carolina, is a statistical township consisting all of Blue Clay Farms, Castle Hayne, Hightsville, Northchase, Wrightsboro, and Skippers Corner. Cape Fear Township also includes part of Kings Grant and Kirkland, and Murraysville. Cape Fear Township is located in New Hanover County, North, Carolina.

== Demographics ==
Historical population
| Census | Pop. | Note | %± |
|---|---|---|---|
| 1970 | 6,734 | | — |
| 1980 | 10,184 | | 51.2% |
| 1990 | 12,570 | | 23.4% |
| 2000 | 15,711 | | 25.0% |
| 2010 | 18,388 | | 17.0% |
| 2020 | 19,892 | | 8.2% |
