= East Laurinburg, North Carolina =

- Unincorporated community
- Location in Scotland County and the state of North Carolina.
- Coordinates: 34°46′8″N 79°26′41″W
- Country: United States
- State: North Carolina
- County: Scotland
- Incorporated: 1909 (revoked)

Area
  - Total: 0.19 sq mi (0.50 km^{2})
  - Land: 0.19 sq mi (0.50 km^{2})
  - Water: 0 sq mi (0.00 km^{2})
- Elevation: 210 ft (64 m)

Population (2020)
  - Total: 234
  - Density: 1,218.2/sq mi (470.34/km^{2})
- Time zone: UTC-5 (Eastern (EST))
  - Summer (DST): UTC-4 (EDT)
- ZIP code: 28352
- Area codes: 910, 472
- FIPS code: 37-19620
- GNIS feature ID: 1020084

East Laurinburg is an unincorporated community in Scotland County, North Carolina, United States. The population was 345 at the 2020 census. The town was incorporated in 1903 but, due to financial improprieties and failing finances, the town's charter was revoked by the state effective June 30, 2022, in which the area became an unincorporated part of Scotland County.

== History ==
Scotland Village was incorporated as a town in southern Scotland County in 1903. In 1909, the name was changed to East Laurinburg. Early in East Laurinburg's history, Waverly Mills established a textile mill in the locale, which grew to include numerous homes and several churches and stores. The mill workers largely lived separately from the residents of nearby Laurinburg, the latter looking down upon the former and stalling attempts to enroll East Laurinburg children in Laurinburg city schools. In May 1934, 500 workers from four Waverly Mills plants in the town went on strike in protest of work conditions in the mills and living conditions in the company housing. The strike gained state-wide media attention after the strikers engaged in a brawl with loyalist workers, with nine people wounded by gunfire. The standoff ended 44 days later when the strikers and Waverly management agreed to arbitration, and the company subsequently promised to make improvements to plumbing in the village.

East Laurinburg's population peaked in 1940 with 890 residents and thereafter declined. In June 2016 the town ceased submitting annual audit reports to the state government, as required by law. In October 2021 the North Carolina State Auditor published an audit which accused the town finance officer of embezzling $11,000 of public funds. North Carolina State Treasurer Dale Folwell subsequently urged the North Carolina Local Government Commission to vote to revoke the town's incorporation, saying the town was not a financially viable unit of government. In December the commission voted to unanimously do so, reverting the town's governing jurisdiction to Scotland County on July 1, 2022.

== Geography ==
East Laurinburg is located at 34°46′8″N 79°26′41″W (34.768960, -79.444766).

According to the United States Census Bureau, the town has a total area of 0.2 square miles (0.52 km^{2}), all of it land. U.S. Route 74 and a rail line pass through the community.

== Demographics ==
Historical population
Census	Pop.	Note	%±
1910	577		—
1920	541		−6.2%
1930	813		50.3%
1940	890		9.5%
1950	745		−16.3%
1960	695		−6.7%
1970	487		−29.9%
1980	536		10.1%
1990	302		−43.7%
2000	295		−2.3%
2010	300		1.7%
2020	345		15.0%
U.S. Decennial Census

As of the census of 2000, there were 295 people, 124 households, and 81 families residing in the town. The population density was 1,619.8 people per square mile (625.4 people/km^{2}). There were 140 housing units at an average density of 768.7 per square mile (296.8/km^{2}). The racial makeup of the town was 83.05% White, 5.76% African American, 8.81% Native American, 1.36% Asian, and 1.02% from two or more races. Hispanic or Latino of any race were 1.36% of the population.

There were 124 households, out of which 20.2% had children under the age of 18 living with them, 40.3% were married couples living together, 18.5% had a female householder with no spouse present, and 33.9% were non-families. 31.5% of all households were made up of individuals, and 16.1% had someone living alone who was 65 years of age or older. The average household size was 2.38 and the average family size was 2.99.

In the town, the population was spread out, with 21.0% under the age of 18, 10.2% from 18 to 24, 23.7% from 25 to 44, 25.1% from 45 to 64, and 20.0% who were 65 years of age or older. The median age was 43 years. For every 100 females, there were 89.1 males. For every 100 females age 18 and over, there were 80.6 males.

The median income for a household in the town was $25,938, and the median income for a family was $31,875. Males had a median income of $21,944 versus $20,313 for females. The per capita income for the town was $13,415. About 24.1% of families and 22.9% of the population were below the poverty line, including 30.9% of those under the age of eighteen and 9.7% of those 65 or over.

== Works cited ==
- Covington, Howard E. Jr; Ellis, Marion A. (1999). Terry Sanford: Politics, Progress, and Outrageous Ambitions. Durham: Duke University Press. ISBN 9780822323563.
- Marks, Stuart A. (2021). Southern Hunting in Black and White: Nature, History, and Ritual in a Carolina Community. Princeton University Press. ISBN 9780691226866.
- Powell, William S. (1976). The North Carolina Gazetteer: A Dictionary of Tar Heel Places. Chapel Hill: The University of North Carolina Press. ISBN 9780807812471.
