= Blake House (Arden, North Carolina) =

Historic house in North Carolina, United States

- U.S. National Register of Historic Places
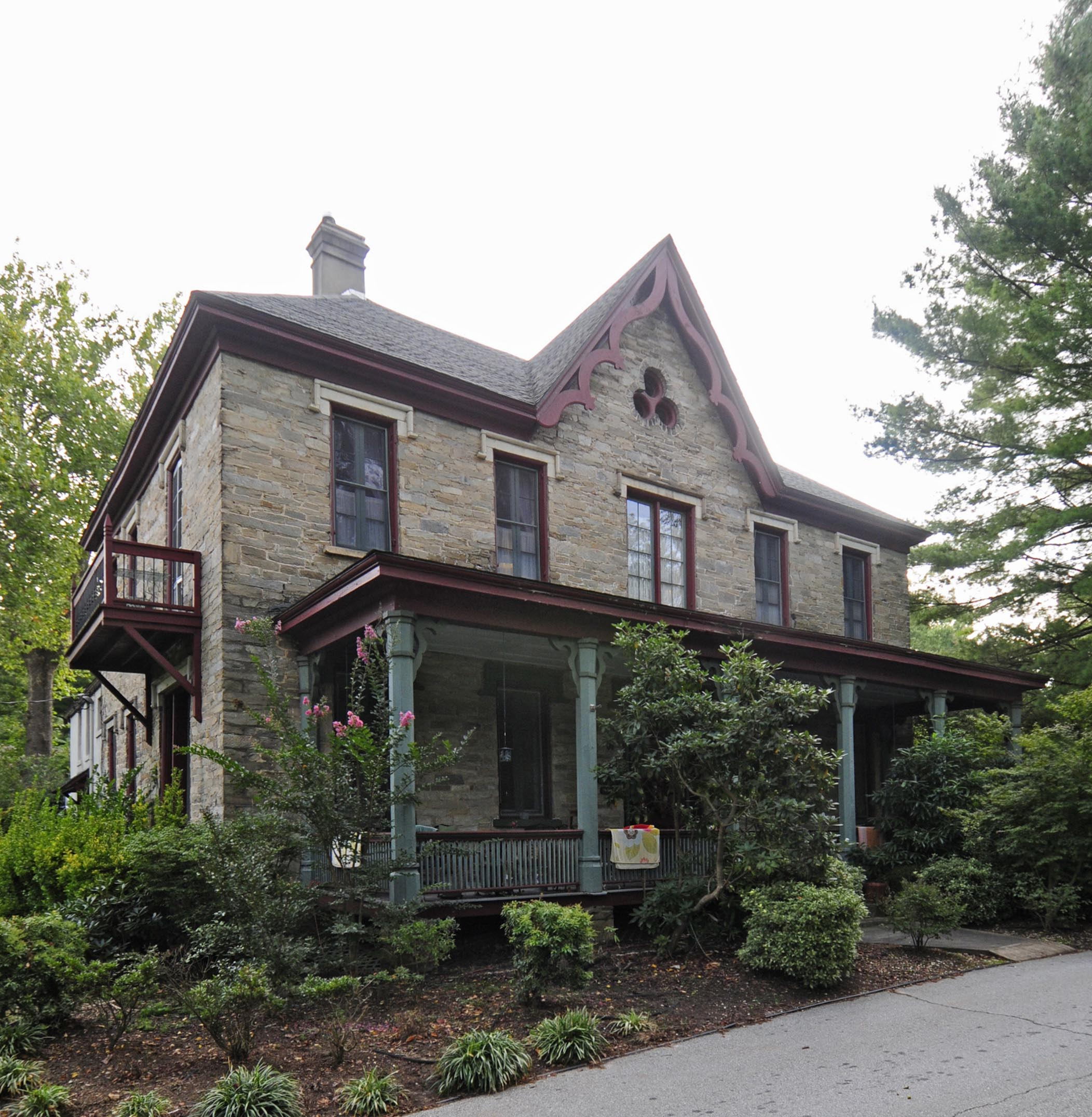
- Blake House, September 2012

- Location within North Carolina Location within the United States
- Location: 150 Royal Pines Dr., Arden, North Carolina
- Coordinates: 35°28′28″N 82°31′01″W
- Area: .55 acres (0.22 ha)
- Built: c. 1850
- Architectural style: Gothic Revival, Greek Revival
- NRHP reference No.: 10000600
- Added to NRHP: August 30, 2010

Blake House, also known as Newington, Royal Pines, and Joseph B. Pyatt House, is a historic home located at Arden, Buncombe County, North Carolina. It was built about 1850, and is a two-story, double pile stone house in the Gothic Revival style. The main block is five bays wide and has a hipped roof. The center hall plan interior features Greek Revival-influenced interior finishes. A rear ell was added in 1907.

It was listed on the National Register of Historic Places in 2010.
