= Arden, North Carolina =

- Blake House in Arden

- Location within North Carolina Location within the United States
- Coordinates: 35°27′58″N 82°30′59″W
- Country: United States
- State: North Carolina
- County: Buncombe
- Elevation: 2,218 ft (676 m)
- Time zone: UTC-5 (EST)
  - Summer (DST): UTC-4 (EDT)
- ZIP Code: 28704
- Area code: 828

Arden is an unincorporated community located in southern Buncombe County, North Carolina, United States. Arden is considered to be approximately the area between Skyland and Fletcher near the Henderson County line. Arden's ZIP code is 28704. Its post office serves Royal Pines and Avery Creek census designated places to the east and the area to the west of the post office. Arden is part of the Asheville Metropolitan Statistical Area.

The town was named for the Forest of Arden noted in the comedy, As You Like It, by Shakespeare. It was founded by author Charles Willing Beale in 1872.

Arden is home to Glen Arden Elementary school, located at 50 Pinehurst Circle as well as to Christ School, a private Episcopal school for boys. Arden is also home to Lutheridge, a Lutheran Camp and Conference Center affiliated with the ELCA.

== Historic structures ==
The Blake House was listed on the National Register of Historic Places in 2010. The structure is a rare example of the Gothic Revival Style in the state.

Arden is home to the Oak Park Historic District that was established in 1927. While building was interrupted due to the crash of 1929, more than 15 homes of the period remain standing today.
