= North Carolina Local Government Commission =

The North Carolina Local Government Commission is a part of the North Carolina Department of State Treasurer which was created after the Great Depression to assist local North Carolina governments in decision making involving large financing projects such as bond issues. The commission is chaired by the North Carolina State Treasurer.

== Structure and responsibilities ==
The Local Government Commission is a subagency within the North Carolina Department of State Treasurer. The body is made up of nine members: the state treasurer, who serves as its chair; the state auditor, the secretary of state, the secretary of revenue, three gubernatorial appointees, one State House appointee, and one State Senate appointee.

The commission is responsible for approving, selling, and delivering all North Carolina bonds and notes. It is empowered by statute to revoke the incorporation of financially-troubled municipalities.

== History ==
The commission was created by the North Carolina General Assembly in 1931. In 1933, legislation designated it a "separate and distinct division" of the Department of State Treasury. It was involved in the controversial Carolina Crossroads project near Roanoke Rapids, North Carolina and was criticized for lack of rigor in its evaluation of the proposal. In February 1997 the board assumed control over the finances of Princeville, the first time it had ever taken over the finances of a municipality. In December 2021, it voted to revoke the incorporation of East Laurinburg, effective June 2022, the first time it ever used this authority, after finding evidence of impropriety in the town's financial management.

== Works cited ==
- Parker, Adam C. (January 2013). "Still as Moonlight: Why Tax Increment Financing Stalled in North Carolina". North Carolina Law Review. 91 (2): 661–719.
