= Northchase, North Carolina =

- CDP
- Location within North Carolina Location within the United States
- Coordinates: 34°18′18″N 77°52′31″W
- Country: United States
- State: North Carolina
- County: New Hanover

Area
  - Total: 1.75 sq mi (4.54 km^{2})
  - Land: 1.72 sq mi (4.46 km^{2})
  - Water: 0.031 sq mi (0.08 km^{2})
- Elevation: 36 ft (11 m)

Population (2020)
  - Total: 3,842
  - Density: 2,233.3/sq mi (862.29/km^{2})
- Time zone: UTC-5 (Eastern (EST))
  - Summer (DST): UTC-4 (EDT)
- ZIP code: 28405
- Area codes: 910, 472
- GNIS feature ID: 2584327

Northchase is an unincorporated community and census-designated place (CDP) in New Hanover County, North Carolina, United States. Its population was 3,842 as of the 2020 census which is up from 3,747 in 2010. Northchase is located in the statistical township of Cape Fear.U.S. Route 117 passes through the community. Northchase was first listed as a CDP at the 2010 United States census.

== Geography ==
According to the U.S. Census Bureau, the community has an area of 1.757 square miles (4.55 km^{2}); 1.728 square miles (4.48 km^{2}) of its area is land, and 0.029 square miles (0.075 km^{2}) is water.

== Demographics ==
Historical population
| Census | Pop. | Note | %± |
|---|---|---|---|
| 2010 | 3,747 | | — |
| 2020 | 3,842 | | 2.5% |
U.S. Decennial Census

=== 2020 census ===
As of the 2020 census, Northchase had a population of 3,842. The median age was 38.1 years. 21.1% of residents were under the age of 18 and 17.4% of residents were 65 years of age or older. For every 100 females there were 89.0 males, and for every 100 females age 18 and over there were 84.8 males age 18 and over.

100.0% of residents lived in urban areas, while 0.0% lived in rural areas.

There were 1,613 households in Northchase, of which 29.9% had children under the age of 18 living in them. Of all households, 40.4% were married-couple households, 19.1% were households with a male householder and no spouse or partner present, and 32.6% were households with a female householder and no spouse or partner present. About 31.8% of all households were made up of individuals and 12.0% had someone living alone who was 65 years of age or older.

There were 1,696 housing units, of which 4.9% were vacant. The homeowner vacancy rate was 1.5% and the rental vacancy rate was 6.9%.

Racial composition as of the 2020 census
| Race | Number | Percent |
|---|---|---|
| White | 2,803 | 73.0% |
| Black or African American | 520 | 13.5% |
| American Indian and Alaska Native | 27 | 0.7% |
| Asian | 44 | 1.1% |
| Native Hawaiian and Other Pacific Islander | 2 | 0.1% |
| Some other race | 134 | 3.5% |
| Two or more races | 312 | 8.1% |
| Hispanic or Latino (of any race) | 286 | 7.4% |
