= Seagate, North Carolina =

- Former census-designated place
- City of Wilmington
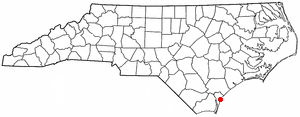
- Location of Seagate, North Carolina
- Coordinates: 34°12′13″N 77°50′38″W
- Country: United States
- State: North Carolina
- County: New Hanover
- City: Wilmington
- Established: c. 1900

Area
  - Total: 4.1 sq mi (10.7 km^{2})
  - Land: 3.6 sq mi (9.2 km^{2})
  - Water: 0.58 sq mi (1.5 km^{2})
- Elevation: 23 ft (7 m)
- Time zone: UTC-5 (Eastern (EST))
  - Summer (DST): UTC-4 (EDT)

Seagate was a census-designated place (CDP) in New Hanover County, North Carolina, United States. The last census count in 2000 was 4,590. It was annexed by the city of Wilmington in 1998.

== Geography ==
Seagate was located at 34°12′13″N 77°50′38″W (34.203648, -77.843996).

According to the United States Census Bureau, the CDP had a total area of 4.1 square miles (11 km^{2}), of which 3.5 square miles (9.1 km^{2}) is land and 0.6 square miles (1.6 km^{2}) (13.84%) is water.

== Demographics ==
Historical population
Census	Pop.	Note	%±
2000	4,590		—

At the 2000 Census, there were 4,590 people, 1,851 households, and 1,269 families residing in the CDP. The population density was 1,293.1 inhabitants per square mile (499.3/km^{2}). There were 2,041 housing units at an average density of 575.0 per square mile (222.0/km^{2}). The racial makeup of the CDP was 92.09% White, 4.44% African American, 0.26% Native American, 0.68% Asian, 0.04% Pacific Islander, 1.26% from other races, and 1.22% from two or more races. Hispanic or Latino of any race were 2.29% of the population.

There were 1,851 households, out of which 31.3% had children under the age of 18 living with them, 56.5% were married couples living together, 9.3% had a female householder with no husband present, and 31.4% were non-families. 22.1% of all households were made up of individuals, and 7.0% had someone living alone who was 65 years of age or older. The average household size was 2.48 and the average family size was 2.91.

In the CDP, the population was spread out, with 23.7% under the age of 18, 8.7% from 18 to 24, 29.9% from 25 to 44, 26.8% from 45 to 64, and 11.0% who were 65 years of age or older. The median age was 38 years. For every 100 females, there were 101.1 males. For every 100 females age 18 and over, there were 99.7 males.

The median income for a household in the CDP was $50,548, and the median income for a family was $62,724. Males had a median income of $40,443 versus $23,750 for females. The per capita income for the CDP was $29,567. About 8.7% of families and 11.7% of the population were below the poverty line, including 16.6% of those under age 18 and 11.7% of those age 65 or over.
