= Hightsville, North Carolina =

- CDP
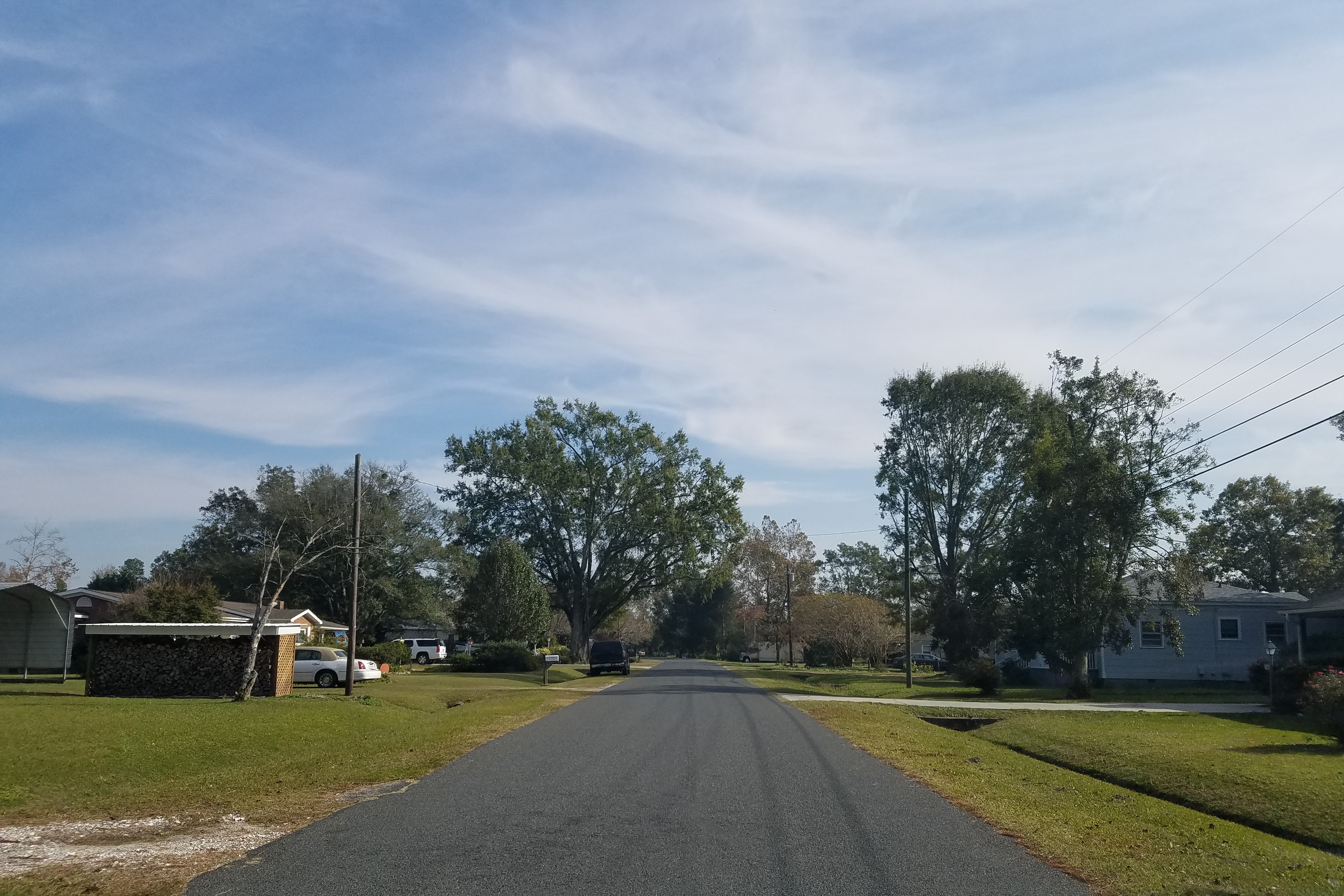

- Location in New Hanover County and the state of North Carolina.
- Coordinates: 34°16′00″N 77°56′04″W
- Country: United States
- State: North Carolina
- County: New Hanover

Area
  - Total: 1.61 sq mi (4.18 km^{2})
  - Land: 1.46 sq mi (3.78 km^{2})
  - Water: 0.15 sq mi (0.40 km^{2})
- Elevation: 3 ft (0.91 m)

Population (2020)
  - Total: 710
  - Density: 486.9/sq mi (188.01/km^{2})
- Time zone: UTC-5 (Eastern (EST))
  - Summer (DST): UTC-4 (EDT)
- ZIP code: 28401
- Area codes: 910, 472
- FIPS code: 37-31490
- GNIS feature ID: 2402585

Hightsville is a census-designated place (CDP) in New Hanover County, North Carolina, United States. The population was 710 at the 2020 census which is down from 739 in 2010. Hightsville is located in the statistical township of Cape Fear. The CDP is part of the Wilmington Metropolitan Statistical Area. Hightsville was first listed as a CDP at the 2000 United States census.

== Geography ==
According to the United States Census Bureau, the CDP has a total area of 1.6 square miles (4.1 km^{2}), all land.

== Demographics ==
Historical population
Census	Pop.	Note	%±
2000	759		—
2010	739		−2.6%
2020	710		−3.9%
U.S. Decennial Census

As of the census of 2000, there were 759 people, 163 households, and 102 families residing in the CDP. The population density was 484.6 people per square mile (187.1 people/km^{2}). There were 186 housing units at an average density of 118.8 per square mile (45.9/km^{2}). The racial makeup of the CDP was 64.16% White, 33.86% African American, 0.66% Native American, 0.92% from other races, and 0.40% from two or more races. Hispanic or Latino of any race were 1.45% of the population.

There were 163 households, out of which 27.0% had children under the age of 18 living with them, 45.4% were married couples living together, 12.9% had a female householder with no husband present, and 37.4% were non-families. 31.3% of all households were made up of individuals, and 12.9% had someone living alone who was 65 years of age or older. The average household size was 2.34 and the average family size was 2.94.

In the CDP, the population was spread out, with 11.3% under the age of 18, 10.4% from 18 to 24, 50.6% from 25 to 44, 18.3% from 45 to 64, and 9.4% who were 65 years of age or older. The median age was 36 years. For every 100 females, there were 287.2 males. For every 100 females age 18 and over, there were 339.9 males.

The median income for a household in the CDP was $33,088, and the median income for a family was $42,188. Males had a median income of $27,292 versus $25,972 for females. The per capita income for the CDP was $13,458. None of the families and 3.4% of the population were living below the poverty line, including no under eighteens and 8.5% of those over 64.
