= Deercroft, North Carolina =

- Unincorporated community
- Location within North Carolina Location within the United States
- Coordinates: 34°57′33″N 79°26′07″W
- Country: United States
- State: North Carolina
- County: Scotland

Area
  - Total: 1.35 sq mi (3.50 km^{2})
  - Land: 1.29 sq mi (3.34 km^{2})
  - Water: 0.062 sq mi (0.16 km^{2})
- Elevation: 348 ft (106 m)

Population (2020)
  - Total: 414
  - Density: 320.6/sq mi (123.77/km^{2})
- Time zone: UTC-5 (Eastern (EST))
  - Summer (DST): UTC-4 (EDT)
- ZIP code: 28396
- Area codes: 910, 472
- GNIS feature ID: 2629367

Deercroft is an unincorporated community and census-designated place in Scotland County, North Carolina, United States. As of the 2020 census, Deercroft had a population of 414. U.S. Routes 15 and 501 pass through the community.

== Geography ==
According to the U.S. Census Bureau, the community has an area of 1.353 square miles (3.50 km^{2}); 1.291 square miles (3.34 km^{2}) of its area is land, and 0.062 square miles (0.16 km^{2}) is water.

== Demographics ==
Historical population
Census	Pop.	Note	%±
2020	414		—
U.S. Decennial Census
