= Scotland County, North Carolina =

County in North Carolina, United States

- County
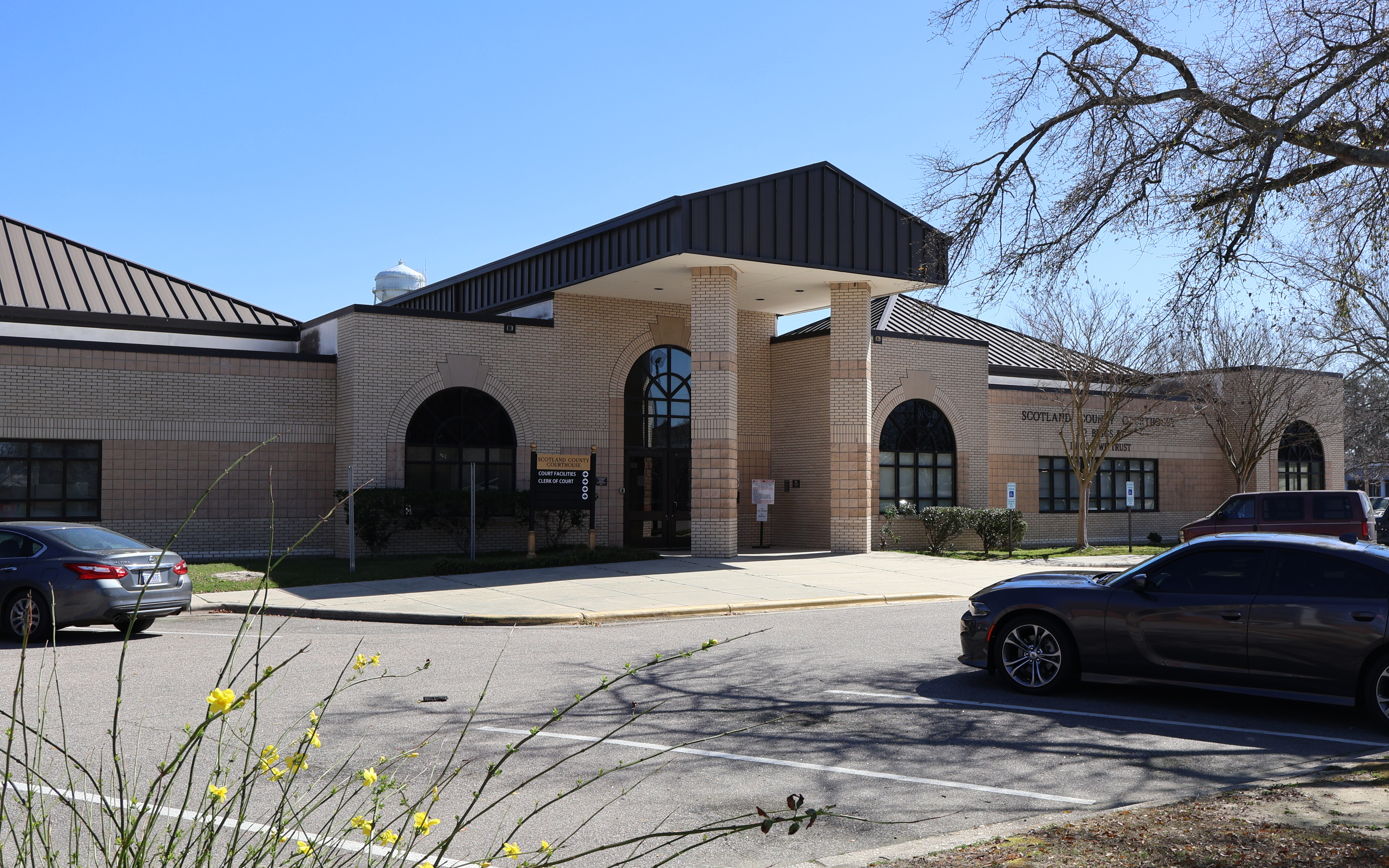
- Scotland County Courthouse

- Flag Seal Logo
- Motto: "Future Focused"
- Location within the U.S. state of North Carolina
- Coordinates: 34.84°N 79.48°W
- Country: United States
- State: North Carolina
- Founded: February 20, 1899
- Named for: Scotland
- Seat: Laurinburg
- Largest community: Laurinburg

Area
  - Total: 320.62 sq mi (830.4 km^{2})
  - Land: 319.14 sq mi (826.6 km^{2})
  - Water: 1.48 sq mi (3.8 km^{2}) 0.46%

Population (2020)
  - Total: 34,174
  - Estimate (2025): 33,322 ▼
  - Density: 107.08/sq mi (41.34/km^{2})
- Time zone: UTC−5 (Eastern)
  - Summer (DST): UTC−4 (EDT)
- Congressional district: 8th
- Website: www.scotlandcounty.org

Scotland County is a county located in the south central part of the U.S. state of North Carolina. Its county seat is and largest community is Laurinburg. The county was formed in 1899 from part of Richmond County and named in honor of the Scottish settlers who occupied the area in the 1700s. As of the 2020 census, its population was 34,174.

The area comprising Scotland County was originally inhabited by Native Americans and was settled by Europeans as early as the 1720s, though settling heavily increased after the American Revolutionary War. Scotland County was created out of Richmond County in 1899 largely for political reasons. The area began to industrialize at the turn of the 20th century, but suffered heavily during the Great Depression. Industrialization increased again after World War II, as agriculture mechanized. In the 2000s, the county's economy suffered a major downturn due to the departure of textile manufacturers and the Great Recession. The economy continues to struggle in the area and the county regularly suffers from one of the state's highest unemployment rates.

== History ==
=== Early history ===
The earliest residents of the land which became Scotland County were Cheraw Native Americans. Many Scottish Highlanders and English Quakers began colonizing the area as early as the 1720s when it was within the British Province of North Carolina. The land encompassing Scotland County was originally under the jurisdiction of Bladen County. As North Carolina grew, its original counties were subdivided and the future Scotland portion was placed in the new Anson County. The relevant portion was then moved into the new Richmond County in 1779. Richmond County was bisected by the Sandhills, leaving the eastern portion—of future Scotland—geographically separated from the rest of the county.

More immigrants came after the American Revolutionary War, especially one large group of Highland Scots which came from the Cape Fear River. The group split and settled two areas in the county, Johns and Laurel Hill, the latter in the vicinity of the Laurel Hill Presbyterian Church, established in 1797. Laurel Hill became the first major community in the region, prospering as a post-revolution trading center. More immigrants settled the area at this time, including Germans, Welsh, English, and Ulster Scots. Enslaved Africans were also brought into the area. The Laurel Hill community largely moved south in 1861 after the Wilmington, Charlotte and Rutherford Railroad laid a line through the area. Gaelic was spoken in the area through the 1860s.

During the American Civil War, the railroad's shops were moved to Laurinburg in the hope they would be safer from Union Army attack; however, in March 1865, Union forces reached Laurinburg and burned the railroad depot and temporary shops. The shops were rebuilt after the war, though economic recovery was slow. Laurinburg was incorporated in 1877. It continued to develop as a railway town until 1894 when the shops were moved.

=== Creation ===
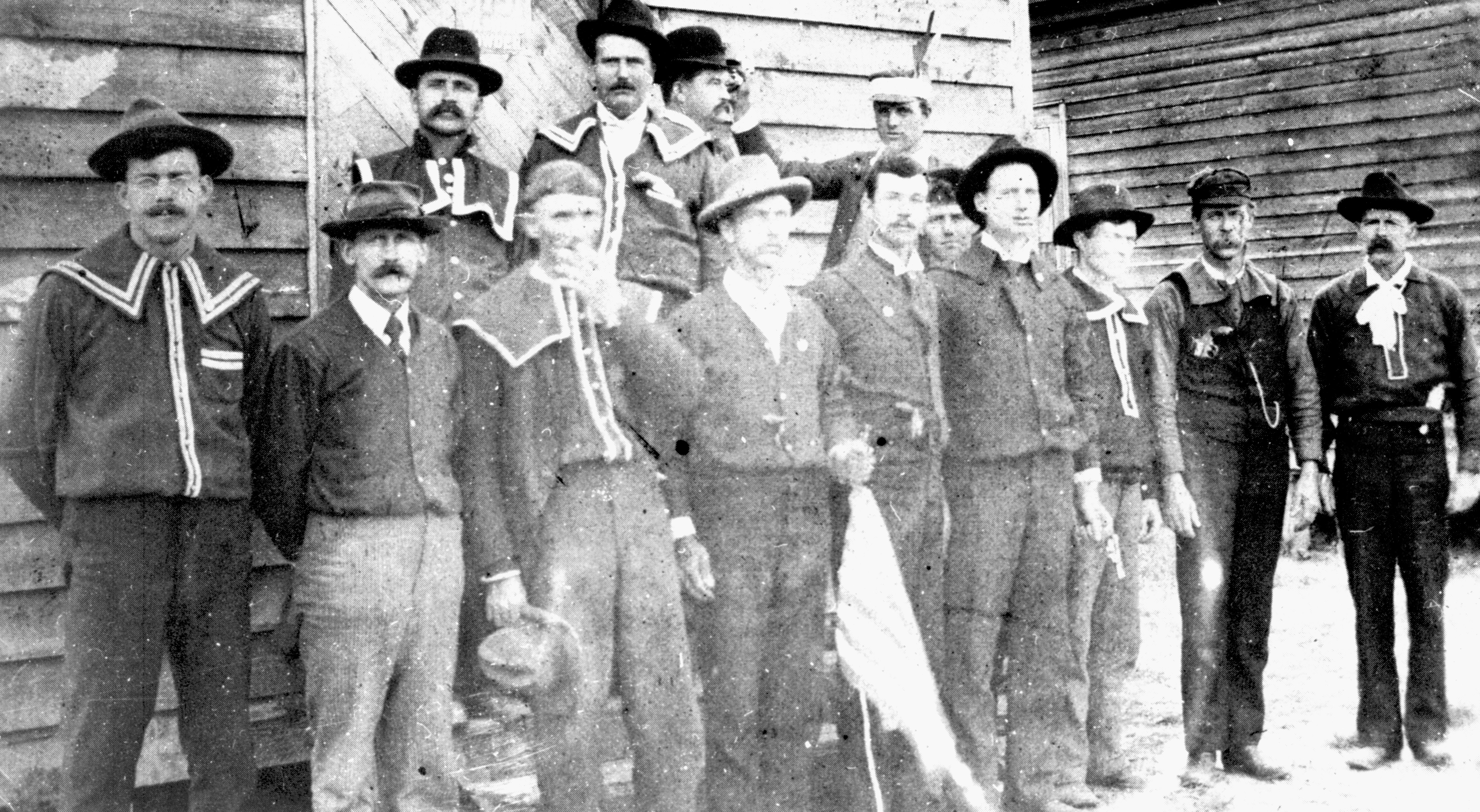
Red Shirts at Old Hundred, November 1898

By the late 19th century, Richmond County had a majority black population and tended to support the Republican Party in elections, while the state of North Carolina was typically dominated by the Democratic Party. In response to this, white Democrats built up a political base in Laurinburg. Legislator Maxey John introduced several unsuccessful bills in the North Carolina General Assembly to carve out a new county around Laurinburg between 1893 and 1897. During the state legislative elections of 1898, Democrats organized intensely in the area to unseat the statewide Fusionist coalition of state Republicans and Populists, including the deployment of paramilitary Red Shirts in Laurinburg to intimidate black residents and other opponents at the polls. Democrats regained their erstwhile majority in the General Assembly. In tribute to the efforts of Democrats in Laurinburg, on February 20, 1899, the assembly split off the town and the surrounding area from Richmond County and created the new Scotland County, named in homage to the Scottish settlers. Laurinburg was designated the county seat.

The creation of Scotland County took official effect on December 10, 1900. The first courthouse was erected in Laurinburg the following year. At its creation, the county was socially and politically dominated by its resident white planter class and businessmen. No black citizens were allowed to register to vote again until 1928. The county's first cotton mill was built in 1899. In subsequent years, additional textile mills were established, as was a cotton oil mill—the largest in the state at the time, a flour mill, and a fertilizer plant. A county road law was passed by the state in 1903, leading the county to construct its first improved roads of sand and clay. Another road law passed six years later led the county to greatly increase its road building program and erect its first concrete bridges.

=== Great Depression ===
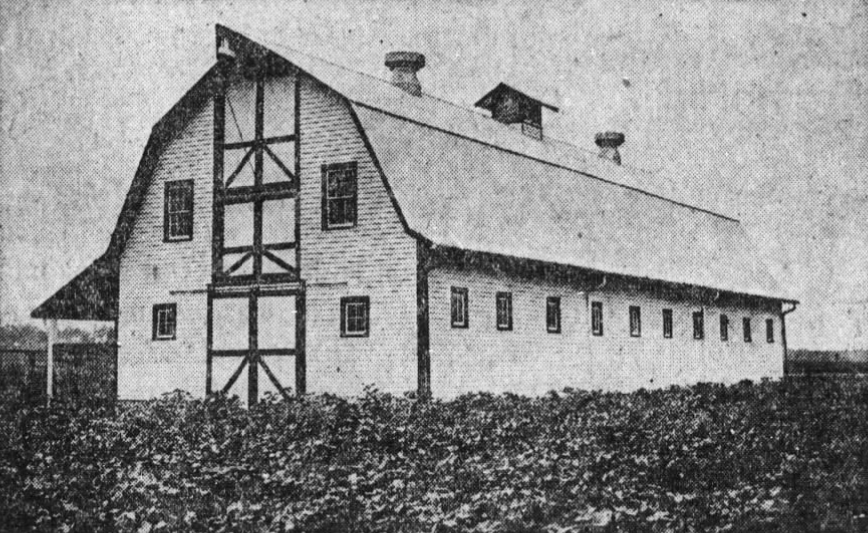
Cotton field and barn in Scotland County c. 1923. The county's cotton production peaked in 1920.

Scotland's black population increased in the 1910s and early 1920s as tenant cotton farmers moved north from the Deep South to escape areas infested by the boll weevil. County cotton production peaked in 1920 as farmers diversified their operations and began growing fruits and melons. Cotton nevertheless remained the dominant crop through the 1920s despite stagnating prices. The area suffered heavily during the Great Depression, as two banks in Laurinburg failed and a state report indicated that one fourth of the local population was destitute. Many smallholding farmers lost their lands in foreclosures and bankruptcies. The county nonwhite population dropped, and urbanization increased as people relocated to towns. In May 1934, 500 workers at textile mills in East Laurinburg went on strike in protest of work conditions and living conditions in their company-provided housing. The strike gained state-wide media attention after the strikers engaged in a brawl with loyalist workers, with nine people wounded by gunfire, before the dispute was resolved by arbitration. The United States Resettlement Administration purchased much of the low-quality land in the Sandhills portion of the county and turned it into a recreational area. The federal Agricultural Adjustment Act and Soil Conservation and Domestic Allotment Act of 1936 incentivized landowners to reduce production, and as a result, many local tenant farmers and sharecroppers were put out of work and migrated north in search of employment.

=== World War II and aftermath ===
During World War II, the United States government established Camp Mackall in the Sandhills portion of Scotland County to train paratroopers and the Laurinburg–Maxton Army Air Base in the east to train glider pilots. The latter facility was used to train about 30,000 personnel. Many local residents worked in civilian capacities at the Laurinburg–Maxton base, which provided them with a secure source of income. It closed in October 1945 and was turned into a civilian airport. Mechanization of agriculture in the 1950s led to depopulation in rural areas, as former farm laborers moved to Laurinburg, Wagram, and outside the county in search of new jobs; from 1950 to 1960, the population decreased by over 1,100 people. Much agricultural land was retired through the Soil Bank Program, and tenant farming and sharecropping rapidly declined. Agriculture continued to mechanize and consolidate into the 1970s.

Faced with the decline in agricultural employment, county leaders in the postwar era appealed for state and federal grants to improve local infrastructure and attract outside industry. Funds were acquired to build low-income housing, pave roads, and support the creation of a new hospital. The first outsider-owned manufacturing plant began operations in Scotland in 1959. A new courthouse was built in 1964. The county and Laurinburg school system were merged and racially integrated in the late 1960s.

=== 21st century ===
In the 2000s, the county's economy suffered a major downturn due to the departure of textile manufacturers. The Great Recession led to the closure and shrinking of other manufacturing businesses, leading its employment rate to peak at 18.6 percent in July 2011. In 2018, the county was heavily impacted by Hurricane Florence.

== Geography and physical features ==
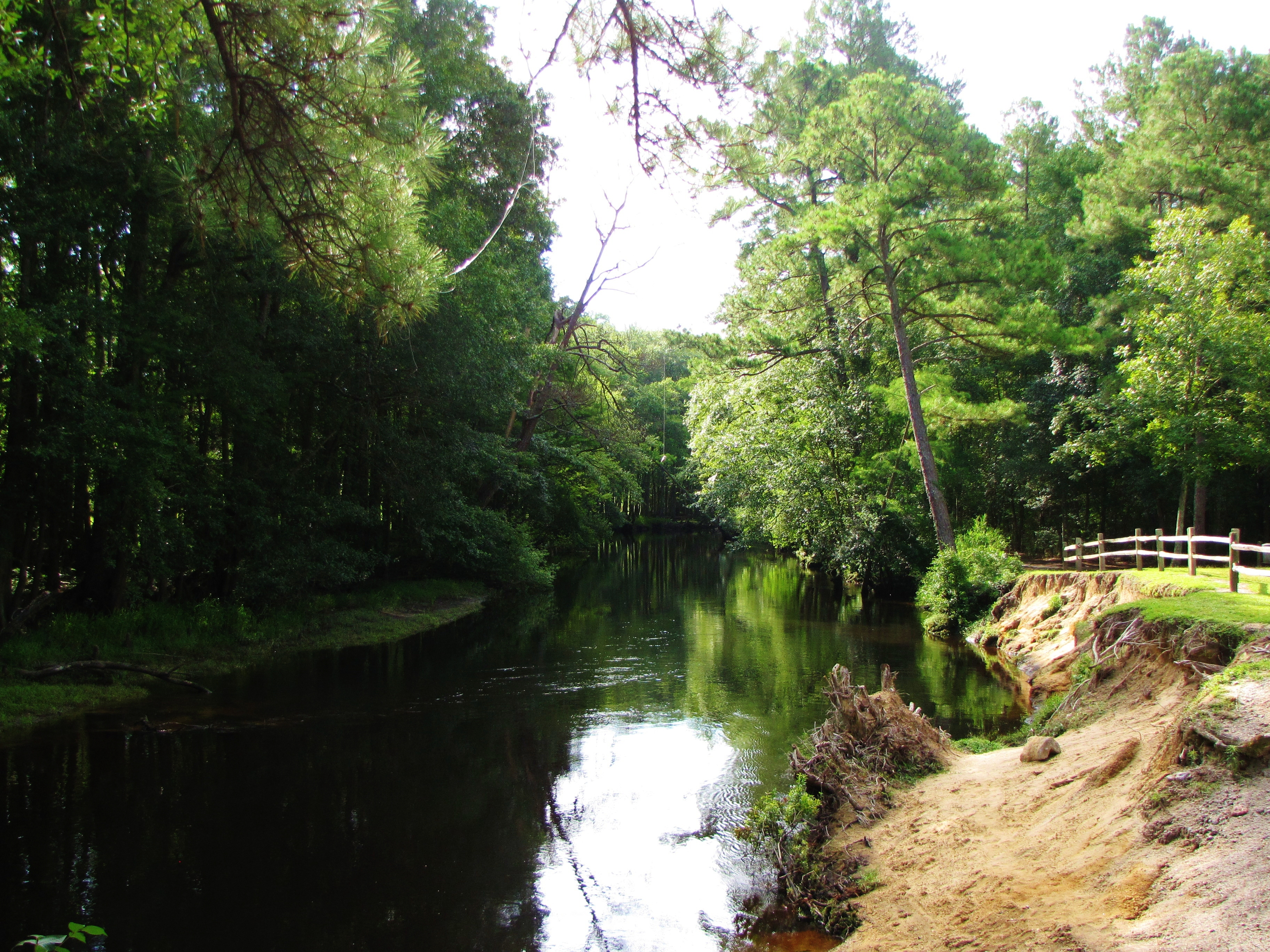
The Lumber River at Chalk Banks near Wagram

Located within the southeastern portion of the state of North Carolina, Scotland County rests at the border between the Coastal Plain and Piedmont regions. It is bordered by Hoke, Moore, Robeson, and Richmond counties, and Marlboro County in the state of South Carolina. According to the U.S. Census Bureau, the county has a total area of 320.62 square miles (830.4 km^{2}), of which 319.14 square miles (826.6 km^{2}) is land and 1.48 square miles (3.8 km^{2}) (0.46%) is water. It is the smallest North Carolina county by area. The elevation above sea level is 227 feet (69 m).

Scotland is one of the state's ten counties within the Sandhills region. The hills mostly populate the northern section of the county, with rest being largely flat. Geologically, most of the soil in Scotland consists of sand, sandstone, and mudstone, with the sandiest soils in the Sandhills. The extreme western portion of the county is in the Pee Dee River drainage basin, while the rest is in the Lumber River basin. The Lumber forms the eastern boundary of the county. Several smaller tributary watercourses, including Big Shoe Heel Creek, Juniper Creek, Jordan Creek, Leith Creek, Gum Swamp Creek, and Joes Creek, flow across the area and into the Lumber and Little Pee Dee rivers. Most such streams are blackwater and flow southward or southeastward. The county is also populated by several hundred Carolina bays, most of which are concentrated in the northeast, east, and just south of Laurinburg. Some of these form seasonal ponds, and there are several other manmade bodies of water including millponds.

The region generally experiences mild winters and hot summers. The average mean temperature in January is 44 °F (7 °C) while the mean in July is 80 °F (27 °C). The county on average sees about 47 inches (1,200 mm) of rainfall per year. Native trees include loblolly pine, sweetgum, red maple, and water oak. Longleaf pine grows in the Sandhills Game Land, a state nature preserve which covers part of Scotland County. The Sandhills region is also populated by fox squirrels. Other fauna in the county include Carolina gopher frogs, eastern tiger salamanders, and loggerhead shrikes. Portions of the Lumber River State Park are also in the county.

== Demographics ==
Interactive map of Scotland County

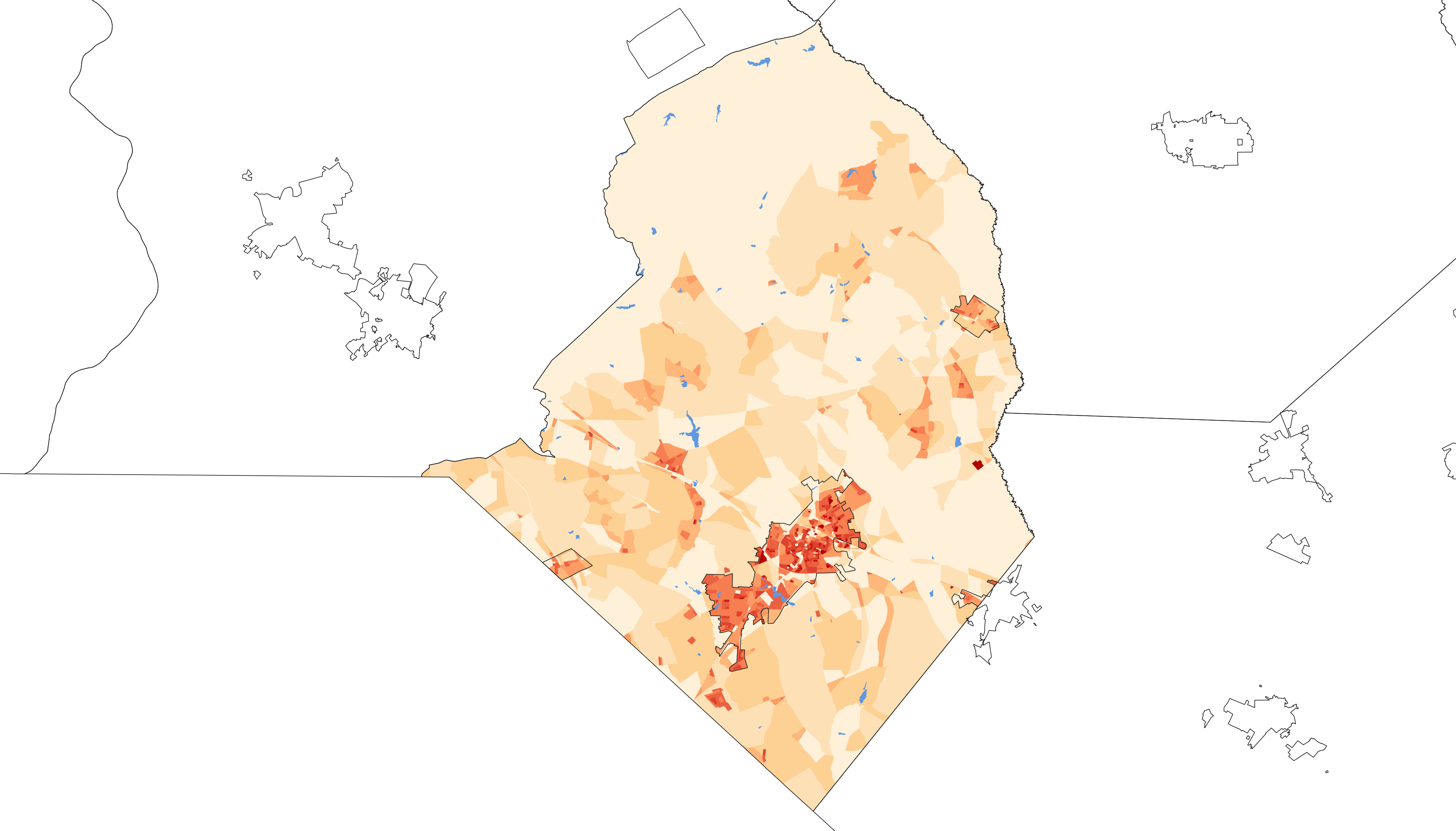
2020 population density of Scotland County NC by census block

Scotland County is included in the Fayetteville-Lumberton-Pinehurst, NC Combined Statistical Area.

=== 2020 census ===
As of the 2020 census, there were 34,174 people residing in the county. The median age was 41.9 years. 21.4% of residents were under the age of 18 and 19.8% of residents were 65 years of age or older. For every 100 females there were 104.3 males, and for every 100 females age 18 and over there were 103.3 males age 18 and over. Laurinburg recorded 15,024 residents. 47.5% of residents lived in urban areas, while 52.5% lived in rural areas.

Racially, 14,402 county residents identified as white (42.1%), 13,162 identified as black or African American (38.5%), 3,745 identified as American Indian and Alaska Native (11.0%), 343 identified as Asian (1.0%), 15 identified as Native Hawaiian or Pacific Islander (<0.1%), 718 identified as some other race (2.1%), and 1,789 identified as two or more races (5.2%). Of those residents, 1,106 (3.2%) identified as Hispanic or Latino. Scotland proportionately has the third-largest Native American population of any North Carolina county at 14 percent.

There were 12,870 households in the county, of which 29.5% had children under the age of 18 living in them. Of all households, 36.1% were married-couple households, 19.1% were households with a male householder and no spouse or partner present, and 38.9% were households with a female householder and no spouse or partner present. About 31.2% of all households were made up of individuals and 15.3% had someone living alone who was 65 years of age or older. There were 14,348 housing units, of which 10.3% were vacant. Among occupied housing units, 61.8% were owner-occupied and 38.2% were renter-occupied. The homeowner vacancy rate was 1.5% and the rental vacancy rate was 7.3%.

=== Racial and ethnic composition ===
Scotland County, North Carolina – Racial and ethnic composition Note: the US Census treats Hispanic/Latino as an ethnic category. This table excludes Latinos from the racial categories and assigns them to a separate category. Hispanics/Latinos may be of any race.
Race / Ethnicity (NH = Non-Hispanic)	Pop 1980	Pop 1990	Pop 2000	Pop 2010	Pop 2020	% 1980	% 1990	% 2000	% 2010	% 2020
White alone (NH)	18,639	18,867	18,398	16,605	14,247	57.75%	55.90%	51.11%	45.92%	41.69%
Black or African American alone (NH)	11,220	12,071	13,364	13,884	13,094	34.77%	35.76%	37.12%	38.40%	38.32%
Native American or Alaska Native alone (NH)	2,062	2,413	3,163	3,860	3,705	6.39%	7.15%	8.79%	10.68%	10.84%
Asian alone (NH)	53	81	182	276	339	0.16%	0.24%	0.51%	0.76%	0.99%
Native Hawaiian or Pacific Islander alone (NH)	x (Note: included in the Asian category in the 1980 Census)	x (Note: included in the Asian category in the 1990 Census)	3	7	15	x	x	0.01%	0.02%	0.04%
Other race alone (NH)	7	4	17	49	112	0.02%	0.01%	0.05%	0.14%	0.33%
Mixed race or Multiracial (NH)	x (Note: not an option in the 1980 Census)	x (Note: not an option in the 1990 Census)	448	722	1,556	x	x	1.24%	2.00%	4.55%
Hispanic or Latino (any race)	292	318	423	754	1,106	0.90%	0.94%	1.18%	2.09%	3.24%
Total	32,273	33,754	35,998	36,157	34,174	100.00%	100.00%	100.00%	100.00%	100.00%

=== Demographic change ===
Historical population

Historical population
Census	Pop.	Note	%±
1900	12,553		—
1910	15,363		22.4%
1920	15,600		1.5%
1930	20,174		29.3%
1940	23,232		15.2%
1950	26,336		13.4%
1960	25,183		−4.4%
1970	26,929		6.9%
1980	32,273		19.8%
1990	33,754		4.6%
2000	35,998		6.6%
2010	36,157		0.4%
2020	34,174		−5.5%
2025 (est.)	33,322	▼	−2.5%
U.S. Decennial Census; 1790–1960 1900–1990; 1990–2000 2010 2020

Scotland County has long had significant white, black, and Lumbee Indian populations. The Hispanic population grew in the early 21st century. From 2010 to 2020, Scotland County's population declined from 36,157 to 34,174, a decrease of about five percent. The proportion of county residents under the age of 18 dropped by 19.2 percent. According to the American Community Survey, from 2017 to 2021 there were an estimated 12,214 households in the county with an average of 2.65 persons per household. The North Carolina Office of State Budget and Management projects a 6.7 percent population decline in the county between 2020 and 2030. The North Carolina Rural Center reported a 0.25 percent increase in the county's population between 2020 and 2023.

== Law and government ==
=== Government ===
Scotland County is governed by a county commission. The commission is funded by a two percent share of local sales tax revenue and the local property tax. A third of the county's land is owned by the United States Forestry Service and the United States Armed Forces, from whom no tax revenue is collected. The armed forces operate the Luzon Drop Zone military airfield and Camp Mackall in the county (the latter only partially).

Scotland County is a member of the Lumber River Council of Governments, a regional planning board representing five counties. It is located entirely in North Carolina's 9th congressional district and is also included in the North Carolina Senate's 24th district and the North Carolina House of Representatives' 48th district. It is one of the four counties within the jurisdiction of the Lumbee Tribe of North Carolina, and tribal members within the county elect some members of the tribal council.

Scotland County lies within the bounds of North Carolina's 21st Prosecutorial District, the 16A Superior Court District, and the 16A District Court District. County voters elect a sheriff. The sheriff's office provides law enforcement in the unincorporated areas of the county, maintains the Scotland County Detention Center, and provides security at the Scotland County Courthouse.

=== Politics ===
Historical presidential election returns

United States presidential election results for Scotland County, North Carolina
Year	Republican		Democratic		Third party(ies)	
Year	No.	%	No.	%	No.	%
1900	44	4.53%	925	95.26%	2	0.21%
1904	65	9.14%	646	90.86%	0	0.00%
1908	85	10.64%	714	89.36%	0	0.00%
1912	9	1.08%	751	89.94%	75	8.98%
1916	137	12.74%	938	87.26%	0	0.00%
1920	306	15.22%	1,705	84.78%	0	0.00%
1924	205	12.17%	1,469	87.18%	11	0.65%
1928	588	25.03%	1,761	74.97%	0	0.00%
1932	208	7.37%	2,608	92.42%	6	0.21%
1936	314	8.98%	3,183	91.02%	0	0.00%
1940	250	7.74%	2,981	92.26%	0	0.00%
1944	303	11.33%	2,372	88.67%	0	0.00%
1948	359	12.74%	1,957	69.42%	503	17.84%
1952	1,590	35.32%	2,912	64.68%	0	0.00%
1956	1,171	27.79%	3,042	72.21%	0	0.00%
1960	1,279	25.99%	3,643	74.01%	0	0.00%
1964	1,229	24.23%	3,844	75.77%	0	0.00%
1968	1,717	28.69%	2,252	37.63%	2,016	33.68%
1972	3,485	63.69%	1,938	35.42%	49	0.90%
1976	1,932	30.26%	4,430	69.39%	22	0.34%
1980	2,133	31.45%	4,446	65.56%	203	2.99%
1984	4,077	50.23%	4,028	49.62%	12	0.15%
1988	3,199	45.16%	3,865	54.56%	20	0.28%
1992	2,980	31.84%	5,175	55.29%	1,205	12.87%
1996	2,858	34.44%	4,870	58.68%	571	6.88%
2000	3,740	39.77%	5,627	59.84%	36	0.38%
2004	5,141	44.52%	6,386	55.30%	20	0.17%
2008	6,005	42.24%	8,151	57.33%	61	0.43%
2012	5,831	41.19%	8,215	58.03%	110	0.78%
2016	6,256	44.92%	7,319	52.55%	353	2.53%
2020	7,473	50.58%	7,186	48.64%	116	0.79%
2024	7,767	53.10%	6,754	46.18%	105	0.72%

As of 2024, 45 percent of registered voters in Scotland County are Democrats, 21 percent are registered Republicans and 32 percent are unaffiliated. While the county has historically voted for Democratic candidates, in recent years it has become a swing county. Like other areas in the region, the county's voting patterns have trended more favorably to Republicans. Democratic voter registration shares declined from 58 percent of the county's registered voters in 2016 to 48 percent in 2022, while Republican and unaffiliated voter registration rates increased. Democratic presidential candidates Barack Obama and Hillary Clinton won the county in 2008, 2012, and 2016. In 2020, both Republican presidential candidate Donald Trump and Democratic gubernatorial candidate Roy Cooper secured a majority of its votes. In the 2024 elections, Republican presidential nominee Trump and Democratic gubernatorial nominee Josh Stein both won the county, while Republicans won a majority of the seats on the county commission, the first time they had done so in modern history. In the 2026 elections, Democratic candidates won in every partisan contest in the county and succeeded in regaining a majority on the county commission.

== Economy ==
Scotland County's economy is largely based in agriculture. Area farmers mostly grow corn, cotton, tobacco, and soybeans, and raise hogs. Forestry products including lumber and paper are also sourced in the county. Manufacturing firms increased in the county after 1950. The local manufacturing industry produces textiles, cabinet accessories, mobile homes, hospital equipment, and automotive parts. Following a national trend, manufacturing—especially in textiles—has declined since 2000, damaging the economy of the county. In the early 2020s retail grew along the U.S. Route 74 corridor. As of 2023, health care/social assistance, education, public administration, and manufacturing are the five highest-employing sectors in the county. In its 2026 county economic tier ratings, the North Carolina Department of Commerce classified Scotland as the state's fourth-most economically distressed county. It has long suffered from one of North Carolina's highest unemployment rates, with it having the highest rate at 5.6% in September 2024. According to the American Community Survey, from 2017 to 2021 the estimated median household income was $39,866. The child poverty rate is 46 percent.

== Transportation ==
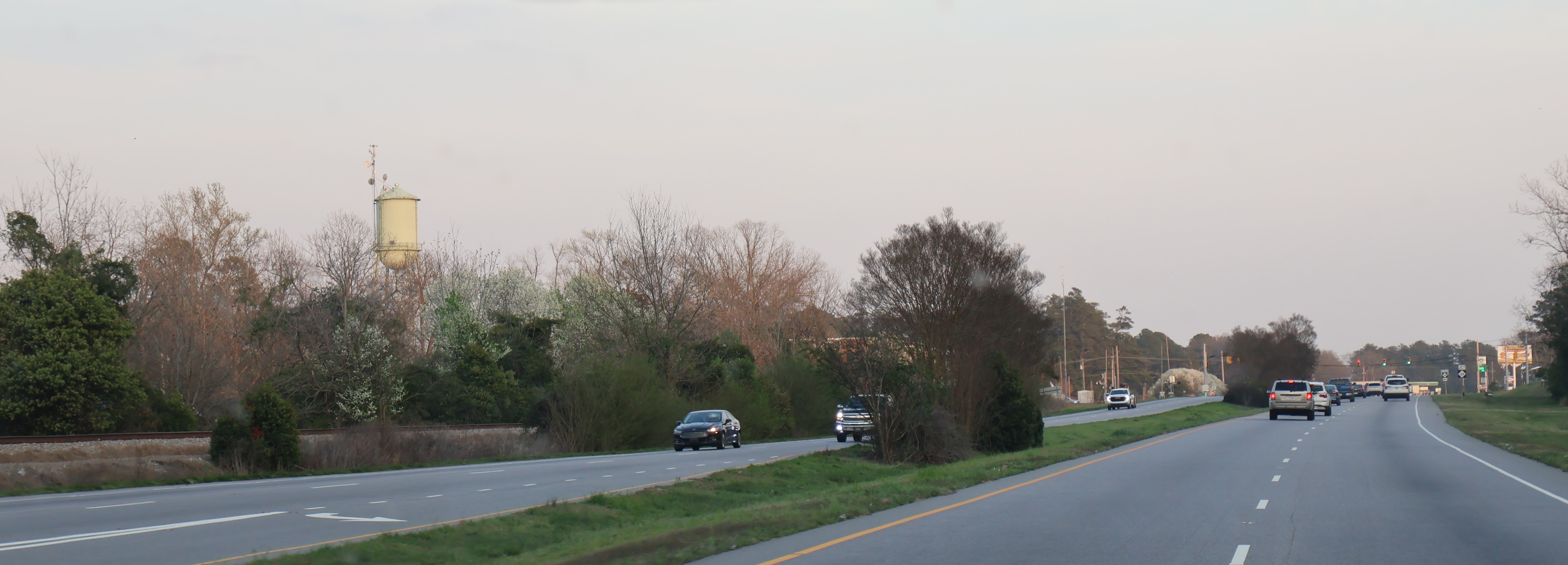
U.S. Route 74 in Laurel Hill

Scotland County will be served in the future by the two Interstate Highways of Interstate 73, planned to cross the county border for a short distance in the southwest; and Interstate 74, currently designated in the county as Future I-74. The current highways serving the county are U.S. Route 15 (Bus.), US 74 (Bus.), US 401 (Bus.), US 501, North Carolina Highway 71, NC 79, NC 44, and NC 381. County government supports a public transport bus service, the Scotland County Area Transit System. Airplane facilities are provided by the Laurinburg–Maxton Airport. Local railways are operated by CSX Transportation and the Laurinburg and Southern Railroad. The longest straight stretch of railroad track in the United States, spanning 78.86 miles, connects Wilmington to the east with the Scotland community of Old Hundred.

== Education ==
Scotland County Schools operates public schools in the area. As of 2023, the system operates 10 schools and serves 5,592 students. The system is led by a 5-member board elected in partisan contests. The district was classified by the North Carolina Department of Public Instruction as low-performing in 2021, but its rank improved past low-performing status in 2022. Scotland County is home to the historic Laurinburg Institute, the oldest black preparatory school still active in the United States, established in September 1904. The county hosts a satellite campus of the Richmond Community College and the now defunct St. Andrews University, a private liberal arts school. According to the 2021 American Community Survey, an estimated 15.3 percent of county residents have attained a bachelor's degree or higher level of education.

== Healthcare ==
Scotland County is served by a single hospital, Scotland Health Care System, based in Laurinburg. According to the 2022 County Health Rankings produced by the University of Wisconsin Population Health Institute, Scotland County ranked 98th in health outcomes of North Carolina's 100 counties. Per the ranking, 28 percent of adults say they are in poor or fair health, the average life expectancy is 73 years, and 14 percent of people under the age of 65 lack health insurance.

== Culture ==
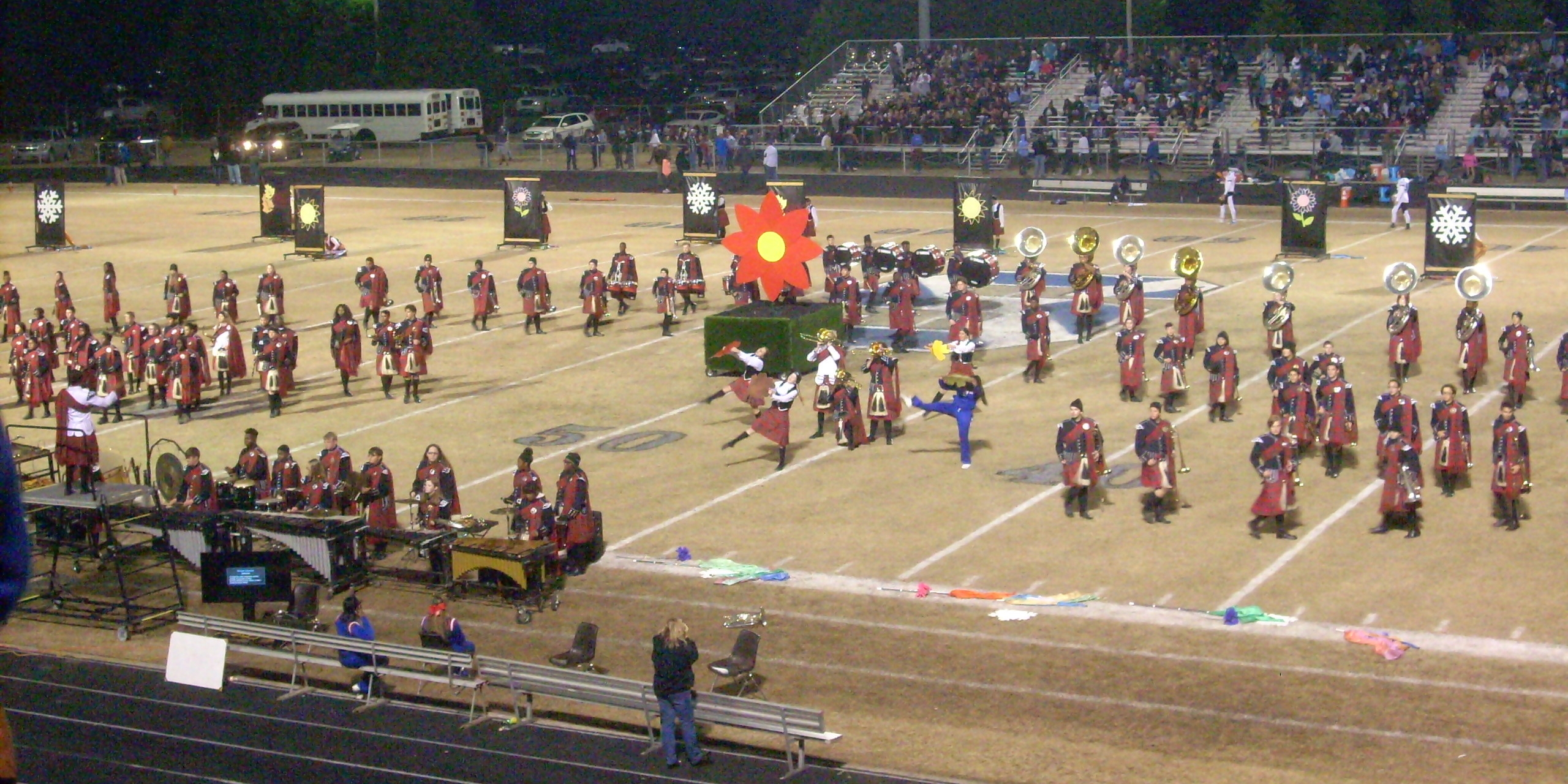
Scotland County High School's marching band, donning traditional Scottish kilts

Many surnames, streets, and places in Scotland County reflect Scottish origins. Since 2008, the county has hosted an annual Scotland County Highland Games festival in homage to the heavy Scottish ancestry of its population.

Scotland County High School's sports teams are called the Fighting Scots and the school marching band wears traditional Scottish garb, including kilts, sporrans, plaid shawls, and Glengarry bonnets.

The county also hosts an annual Kuumba festival to celebrate African American heritage. Several area buildings and sites have been listed on the National Register of Historic Places. Religion is a key part of local public life. Fishing is a popular recreational activity.

== Communities ==
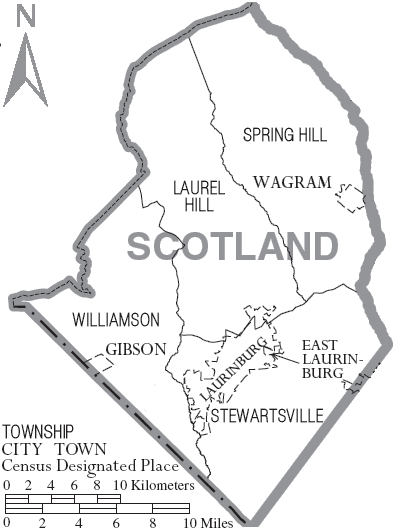
Map of Scotland County with municipal and township labels

=== Incorporated communities ===
- Laurinburg (county seat and largest community)
- Gibson
- Maxton (partially)
- Wagram

=== Townships ===
- Laurel Hill
- Spring Hill
- Stewartsville
- Williamson

=== Census-designated places ===
- Deercroft
- Laurel Hill
- Old Hundred
- Scotch Meadows

=== Unincorporated communities ===
- East Laurinburg
- Montclair

== See also ==
- List of counties in North Carolina
- National Register of Historic Places listings in Scotland County, North Carolina

== Works cited ==
- Abuya, Michael; Davis, Wayne (March 31, 2017), 2016 Scotland County Comprehensive Transportation Plan (PDF), North Carolina Department of Transportation
- Barrett, John G. (1995). The Civil War in North Carolina (reprint ed.). Chapel Hill: University of North Carolina Press. ISBN 978-0-8078-4520-2.
- Cooper, Christopher A. (2024). Anatomy of a Purple State : A North Carolina Politics Primer. Chapel Hill: The University of North Carolina Press. ISBN 9781469681719.
- Covington, Howard E. Jr; Ellis, Marion A. (1999). Terry Sanford: Politics, Progress, and Outrageous Ambitions. Durham: Duke University Press. ISBN 978-0-8223-2356-3.
- Davis, Anita Price (2008). New Deal Art in North Carolina: The Murals, Sculptures, Reliefs, Paintings, Oils and Frescoes and Their Creators. Jefferson: McFarland. ISBN 978-0-7864-3779-5.
- LeGrand, Harry E. Jr. (May 2005), An Inventory of the Significant Natural Areas of Scotland County, North Carolina, Raleigh: Office of Conservation and Community Affairs, Department of Environment and Natural Resources, OCLC 61287274
- Lowery, Malinda Maynor (2018). The Lumbee Indians: An American Struggle. Chapel Hill: UNC Press Books. ISBN 978-1-4696-4638-1.
- Marks, Stuart A. (2021). Southern Hunting in Black and White: Nature, History, and Ritual in a Carolina Community (reprint ed.). Princeton: Princeton University Press. ISBN 978-0-691-22686-6.
- McCormick, Leslie Purcell (January 2010), Scotland County Working Lands Protection Plan (PDF), North Carolina Department of Environmental Quality
- Powell, William S. (1976). The North Carolina Gazetteer: A Dictionary of Tar Heel Places. Chapel Hill: The University of North Carolina Press. ISBN 978-0-8078-1247-1.
- Stewart, John Douglas; Stewart, Sara (2001). Scotland County. Arcadia Publishing. ISBN 978-0-7385-1358-4.
- Tyner, K. Blake (2005). Robeson County in Vintage Postcards. Arcadia Publishing. ISBN 978-0-7385-4162-4.
