= Scotch Meadows, North Carolina =

- Unincorporated community
- Location within North Carolina Location within the United States
- Coordinates: 34°41′20″N 79°31′04″W
- Country: United States
- State: North Carolina
- County: Scotland

Area
  - Total: 0.34 sq mi (0.88 km^{2})
  - Land: 0.34 sq mi (0.88 km^{2})
  - Water: 0 sq mi (0.00 km^{2})
- Elevation: 190 ft (58 m)

Population (2020)
  - Total: 568
  - Density: 1,667.1/sq mi (643.68/km^{2})
- Time zone: UTC-5 (Eastern (EST))
  - Summer (DST): UTC-4 (EDT)
- ZIP code: 28352
- Area codes: 910, 472
- GNIS feature ID: 2629368

Scotch Meadows is an unincorporated community and census-designated place in Scotland County, North Carolina, United States. As of the 2020 census, Scotch Meadows had a population of 568.

== Geography ==
According to the U.S. Census Bureau, the community has an area of 0.341 square miles (0.88 km^{2}), all of it land.

== Demographics ==
Historical population
Census	Pop.	Note	%±
2020	568		—
U.S. Decennial Census
