= Blue Clay Farms, North Carolina =

- Unincorporated community
- Location within North Carolina Location within the United States
- Coordinates: 34°18′02″N 77°53′30″W
- Country: United States
- State: North Carolina
- County: New Hanover

Area
  - Total: 2.46 sq mi (6.36 km^{2})
  - Land: 2.44 sq mi (6.32 km^{2})
  - Water: 0.015 sq mi (0.04 km^{2})
- Elevation: 39 ft (12 m)

Population (2020)
  - Total: 168
  - Density: 68.9/sq mi (26.59/km^{2})
- Time zone: UTC-5 (Eastern (EST))
  - Summer (DST): UTC-4 (EDT)
- ZIP code: 28405
- Area codes: 910, 472
- GNIS feature ID: 2584310

Blue Clay Farms is an unincorporated community and census-designated place in New Hanover County, North Carolina, United States. Blue Clay Farms is located in the statistical township of Cape Fear. Its population was 168 as of the 2020 census. Blue Clay Farms was first listed as a CDP in the 2010 United States census.

== Geography ==
According to the U.S. Census Bureau, the community has an area of 2.455 square miles (6.36 km^{2}); 2.439 square miles (6.32 km^{2}) of its area is land, and 0.016 square miles (0.041 km^{2}) is water.

== Demographics ==
Historical population
Census	Pop.	Note	%±
2010	33		—
2020	168		409.1%
U.S. Decennial Census
