= Royal Pines, North Carolina =

- Census-designated place
- Location in Buncombe County and the state of North Carolina
- Coordinates: 35°28′41″N 82°30′13″W
- Country: United States
- State: North Carolina
- County: Buncombe

Area
  - Total: 2.72 sq mi (7.04 km^{2})
  - Land: 2.71 sq mi (7.03 km^{2})
  - Water: 0.0039 sq mi (0.01 km^{2})
- Elevation: 2,503 ft (763 m)

Population (2020)
  - Total: 4,127
  - Density: 1,520.6/sq mi (587.12/km^{2})
- Time zone: UTC-5 (Eastern (EST))
  - Summer (DST): UTC-4 (EDT)
- ZIP code: 28704
- Area code: 828
- FIPS code: 37-58260
- GNIS feature ID: 2403497

Royal Pines is a census-designated place (CDP) in Buncombe County, North Carolina, United States. As of the 2020 census, Royal Pines had a population of 4,127. It is part of the Asheville Metropolitan Statistical Area.

== Geography ==
Royal Pines is bordered to the west by U.S. Route 25A and the city limits of Asheville, and to the northeast by Mills Gap Road. Brown Mountain, with an elevation of 2,996 feet (913 m), occupies the center of the CDP.

According to the United States Census Bureau, the Royal Pines CDP has a total area of 2.7 square miles (7.0 km^{2}), all land.

== Demographics ==
Historical population
Census	Pop.	Note	%±
2020	4,127		—
U.S. Decennial Census

=== 2020 census ===
As of the 2020 census, Royal Pines had a population of 4,127. The median age was 45.7 years. 18.4% of residents were under the age of 18 and 23.3% of residents were 65 years of age or older. For every 100 females there were 98.4 males, and for every 100 females age 18 and over there were 95.2 males age 18 and over.

100.0% of residents lived in urban areas, while 0.0% lived in rural areas.

There were 1,757 households in Royal Pines, of which 23.8% had children under the age of 18 living in them. Of all households, 56.7% were married-couple households, 15.0% were households with a male householder and no spouse or partner present, and 22.8% were households with a female householder and no spouse or partner present. About 25.9% of all households were made up of individuals and 11.7% had someone living alone who was 65 years of age or older.

There were 1,900 housing units, of which 7.5% were vacant. The homeowner vacancy rate was 0.9% and the rental vacancy rate was 6.7%.

Racial composition as of the 2020 census
Race	Number	Percent
White	3,587	86.9%
Black or African American	143	3.5%
American Indian and Alaska Native	22	0.5%
Asian	44	1.1%
Native Hawaiian and Other Pacific Islander	4	0.1%
Some other race	54	1.3%
Two or more races	273	6.6%
Hispanic or Latino (of any race)	190	4.6%

=== 2000 census ===
As of the census of 2000, there were 5,334 people, 2,133 households, and 1,540 families residing in the CDP. The population density was 1,753.0 inhabitants per square mile (676.8/km^{2}). There were 2,303 housing units at an average density of 756.9 per square mile (292.2/km^{2}). The racial makeup of the CDP was 93.98% White, 3.47% African American, 0.13% Native American, 1.07% Asian, 0.37% from other races, and 0.97% from two or more races. Hispanic or Latino of any race were 0.79% of the population.

There were 2,133 households, out of which 34.0% had children under the age of 18 living with them, 59.9% were married couples living together, 9.5% had a female householder with no husband present, and 27.8% were non-families. 23.1% of all households were made up of individuals, and 5.0% had someone living alone who was 65 years of age or older. The average household size was 2.45 and the average family size was 2.90.

In the CDP, the population was spread out, with 24.3% under the age of 18, 5.4% from 18 to 24, 29.7% from 25 to 44, 28.4% from 45 to 64, and 12.3% who were 65 years of age or older. The median age was 40 years. For every 100 females, there were 91.0 males. For every 100 females age 18 and over, there were 87.0 males.

The median income for a household in the CDP was $52,426, and the median income for a family was $60,885. Males had a median income of $42,679 versus $29,188 for females. The per capita income for the CDP was $27,886. About 0.4% of families and 2.5% of the population were below the poverty line, including 1.4% of those under age 18 and 2.2% of those age 65 or over.
