= Old Hundred, North Carolina =

- Unincorporated community
- Location within North Carolina Location within the United States
- Coordinates: 34°49′46″N 79°35′25″W
- Country: United States
- State: North Carolina
- County: Scotland

Area
  - Total: 0.97 sq mi (2.51 km^{2})
  - Land: 0.97 sq mi (2.51 km^{2})
  - Water: 0 sq mi (0.00 km^{2})
- Elevation: 312 ft (95 m)

Population (2020)
  - Total: 218
  - Density: 225/sq mi (86.7/km^{2})
- Time zone: UTC-5 (Eastern (EST))
  - Summer (DST): UTC-4 (EDT)
- ZIP code: 28351
- Area codes: 910, 472
- GNIS feature ID: 1021733

Old Hundred is an unincorporated community and census-designated place (CDP) in Scotland County, North Carolina, United States. As of the 2020 census, Old Hundred had a population of 218. Old Hundred has the lowest per capita income ($5,846) of any CDP in North Carolina.

== History ==
Old Hundred was originally calculated to be the 100-mile-marker point along the Wilmington, Charlotte and Rutherford Railroad, traveling west of Wilmington. The calculation was inaccurate and later corrected, but the name remained. The longest straight stretch of railroad track in the United States, spanning 78.86 miles (126.91 km), connects Old Hundred and Wilmington.

== Geography ==
According to the U.S. Census Bureau, the community has an area of 0.971 square miles (2.51 km^{2}), all of it land. U.S. Route 74 passes through the community.

== Demographics ==
Historical population
Census	Pop.	Note	%±
2020	218		—
U.S. Decennial Census

== Works cited ==
- Marks, Stuart A. (2021). Southern Hunting in Black and White: Nature, History, and Ritual in a Carolina Community. Princeton University Press. ISBN 9780691226866.
- Tyner, K. Blake (2005). Robeson County in Vintage Postcards. Arcadia Publishing. ISBN 9780738541624.
