= Oak Island (North Carolina) =

Island in Brunswick County, North Carolina, United States

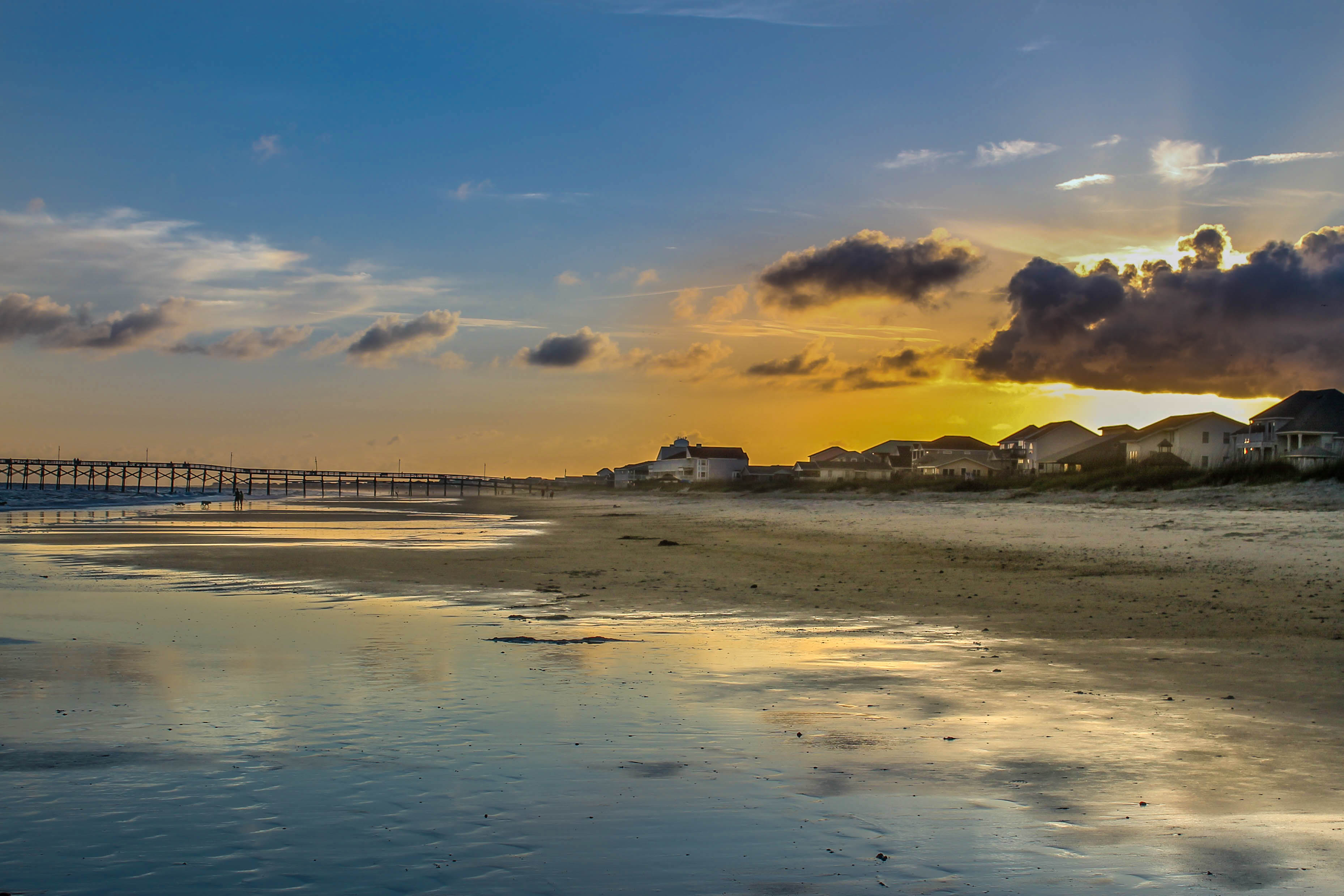
- Oak Island beach at sunset

- Location within North Carolina
- Interactive map of Oak Island

Geography
- Location: Atlantic Ocean
- Coordinates: 33°54′37″N 78°03′38″W
- Length: 12 mi (19 km)

Administration
- USA

Oak Island is located on the Atlantic Ocean coast in Brunswick County, North Carolina near the South Carolina border. A barrier island, it contains the towns of Oak Island and Caswell Beach, Fort Caswell (since 1949 home to the North Carolina Baptist Assembly) and the Oak Island Coast Guard Station which is co-located with the Oak Island Lighthouse. Almost 13 miles long, the island averages about one mile wide. As of 2020 the island had 8,791 permanent residents, while the summertime population can swell to nearly 50,000.

== Geography ==
Roughly 30 miles south of Wilmington, North Carolina, Oak Island is the easternmost of the South Brunswick Islands formed in the late 1930s by the construction of the Intracoastal Waterway (ICW). Dredged from Southport, North Carolina at the mouth of the Cape Fear River, the ICW flows west through coastal sounds and marshes to the Little River in South Carolina. Both ends of Oak Island have extensive marshland, while its two major internal waterways (Davis Canal and Montgomery Slough) run east to west and drain into the Lockwood Folly River. Elevations range from sea level to a 50' high knoll on the west end of the island.

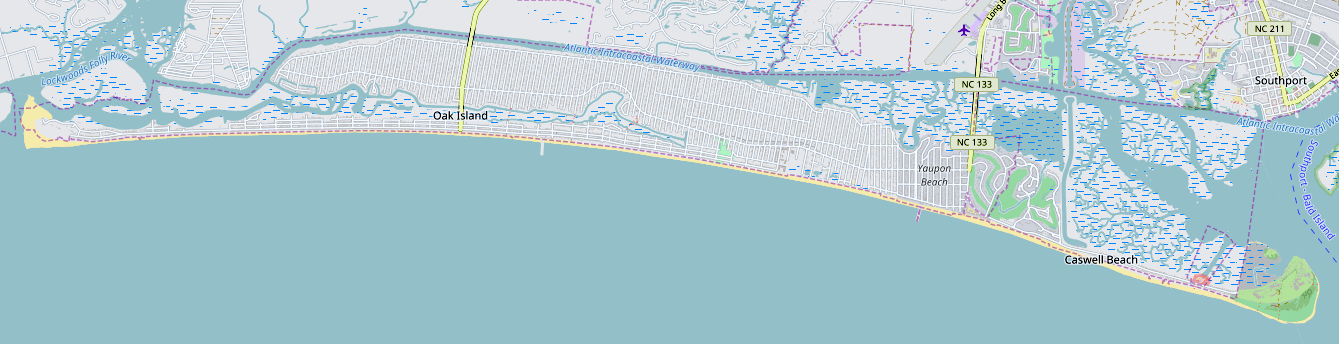
Oak Island Map

== History ==
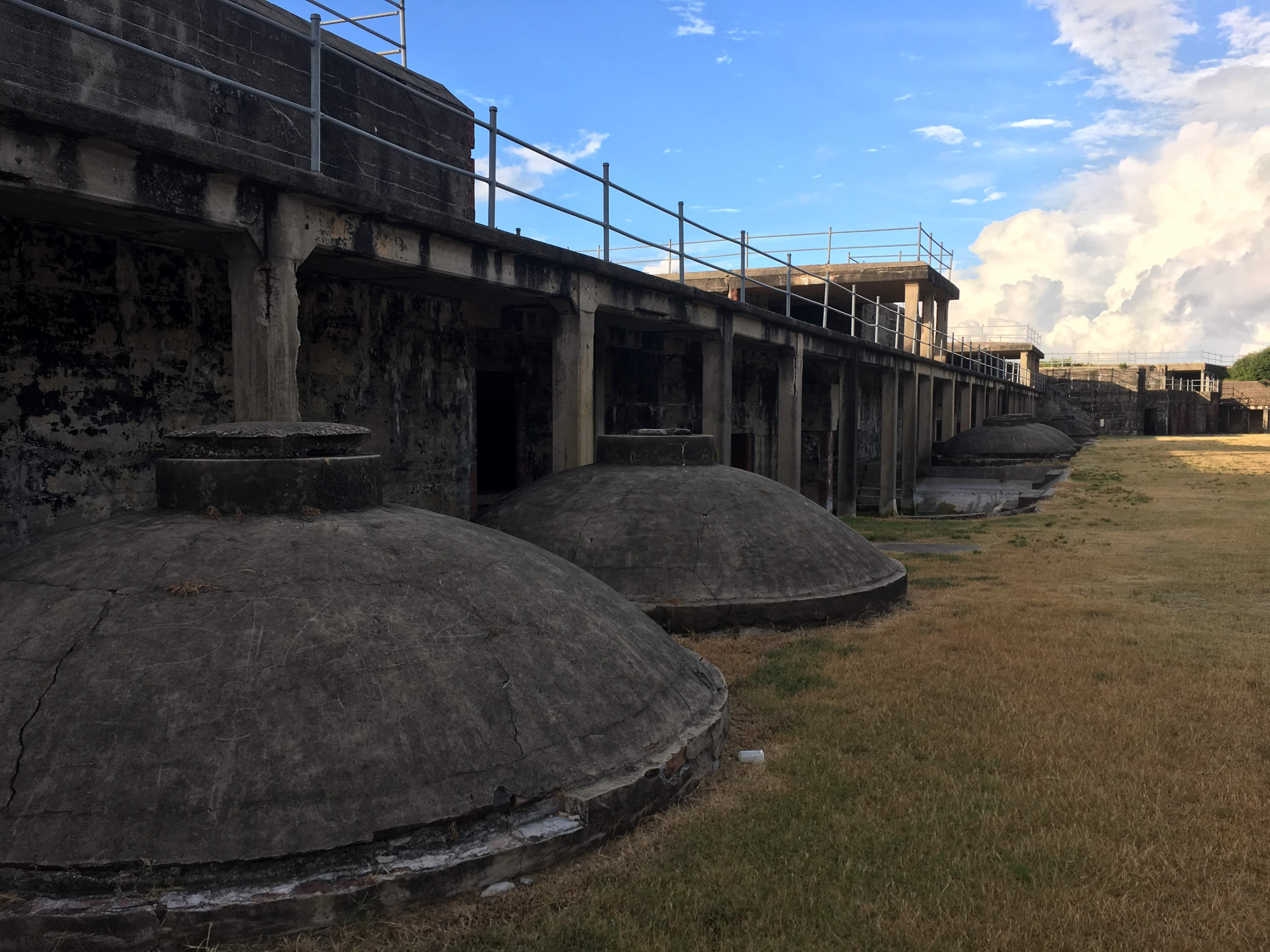
Fort Caswell Battery Swift

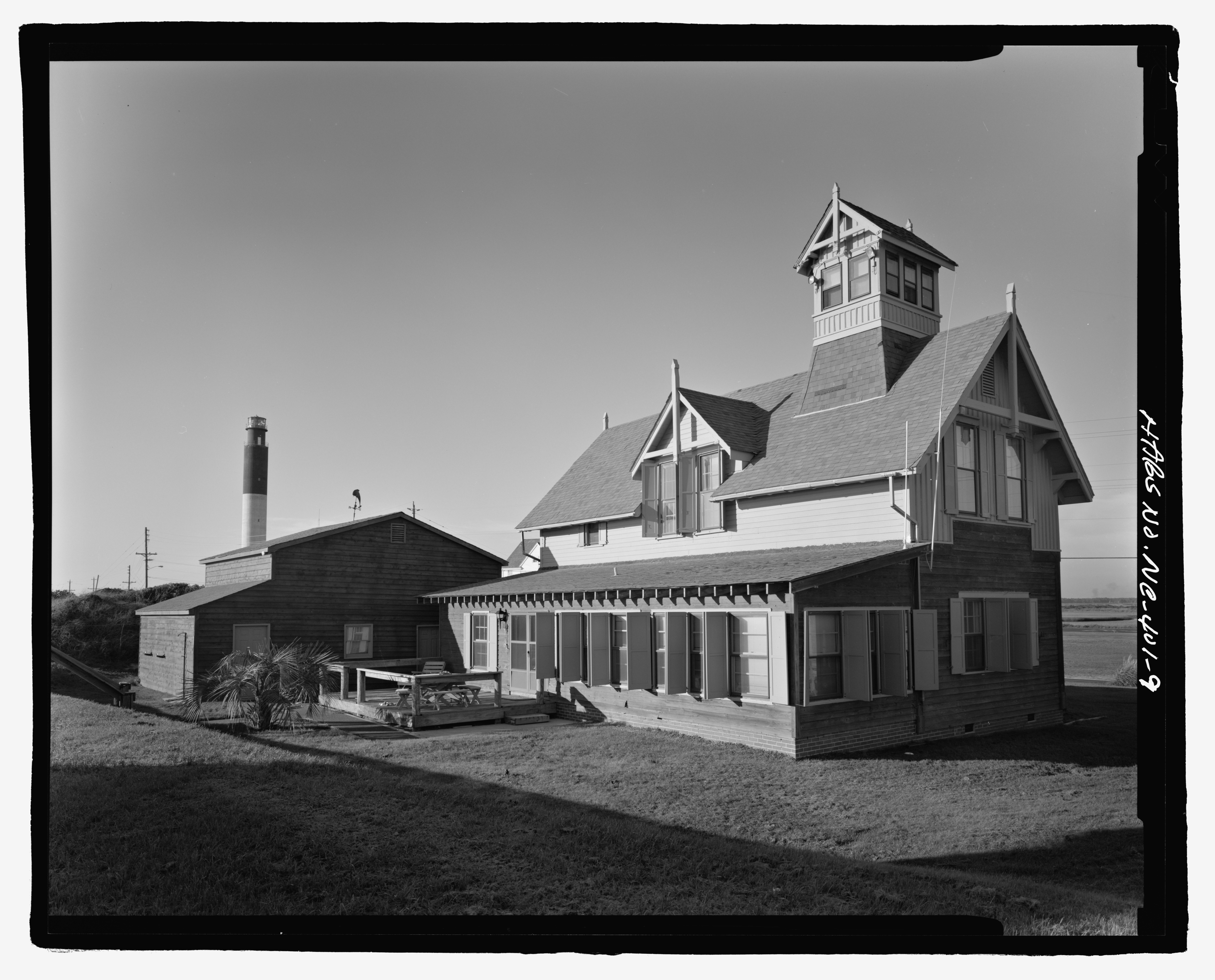
Oak Island Life-Saving Station

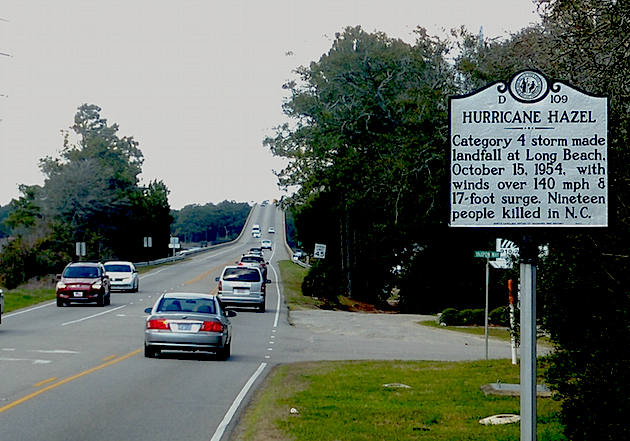
NC133 "Hazel" Historic Marker

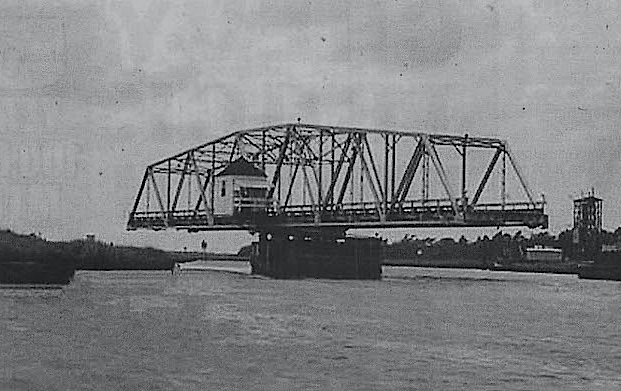
Oak Island Swingbridge circa 1950

While Native Americans most likely used the island for fishing, the first permanent settlement took place in the 1830s on the island's east end at Fort Caswell. Now utilized as a Christian retreat and conference center, during the Civil War the fort defended Confederate positions on the North Carolina coast and subsequently served as an army training ground in World War I and a patrol/ communications base in World War II. In 2013, along with the Fort Caswell Rifle Range constructed during WWI, it was designated as a National Historic District.

In the early 1800s, in recognition of the dangers to navigation caused by Frying Pan Shoals, Jay Bird Shoals, and Bald Head Shoals, which lay south and southeast of the island, construction of a series of lighthouses and life saving stations in the area began. On Bald Head Island, this construction included Old Baldy completed in 1817, and on Oak Island, the 1889 Oak Island Life Saving Station located 1/2 mile west of Fort Caswell. Still standing today, this building features a large lookout tower projecting from its roof. In 1938 it was sold to a private owner and moved directly across the road from its original location near where the current lighthouse stands.

By the 1930s the island had blossomed into a vacation resort as beach cottages began to dot the area on its western half, something which Hurricane Hazel brought a temporary halt to in 1954 as it washed away some 350 buildings on or near the ocean front. One of the greatest natural disasters to ever affect the state, Hazel was also one of the most destructive hurricanes to strike the United States. The island quickly recovered and development continued anew with the towns of Long Beach and Yaupon Beach being incorporated in 1955; in 1999 they were jointly incorporated into the Town of Oak Island.

Beach erosion has been a continuing problem for the island, with the first major success in restoration, the 2001 sand deposition on the east end of the island using material dredged from the Wilmington Harbor Channel. Since then, two similar projects have been completed along with other, smaller efforts, e.g two Sea Turtle Habitat Restoration Projects. Concern about the beach has also occasioned the creation of Beach Preservation Trust funds by both the Towns of Oak island and Caswell Beach and the formation of active citizen groups supporting the Natural Resources Defense Council "Protect our Coast" effort. One such group, familiarly known as the Crabbies was a key player in the Brunswick County effort opposing seismic testing and off shore drilling as proposed the Bureau of Ocean Energy Management (BOEM). In 1958, the Oak Island Lighthouse became operational. Located on the east end of the island, in 2004 the Town of Caswell Beach acquired it and in 2007 it was added to the National Register of Historic Places. In 1962 the first 9 holes of the Oak Island Golf Club designed by George Cobb opened for play. The second nine holes was completed in 1975, the same year the Town of Caswell Beach was incorporated. As a result of both the course and island's sequential development, 13 holes of the golf course are in Caswell Beach while five holes are in the Town of Oak Island.

Along with this increasing level of development came strident demands for reliable access to and from the island. When the ICW was completed, a swingbridge initially provided this service. Destroyed by a barge strike in 1971, construction of a high rise replacement (Barbee Bridge) began almost immediately; it opened for traffic in 1975 (interim service included a ferry and pontoon bridge). A second high rise structure (Swain's Cut Bridge) crossing was completed in 2010.

== Climate ==
Summers on Oak Island are hot and humid with an average temperature of 85˚, although the beach front is cooled much of the time by sea breezes (the prevailing winds are from the southwest). Ocean water temperatures range from the 50s to the mid 80s. Winters are moderate with an average temperature in the 50s (°F), albeit with brief cold periods. Rain occurs throughout the year with average annual rainfall approximately 57", 45% of this falling between June and September. Tropical storms are a continuing source of concern, e.g., in the 1996-1999 period, four major hurricanes (Bertha, Fran, Bonnie, and Floyd) made landfall and had significant effects on the area. More recently, in October 2016, the eye of Hurricane Matthew passed almost directly over the island inflicting significant damage to the dune system, and then in September 2018, Hurricane Florence caused severe flooding and wind damage in addition to washing away most of the beach sand added earlier in the year.

== Recreation and activities ==
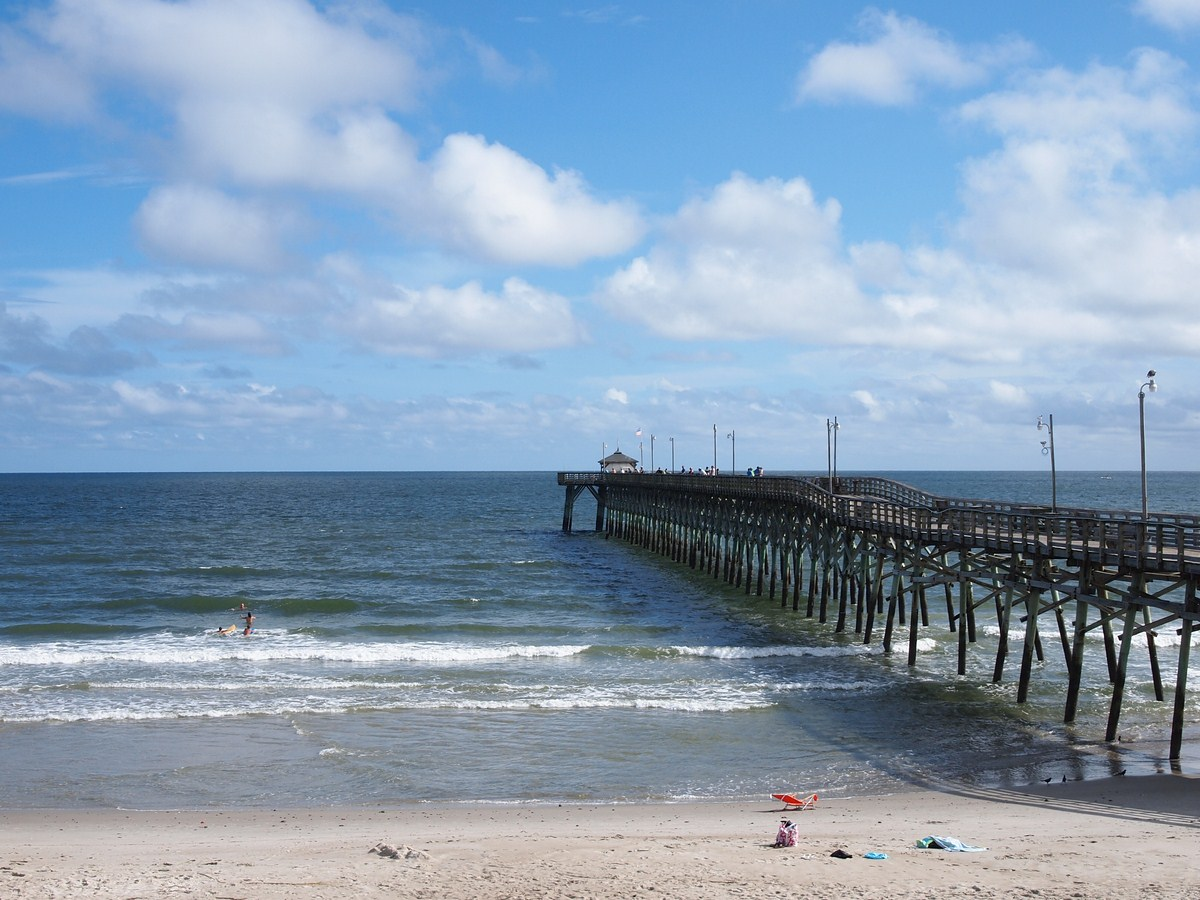
Ocean Crest Fishing Pier

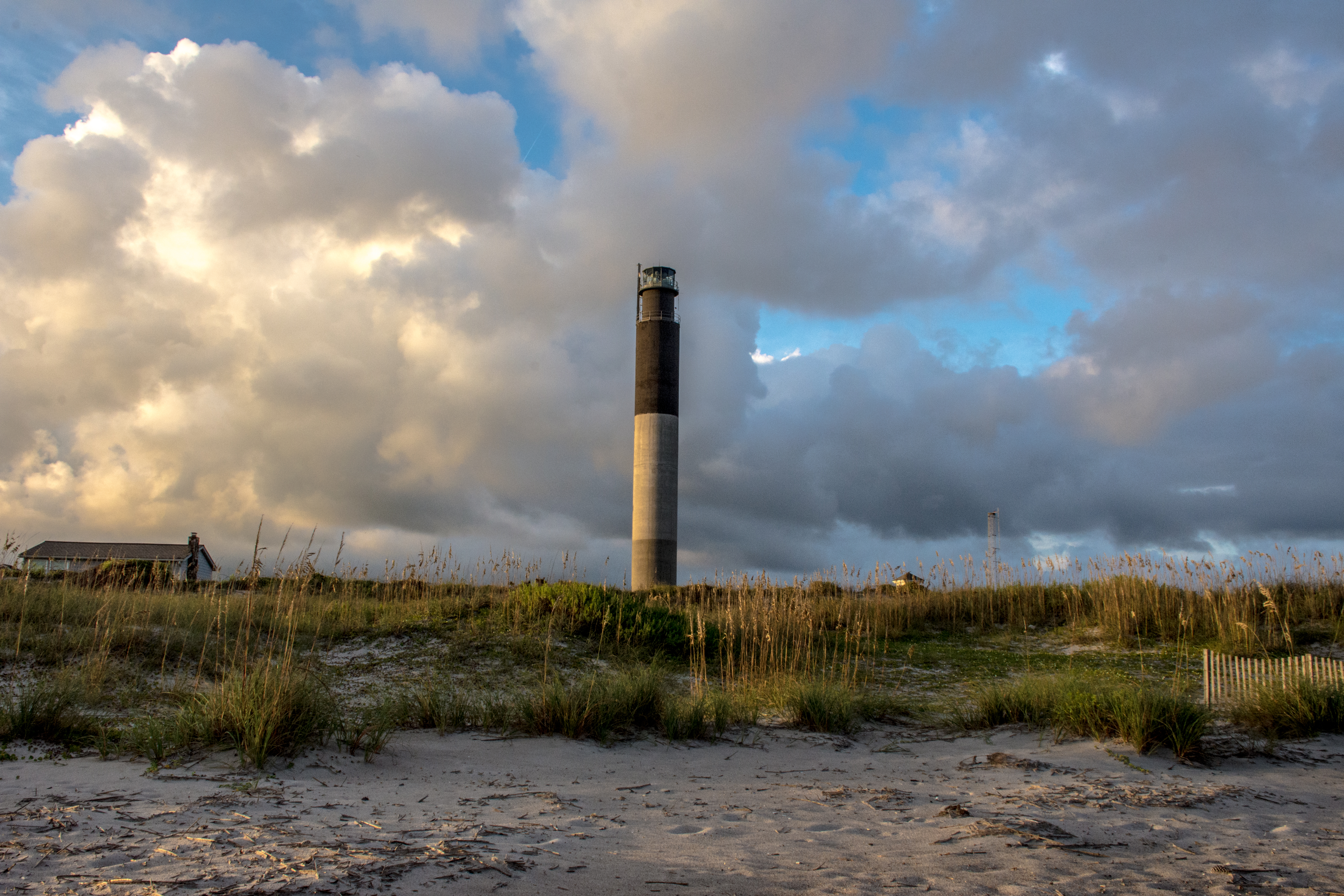
Oak Island Lighthouse

Primarily a family beach type locale, the island also provides many other types of recreational activity. The Oak Island Golf course and its related practice facilities are open to the public and an outdoor swimming pool is available for its members' use during the summer. Two fishing piers jut out into the Atlantic: the Oak Island Pier and the Ocean Crest Pier while motor/sail boats moored to piers dot the ICW as well as the Davis Canal and Montgomery Slough. All these waterways also attract a large number of kayakers. The Oak Island Recreation Center located mid-island provides both indoor and outdoor exercise facilities and rents out sports equipment and amenities like balloon tire, beach wheelchairs. A popular sporting event, ”Run Oak Island" held each February, features a marathon, half-marathon, 10K and 5K races. As for other activities, the Town of Oak Island puts on an ocean front fireworks display as part of its Fourth of July festivities, and a parade down Oak Island Drive just before Christmas. Tours of the Oak Island Lighthouse can be scheduled year round, with trips to the top available by appointment given two weeks advance notice (four weeks in the summer months). Monthly Civil War Roundtables are held at the Hatch Auditorium in the NC Baptist Assembly while the Oak Island Library hosts a wide variety of events to include "Socrates Cafe" and "Meet the Author" programs.
