= Coast Guard Station Oak Island =

US Coast Guard station in North Carolina

- Part of 5th District
- Caswell Beach, North Carolina

Site information
- Type: Coast Guard Station
- Owner: United States Coast Guard

Location
- Coordinates: 33°53′20″N 78°01′20″W

Site history
- Built: 1899
- In use: 1899-Present

Coast Guard Station Oak Island referred to locally as the Oak Island Coast Guard Station (OICGS) is located in the Town of Caswell Beach on Oak Island in Brunswick County, North Carolina. A part of the Cape Fear region, the station is in the United States Coast Guard 5th District which is charged with ensuring the safety and security of the oceans, coastal areas, and marine transportation system within the Mid-Atlantic Region. The district encompasses some 156,000 square miles of ocean, bays, rivers, wetlands and tidal marshes, geographic waterways, several major mid-Atlantic ports, and the Nation's capital. They also patrol the mouth of the Cape Fear River in Southport, North Carolina and the Intracoastal Waterway (ICW)

== History ==
In the early 1800s, in recognition of the dangers to navigation caused by Frying Pan Shoals, Jay Bird Shoals, and Bald Head Shoals which lay south and southeast of Cape Fear, construction of a series of lighthouses and life saving stations in the area began. In 1888 the War Department designated a portion of Fort Caswell on the east end of Oak Island for use a life-saving station. Although it still owned the land, it gave the Treasury Department permission to occupy the beach in front of the fort to construct what would turn out to be the Oak Island Life Saving Station. Completed in 1889, this building was sold to a private owner in 1938 and is now a residence sitting across from the existing station's main gate.

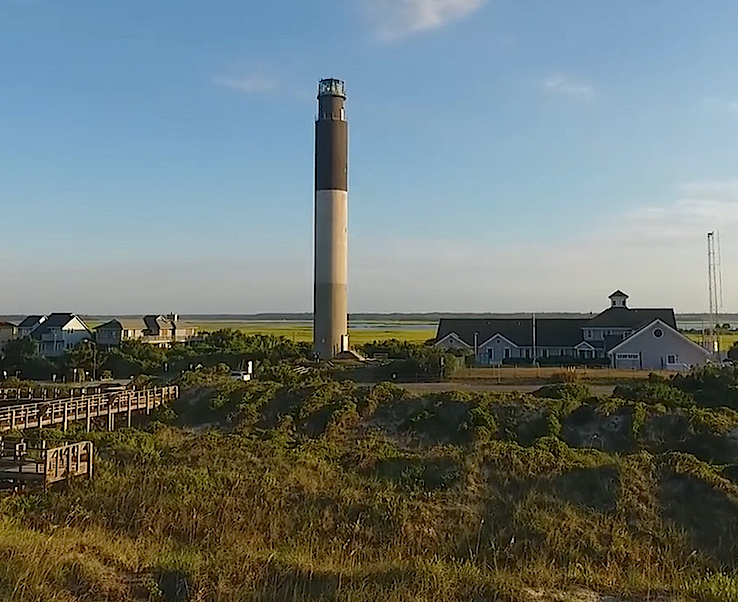
Lighthouse/OIGCS Site

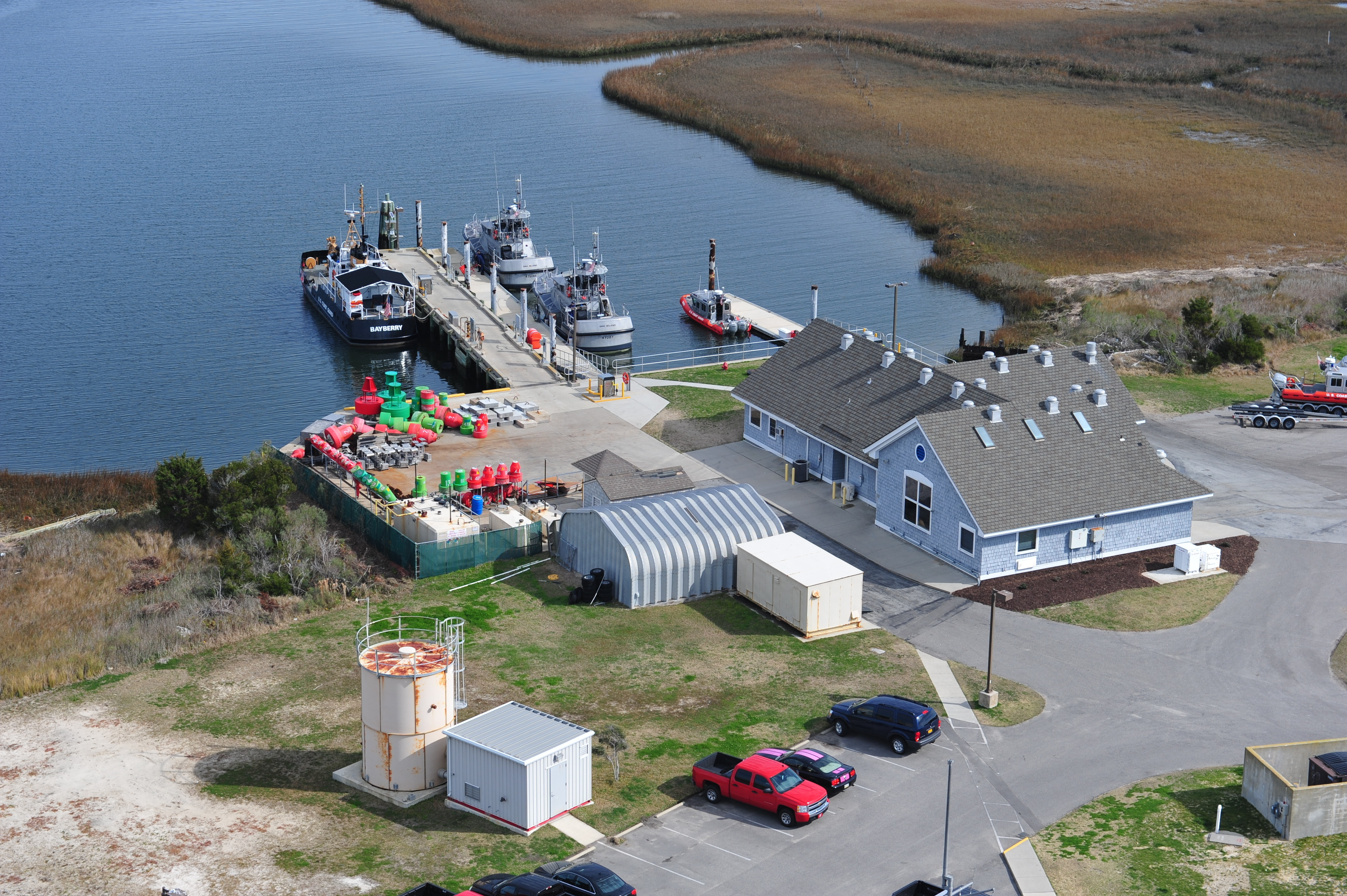
OICGS Dock Area

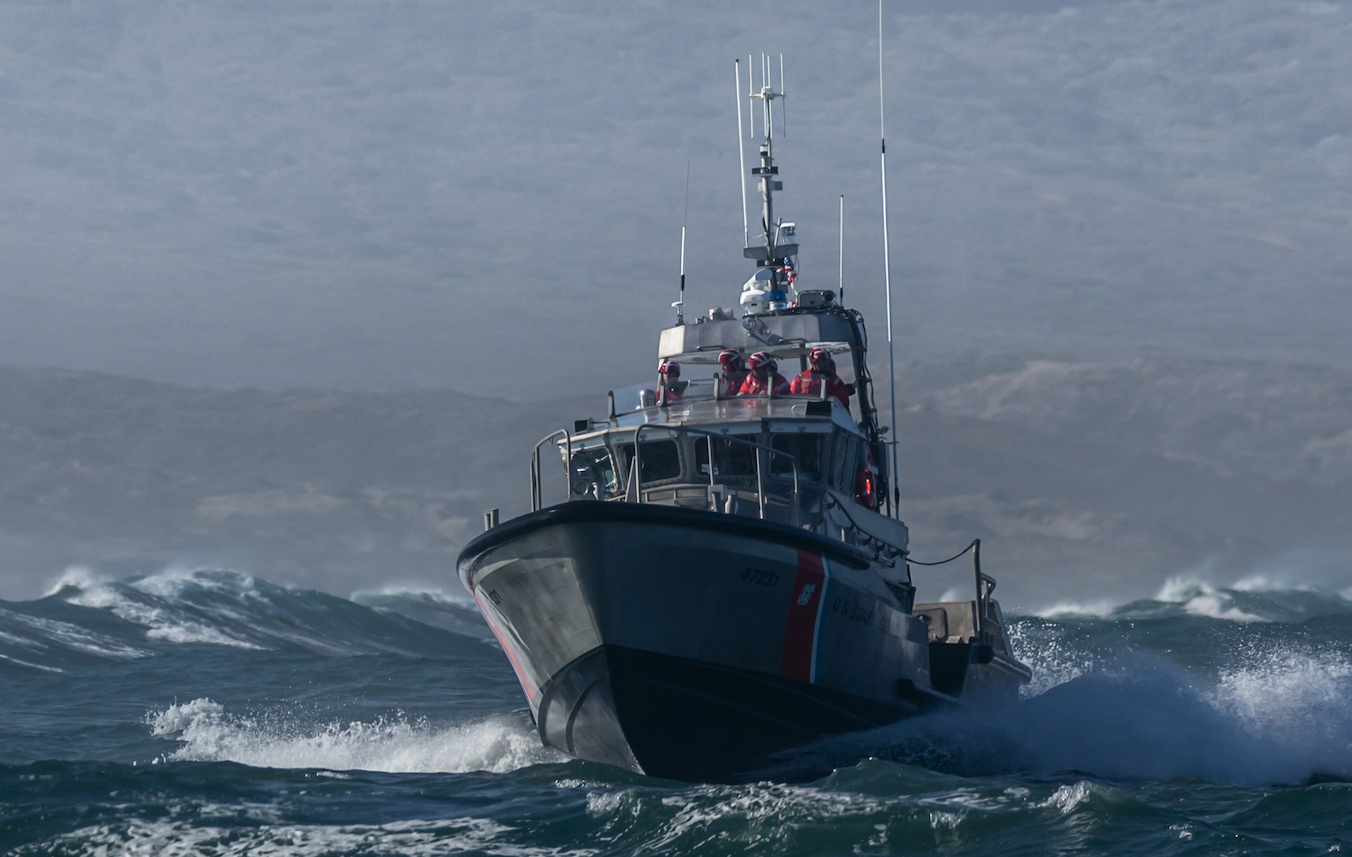
USCG 47' Motor Lifeboat

Eventually the Treasury Department acquired 57.2 acres of Fort Caswell by an act of Congress and in the late 1930s built the Oak Island Coast Guard Station. Then in May 1958, the Oak Island Lighthouse immediately west of the Coast Guard Station became operational. In 1992, a 10,000 square foot headquarters/barracks building was built next to the lighthouse but accidentally burned to the ground in February 2002; it was quickly replaced by the present structure which was commissioned in July 2004. That same year, the lighthouse which had already been designated as surplus property, was deeded to Town of Caswell Beach by the Federal Government along with its adjacent oceanfront property. The transfer agreement requires the town to maintain the property with the Coast Guard continuing to be responsible for operating the beacon.

== Facilities ==
Immediately east of the station's main building is a helicopter pad and on its north perimeter is a dredged ship channel which provides access to the Atlantic Ocean via the Intracoastal Waterway and the Southport Channel. The station currently supports 6 waterborne assets: One 49-ft Buoy Utility Stern Loading (BUSL), one 26-ft Trailerable Aids to Navigation Boat (TANB) two 29-ft Response boat - Small II, also known as RB-S II, and two 47′ motor lifeboats (MLB). CG47230 & CG47287 These patrol boats are noted for their exceptional ability to operate in high seas, surf, and heavy weather conditions with a unique feature that they can self-right in only 30 seconds if knocked over by waves or surf. There are currently 117 MLBs in the Coast Guard inventory. The station also serves as home base to the US Coast Guard Auxiliary Flotilla 10-5 which celebrated its 50th anniversary in May 2017.
