= We're Crabby About Drilling =

American environmental advocacy group

- Formation: 2018
- Members: 40+
- Founder: Judy Droitcour

We're Crabby About Drilling is an advocacy group formed by citizens living on Oak Island, North Carolina, focused on preventing off-shore drilling and seismic testing. Known locally as the "Oak Island Crabbies" the group is opposed to the federal government's proposed plan for ocean drilling and seismic blasting in the Cape Fear littoral as set forth in the Bureau of Ocean Energy Management (BOEM) Draft Proposed Program for 2019–2104.

== History ==
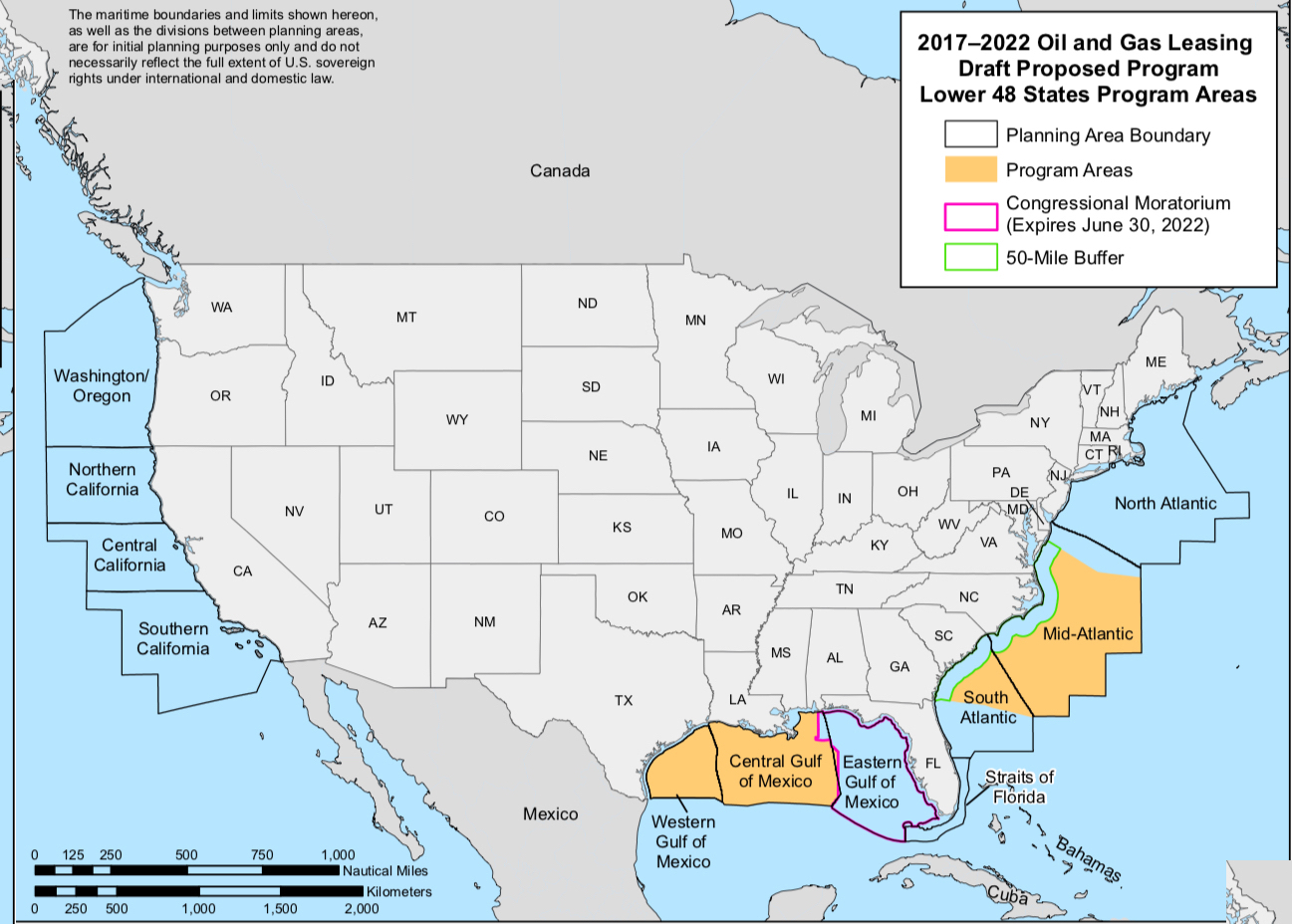
Proposed Offshore Drilling Areas

In 2014, Kure Beach, North Carolina, a small town in New Hanover County immediately north of Brunswick County, became one of the first municipalities to oppose off shore drilling in the Atlantic Ocean. Since then more than 130 municipalities, six governors and an alliance representing over 41,000 businesses and 500,000 fishing families have united in their opposition to offshore oil and gas drilling and/or exploration in the Atlantic. We're Crabby About Drilling was formed in 2018 to join this organized opposition to seismic testing and offshore drilling.

== Organization ==
We're Crabby About Drilling consists of roughly 40 volunteers, most of whom are retirees with some prior experience in their various areas of responsibility. Meetings are held as needed to coordinate activities and bring members up to speed on current/expected developments.

== Activities ==
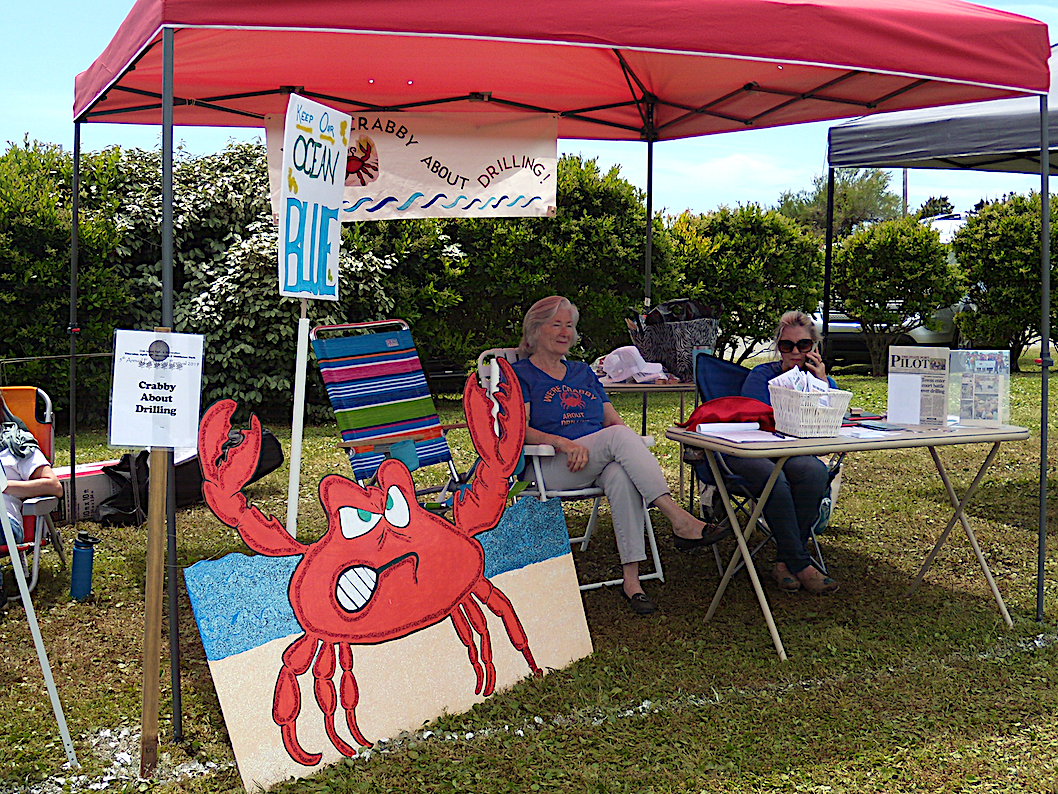
Crabby Against Drilling Booth-Earth Day 2019

The group's efforts are currently focused on Brunswick Country ocean front communities (Southport, Bald Head Island, Caswell Beach. Oak Island, Holden Beach, Ocean Isle and Sunset Beach) with a goal to have these municipalities pass resolutions opposing both seismic testing and offshore drilling and also join in as amici curiae to a lawsuit filed by the Southern Environmental Law Center and various other entities in South Carolina to prevent the BOEM from approving seismic testing. Concurrent with this activity, efforts to educate the citizenry about seismic testing and offshore drilling include manning an information booth at the annual Earth Day event and sponsoring a film screening that same month at the Oak Recreation Center focused on off-shore drilling concerns. In May 2019 the group supported the "Hands Across The Sand" event with a "get out the crowd" appeal.

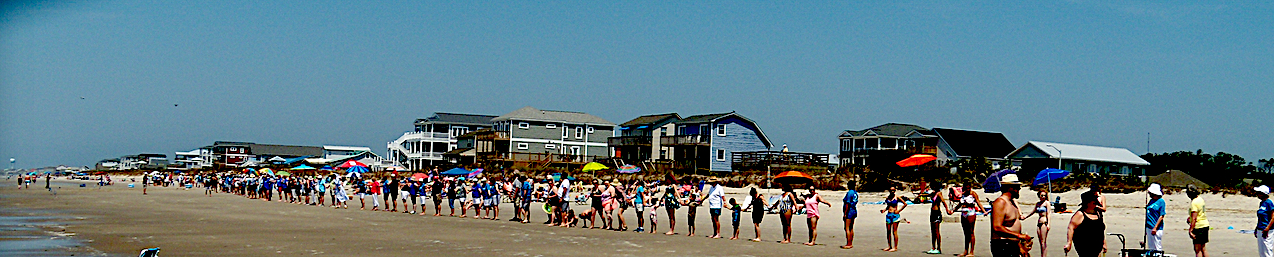
Hands Across The Sand–Oak Island NC gathering on May 18, 2019
