= Oak Island Golf Club =

Golf club in Caswell Beach, North Carolina, US

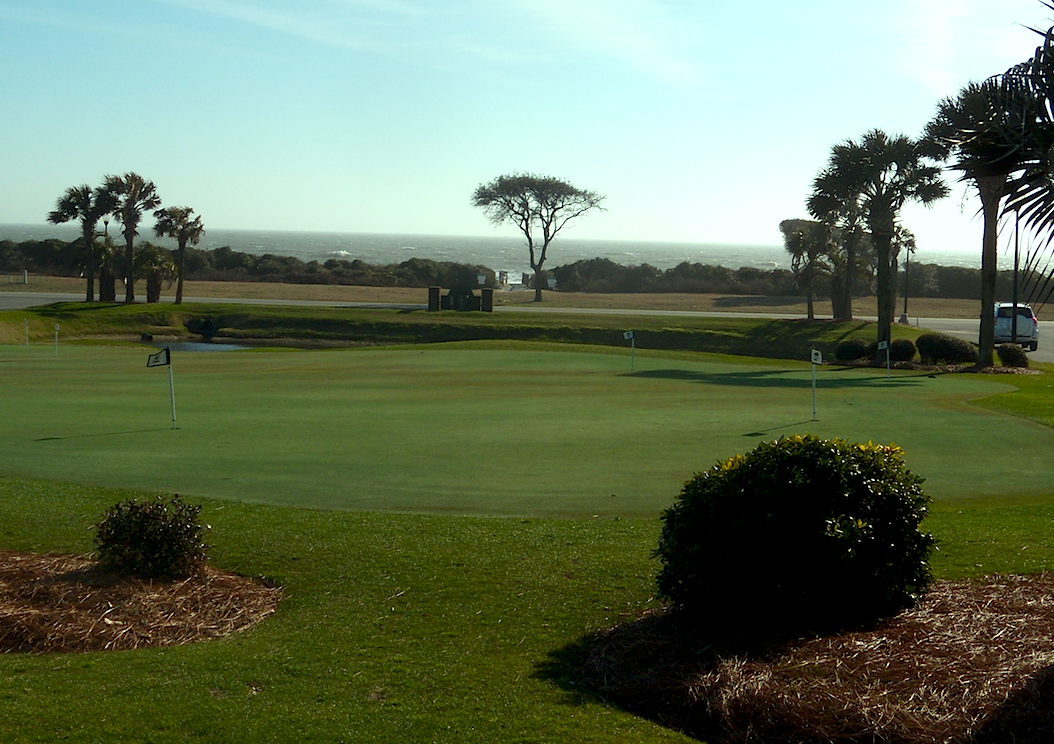
- Golf Course View of the Atlantic Ocean
- Interactive map of Oak Island Golf Club
- 33.90319°N 78.06755°W

Club information
- Location: Caswell Beach, North Carolina, United States
- Established: 1962
- Type: Private/Open to the Public
- Owner: Oak Island Golf and Country Club
- Total holes: 18
- Tournaments: Super Bowl Scramble, Superintendent’s Revenge, Southport-Oak Island Classic, Club Championship and Member-Guest
- Website: www.oakislandgolf.com
- Designed by: George Cobb
- Par: 72
- Length: 6720
- Course rating: 73.1
- Course record: 63 – Ken Green

The Oak Island Golf Club (OIGC) is a golf club located in Caswell Beach, North Carolina on the south side of Oak Island looking out at the Atlantic Ocean. Part of the Lower Cape Fear region in Brunswick County, Southeast North Carolina, it is one of the few 18 holes golf courses built on a barrier island. The privately owned 6,720 yard, par 72 course is open to the public and has 37 bunkers with water in play on 11 holes. Laid out with five sets of tees which present a wide range of playability, the back (blue) tees are course rated at 73.1 with a slope of 139. A pro shop/pub/snack bar along with a full practice facility to include a sand trap, both putting and pitching greens, and a driving range is also available to the public.

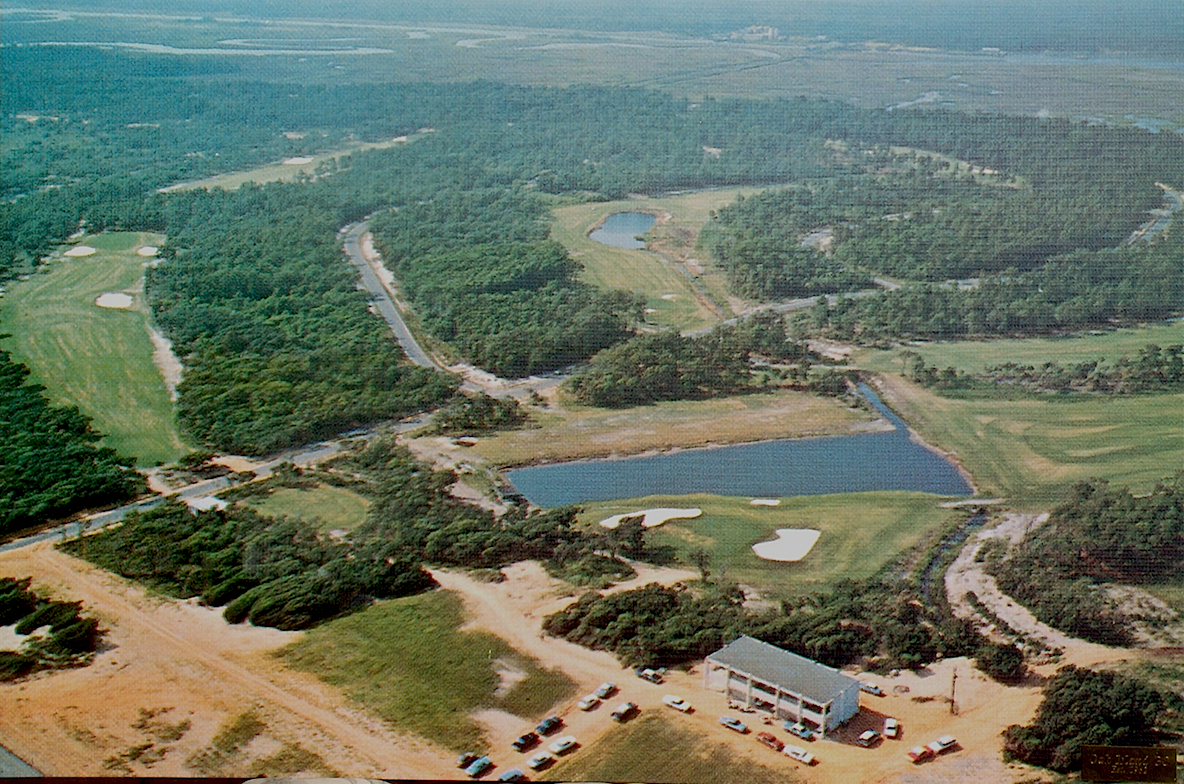
1962 Aerial View of the Golf Course under construction

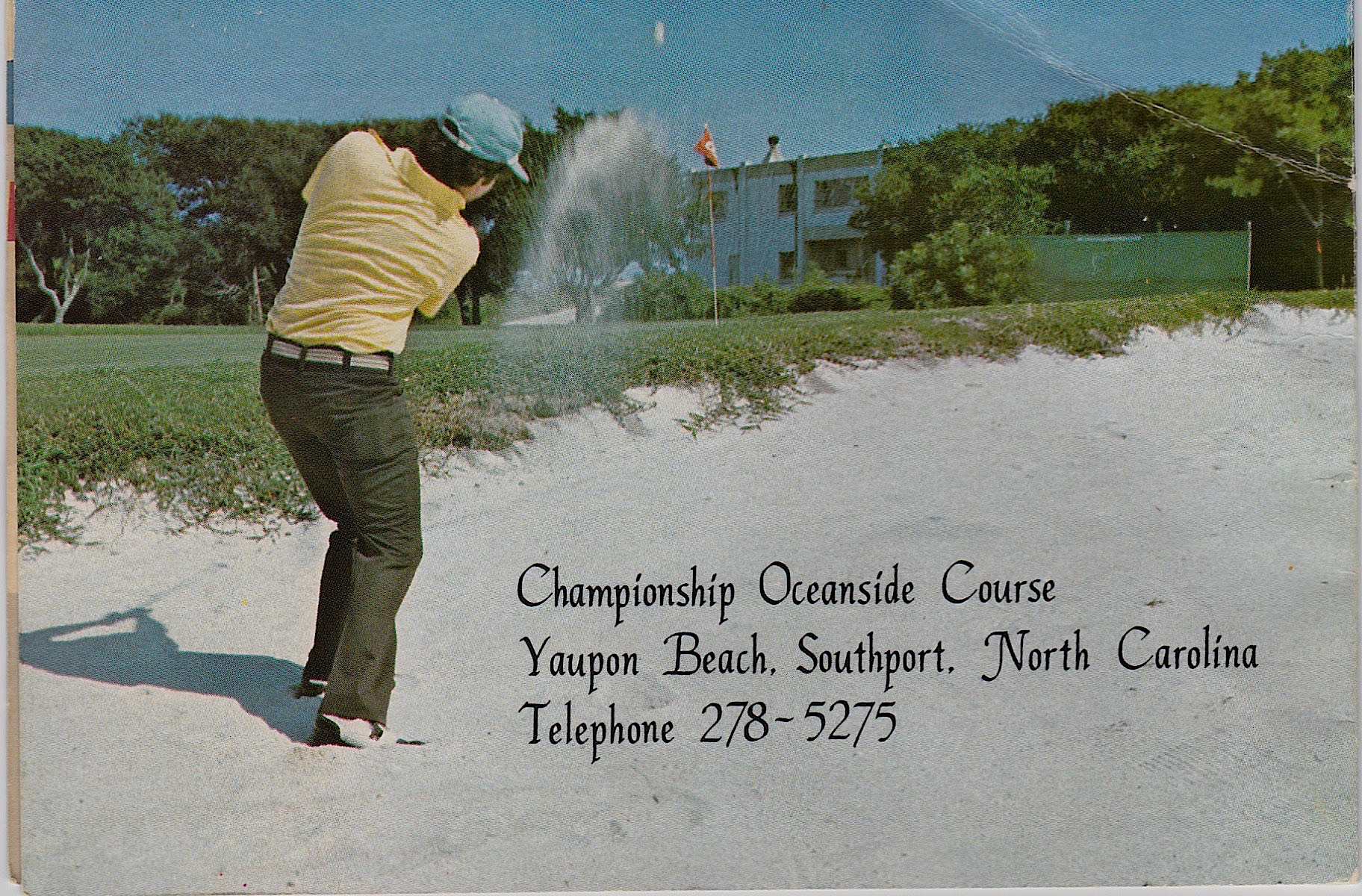
1977 OIGC Scorecard Photo of Clubhouse/18th green

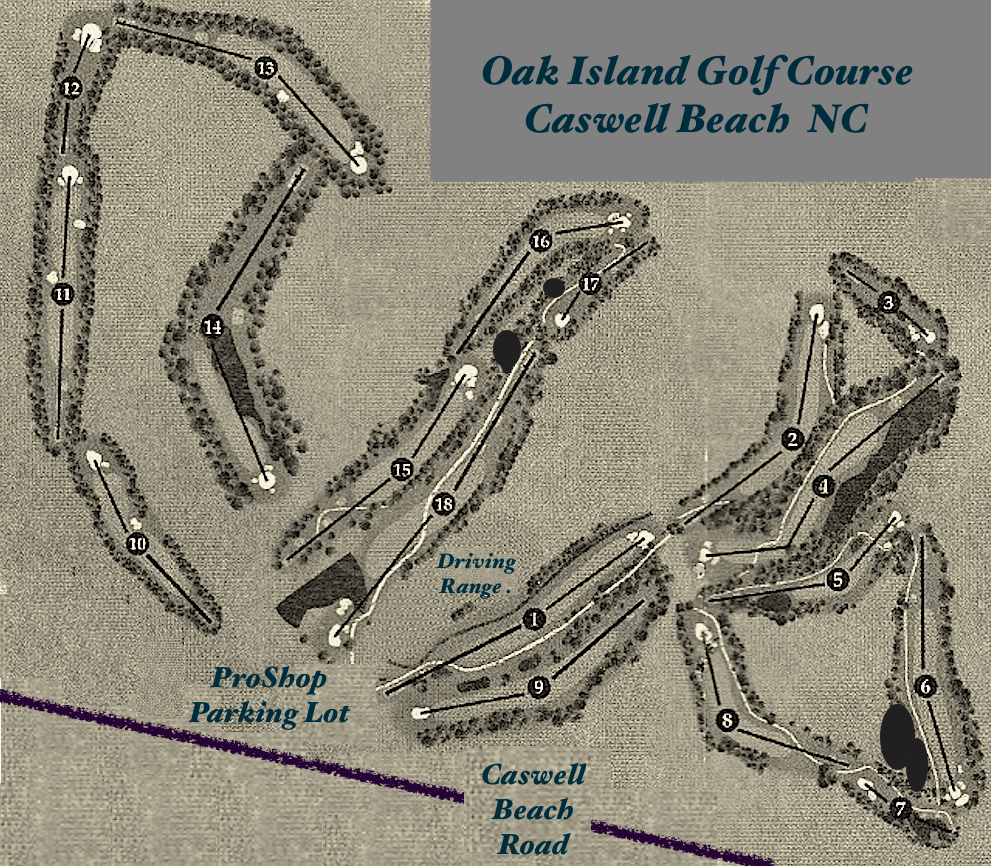
Diagram (2018) of the Oak Island Golf Course

== History ==
The first nine holes were completed in 1962 while the second nine opened to the public in 1975. The course architect, George Cobb (1914-1986), in addition to being the co-designer of Augusta National's par 3 course, is also the architect for over 100 other courses in the southeast US to include East Lake in Atlanta GA, Quail Hollow in Charlotte NC and Sea Pines in Hilton Head SC. The Oak Island layout features ultra-dwarf TifEagle greens and Bermuda tees/fairways/rough with Long Leaf Pine, Live Oak and Yaupon Holly trees bordering most every fairway. In December 2017, the original 1962 clubhouse/restaurant was torn down and a new facility built which opened in December 2019.

== Golf Events ==
Tournaments are held year round with the most popular ones being a mixed scramble event on Super Bowl Sunday, the Superintendent’s Revenge in late winter where the course is set up with no concern for the rules of golf and pin positions are unbelievably difficult, the Southport-Oak Island Classic captain's choice event sponsored by the local Chamber of Commerce in the spring which includes a "Putt for Green" competition, the annual Battle of the Beaches where all the neighboring communities compete against each other in a team event, the Club Championship in late August which also includes a senior and super-senior competition, and the weekend Member-Guest tournament in October.

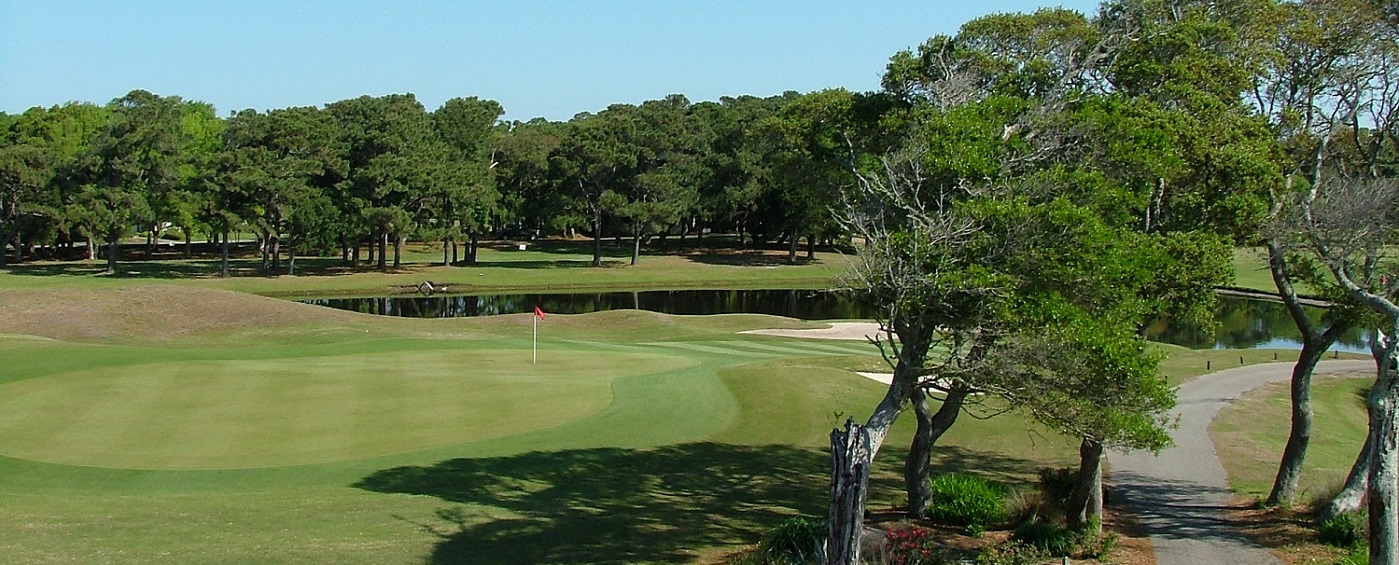
View of the Oak Island Golf Club 18th Hole looking north

== Scorecard ==
Oak Island Golf Course
Tee	Rating/Slope	1	2	3	4	5	6	7	8	9	Out	10	11	12	13	14	15	16	17	18	In	Total
Blue	73.1./139	494	412	189	560	386	409	204	355	426	3435	336	399	170	391	515	371	363	188	549	3282	6717
Black	71.7/134	476	397	165	546	371	392	188	328	415	3278	329	374	154	381	492	353	334	174	532	3123	6401
White	69.7/128	437	353	155	472	360	380	161	304	3022	321	310	361	144	371	455	342	306	159	459	2918	5940
Gold	67.2/120	421	323	147	466	347	307	155	297	325	2788	285	325	132	295	429	302	298	139	430	2635	5423
Par		5	4	3	5	4	4	3	4	4	36	4	4	3	4	5	4	4	3	5	36	72
SI		11	1	13	5	15	7	9	17	3		14	8	18	6	2	10	16	12	4
Red	69.7/125	387	321	125	421	308	283	134	262	351	2592	279	309	117	289	262	287	272	114	282	2311	4903
Par		5	4	3	5	4	4	3	4	5	37	4	4	3	4	4	4	4	3	5	35	72
SI		9	1	15	5	3	13	7	17	11		12	6	18	8	2	10	16	14	4

== Golf Associations ==
The Linksters men's group dates back to 1986 and holds monthly tournaments on Saturdays where individuals and two or four man teams compete in best ball, scramble or total score events. There is also a match play elimination tournament held during the spring/summer and a mixed couples putting contest on a Sunday afternoon in September followed by a banquet. The December monthly competition includes a post event luncheon where awards are presented, the highlight of which is the Joe O’Brien Cup (former Town Mayor) presentation to the golfer of the year.

Its counterpart, the Oak Island Women’s Golf Association (OIWGA) is an equally active group that conducts year-round weekday (Wednesday) and weekend (Saturday) morning competitions. Tournaments held during the year include the mixed couple Sadie Hawkins Day contest in March, the Member-Member team event in April and the two day Women’s Championship Stroke Play competition in September. A combined Linkster/OIGWA team event is held in October while the final event of the year in December is followed by an awards luncheon.

== Course Environs ==
Carved out of a maritime forest, the course is built through four residential communities: single family homes in Oak Island Estates bordering holes 10-16; another single family development, the Arboretum located between holes 1–2 and 16–18; the Ocean Greens mixed townhouse, condo and duplex community surrounding holes 3-7; and Caswell Dunes, a mixed condo and patio home development alongside holes 5-9.
