= Fort Caswell Rifle Range =

- Fort Caswell Rifle Range (Contributing Structure)
- U.S. National Register of Historic Places
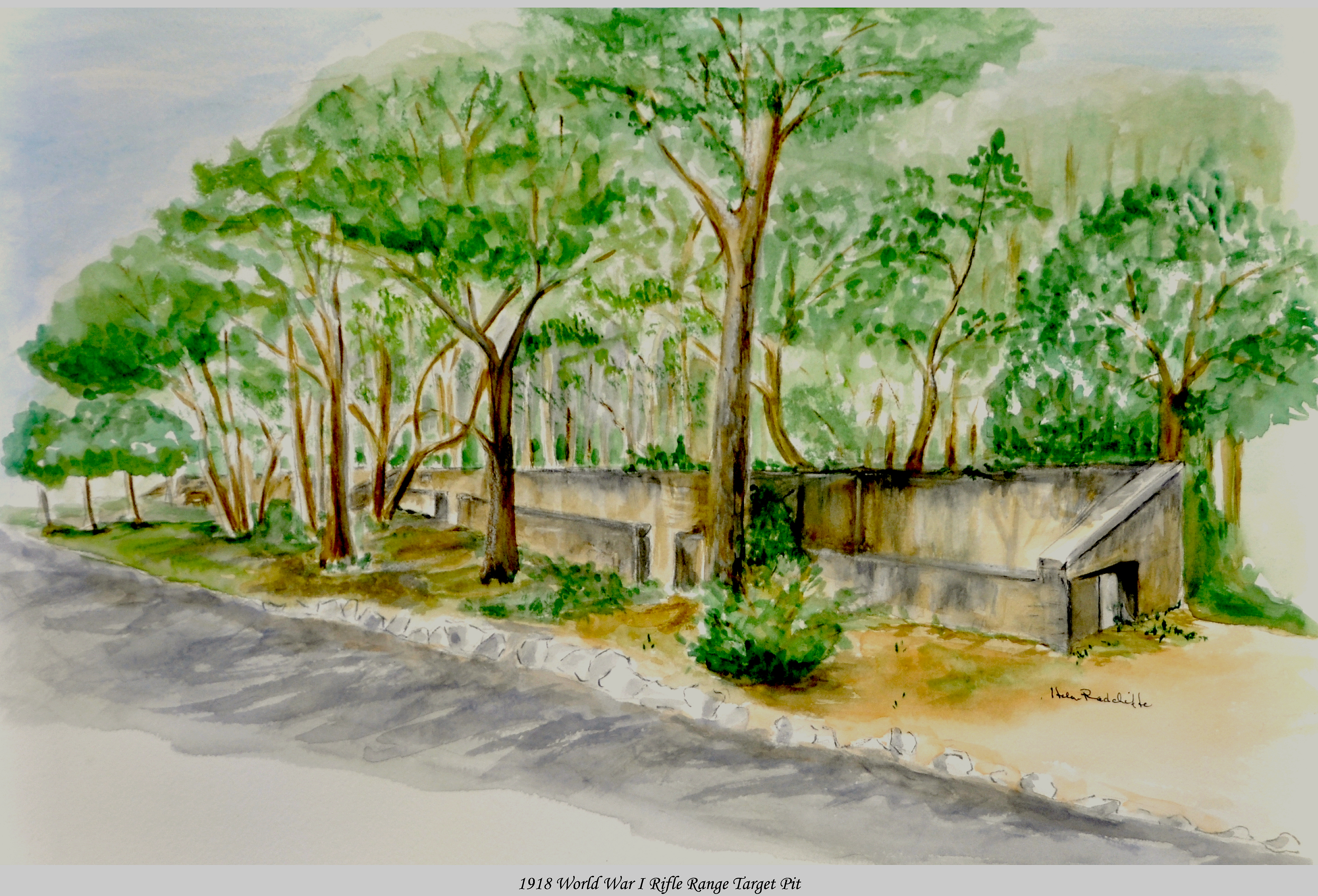
- Fort Caswell Rifle Range

- Location within North Carolina Location within the United States
- Location: Foxfire Trace, Caswell Beach, North Carolina
- Coordinates: 33°54′13″N 78°3′38″W
- NRHP reference No.: 13001025
- Added to NRHP: December 31, 2013

The Fort Caswell Rifle Range located in Caswell Beach NC, is a discontiguous part of Fort Caswell which defended Confederate positions on the North Carolina coast during the Civil War and served both as an army training ground in World War I and a patrol/ communications base in World War II. In 2013, the rifle range which was constructed during WWI, along with Fort Caswell itself, was designated as a National Register of Historic Places property.

== Location ==
A little over two miles west northwest of Fort Caswell which sits on the east end of Oak Island, the site is located in a residential section known as Caswell Dunes. Open to the public, it can be reached by turning off Caswell Beach Rd. onto Pinehurst Dr. and proceeding north for about 200 yards to Foxfire Trace.

== Construction ==
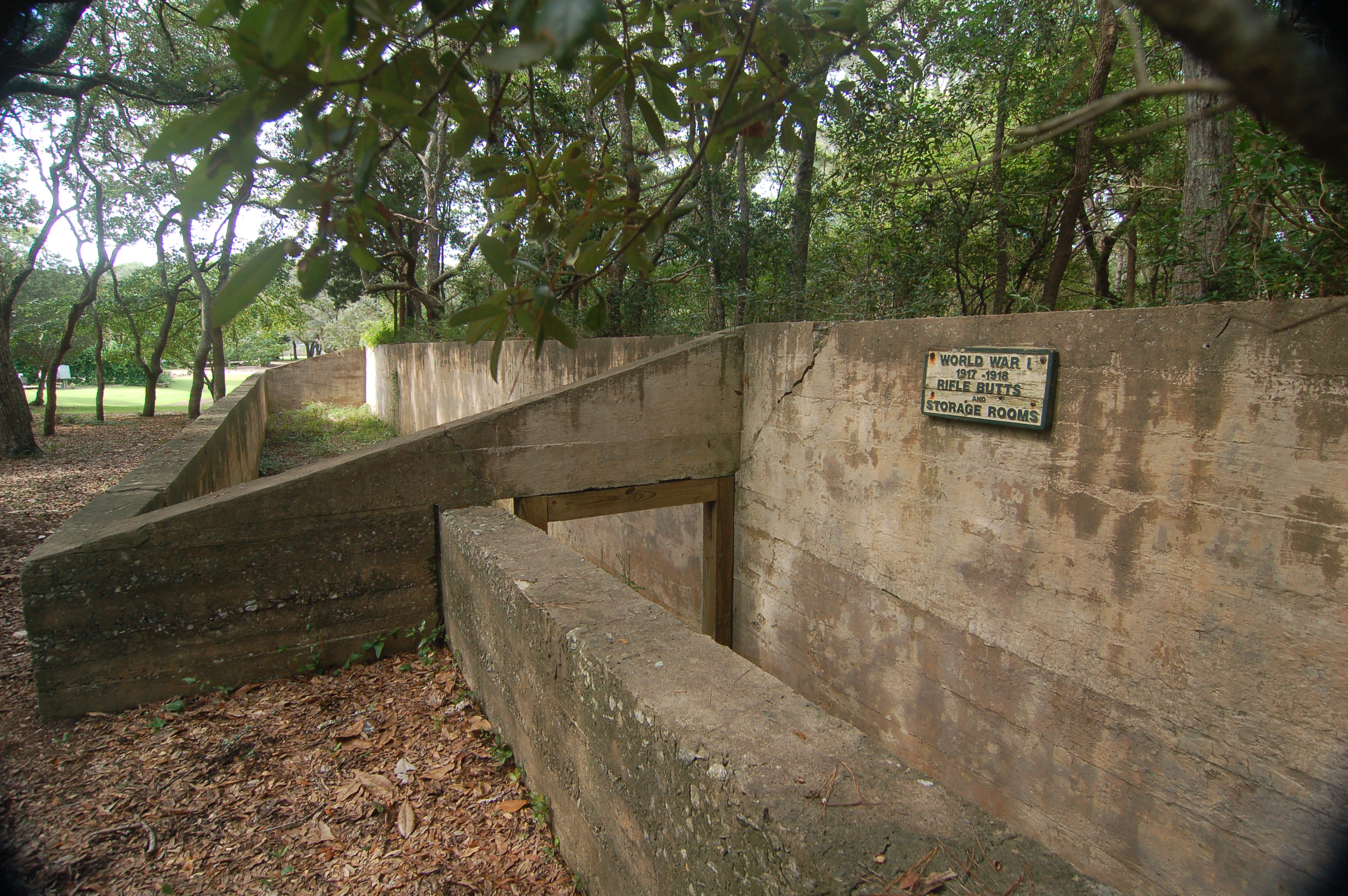
Fort Caswell Rifle Range

The structure is mostly below grade and composed of three sections of concrete walls which range from 8" to 1’ thick and in total measure 184-foot-long (56 m) in length. Sloping from north to south and open on top, the 9.5’ north wall is 3’ higher than the south wall; the structure's width varies among the three sections. The 14’ long eastern section originally had a roof and served as a storage room for target supplies and tools. It had a doorway leading to the 76’ long center section, which essentially served as a walkway between the storage room and the 94’ long target area at the western end. A door opening connects the center and western sections. "May 20th, 1918" is inscribed in the ·south wall of the middle section.

== History ==
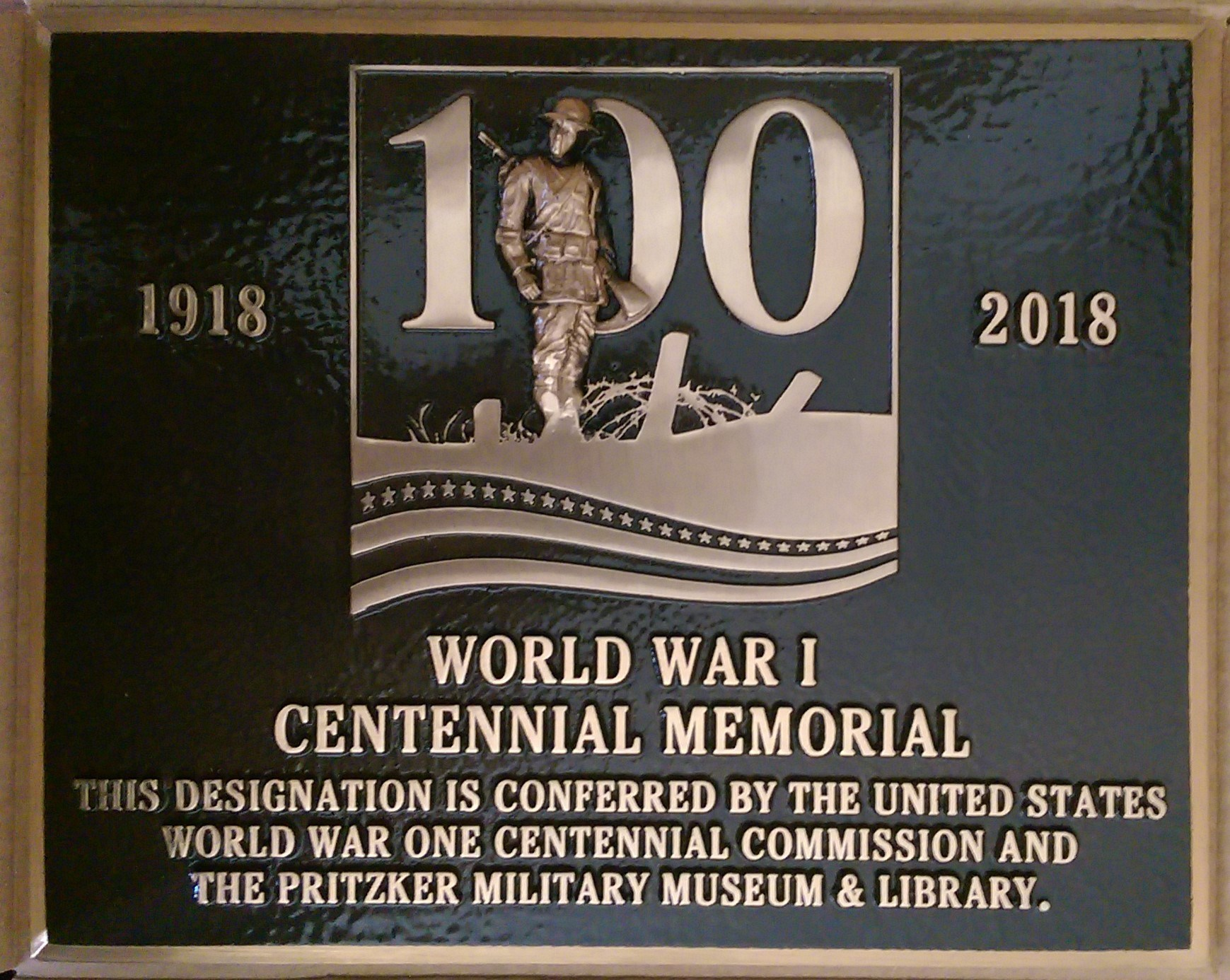
WWI Centennial Memorial Plaque

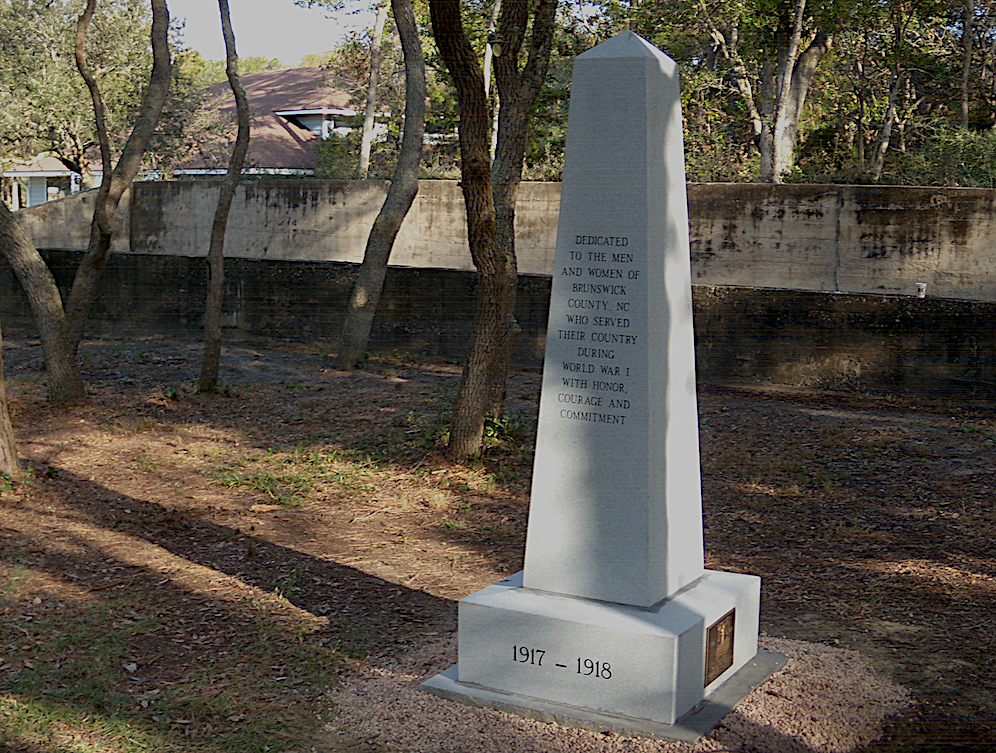
Fort Caswell Rifle Range Monument

The US War Department approved construction of the rifle range on January 21, 1918 for small arms training of soldiers. After World War II, it was declared surplus and sold, and over the years left untended, the range walls were undermined due to tree roots and water infiltration. Of special concern were the load-bearing supports across interior doorways which were cracking and separating from the walls. In 2012, work started on restoring the range, which involved among other things using contracted labor and volunteers to initially stabilize the walls. Currently, Friends of Fort Caswell Rifle Range, a non-profit formed in 2015, is carrying on this task with the full support of the Town of Caswell Beach and the Caswell Dunes Homeowners Association. On April 5, 2018, the U.S. World War I Centennial Commission and the Pritzker Military Museum and Library announced that the 1918 Fort Caswell Rifle Range was one of the one hundred WWI memorials chosen for a restoration grant and honored with the official national designation as "WWI Centennial Memorial". And then on November 11, 2018, the 100th Anniversary of the WWI Armistice Day, the Brunswick County WWI Monument recently erected on site, was dedicated to commemorate the veterans who fought in the war. In addition to managing the facility, in 2020 the Friends of Fort Caswell Rifle Range arranged to publish Brunswick County in the Great War Containing biographic sketches of all known Brunswick County NC WWI service members, the book features a 25 page introductory section with photos and diagrams along with text about the Caswell Beach rifle pits that chronicles its history.
