= Frying Pan Shoals =

Shoals off the coast of North Carolina, United States

Coordinates: 33°48′04″N 77°56′49″W

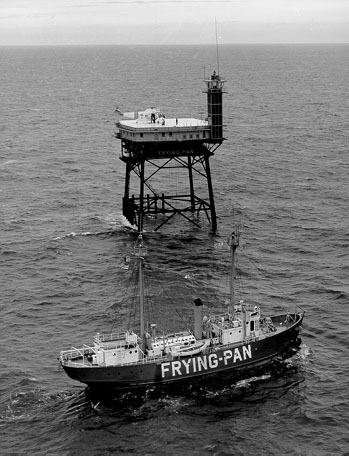
Frying Pan lightship and light tower

The Frying Pan Shoals are a shifting area of shoals off Cape Fear in North Carolina, United States. Formed by silt from the Cape Fear River, the shoals are over 28 miles (45 km) long and resemble a frying pan in shape. They provide fishing.

The shoals are known for the high number of shipwrecks found in the region and are deemed part of the Graveyard of the Atlantic. From May 1994 to August 2008 over 130 new shipwreck locations were discovered in the area. Known since the beginning of European exploration, the shoals were marked on a map in 1738. The southern edge of the shoals has been marked by nine lightships including the Frying Pan, a light tower, and a weather buoy. The Bald Head Light, the Cape Fear Lighthouse and the Oak Island lighthouse have also provided warning to mariners.
