= Caswell Beach, North Carolina =

- Town
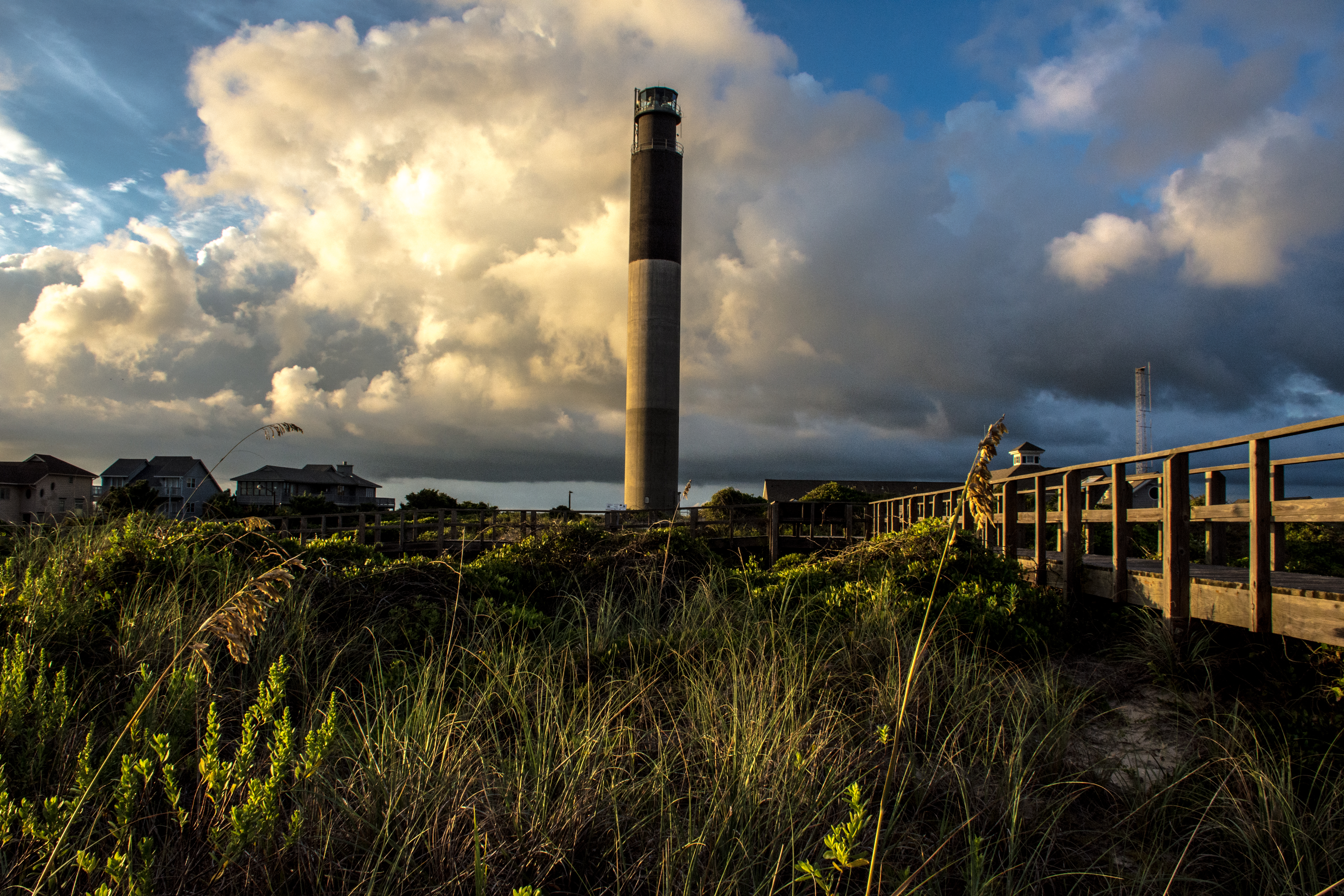
- Caswell Beach–Oak Island Lighthouse

- Seal
- Motto: The Best Little Beach Town in America
- Location within the state of North Carolina
- Coordinates: 33°54′27″N 78°02′50″W
- Country: United States
- State: North Carolina
- County: Brunswick
- Incorporated: 1975

Area
  - Total: 4.10 sq mi (10.62 km^{2})
  - Land: 2.97 sq mi (7.69 km^{2})
  - Water: 1.13 sq mi (2.93 km^{2})
- Elevation: 0 ft (0 m)

Population (2020)
  - Total: 395
  - Density: 133.0/sq mi (51.37/km^{2})
- Time zone: UTC-5 (Eastern (EST))
  - Summer (DST): UTC-4 (EDT)
- ZIP code: 28465
- Area codes: 910, 472
- FIPS code: 37-10960
- GNIS feature ID: 2406237
- Website: www.caswellbeach.org

Caswell Beach is a small seaside town located on the Atlantic Ocean at the mouth of the Cape Fear River in Southeastern North Carolina, United States. Occupying the eastern part of Oak Island in Brunswick County, its population was listed at 395 in the 2020 census. Prominent features include the Civil War era Fort Caswell, the Oak Island Lighthouse co-located with the Oak Island Coast Guard Station, and the Oak Island Golf Club, the sole business in town and one of the few eighteen-hole courses located on a North Carolina barrier island. Along with the Town of Oak Island which occupies the central and west parts of the island, Caswell Beach is part of the Wilmington, NC Metropolitan Statistical Area.

== History ==
Contiguous to Fort Caswell which dates from 1825, Caswell Beach was incorporated as a town in 1975; both were named for Richard Caswell, 1st & 5th Governor of North Carolina. The fort which is located on the extreme eastern end of Oak Island now houses the North Carolina Baptist Assembly, a Christian retreat and conference center and in 2013 it was designated a National Historic District. Also on the east end of town, the Oak Island Lighthouse which became operational in 1958 was acquired by the town in 2004 after extensive negotiations with the National Park Service. In 1975, the same year the town was incorporated, all 18 holes of the Oak Island Golf Club on the west end of town were first opened for play.

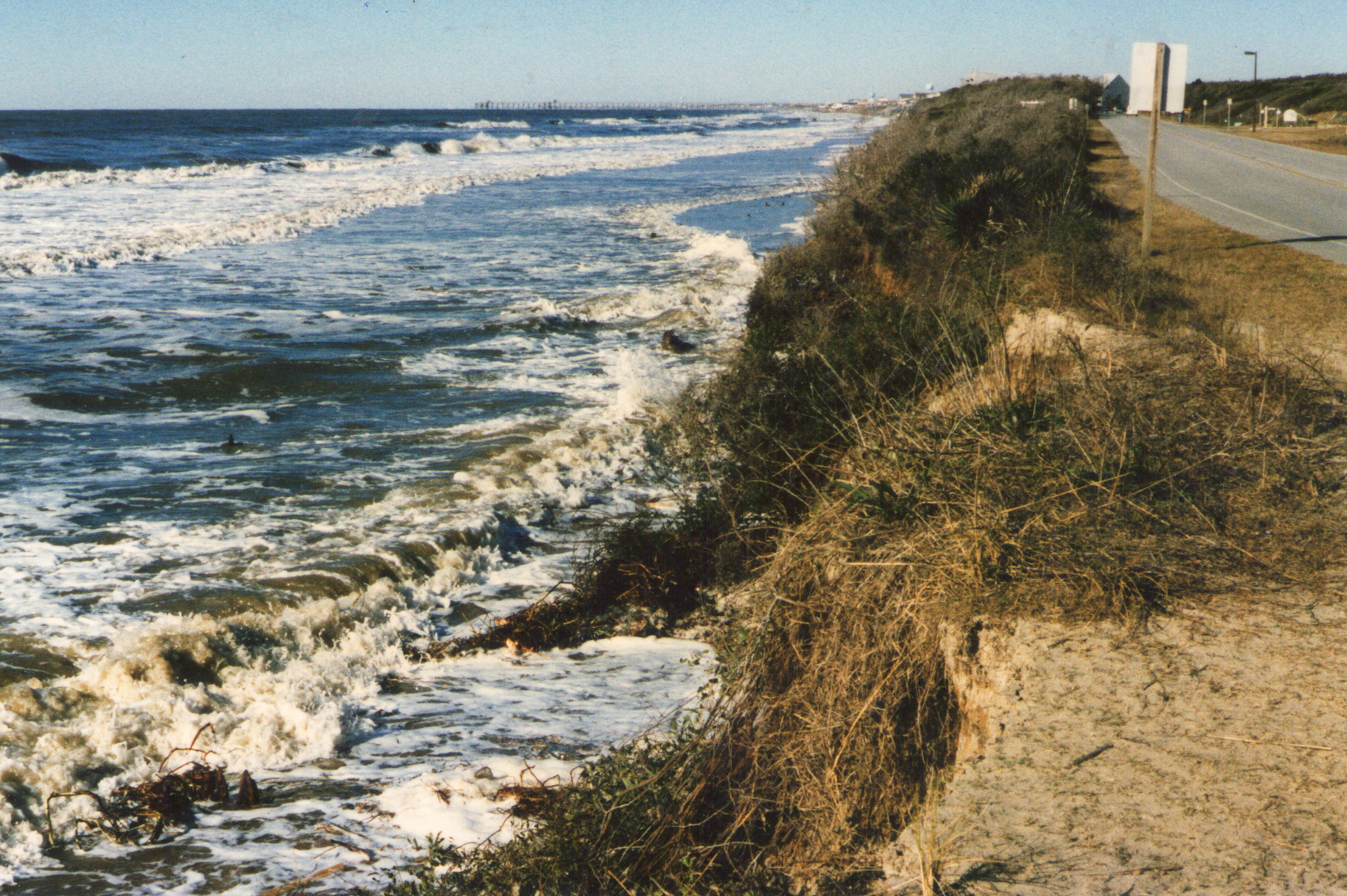
Beach Erosion–1998

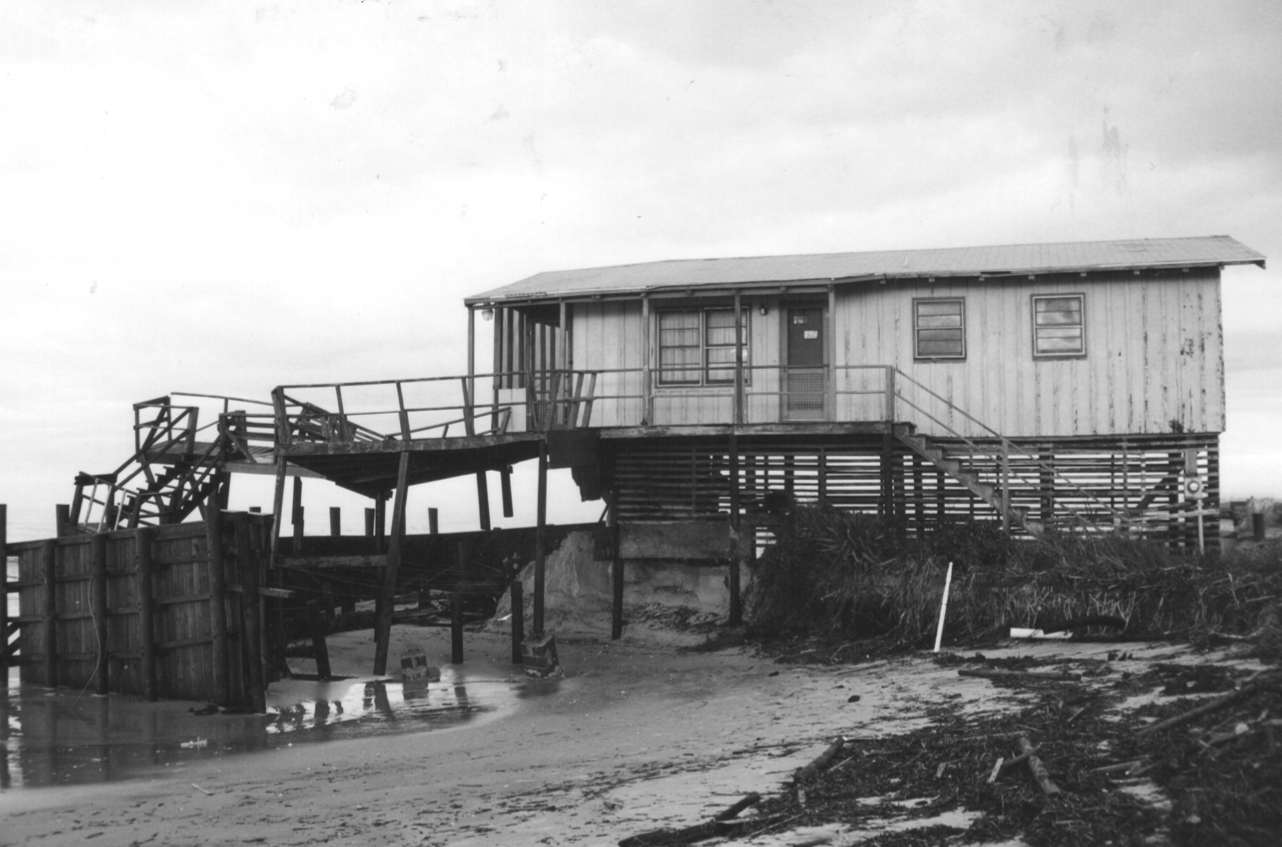
Beachfront property after 1998 Nor'easter

Caswell Beach slowly developed into a vacation resort community, but was plagued over the years by the incessant erosion of beach sand due to hurricanes and northeasters. This erosion threatened the town's main thoroughfare (Caswell Beach Rd) and made uninhabitable many ocean front houses. Installation of roadside sandbags provided temporary relief and its success prompted the town to set in motion an intensive restoration and preservation effort focused on installing sand fences and planting sea oats/beach grass. This work was abetted by the Wilmington Harbor Channel Project, which dumped huge amounts of sand on the beach as a least cost disposal option. This effort was very successful and widely recognized as the town received a national award in 2002 for Best Restored Beach.

== Geography ==
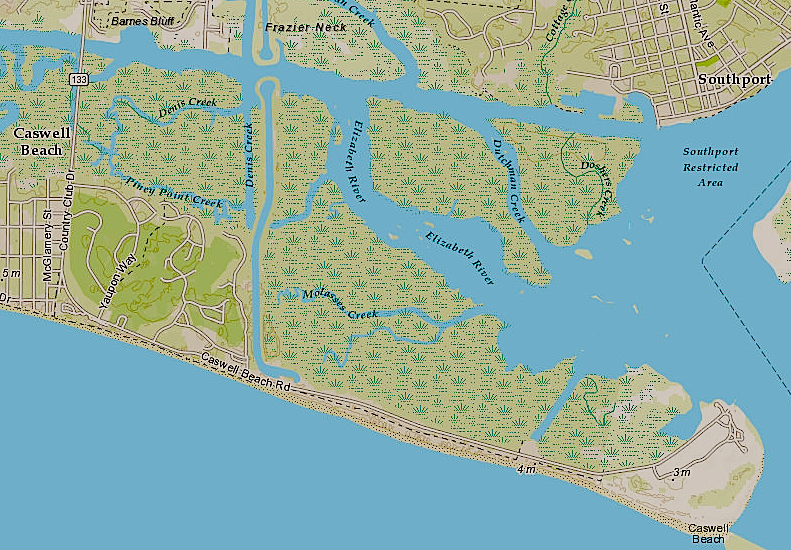
Caswell Beach NC Map

Roughly halfway distant from Wilmington, North Carolina and Myrtle Beach, South Carolina, Caswell Beach is located on the east end of Oak Island. This island is the easternmost of the South Brunswick Islands which were formed in the late 1930s by the construction of the Intracoastal Waterway (ICW) which was dredged from Southport, NC at the mouth of the Cape Fear River through coastal sounds and marshes to the Little River in South Carolina. Elevations in the town range from sea level to approximately 25'while the town has a total area of 4.1 square miles (10.5 km^{2}), of which 2.9 square miles (7.6 km^{2}) is land.

=== Climate ===
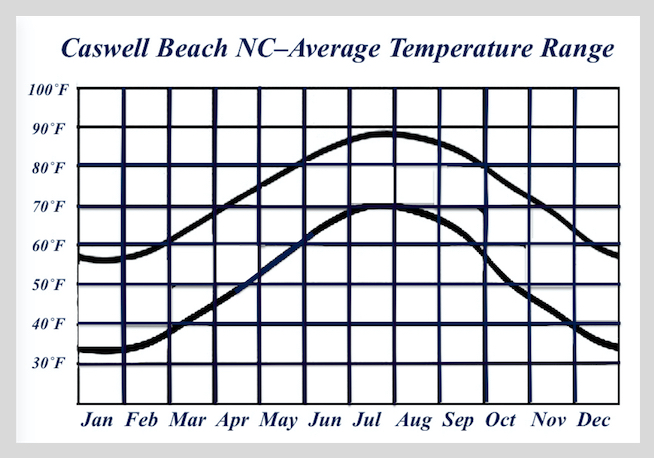
Caswell Beach NC-Average Temperature Range

Summers in Caswell Beach are hot and humid with an average temperature of 85˚, although the beach front is cooled much of the time by sea breezes (the prevailing winds are from the southwest). Winters are moderate with an average temperature in the 50s (°F), albeit with brief cold periods. Rain occurs throughout the year with average annual rainfall approximately 57", 45% of this falling between June and September.

Tropical storms are a continuing source of concern, e.g., in October 1954, Hurricane Hazel washed away almost all the houses on Oak Island. A threat in late summer/early fall, the 1996-1999 period was intense with four major hurricanes (Bertha, Fran, Bonnie, and Floyd) making landfall and having significant effects on the area, while in the fall of 2005, Hurricane Ophelia and Tropical Storm Tammy combined to cause flooding in low-lying areas. More recently, in October 2016, the eye of Hurricane Matthew passed almost directly over the town, inflicting extensive damage to the dune system, and in September 2018, Hurricane Florence caused severe flooding and wind damage in addition to washing away most of the beach sand added earlier in the year.

== Demographics ==
Historical population
| Census | Pop. | Note | %± |
|---|---|---|---|
| 1980 | 110 | | — |
| 1990 | 175 | | 59.1% |
| 2000 | 370 | | 111.4% |
| 2010 | 398 | | 7.6% |
| 2020 | 395 | | −0.8% |

The 395 people identified in the 2020 census reside in some 190 permanent households (overall there were 681 housing units in Caswell Beach at the time of the census). This population is essentially all white, fairly elderly (median age 63) with more women (55%) than men (45%). Median household income is $74,219. None of the population or families were below the poverty line. While the number of full-time residents is fairly small, in the summer peak population reaches 2,000, mostly family vacationers using rental properties.

== Housing ==
Large single family homes, many of which serve as vacation rental properties, can be found along the beach strand at the east end of town, while on the west end, the ocean-front Oak Island Beach Villas feature condo rental units. Most of the full-time residents live clustered in and around the golf course in various types of housing: the Arboretum (single family homes) Caswell Dunes (patio homes and condo units), and Ocean Greens (single family, duplexes, townhouses, and luxury condos).

== Government ==
The town government operates under a council-manager type system where various officials have authority to make decisions on services, revenues and expenditures in accordance with a state issued charter. The Governing Body consists of six members (the Mayor who votes only in case of a tie and five Commissioners) all of whom are elected for four year terms on a two-year rotational schedule. Town Hall is located in the west end of town next to the newly constructed Public Services Facility, which houses the Caswell Beach Police and Public Works Departments along with units of the Southport Fire Department and Brunswick County EMS.

== Attractions ==
Beach. In way of combating erosion rates ranging from 2-5' per year, the town's three mile long, south facing beach has been re-nourished three times in the past 17 years as part of the Wilmington Harbor Channel dredging project. The beach also serves as a sea turtle nesting area, which has spurred a vigorous dune protection and restoration program featuring sea oats/beach grass plantings. This program not only benefits turtle nesting but protects the town against hurricane storm surge damage. As for public access to the beach, the town maintains a free parking lot and 12 walkways spread out along the strand, most of which have wheelchair ramps.

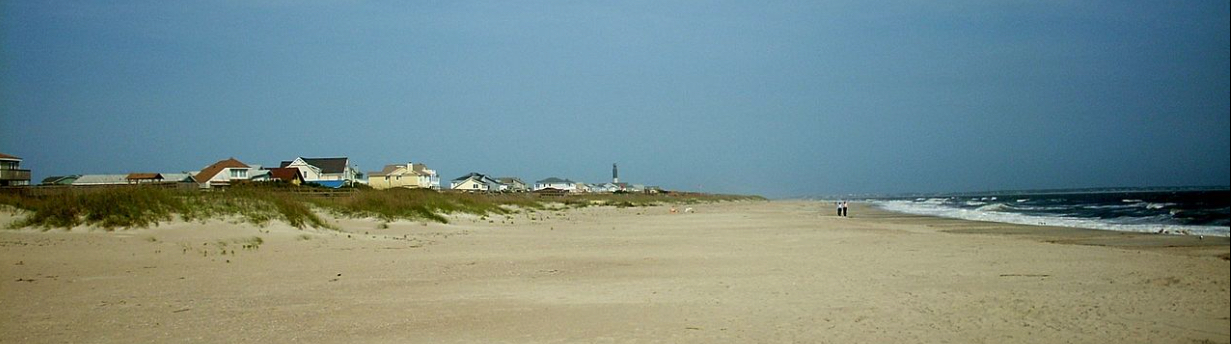
Panoramic view of Caswell Beach in 2011 looking east with the Oak Island Lighthouse in the background

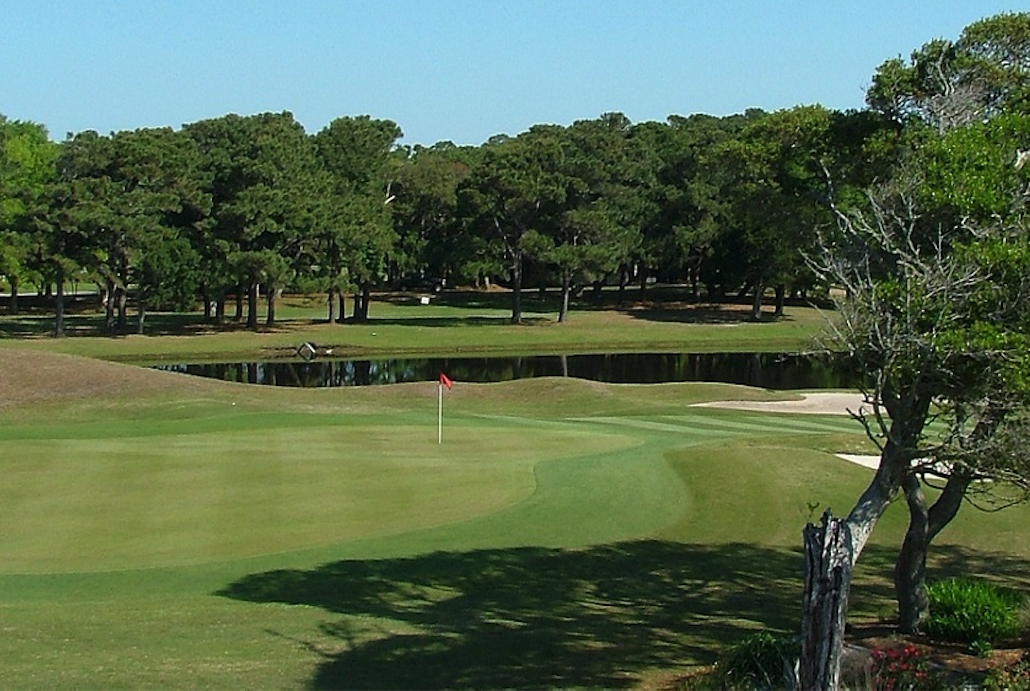
View looking north at the OIGC 18th green

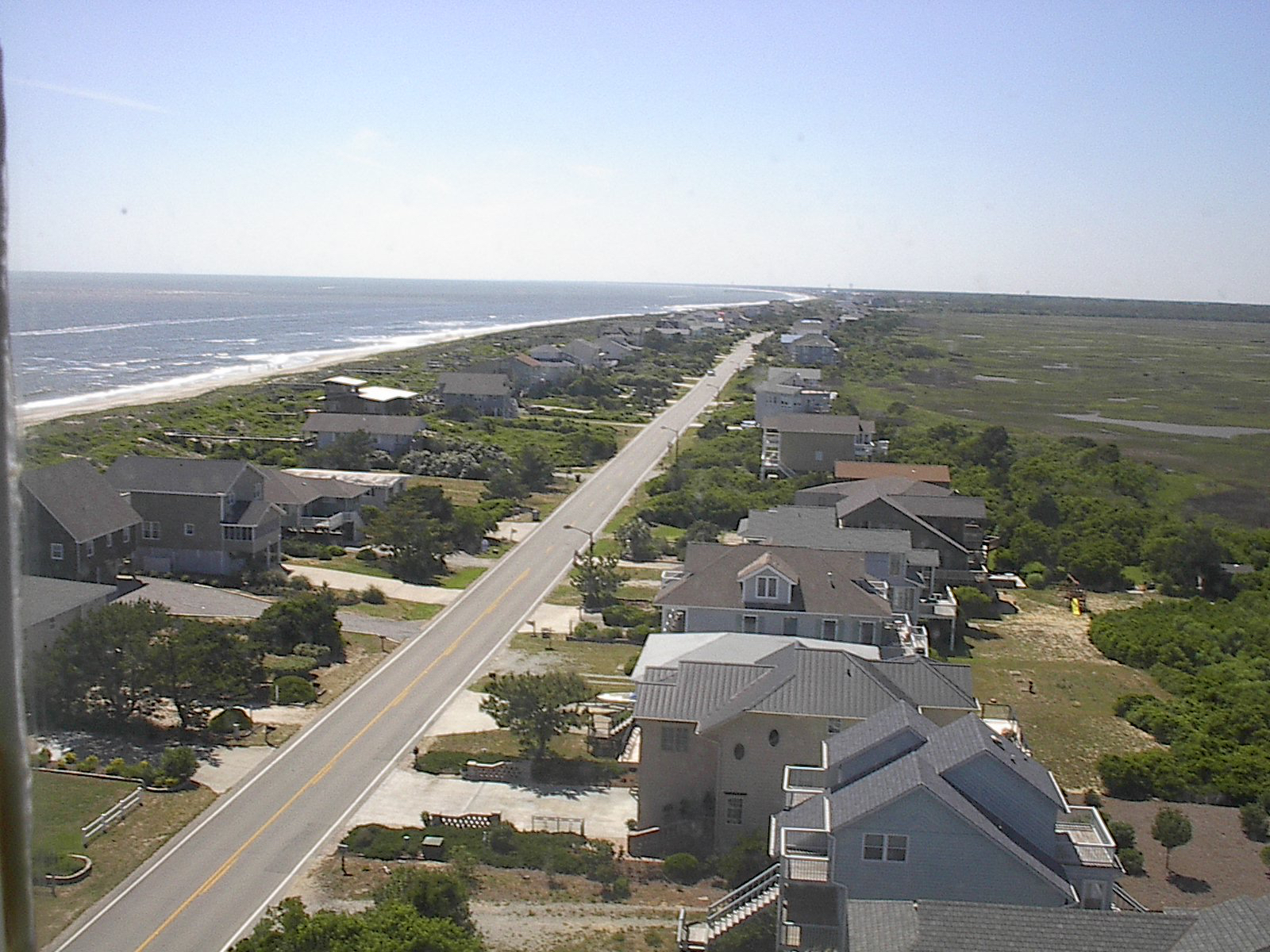
View from the Oak Island Lighthouse looking west

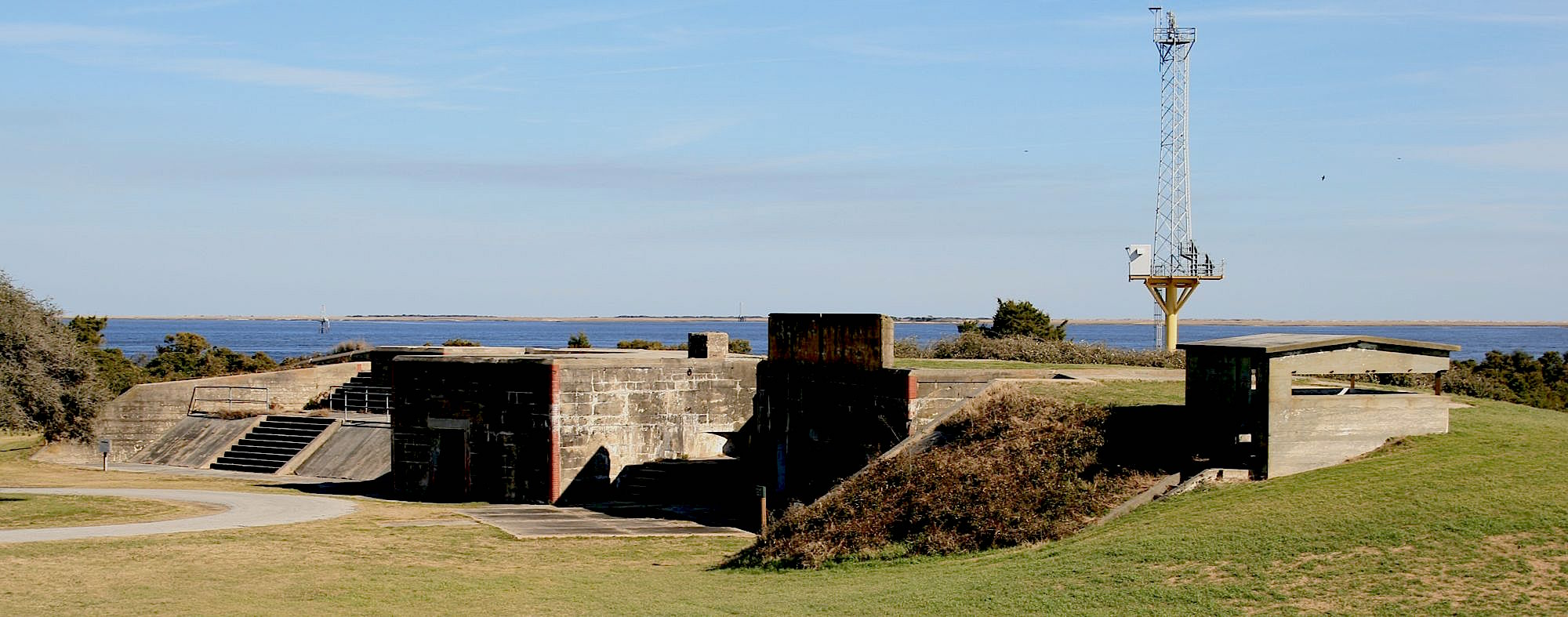
Fort Caswell (Batteries McKavett and McDonough)

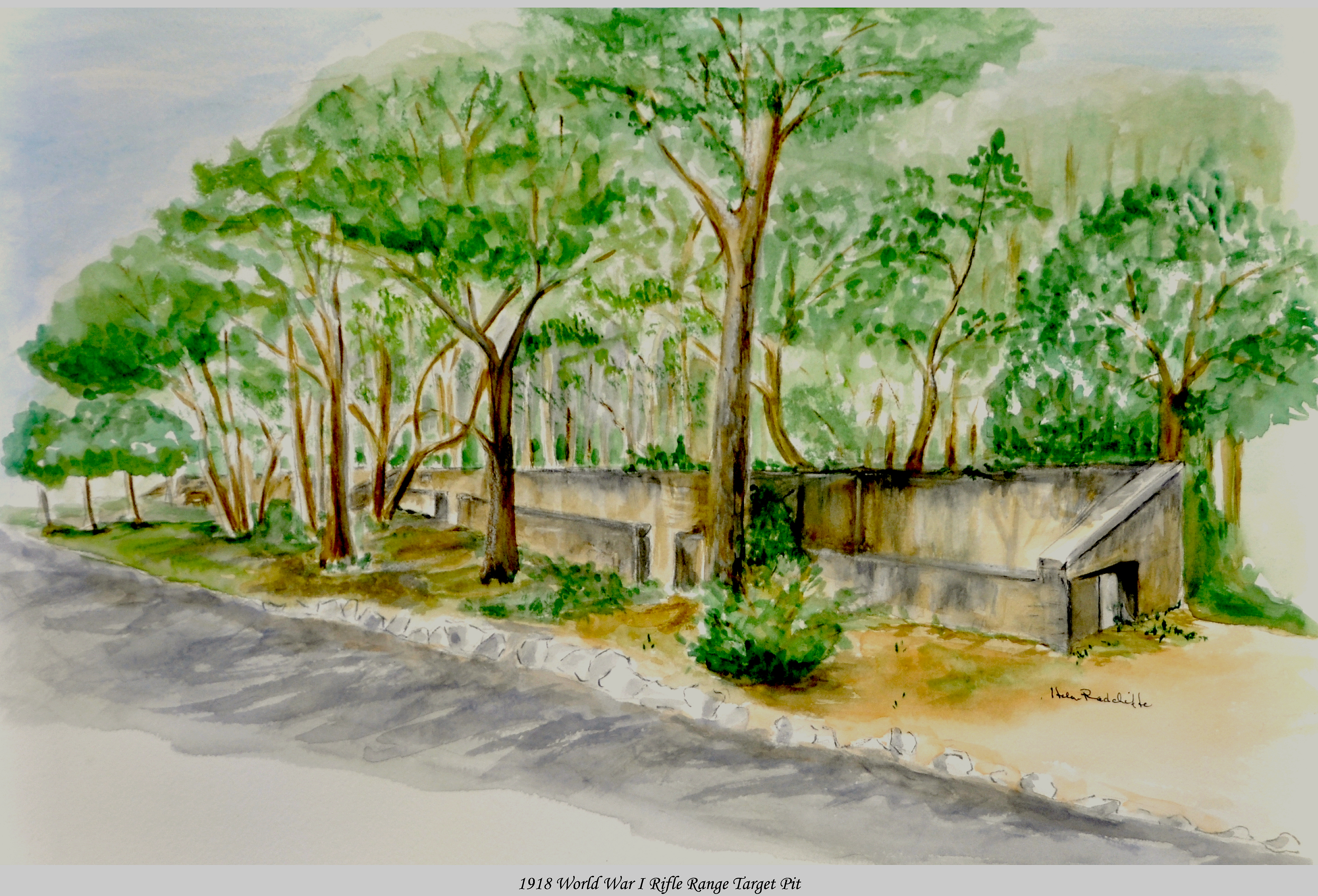
Caswell Dunes Rifle Pits

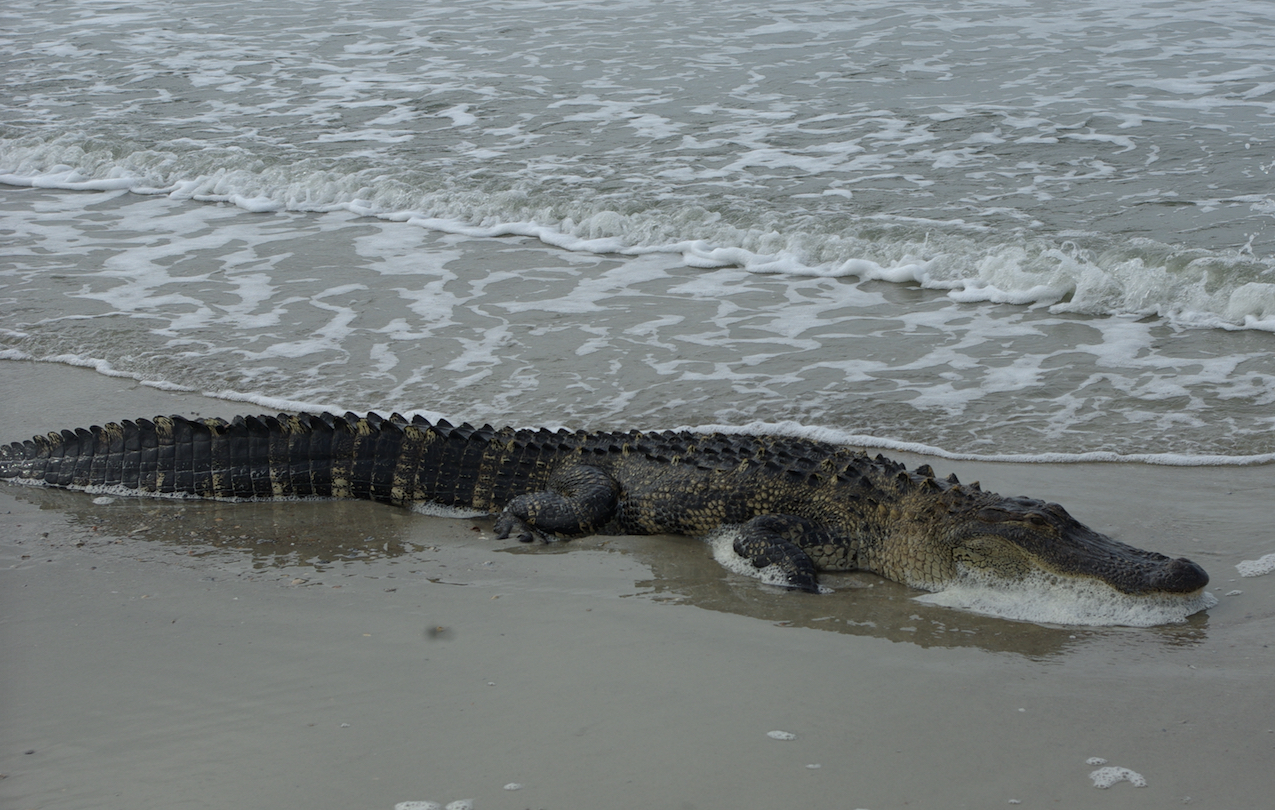
Intrepid alligator enjoying the surf

Golf Course. The 18 hole, par 72 course at the Oak Island Golf Club is open to the public. The 6,720 yard course layout has 37 bunkers and water in play on 11 different holes with five sets of tees (back tees are course rated at 73.1 with a slope of 139). The course features ultradwarf TifEagle greens and Bermuda tees/fairways/rough while Long Leaf Pines, Live Oaks and Yaupon Holly trees border most every fairway. George Cobb, co-designer of Augusta National's par 3 course, is the architect. A full practice facility is available to the public which includes a putting green, sand traps and a driving range.

Lighthouse. The Oak Island Lighthouse grounds are open to the public year-round for viewing and picture taking, with limited 30 minute parking provided at the base of the tower from sunrise until sunset. During the summer months, two types of interior tours are available (the one to the top is by appointment only). The light is maintained by personnel housed at the adjacent Coast Guard Station, while the structure itself is cared for and managed by a citizens group, Friends of Oak Island Lighthouse (FOIL). A major exterior rehabilitation project was completed in 2016, notable in that it was funded entirely by contributions. Located across the street slightly to the east of the lighthouse is the historic Oak Island Life Saving Station.

Fort Caswell Fort Caswell is accessible by the public to a limited extent per the conditions set forth by the Director, North Carolina Baptist Assembly. Now utilized as a Christian retreat and conference center, during the Civil War it defended Confederate positions on the North Carolina coast. Subsequently, it served as an army training ground in World War I and as a patrol communications base in World War II. Thus its forts and batteries provide opportunities to view and connect with a significant part of US history. Also a part of the Fort Caswell Historic District but located further west in the Caswell Dunes area is the Fort Caswell Rifle Range used by WW I soldiers for target practice. Brunswick County in the Great War published in 2020 contains a 25-page section with numerous rifle pit photos and diagrams along with biographic sketches of all known Brunswick County NC WW I service members.

Natural Habitat. Given its small population and remote location, much of the town's charm rests with its salt and fresh water marshes and a maritime forest, all of which support a wide range of plant and animal life. Alligators, turtles, foxes, deer, raccoons, beavers, eagles, brown pelicans, great white and blue herons, and ibis abound, while an occasional bear has been known to swim across the Intracoastal Waterway to visit the town. As for plant diversity, live oak, longleaf pine and Yaupon Holly predominate in the forest, while Azaleas, American Beautyberry and Sweet Bay Magnolia thrive both in natural and landscaped areas.

== Neighboring communities ==
Oak Island. The Town of Oak Island, which occupies the rest of the island, has a contract post office, a branch of the county library, supermarkets, liquor store, two fishing piers a few gas stations, numerous small professional offices/retail stores, and a large number of restaurants.

Southport. Located just across the ICW is the city of Southport (pop. 3,700). Founded as Smithville in 1792, it is home to the NC Fourth of July Festival and has been the location for many movies, one of the more notable being Safe Haven (2013). The part of town known as "Old Southport" has many historic houses and buildings, e.g. Fort Johnston, and situated on its waterfront is the North Carolina Maritime Museum at Southport and year-round ferry service that provides scenic trips across the Cape Fear River to the NC Aquarium and Civil War battleground site at Fort Fisher.

| Preceded by Fort Caswell | Beaches of Southeastern North Carolina | Succeeded by Oak Island |
