= Oak Island Light =

Lighthouse in Caswell Beach, North Carolina, US

Oak Island Light Oak Island Light
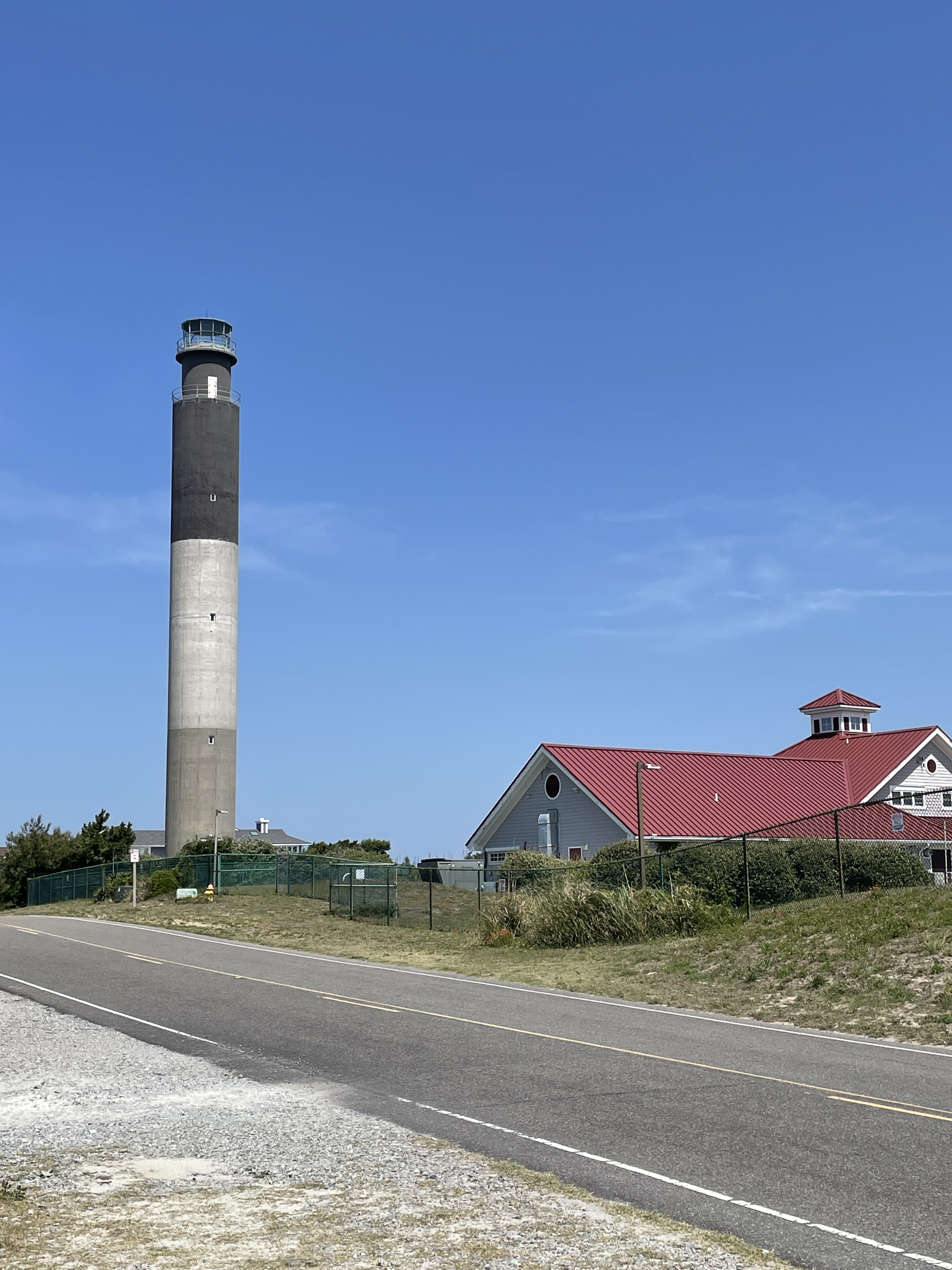
- Location: Oak Island, Cape Fear River, North Carolina
- Coordinates: 33.8929°N 78.035°W

Tower
- Constructed: 1957/8
- Foundation: Concrete-filled steel pilings
- Construction: Portland concrete
- Height: 153 feet (47 m)
- Shape: Cylindrical
- Markings: Bottom third of tower gray, second third white, top third black
- Heritage: National Register of Historic Places listed place

Light
- First lit: 1958
- Focal height: 169 feet (52 m)
- Light source: LED
- Range: 20.5 nautical miles (nominal)
- Characteristic: Fl (4)W 10s
- Oak Island Lighthouse
- U.S. National Register of Historic Places
- Area: 5.7 acres (2.3 ha)
- NRHP reference No.: 07000293
- Added to NRHP: April 5, 2007

The Oak Island Lighthouse is located in the Town of Caswell Beach near the mouth of the Cape Fear River in Southeastern North Carolina. It sits next to the Oak Island Coast Guard Station on the east end of Oak Island in Brunswick County looking south out at the Atlantic Ocean. Featuring 16 LED lights which produce four, one-second bursts of light every 10 seconds, it has a luminous range of 20.5 nautical miles. Owned by the town since 2004, it is managed by a citizens group (Friends of Oak Island Lighthouse).

== History ==
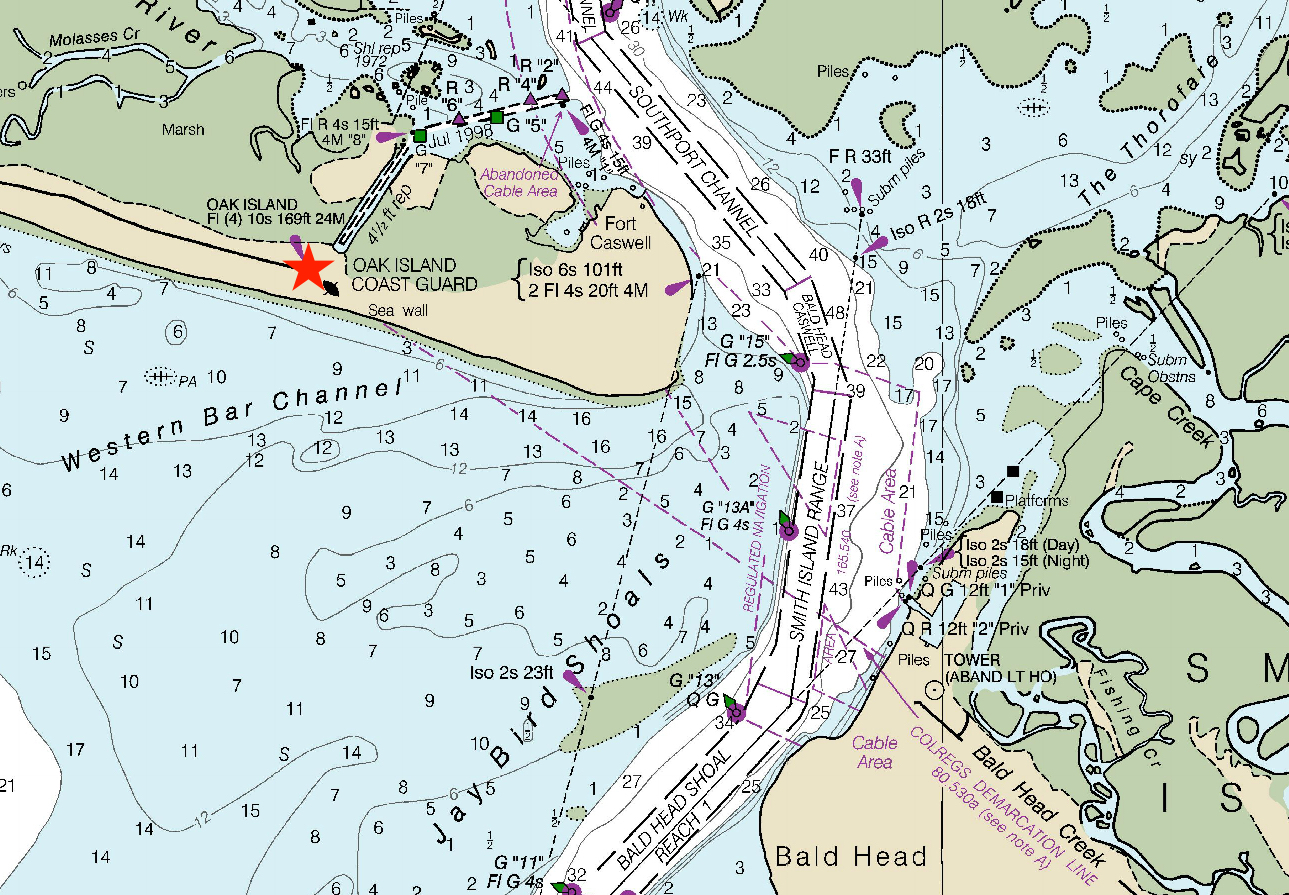
NOS Nautical Chart 11537–April 2013

In May 1958, the Oak Island Lighthouse replaced the Cape Fear Light, a steel skeleton structure on Bald Head Island which was demolished that same year. The Cape Fear Light began operation in 1903 and was then a functional replacement for the still standing and now popular tourist attraction, the 1817 Bald Head Light (Old Baldy). During the period 1958–1962, the Oak Island Light was the brightest in the US (the Charleston Light in South Carolina now holds that distinction).

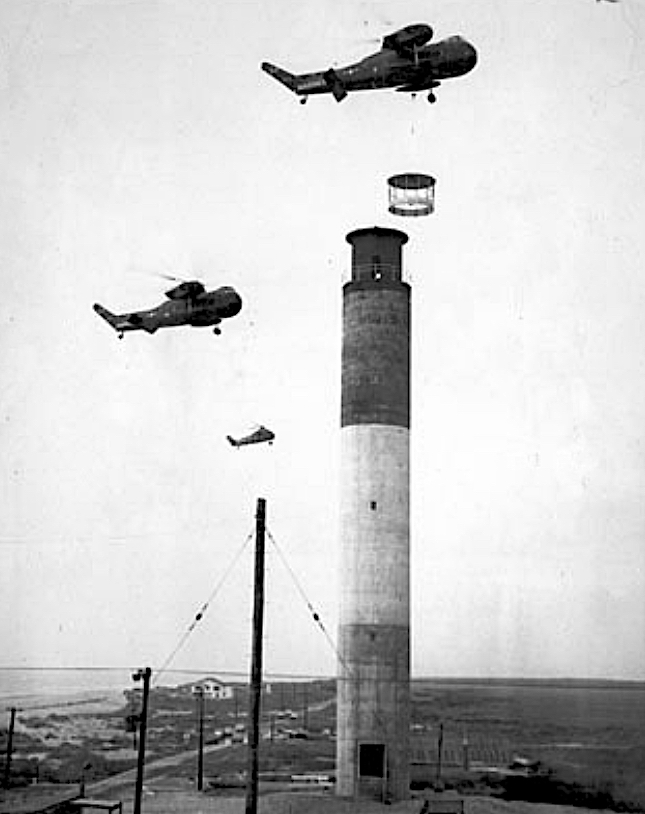
1958-Marine Corps helicopters lifting lantern atop the lighthouse

In February 2002, it became a news item when the adjoining USCG Station caught fire, and while the station burned to the ground, the lighthouse suffered no damage. Rebuilt over the existing foundation, the current Coast Guard station closely resembles the old one. The following year, the lighthouse was designated as surplus and in 2004 the Town of Caswell Beach gained ownership from the Federal Government of it, the surrounding grounds and adjacent oceanfront property. The transfer agreement requires the town to maintain the property for recreation purposes with the Coast Guard continuing to be responsible for operating the beacon. In April 2007, the Oak Island Lighthouse was added to the National Register of Historic Places. A major exterior rehabilitation of the structure was completed in 2016 by the International Chimney Corporation (the same company that moved the Cape Hatteras Light).

Until 2020 the Lighthouse used four 2.5 million candlepower aerobeacon lenses. The lighthouse experienced several power fluctuations causing the motor that rotates the lights to fail, which required the lights to be turned off. USCG ANT Oak Island (Aids to Navigation Team), the group responsible for maintaining the light, have been in the process of evaluating what it would take to upgrade the existing lights to a newer LED technology. With the failure of the motor, they determined that this would be the perfect opportunity and most cost-effective solution, to implement the new LED lights. The new LED light configuration is being assembled in New London CT, and is in the final stages of compliance testing. The new lights were installed and operational on Oak Island lighthouse in December 2020. The permanent LED lights will be brighter than the current ones due to the minimal Coast Guard light visibility requirements and will operate and rotate as the original lights did (a rotating structure with the appearance of 4 one second flashes followed by 6 seconds of blank). The new lights – 16 in all - are better protected from the elements and designed to be visible out to 20.5 nautical miles (almost 24 statute miles).

== Construction ==
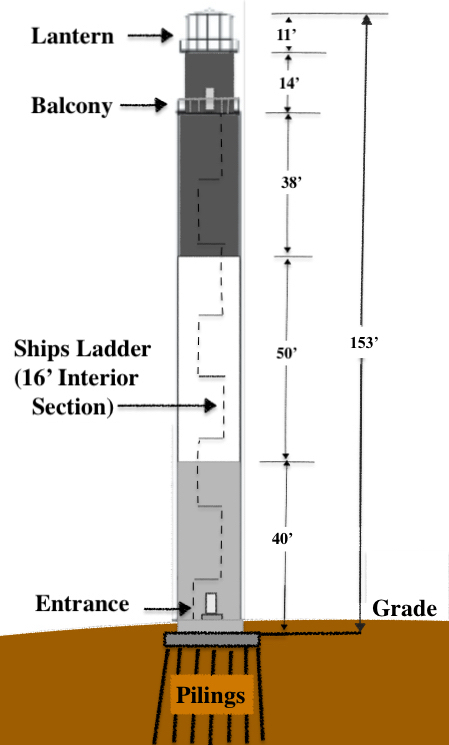
Oak Island Lighthouse

Built in 1957-58 by Brinkley, W.F. & Son Construction Co. located in Granite Quarry NC at a cost of $110,000, it was one of the last lighthouses constructed in the US. It rests on 24 pilings driven 67' deep to bedrock which are 10" round, filled with concrete and capped by a 30' wide by 3' deep octagonal concrete base. As for the structure itself, 142' of it is poured concrete, the top 52' of which is black, the middle 50' white, and the bottom 40' feet cement grey. The black and white colors are not painted on the structure, having instead been mixed into the concrete at the time the tower was constructed. On top of all of this sits an 11' tall aluminum and glass light enclosure. The inside of the tower has a uniform diameter of a little more than 16' 4", with the exterior concrete walls 8" thick. While the overall structure is 153' tall, it was sited on a small knoll, which has nautical charts showing the light as being 169' above sea level.

== Tours and accessibility ==
The Oak Island Lighthouse grounds are open to the public year-round for viewing and picture taking, with 30 minute parking provided at the base of the tower from sunrise until sunset. A walkway to the beach provides a good vantage point for photos of the structure, and descriptive placards along the way describe the site history and resident wildlife/vegetation. The structure itself and the walkway are cared for and managed by a citizens group, Friends of Oak Island Lighthouse (FOIL). Up until the restrictions imposed by the Covid pandemic, the interior of the lighthouse was open for visits by the general public, aged seven or above, with tours to the second level (up twelve steps) from Memorial Day–Labor Day on Wednesdays and Saturdays from 10 a.m. until 2 p.m. Tours to the top of the lighthouse, which has an outside balcony, were offered year round (except for a few major holidays) for those aged nine or older. It required climbing 131 steps, which unlike the classic circular pattern, have straight but very steep sections with eight landings along the way, a style referred to as a 'ships ladder.' A minimum of two weeks (four weeks in the summer months) advance notice were normally required for such a tour reservation, which could be obtained on-line by visiting the FOIL web site.

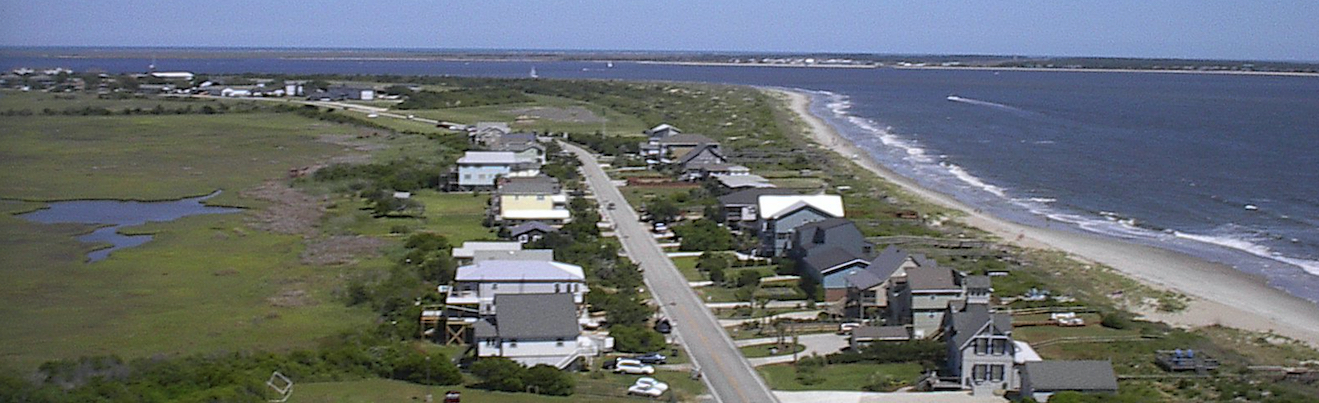
View from the Oak Island Lighthouse balcony looking towards the east end of Oak Island and the mouth of the Cape Fear River
