= Oak Island Life Saving Station =

- U.S. National Register of Historic Places
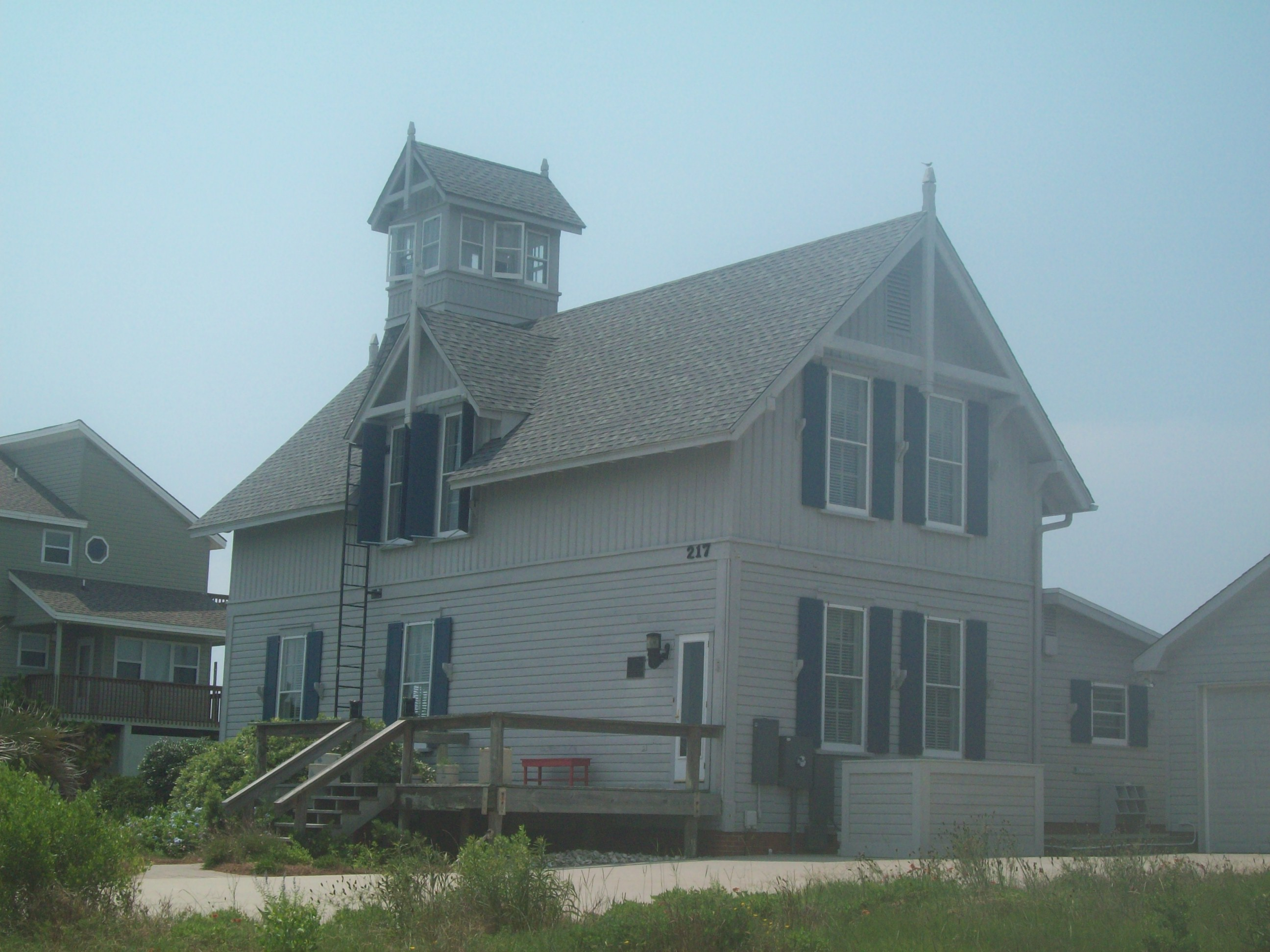
- Oak Island Life Saving Station, June 2010

- Location within North Carolina Location within the United States
- Location: 217 Caswell Beach Rd., Caswell Beach, North Carolina
- Coordinates: 33°53′29″N 78°2′1″W
- Area: 0.4 acres (0.16 ha)
- Built: 1889
- Built by: Parkinson, J. Lake
- Architectural style: Stick/eastlake
- NRHP reference No.: 00001553
- Added to NRHP: December 28, 2000

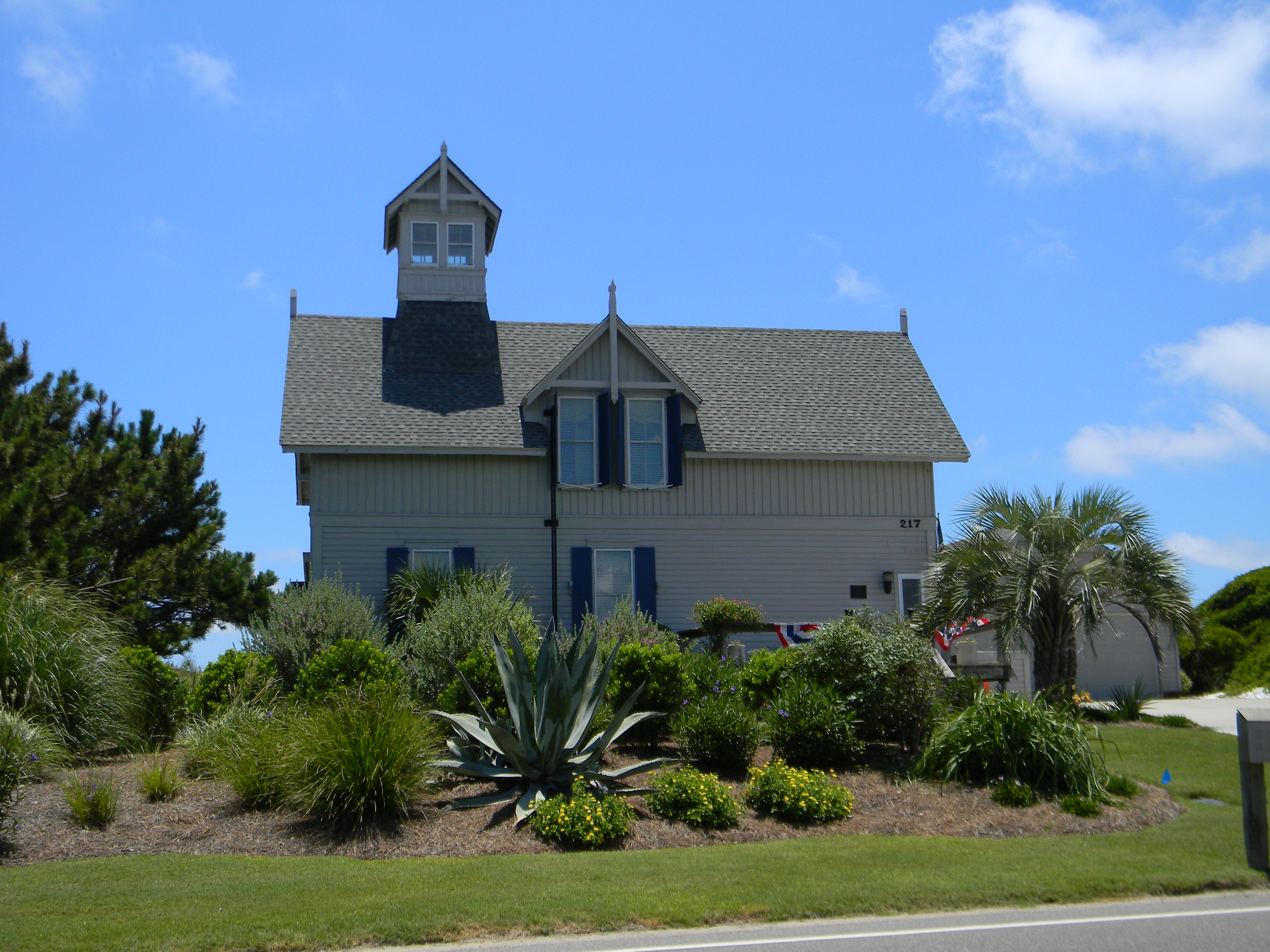
Oak Island Life Saving Station, 2016

Oak Island Life Saving Station is a historic life saving station located at Caswell Beach, Brunswick County, North Carolina. It was built in 1889 by the United States Life-Saving Service. It is a 1 1/2-story, front-gabled frame structure. It features a large lookout tower projecting from the roof. Its siding trusswork, and brackets are characteristic of the Stick style. The station was sold to a private owner in 1938 and moved directly across the road from its original location. It was added to the National Register of Historic Places in 2000.
