= South Carolina Highway 179 =

State highway in South Carolina, United States

South Carolina Highway 179

Route information
- Maintained by SCDOT
- Length: 0.670 mi (1,078 m)
- Existed: 1979–present

Major junctions
- South end: US 17 in Little River
- North end: NC 179 at the North Carolina state line near Calabash, NC

Location
- Country: United States
- State: South Carolina
- Counties: Horry

Highway system
- South Carolina State Highway System; Interstate; US; State; Scenic
← US 178	→ SC 181

South Carolina Highway 179 (SC 179) is a 0.670-mile-long (1.078 km) primary state highway in the U.S. state of South Carolina. It travels from Little River to the North Carolina state line, near Calabash.

== Route description ==
One of the shortest state highways in the state, SC 179 starts at U.S. Route 17 (US 17) in Little River and travels to the North Carolina state line. The route continues on as NC 179, connecting the towns of Calabash, Sunset Beach, Ocean Isle Beach and Shallotte. The entire route is two lanes wide with brief sections with a center turn lane.

== History ==
The first SC 179 existed from 1932 to 1950, established as a renumbering of SC 178. It ran from US 17 east, through Jamestown, to the Charleston County line near Honey Hill. By 1938, it reached its zenith by extensions to McClellanville and across the Cooper River. In 1950, SC 179 was completely removed, majority of the route becoming secondary roads, with some sections living on as US 17 Alt. and SC 45.

The current SC 179 was established in 1979; it complements NC 179 when North Carolina established the new route and routed the southern end into South Carolina. The route has changed little since.

== Major intersections ==
The entire route is in Little River, Horry County.

mi	km	Destinations	Notes
0.000	0.000	US 17 / Graystone Boulevard – North Myrtle Beach, Shallotte	Southern terminus
0.670	1.078	NC 179 north – Calabash	Continuation into North Carolina
1.000 mi = 1.609 km; 1.000 km = 0.621 mi
