= Ingram Planetarium =

Planetarium in North Carolina

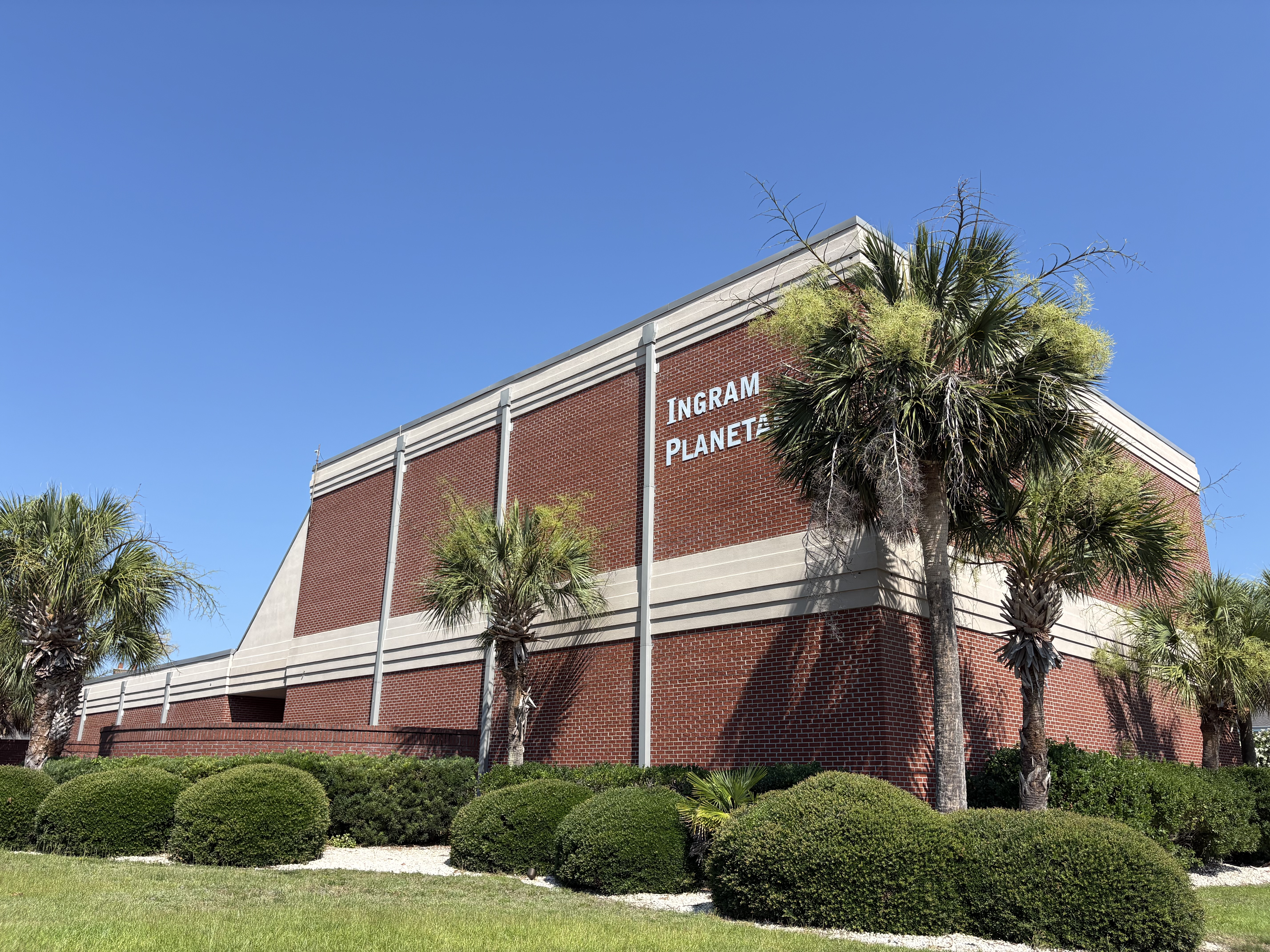
- Ingram Planetarium in 2026

- Shown within North Carolina
- Established: May 2002
- Location: The Village at Sunset Beach, 7625 High Market Street, Sunset Beach, North Carolina
- Coordinates: 33.896439°N 78.492653°W
- Type: Planetarium
- Directors: Jim Hoffman, Executive Director
- Curators: Katherine Hunt, Planetarium Manager
- Website: http://www.museumplanetarium.org

Ingram Planetarium is a planetarium located at Sunset Beach in Brunswick County, North Carolina. The Board of Trustees of the Ocean Isle Museum Foundation, Inc. is the governing body of Ingram Planetarium as well as the Museum of Coastal Carolina, located at Ocean Isle Beach, North Carolina.
