= North Carolina Highway 179 =

State highway in Brunswick County, North Carolina, US

North Carolina Highway 179

Route information
- Maintained by NCDOT
- Length: 16.2 mi (26.1 km)
- Existed: 1979–present

Major junctions
- South end: SC 179 at the South Carolina state line near Little River, SC
- NC 904 in Ocean Isle Beach
- North end: US 17 Bus. / NC 130 in Shallotte

Location
- Country: United States
- State: North Carolina
- Counties: Brunswick

Highway system
- North Carolina Highway System; Interstate; US; State; Scenic
← US 178	→ NC 180

North Carolina Highway 179 (NC 179) is a primary state highway in the U.S. state of North Carolina. It runs from the South Carolina state line, near Little River, to Shallotte.

== Route description ==
Though NC 179 begins at the state line, SC 179 is a short 0.7-mile-long (1.1 km) road that connects to US 17 in Little River. From the state line, NC 179 goes through the town of Calabash. With a short concurrency with NC 904, it continues northeast through Ocean Isle Beach ending in Shallotte. The entire route is two lanes wide.

== History ==
Established in 1979, NC 179 was new routing over mostly existing secondary roads, including the concurrency with NC 904. In August 2000, NC 179 was rerouted north around Sunset Beach; a year later NC 179 Business was established along the original route through Sunset Beach.

== Junction list ==
The entire route is in Brunswick County.

Location	mi	km	Destinations	Notes
Carolina Shores	0.0	0.0	SC 179 south – Little River	South Carolina state line
Calabash	2.0	3.2	NC 179 Bus. north (Beach Drive) – Sunset Beach	Southern terminus of NC 179 Bus.
Sunset Beach	6.0	9.7	NC 904 west (Seaside Road) – Grissettown	West end of NC 904 overlap
Sunset Beach	7.0	11.3	NC 179 Bus. south (Sunset Boulevard)	Northern terminus of NC 179 Bus.
Ocean Isle Beach	10.0	16.1	NC 904 east (Causeway Drive) – Ocean Isle Beach	East end of NC 904 overlap
Shallotte	16.2	26.1	US 17 Bus. (Main Street) / NC 130 (Whiteville Road) – Calabash, Whiteville, Holden Beach, Supply	
1.000 mi = 1.609 km; 1.000 km = 0.621 mi: Concurrency terminus

== Special routes ==
=== Calabash–Sunset Beach business loop ===
North Carolina Highway 179 Business
- Location: Calabash–Sunset Beach, NC
- Length: 5.4 mi (8.7 km)
- Existed: 2001–present

North Carolina Highway 179 Business (NC 179 Bus) was established in 2001 as an upgrade of secondary roads: Beach Drive, Shoreline Drive, and Sunset Beach Boulevard.

The entire route is in Brunswick County.

Location	mi	km	Destinations	Notes
Calabash	0.0	0.0	NC 179 to US 17	
Ocean Isle Beach	5.4	8.7	NC 179 / NC 904 – Shallotte, Longwood	
1.000 mi = 1.609 km; 1.000 km = 0.621 mi
