= February 13–17, 2021 North American winter storm =

Category 3 winter storm and ice storm in the United States

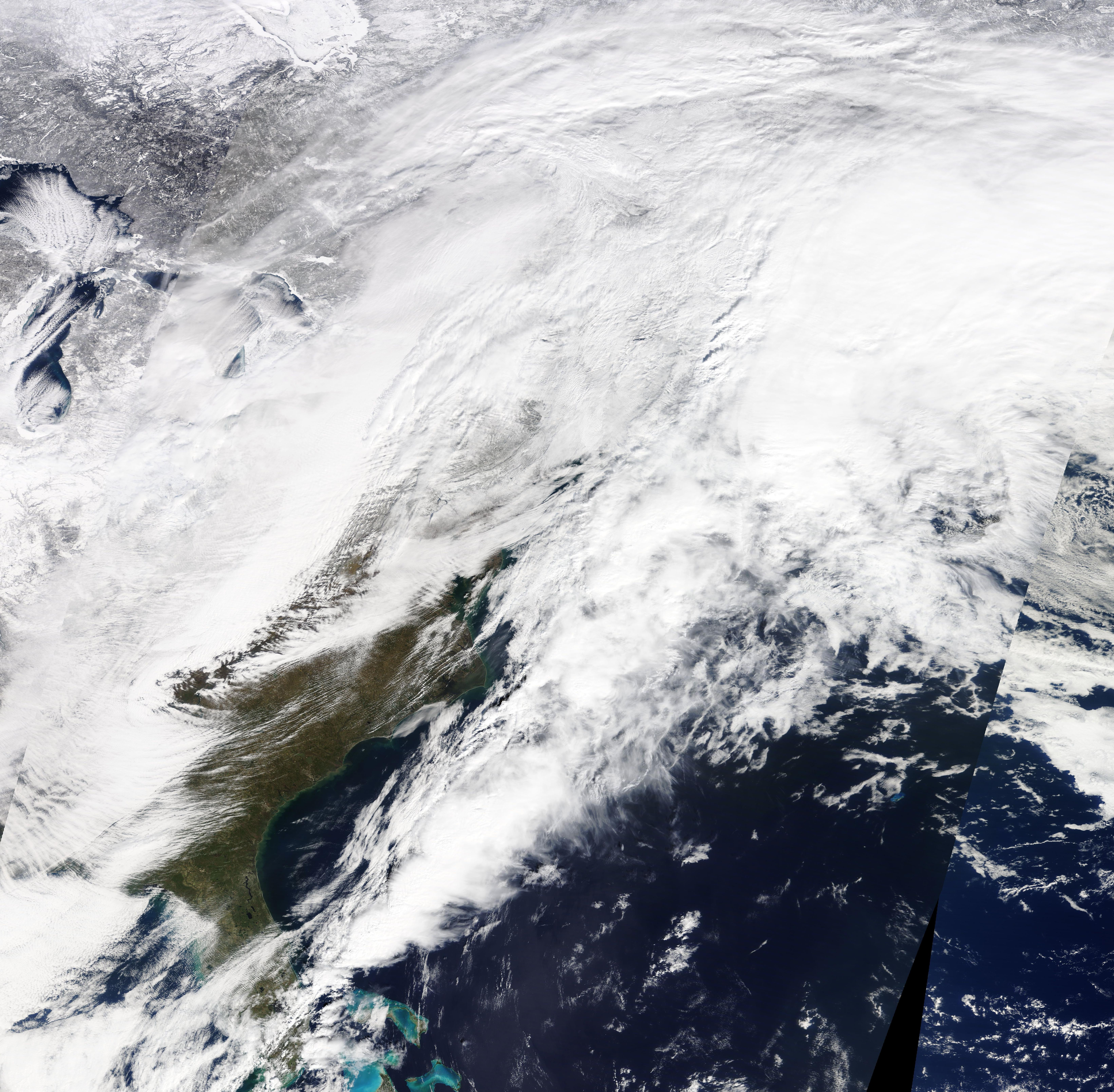
- Satellite imagery of the winter storm over the Eastern United States on February 16

Meteorological history
- Formed: February 13, 2021
- Exited land: February 17, 2021
- Dissipated: February 24, 2021

Category 3 "Major" winter storm
- Regional snowfall index: 8.05 (NOAA)
- Highest winds: 75 mph (120 km/h) (1-minute sustained winds)
- Lowest pressure: 960 mbar (hPa); 28.35 inHg
- Lowest temp: −30 °F (−34.44 °C)
- Max. snowfall: 26 in (66 cm)

Tornado outbreak
- Tornadoes: 6
- Max. rating: EF3 tornado
- Highest winds: 160 mph (260 km/h)

Overall effects
- Fatalities: ≥290 (426–978 estimated in Texas)
- Damage: ≥$25.5 billion (2021 USD)
- Areas affected: United States, Canada, Northern Mexico, British Isles, Iceland, Southern Greenland
- Power outages: >9,924,000
- Part of the 2020–21 North American winter and tornado outbreaks of 2021

A crippling winter and ice storm, unofficially named Winter Storm Uri by the Weather Channel and various media outlets and government agencies, also referred to as the Great Texas Freeze or Snowmageddon, caused catastrophic and widespread impacts across the United States, Northern Mexico, and parts of Canada from February 13 to 17, 2021. It started out in the Pacific Northwest and quickly moved into the Southern United States, before moving on to the Midwestern and Northeastern United States a couple of days later.

The storm resulted in the National Weather Service issuing various winter weather alerts impacting over 170 million Americans. Over 9.9 million people in the U.S. and Mexico experienced blackouts, many due to a major power crisis in Texas, which became the largest in the U.S. since the Northeast blackout of 2003. The storm contributed to a severe cold wave that affected most of North America. The storm also brought severe destructive weather to Southeastern United States, including several tornadoes. On February 16, there were at least 20 direct fatalities and 13 indirect fatalities attributed to the storm; by January 2, 2022, the death toll had risen to at least 290, including 276 people in the United States and 14 people in Mexico. A subsequent data analysis using a technique that examined the total number of reported deaths during and immediately after the storm estimated that about 700 people were killed by the storm during the week in which the power outages were most widespread.

The National Oceanic and Atmospheric Administration officially documented US$26.5 billion in damage in the United States from the winter storm. It was also the deadliest winter storm in North America since the 1993 Storm of the Century, which killed 318 people.

== Meteorological history ==
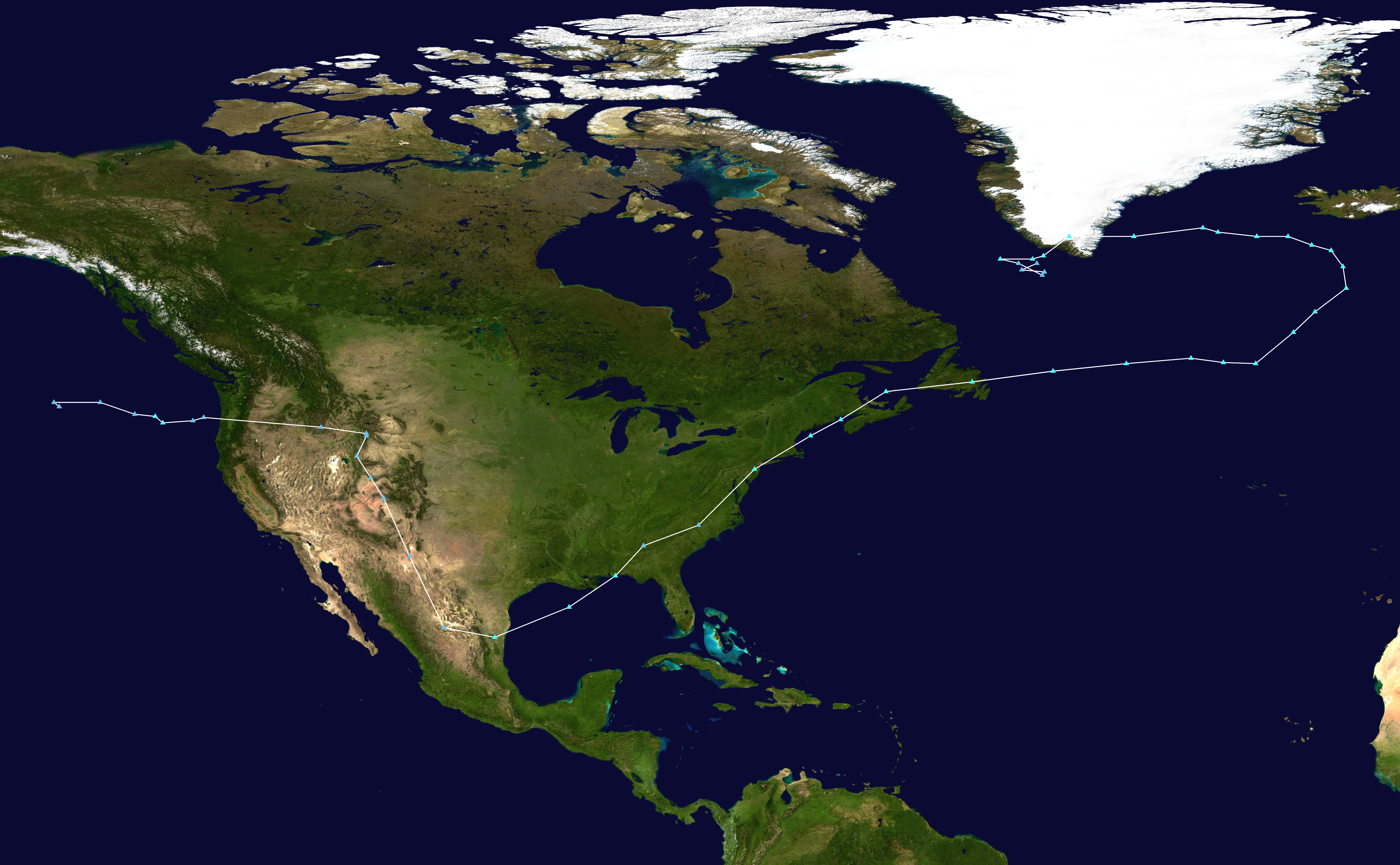
Map plotting the storm's track and intensity, according to the Saffir–Simpson scale Map key Saffir–Simpson scale Tropical depression (≤38 mph, ≤62 km/h) Tropical storm (39–73 mph, 63–118 km/h) Category 1 (74–95 mph, 119–153 km/h) Category 2 (96–110 mph, 154–177 km/h) Category 3 (111–129 mph, 178–208 km/h) Category 4 (130–156 mph, 209–251 km/h) Category 5 (≥157 mph, ≥252 km/h) Unknown Storm type Tropical cyclone Subtropical cyclone Extratropical cyclone, remnant low, tropical disturbance, or monsoon depression

On February 13, a frontal storm developed off the coast of the Pacific Northwest and moved ashore, before moving southeastward, with the storm becoming disorganized in the process. During this time, the storm reached a minimum pressure of 992 millibars (29.3 inHg) over the Rocky Mountains. On the same day, The Weather Channel gave the storm the unofficial name Winter Storm Uri; the Federal Communications Commission adopted the name in their reports from February 17. From February 12 to 13, a trough dipped southward from Northern California into northern Mexico, which channeled moisture from Texas towards the storm, as the system moved southeastward. Over the next couple of days, the storm began to develop as it entered the Southern United States and moved into Texas. From February 13 to 14, a second, much larger trough developed over Central United States, aided by a southward shift from the polar vortex, while the winter storm moved into Texas. The trough became fully developed by February 15, channeling significant amounts of moisture into the winter storm and also contributing to a historic cold wave that affected most of the Central and Eastern United States. Winds in the jet stream reached 170 mph (275 km/h) around the trough. On February 15, the system developed a new surface low off the coast of the Florida Panhandle, as the storm turned northeastward and expanded in size.

On February 16, the storm developed another low-pressure center to the north as the system grew more organized, while moving towards the northeast. Later that day, the storm broke in half, with the newer storm moving northward into Quebec, while the original system moved off the East Coast of the U.S. By the time the winter storm exited the U.S. late on February 16, the combined snowfall from the multiple winter storms within the past month had left nearly 75% of the contiguous United States covered by snow, which was the largest amount of snow cover seen in the United States since early 2003. On February 17, the storm's secondary low dissipated as the system approached landfall on Newfoundland, intensifying in the process. At 12:00 UTC that day, the storm's central pressure reached 985 millibars (29.1 inHg), as the center of the storm moved over Newfoundland. On the same day, the storm was given the name Belrem by the Free University of Berlin. The storm continued to strengthen as it moved across the North Atlantic, with the storm's central pressure dropping to 960 millibars (28 inHg) by February 19. On February 20, the storm developed a second low-pressure area and gradually began to weaken, as it moved northwestward towards Iceland. Afterward, the storm turned westward and moved across southern Greenland on February 22, weakening even further as it did so. The storm then stalled south of Greenland, while continuing to weaken, before dissipating on February 24.

== Preparations and impact ==
All warnings and advisories issued in the Central and Eastern United States due to the storm
Winter Storm Warning
Winter Storm Watch
Winter Weather Advisory

=== United States ===
On February 14, the expected impacts from the storm resulted in over 170 million Americans being placed under various winter weather alerts across the United States, which saw the largest portion of the country covered by winter weather alerts in 15 years. Over 120 million of those people were placed under winter storm warnings or ice storm warnings by the National Weather Service. The winter storm caused power grids to fail across the U.S., causing blackouts for over 5.2 million homes and businesses, the vast majority of which were in the state of Texas, which became one of the largest blackout events in modern U.S. history, the largest one since the Northeast blackout of 2003. The storm was initially reported to have caused 70 deaths across the United States, later updated to at least 276 people dead, 246 of them in Texas. A BuzzFeed study in May 2021 estimated that the winter storm may have killed a total of 702 people in Texas, which would add hundreds of deaths to the official death toll if verified. The system was estimated by NOAA to have cost $21 billion in damage in the United States, making it the costliest winter storm in U.S. history at the time. City of Austin and Travis County officials estimated that the winter storm caused at least $195 billion in damage in Texas, making the winter storm the single-costliest natural disaster in the history of Texas and the United States as a whole. Some insurance firms had estimated a damage total of between 195 and 295 billion dollars.

==== Northwest ====
Snow in Portland, Oregon, on February 14, 2021

The winter storm was the second of the two snowstorms that swept through the region within a one-week period. 11.1 inches (28 cm) of snow in Seattle, Washington, compounded the previous storm. This was the largest two-day snowfall recorded in Seattle since 1972.

The Portland metro area was hit very hard by the storm, which brought a mix of snow and ice to the region. 9.4 inches (24 cm) of snow fell at Portland International Airport on February 12–13, the most snow to fall over this city in a two-day period since 1968. Over 270,000 people were left without power in the region, with 401 miles (645 km) of power lines needing to be restored. The storm led to the largest power outage in state history. Around 45 mi (72 km) of Interstate 84 was shut down due to the storm. Governor Kate Brown declared a state of emergency. Four people were killed in Oregon by carbon monoxide poisoning. Damage in Oregon totaled $26,874,426.

9.9 inches (25 cm) of snow fell in Boise, Idaho, during this same time period, making this the largest-recorded two-day snowfall event for that city since 1996. In Salt Lake City, the 11.7 inches (30 cm) made this storm their snowiest February day on record.

==== Southwest ====
The storm brought heavy snow and bitterly cold temperatures to Colorado and New Mexico. Snow amounts in Colorado ranged from a few inches in the north to over 2 feet (0.61 m) in the San Juan Mountains in northern New Mexico and southern Colorado. In New Mexico, the storm system brought a combination of heavy snow, strong winds, and bitterly cold temperatures. On February 14, a Blizzard Warning was issued for the Albuquerque metro area due to strong winds exceeding 50 miles per hour (80 km/h), cold temperatures, and blowing snow. Meanwhile, Winter Storm Warnings were issued for much of the rest of New Mexico. Up to 2 feet (61 cm) of snow fell in the mountains of northern and central New Mexico. Snow amounts in the Albuquerque metropolitan area ranged from 2 to 6 inches (5.1 to 15.2 cm). Interstate Highway 40 through the Albuquerque metro area was closed for several hours due to numerous motor vehicle crashes caused by the icy conditions. Southern New Mexico received up to 2 inches (5.1 cm) of snow accumulation, with locally higher amounts in the mountains. Some residents throughout the state reported power outages during the storm as weather stations had recorded the temperature dropping down to 2 °F (-16.67 °C) in many areas while others were not affected but the exact number isn't clear.

==== Central and Southern Plains ====
Drone footage of Houston

Snowfall movement McKinney, Texas

With the threat of icing, the Texas Department of Transportation (TxDOT) pre-treated roadways, using a brine-salt mix, across six Southeast Texas counties. For the first time on record, the National Weather Service (through its 13 regional offices serving Texas and adjoining portions of Oklahoma, New Mexico, Arkansas and Louisiana) issued winter storm warnings for all 254 counties in the state. In addition, Houston saw their first-ever wind chill warning, as wind chills dipped to 0 °F (−18 °C). Wind chills predicted to be at or below −18 °F (−28 °C) prompted the first-ever wind chill warning for Dallas as well.

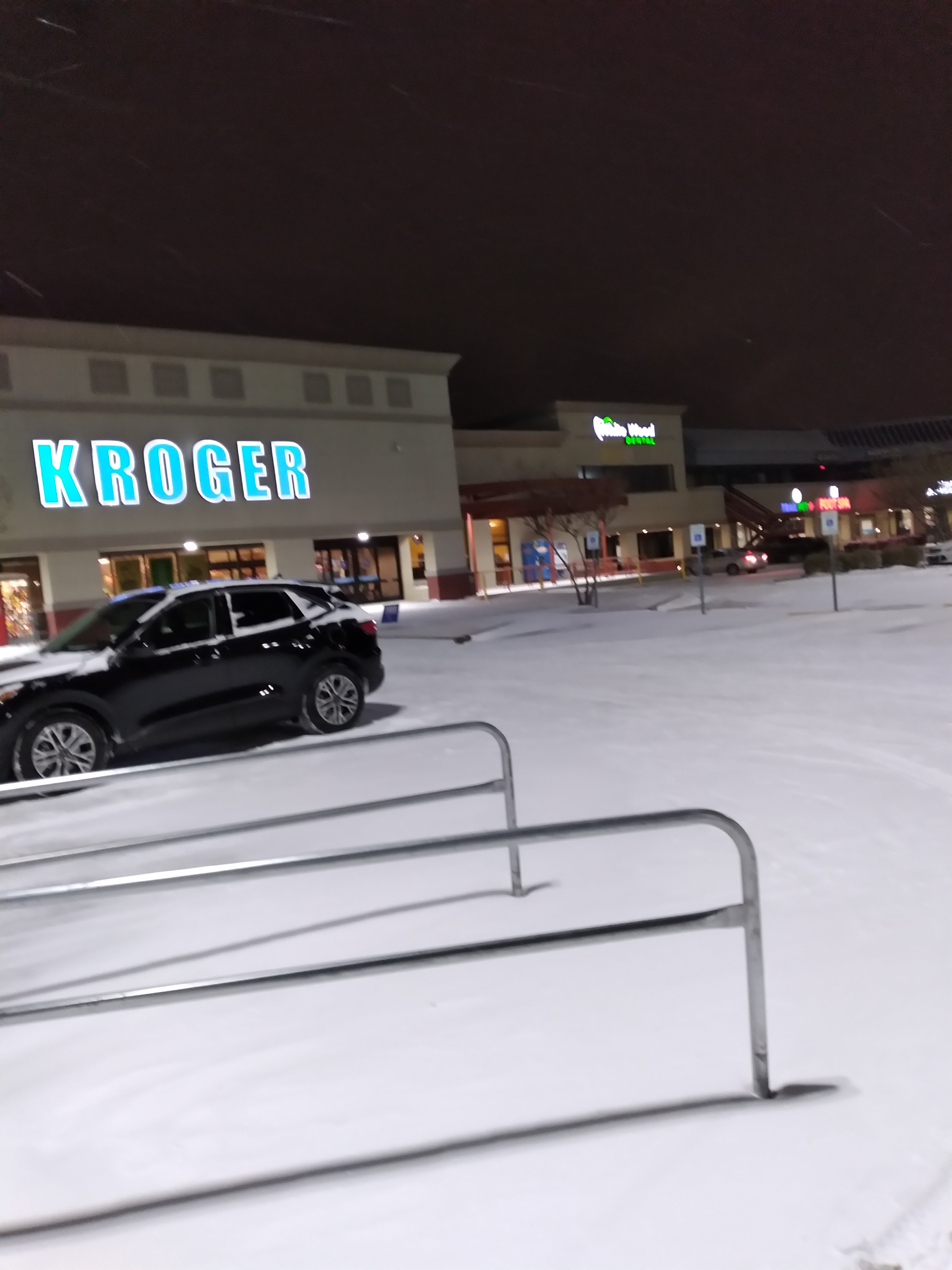
Snow at a Kroger grocery store in North Dallas

On February 14–15, the storm dropped prolific amounts of snow across Texas and Oklahoma. As a result of the winter storm and a concurrent cold wave, power grids—unable to sustain the higher-than-normal energy and heating demand from residential and business customers—failed across the Texas Interconnection; at the peak of the outages, at least 4.5 million Texas residents were left without electricity. Two of the electricity reliability commissions servicing the Southern U.S., the Southwest Power Pool (SPP) and the Electric Reliability Council of Texas (ERCOT), ordered rolling blackouts for 14 states amid the frigid temperatures, in an attempt to manage the strain on the power grid and prevent widespread, long-duration blackouts. The controlled outages were initiated after the Southwest Power Pool declared Level 3 Emergency Energy Alerts on both February 15 and 16; the SPP and ERCOT faced criticism by government officials and residents in the region for the limited advanced notice of the outages, and for not outlining the specific areas serviced by SPP partner utilities that would be affected.

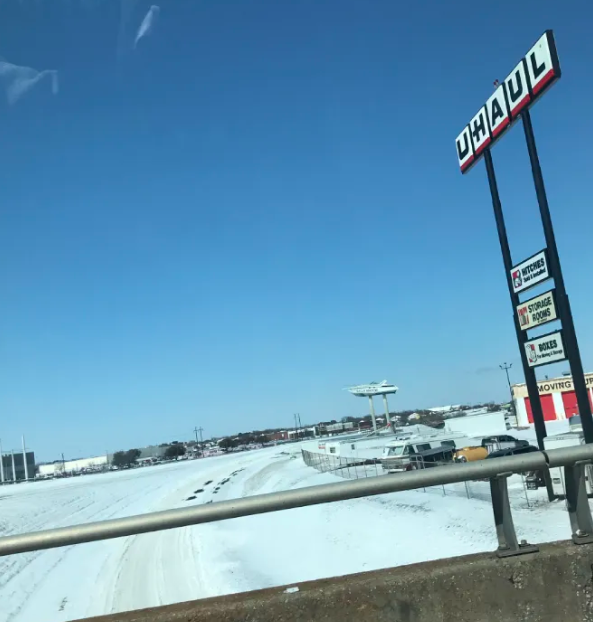
Snow-covered off-ramp on I-30 in Fort Worth, Texas, near NASJRB.

At one point during the rolling outages, over 4.2 million people across the south-central states were left without power, with over 3.5 million of them in Texas alone. The rolling blackouts led to calls by Governor Greg Abbott for the Texas Legislature to conduct investigations into preparations and decisions undertaken by ERCOT in advance of the storm. Some of the blackouts were initiated as several cities throughout the Central and Southern Plains experienced record overnight low temperatures: on February 16 alone, daily record lows were broken in Oklahoma City (−14 °F [−26 °C], the city's coldest temperature since 1899 and its second coldest on record), Dallas (−2 °F [−19 °C], the city's coldest temperature since 1930 and its second coldest on record), Houston (13 °F [−11 °C], the city's coldest temperature since 1989), San Antonio (5 °F [−15 °C], the city's coldest temperature since 1989) and Little Rock (−1 °F [−18 °C], the city's coldest temperature since 1989), with all-time low temperatures being set in Fayetteville, Arkansas (−20 °F [−29 °C]) and Hastings, Nebraska (−30 °F [−34 °C]).

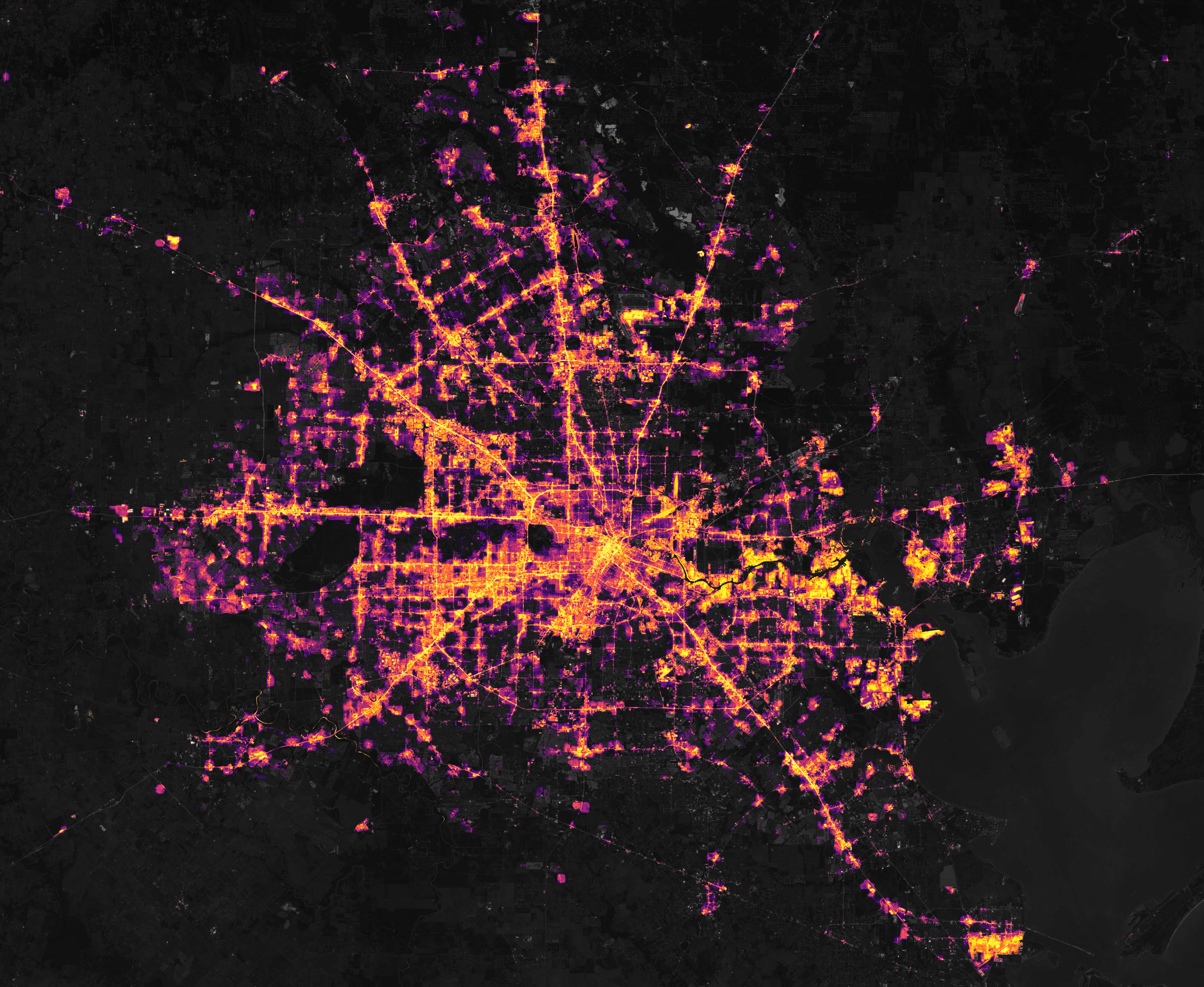
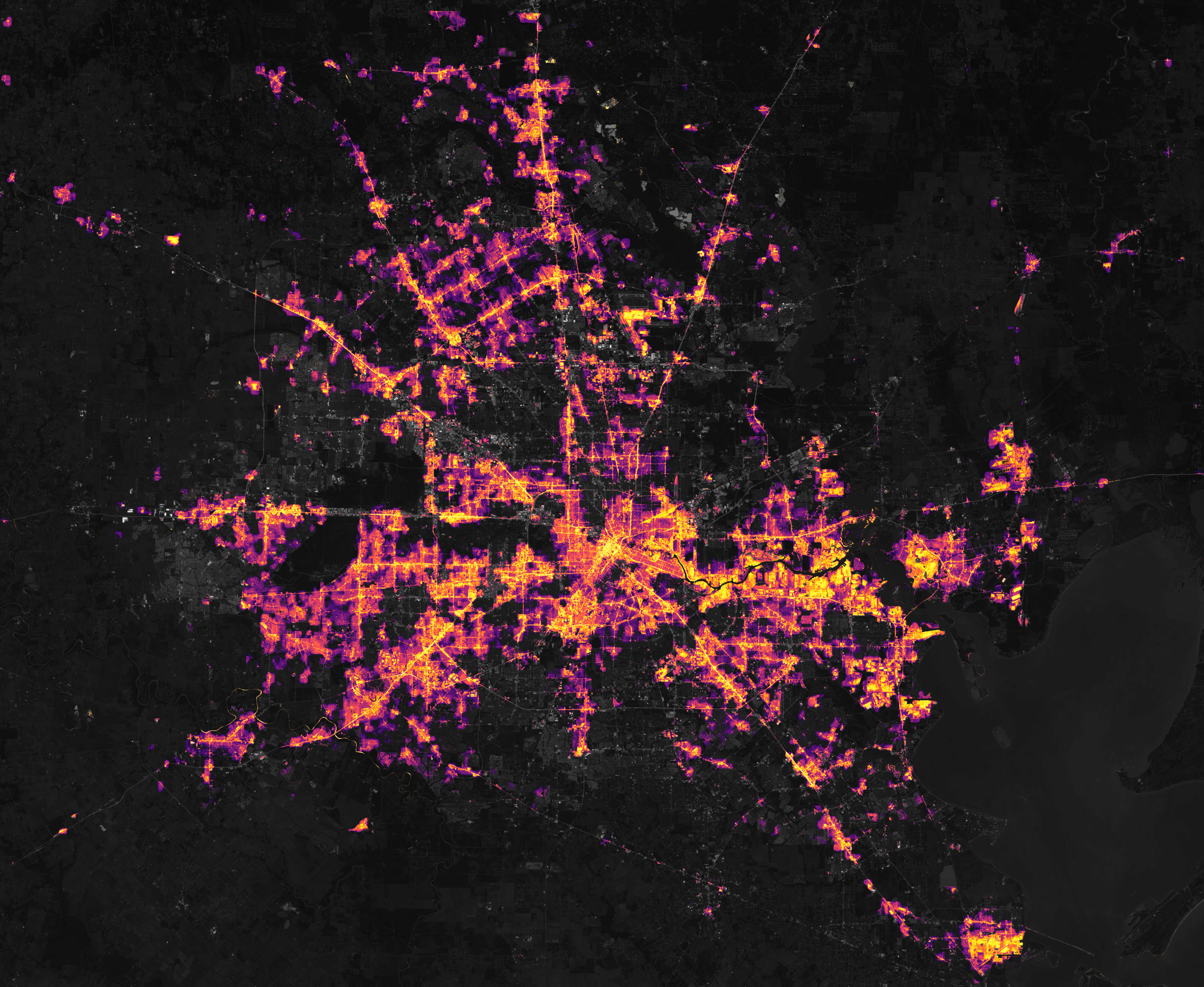
Satellite image of Houston, Texas on February 7 (left) before the storm and on Feb. 16 (right) after the storm. The dark patches in the latter image depict areas left without electricity.

Rolling blackouts, longer-duration power outages and ice accretion caused by the precipitation and unusually cold temperatures (for the region's climate) caused widespread disruptions to water distribution systems across the Southern Plains. There were water line breaks in many areas, and power disruptions affected water treatment plants in parts of the region that forced several cities—including Houston, San Antonio, Fort Worth, Abilene, Austin, Killeen and Arlington, Texas; and Shreveport, Louisiana—to enact residential boil-water orders (i.e., to boil drinking water to kill pathogens); By February 18, more than 13 million people in Texas lived in areas where boiling water was advised, or using bottled water if heating was not possible. This led to shortages of bottled water in Houston grocery stores. Pipe bursts caused significant damage to numerous residences in the Dallas area and other areas of North Texas.

A visible satellite loop of a snow-covered South Central U.S. in the aftermath of the winter storm on February 15, 2021

After consulting Dallas Mayor Eric Johnson, two National Hockey League games between the Nashville Predators and the Dallas Stars that were scheduled for the evenings of February 15 and 16 at American Airlines Center were postponed. In contrast, the Oklahoma City Thunder opted to hold their February 16 home game against the Portland Trail Blazers as scheduled, even as most other buildings in Downtown Oklahoma City decided to turn off lighting and electrical equipment overnight to reduce strain on the city's power grid; the NBA team stated that Chesapeake Energy Arena would take steps to conserve power while the game was being played, including turning off concourse lighting, video panels, exterior signage and most outdoor lighting. The Memphis Grizzlies also played against the Oklahoma City Thunder without fans due to the storm.

Due to the deregulated electricity market and the spike in demand, wholesale electricity prices increased, in some places by 10,000 percent, from February 10, leading to extremely high bills of up to $450 for one day's use. Power outages even affected the Big Bend National Park. On February 17, U.S. Senator Ted Cruz stirred controversy when he was filmed boarding an airplane to Cancún, Mexico with his family. He returned to Houston the following day, and admitted he had scheduled the vacation to avoid freezing conditions inside their home.

Snow in Norman, Oklahoma on February 15, 2021

In Oklahoma, winter storm warnings were issued for all 77 counties in the state ahead of the storm by National Weather Service offices in Norman, Tulsa, Amarillo and Shreveport. Governor Kevin Stitt also issued a statewide winter weather State of Emergency on February 12, as the state was already dealing with effects from minor winter weather events and prolonged sub-freezing temperatures from previous days. Widespread areas of 3–8 inches (7.6–20.3 cm) snowfall were recorded throughout the state, with locally higher amounts. Roosevelt saw 12 inches (30 cm) of snow, the highest total measured in the state during the event.

The heavy, blowing snow caused massive travel issues across the state on February 14. By 5:20 p.m. CST that day, the Oklahoma Highway Patrol had responded to 56 non-injury collisions, 24 injury collisions, and 116 motorist assists. A fiery crash involving multiple vehicles, including two semi-trucks, shut down the Turner Turnpike near Hiwassee Road in northeastern Oklahoma County, with westbound traffic being diverted to the Kickapoo Turnpike and eastbound traffic being diverted to I-35. Another vehicle collision on I-35 near Braman caused one fatality. The record cold temperatures during the event also caused a dam at Lake Overholser to completely freeze over.

By February 16, the storm had killed at least 17 people across the South. By February 18, the death toll rose to at least 47. At least 10 people in Texas died in weather-related incidents since February 14, including a mother and a child due to carbon monoxide poisoning. By January 2, 2022, the Texas State Government revised the official death toll in Texas to 246. Nine other people in the South, outside Texas, died as a result of the system or through indirect storm-related incidents. According to a BuzzFeed study in May 2021, based on the excess mortalities in Texas in February 2021, the actual death toll of the winter storm may range from 426 to 978 in Texas, with a mean estimate of 702, which would add hundreds of deaths to the official death toll, if verified. The official death toll was modified in December 2021 with the Texas Department of State Health Services announcing a death toll of 246.

The storm was also partially responsible for a nationwide chicken shortage, due to the freezing temperatures, widespread power and water outages that lasted days.

==== Great Lakes ====
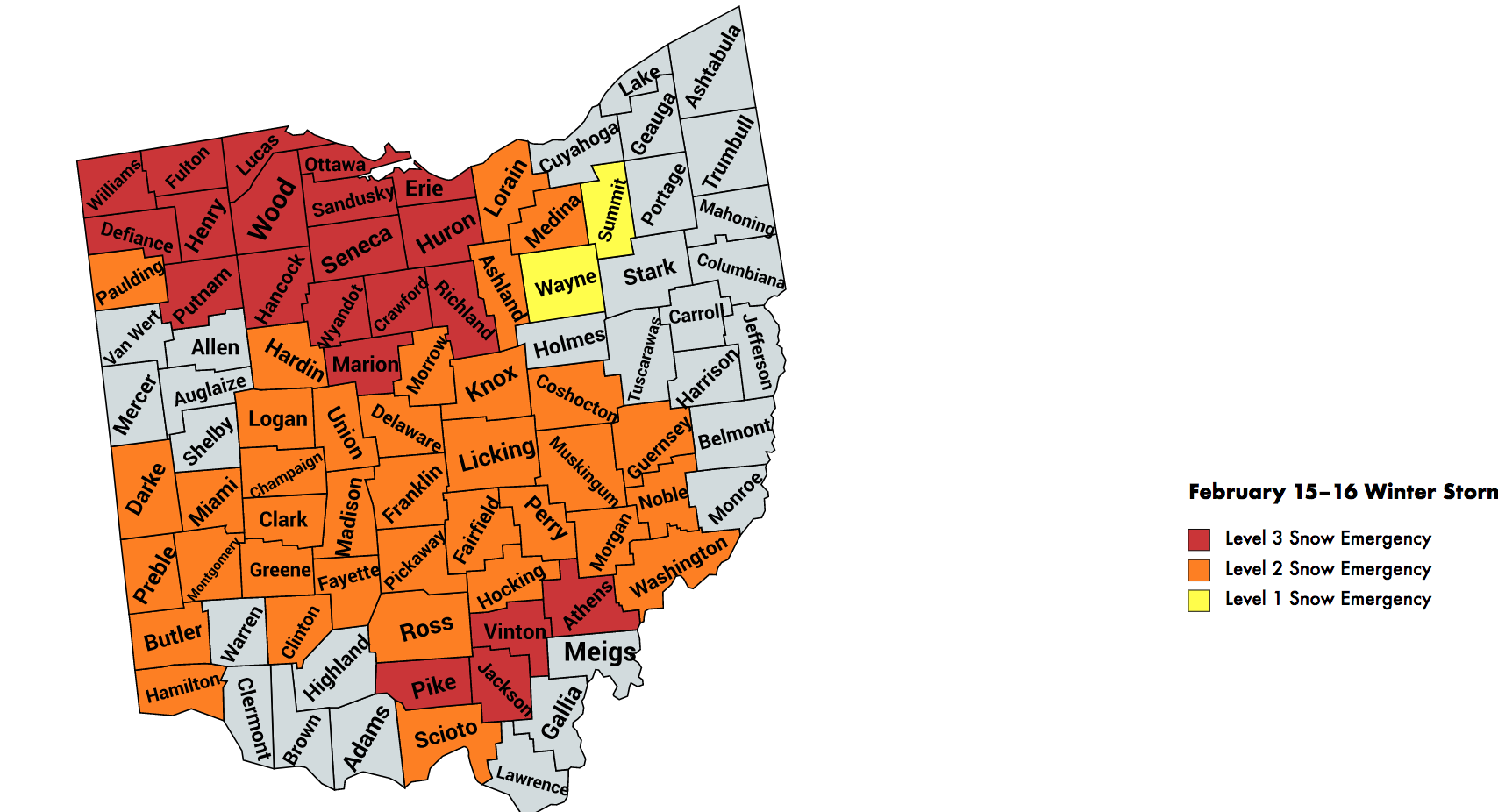
Map of snow emergencies in Ohio from February 15–16, 2021, at their most severe levels

Snow in Chicago, Illinois on February 15, 2021

Chicago along with other cities in northern Illinois received up to 14–17 in (36–43 cm) of snow along with winds up to 20 mph (32 km/h). Due to the snowstorm, several Chicago Transit Authority trains suspended operations on February 16. Chicago experienced its snowiest three-week period since 1979. Indianapolis, Indiana, received about 7 in (180 mm) of snow as well as Detroit, Michigan, also had 7 in (18 cm) of snow. Toledo, Ohio, received 14.5 in (37 cm) of snow, the third-highest two-day snowfall record, and the highest since 1912. Other Northern Ohio cities received up to 10–12 in (25–30 cm) of snow while cities in the central part received up to 3 in (7.6 cm) of snow like in Columbus, Ohio. After the storm, Milwaukee set a record for deepest snow depth ever.

=== Mexico ===
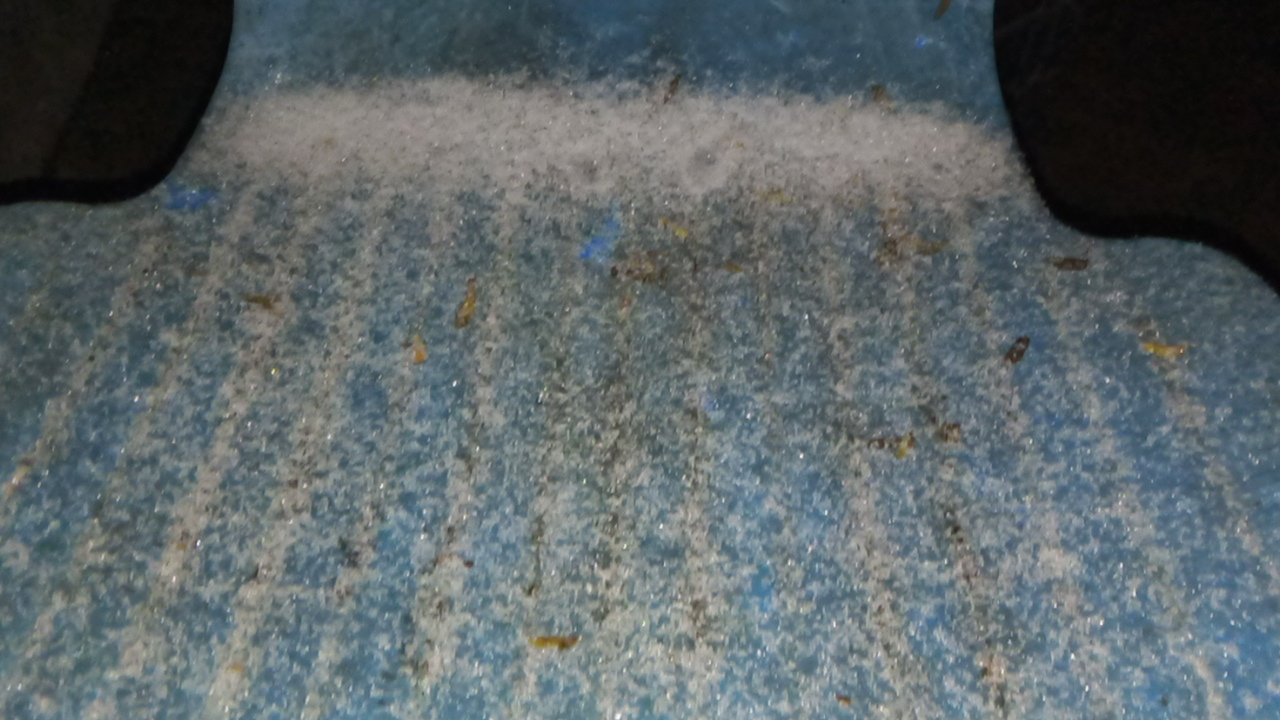
Snow in a chair in Monterrey, Mexico, on the early morning of February 15. Temperature was 33 °F (1 °C).

The winter storm strained the power grids in northern Mexico, leading to cascading blackouts for 4.7 million homes and businesses in Mexico. Temperatures as low as −18 °C (0 °F) were recorded, as shortages of natural gas led to blackouts in Nuevo León, Coahuila, Tamaulipas, and Chihuahua along the border with Texas. At least 14 people died in Ciudad Juárez, Chihuahua; Río Bravo and Matamoros, Tamaulipas; and Monterrey, Nuevo León; due to the winter storm. President Andrés Manuel López Obrador (AMLO) said on February 17 that Mexico would increase the use of oil and coal to produce electricity, as well as purchase three shiploads of natural gas to deal with power shortages. He also warned that periodic local outages would continue through February 21. Local authorities said that no hospitals had been left without electricity at any time. The storm was estimated to have caused over US$1.5 billion in damages in Mexico.

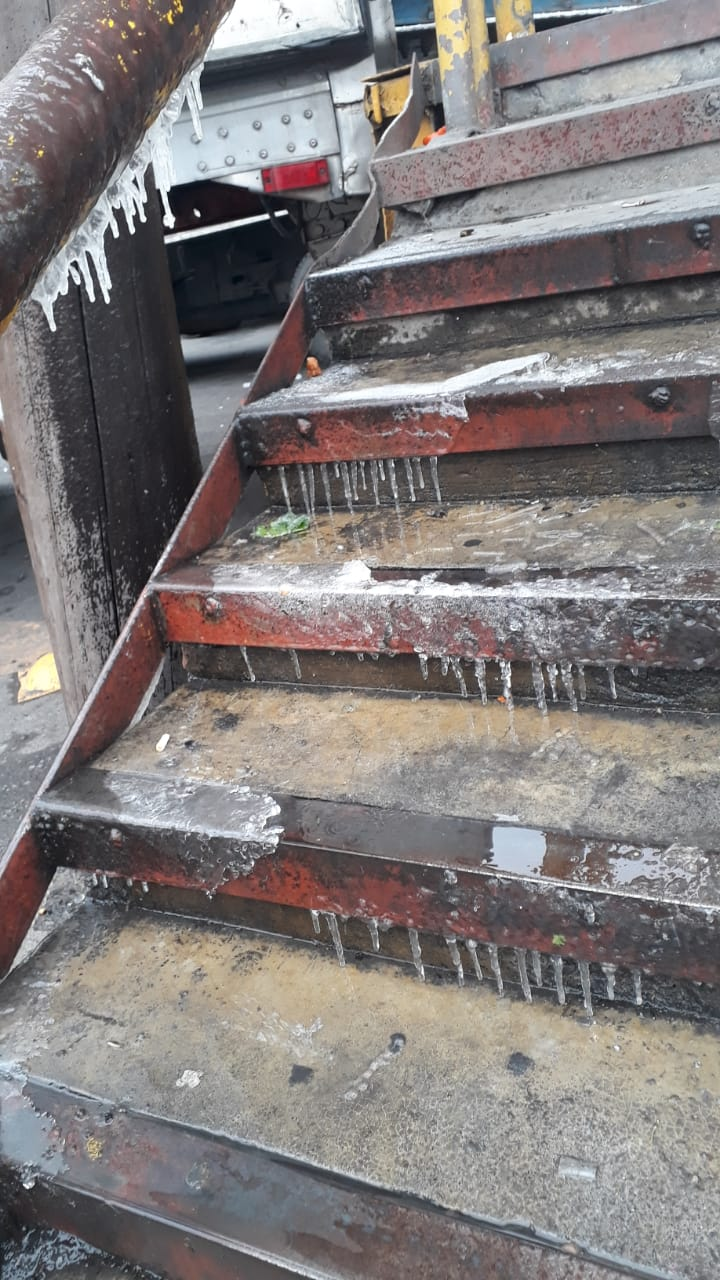
Icicles on stairs as a result of the freezing temperatures. It had rained the day before, 26 °F/−3 °C, Monterrey, Nuevo León, México.

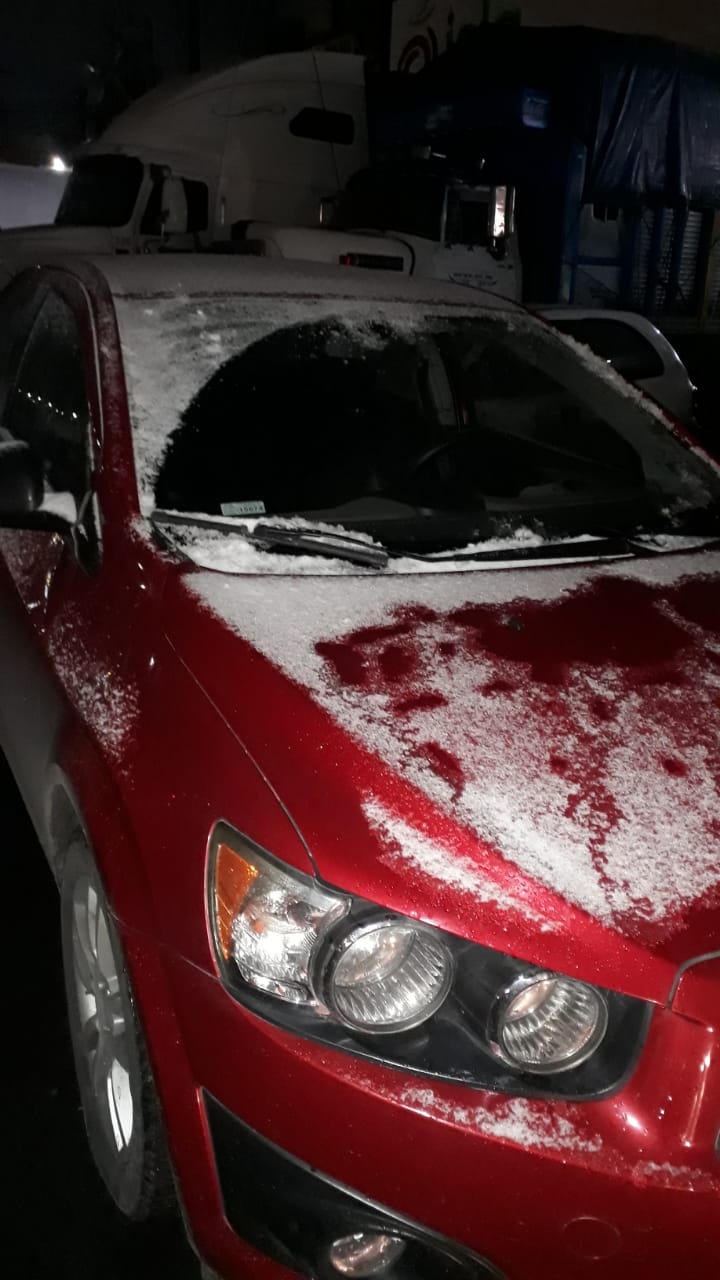
Car covered in snow in Monterrey, Nuevo León

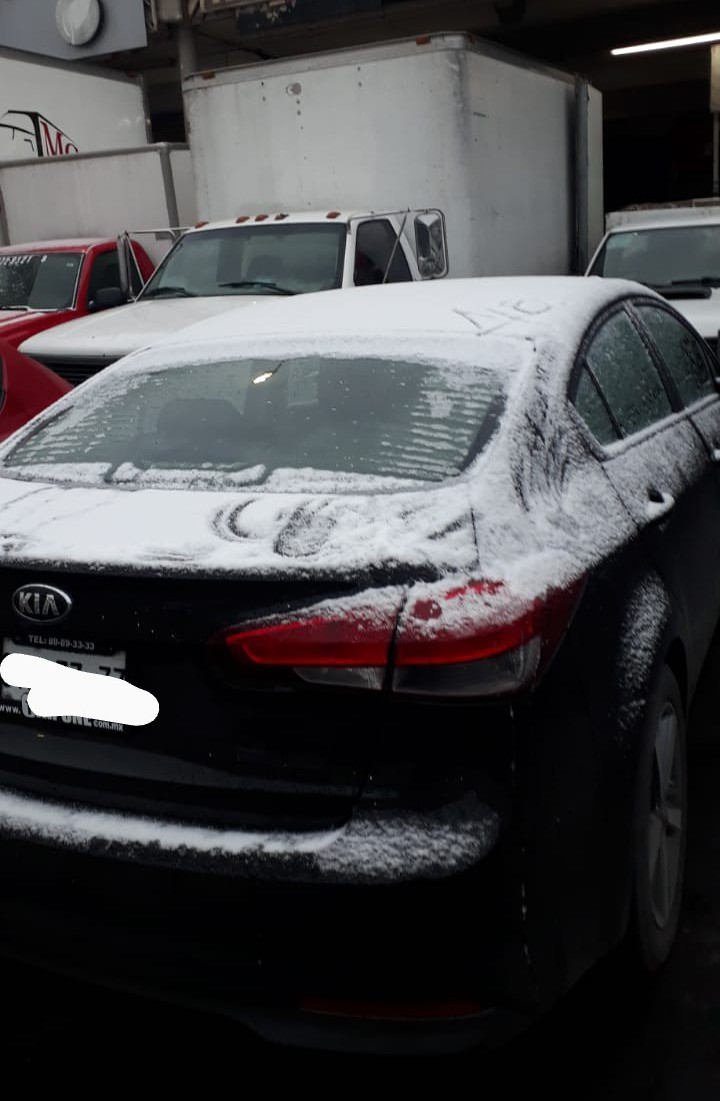
Car covered in snow in Monterrey, Nuevo León

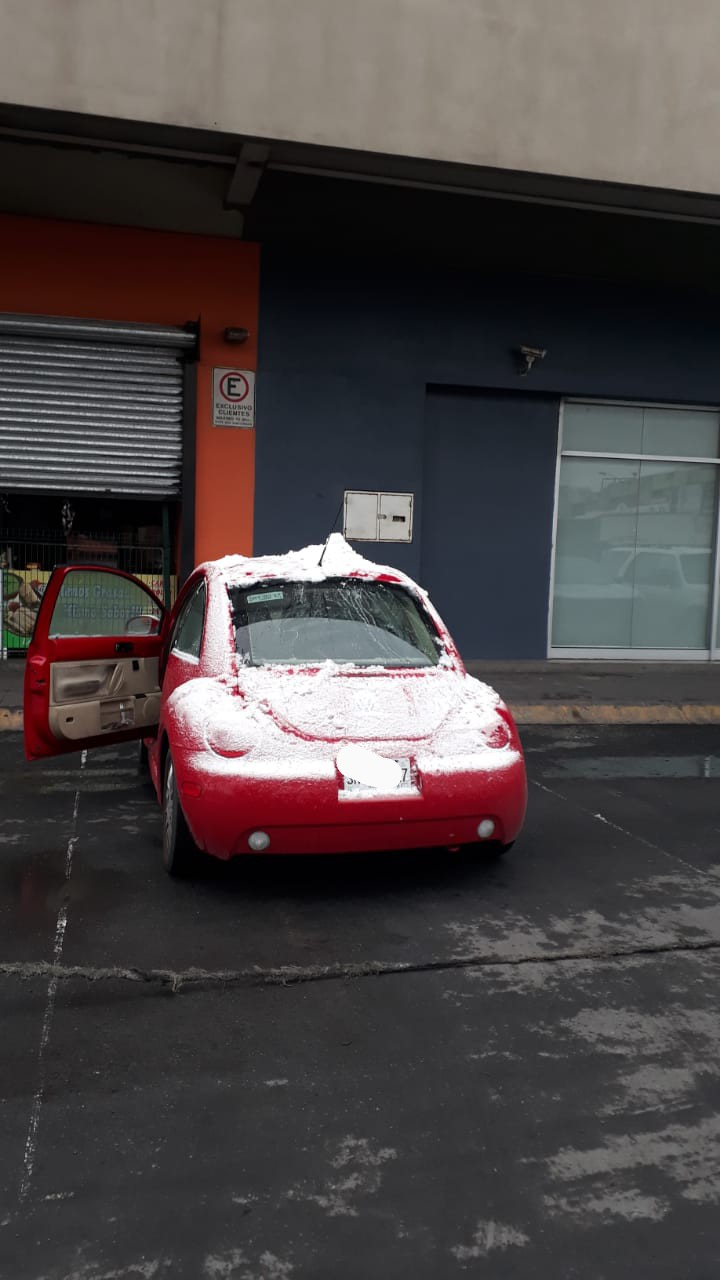
Car covered in Monterrey, Nuevo León

=== Canada ===
In Ontario, snowfall warnings were issued in advance of the winter storm. School bus service was cancelled across the Greater Toronto Area, and schools were completely closed in Halton and Durham. Twenty centimeters (7.9 in) of snow fell in Windsor, 12 cm (4.7 in) at Toronto Pearson International Airport and 18 cm (7.1 in) fell in Ottawa. The highest totals in the region were the over 30 cm (12 in) in and around the Hamilton and Niagara Region.

== Federal response ==
On February 19th, President Biden signed a major disaster declaration for the State of Texas, in response to a formal request submitted by Abbott the previous day. The declaration initially made individual assistance available to residents of 77 counties, with public assistance for emergency protective measures and Hazard Mitigation Grant Program funding made available statewide. The number of counties eligible for individual assistance was expanded in the weeks that followed as Texas Division of Emergency Management officials submitted additional damage data. By late February, 108 counties had been approved, and additional counties were added subsequently. Some rural counties were initially omitted from the individual assistance list because they lacked the capacity to submit timely damage assessments, a delay that drew criticism from state legislators and county officials.

The federal response included the shipment of more than one million meals and four million liters of water to Texas during the first week after the declaration, along with the use of United States Department of Defense fixed-wing aircraft to move bulk water to multiple locations in the state. The Supplemental Nutrition Assistance Program (SNAP) provided partial benefit replacements to recipients in 66 counties for food spoiled during the outages.

== Confirmed tornadoes ==
A severe weather outbreak struck the Southeastern United States on February 15, with large hail, damaging winds, and six tornadoes affecting five states. An EF2 tornado destroyed two homes and damaged trees near Damascus, Georgia, injuring five people. A more destructive high-end EF3 tornado struck the Ocean Ridge Plantation neighborhood near Sunset Beach, North Carolina, causing major damage to many homes, some of which were leveled or swept away, before moving into rural areas and damaging or snapping hundreds of trees. This tornado killed three and injured 10. Overall damage from the tornado outbreak totaled to at least $530,000.

Confirmed tornadoes by Enhanced Fujita rating
EFU	EF0	EF1	EF2	EF3	EF4	EF5	Total
0	4	0	1	1	0	0	6

=== February 15 event ===
List of confirmed tornadoes – Monday, February 15, 2021 (Note: All dates are based on the local time zone where the tornado touched down; however, all times are in Coordinated Universal Time for consistency.)
EF#	Location	County / Parish	State	Start Coord.	Time (UTC)	Path length	Max width
EF0	NW of Panama City Beach	Bay	FL	30.2211°N 85.8898°W	20:02–20:04	1.31 mi (2.11 km)	50 yd (46 m)
EF0	A high-end EF0 tornado caused minor damage to structures, poles, benches, and fencing occurred near the beach and at Frank Brown Park in Gulf Resort Beach.						
EF0	W of Compass Lake	Washington	FL	30.5994°N 85.4557°W	20:39–20:41	0.71 mi (1.14 km)	100 yd (91 m)
EF0	A brief high-end EF0 tornado pulled out an outbuilding anchored by wooden poles in shallow concrete, lofting it 20 yards (18 m). Several pine trees were snapped along a driveway. Further north, a double wide manufactured home had minor roof damage. Several other trees were uprooted along the path.						
EF0	WNW of Lake City	Columbia	FL	30.207°N 82.738°W	21:17–21:21	0.25 mi (0.40 km)	60 yd (55 m)
EF0	There was sporadic damage to trees, fences roofs and other damage to residential buildings. A fence panel was blown about 750 feet (230 m).						
EF0	ENE of Desser	Seminole	GA	30.89°N 84.82°W	21:29–21:30	0.5 mi (0.80 km)	50 yd (46 m)
EF0	Trees were blown down in a rural area. No structural damage was found, but a brief tornado debris signature appeared on radar.						
EF2	S of Damascus to E of Iveys Mill	Early, Baker	GA	31.281°N 84.7211°W	21:38–21:48	11.58 mi (18.64 km)	600 yd (550 m)
EF2	This strong tornado first touched down just west of SR 45, where it snapped several trees and damaged the roofs of some homes. Further northeast, the tornado reached its peak intensity as it completely destroyed two small and unanchored homes just south of Damascus, one made of concrete blocks, and the other made of wood with a concrete block foundation. Only scattered debris and the foundations remained of these structures, and a nearby detached garage was also completely destroyed. A truck was tossed from the garage, and cars were heavily damaged. Five injuries occurred at these homes. A third home sustained damage to its exterior and was shifted off its foundation. Trees were also snapped or uprooted, with two cases of metal poles being lodged into trees. A propane tank was dislodged and moved, and power lines went down. Farther northeast, the tornado weakened as it snapped and uprooted more trees. Some minor roofing damage occurred before the tornado lifted.						
EF3	N of Sunset Beach to SW of Delco	Brunswick	NC	33.9118°N 78.5096°W	04:34–05:02	21.9 mi (35.2 km)	275 yd (251 m)
EF3	3 deaths – See section on this tornado – 10 people were injured.						

==== Sunset Beach–Delco, North Carolina ====
Sunset Beach–Delco, North Carolina
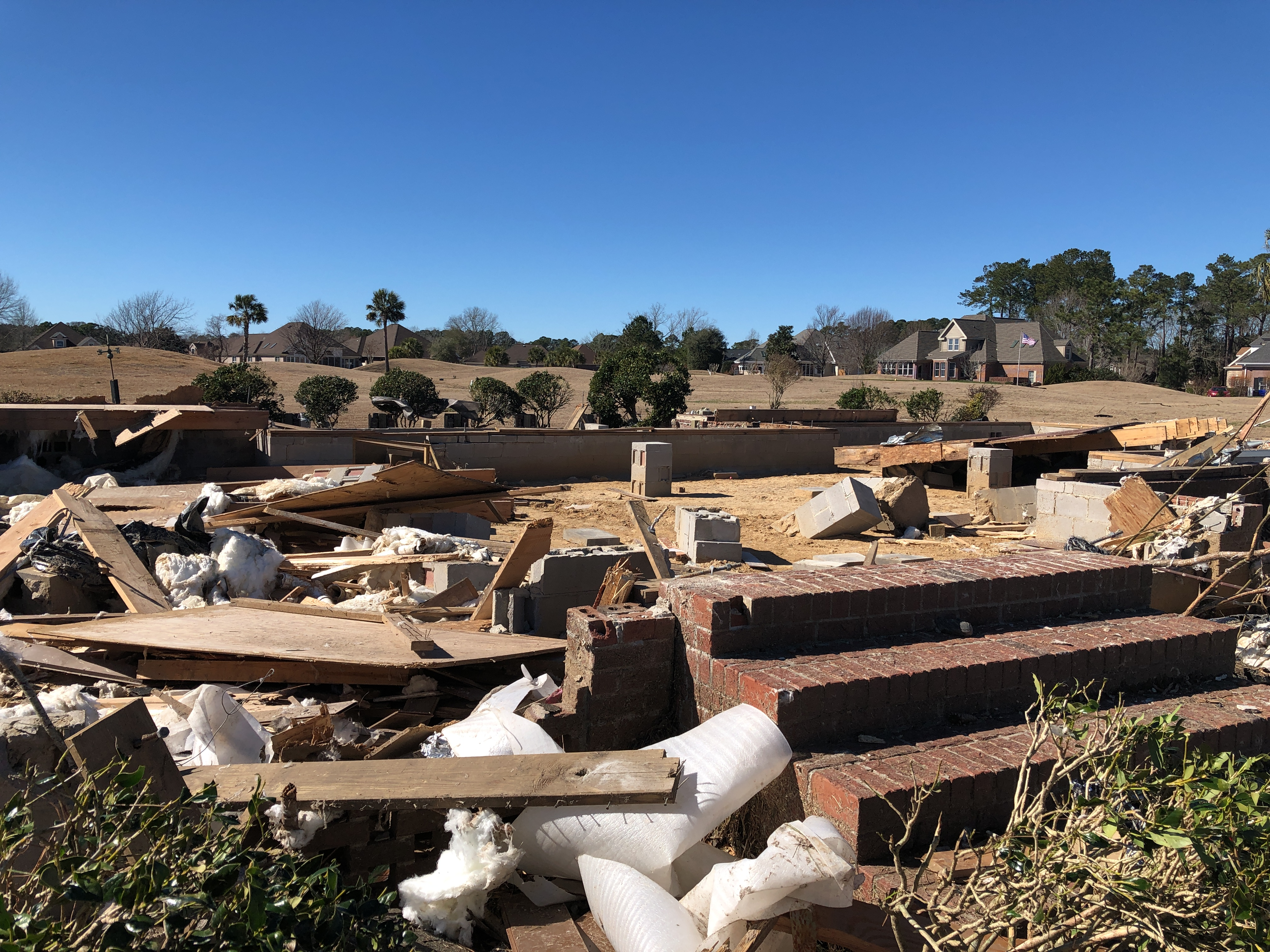
- EF3 damage to a home in Sunset Beach, NC where 2 fatalities occurred.

Meteorological history
- Formed: February 15, 2021, 11:34 p.m. EST (UTC−04:00)
- Dissipated: February 16, 2021, 12:02 a.m. EST (UTC−04:00)
- Duration: 28 minutes

EF3 tornado
- on the Enhanced Fujita scale
- Highest winds: 160 mph (260 km/h)

Overall effects
- Fatalities: 3
- Injuries: 10
- Power outages: 37,000

This destructive tornado touched down at the north edge of Sunset Beach, just north of the border with South Carolina, damaging numerous pine trees and limbs at EF0 intensity as it crossed NC 179, before rapidly intensifying to EF2 strength as it neared NC 904. A tornado warning was not issued until after the tornado touched down and began causing damage. As the tornado crossed the road, a large metal building was destroyed, and a number of RVs were overturned. Still rapidly strengthening, the tornado entered Grissettown and struck the Ocean Ridge Plantation subdivision at its peak intensity of high-end EF3. A community garden center and two homes were leveled at this location, one of which was swept completely away. This home was well constructed, but built on a block foundation, and vehicles parked at the site were moved only short distances. Dozens of other nearby homes were damaged, some of which sustained loss of roofs and exterior walls. Many large trees were snapped and denuded in the subdivision, and a car was overturned. All three fatalities occurred in the Ocean Ridge Plantation subdivision. The tornado then abruptly weakened but reached its maximum width as it crossed US 17 between Grissettown and Cool Run, as it exited Ocean Ridge Plantation at EF1 strength, rolling a double-wide mobile home on the north side of the highway. As the tornado continued northeast, it reintensified to EF2 strength, causing major damage to several homes and snapping hundreds of trees. It then inflicted a continuous path of tree damage through forest and swamp land, crossing NC 130 and NC 211. The tornado finally lifted east of NC 211.

The tornado was on the ground for 28 minutes, traveled 21.9 mi (35.2 km), and had peak width of 275 yd (251 m). The tornado caused three deaths, making it the sixth consecutive year with tornado fatalities in February and also making this tornado the deadliest single tornado in Southeastern North Carolina since an F3 touched down on November 16, 2006, and the first deadly tornado on record in Brunswick County. There were also ten injuries.

== Agricultural impact ==
Because the storm coincided with the end of the winter growing season and the start of calving and lambing season in Texas, it produced one of the most damaging agricultural events in state history. Estimates released in March 2021 placed agricultural losses at a minimum of $600 million.

The citrus industry, concentrated in the Rio Grande Valley counties of Cameron, Hidalgo, and Willacy, took the brunt of the economic hit. Estimated citrus losses totaled at least $230 million. Producers had already harvested around 80% of the orange crops and about 67% of grapefruit crops before the storm, but what remained of both crops was lost. Additionally, the around 200 acres of Lemon and lime orchards in Texas were almost completely destroyed. In a 2024 review, researchers reported that roughly 2,400 to 3,000 acres of the state's 24,000 acres of citrus were effectively lost, and production in the Lower Rio Grande Valley had recovered to only 60% of pre-storm levels three years after the event.

Vegetables in the region were also badly damaged, with the economic loss to the sector estimated at a minimum of $150 million. These included estimations of over $42 million in onion sales, over $27 million in leafy green sales, over $20 million in watermelon sales, and more than $15 million in cabbage sales. It was also estimated that at least another $42 million in additional vegetable and herb sales losses for these large vegetable crop-producing areas. Sugar cane saw extreme damage as well, with almost all of the cane plants being destroyed by the storm.

Livestock losses across the state were estimated at $228 million. The figure included deaths among beef and dairy cattle, sheep, goats, and poultry, as well as increased feed and fuel costs, damage to housing and milking infrastructure, and losses from milk that had to be dumped because tanker trucks could not reach processing plants. Many newborn animals did not survive. Texas Agriculture Commissioner Sid Miller reported that some dairy operations lost as much as $8 million per day during the worst of the storm.

== Aftermath ==
The storm was shortly followed by another major winter storm a few days later, which caused at least an additional 29 fatalities and US$2 billion in damage, worsening the 2021 Texas power crisis and hampering recovery efforts in the state.

On June 14, 2024, the Supreme Court of Texas ruled on a case regarding the incident, holding that the Public Utility Commission of Texas acted within its authority as a state agency in taking emergency measures that raised the price of electricity, and was therefore immune from suit. In an April 2024 ruling by the Fourteenth Court of Appeals in Texas, a three-judge panel in Houston granted defendants known as transmission and distribution utilities (TDUs) dismissals of some causes of action filed by homeowners and other plaintiffs, but ruled that plaintiffs' claims for gross negligence and intentional misconduct could move forward. The TDU defendants include CenterPoint Energy, Oncor Electric Delivery, and American Electric Power.

== See also ==
- 2011 Groundhog Day blizzard
- December 2014 North American storm complex
- 2020–21 North American winter
- February 15–20, 2021 North American winter storm
- February 2022 North American winter storm
- List of major power outages
