= Museum of Coastal Carolina =

- Shown within North Carolina
- Established: May 25, 1991
- Location: 21 East Second Street, Ocean Isle Beach, North Carolina
- Coordinates: 33.889108°N 78.434913°W
- Type: Natural History Museum
- Directors: Terry Bryant, Executive Director, Ocean Isle Museum Foundation, Inc.
- Website: http://www.museumplanetarium.org

The Museum of Coastal Carolina is a natural history museum located at Ocean Isle Beach in Brunswick County, North Carolina. Animal exhibits include an aquarium and a touch tank with live sea animals, shells, fossils, insects, a display about sharks, live snakes, bird dioramas and an ocean reef diorama that includes life-sized models of whales, sharks, sea turtles and rays. Other exhibits include river basins, the effects of storm water runoff and beach litter on the water's ecology, barrier islands and tides. The museum also includes displays of local and maritime history, including shipbuilding and area Native Americans.

The museum offers afternoon and evening programs and special lectures, including area efforts to protect sea turtles.

The Board of Trustees of the Ocean Isle Museum Foundation, Inc. is the governing body of the Ingram Planetarium, located 4 miles away in Sunset Beach, North Carolina, as well as the Museum of Coastal Carolina.
