= Bird Island, North Carolina =

Island in North Carolina and South Carolina, United States

Coordinates: 33°51′26″N 78°32′19″W

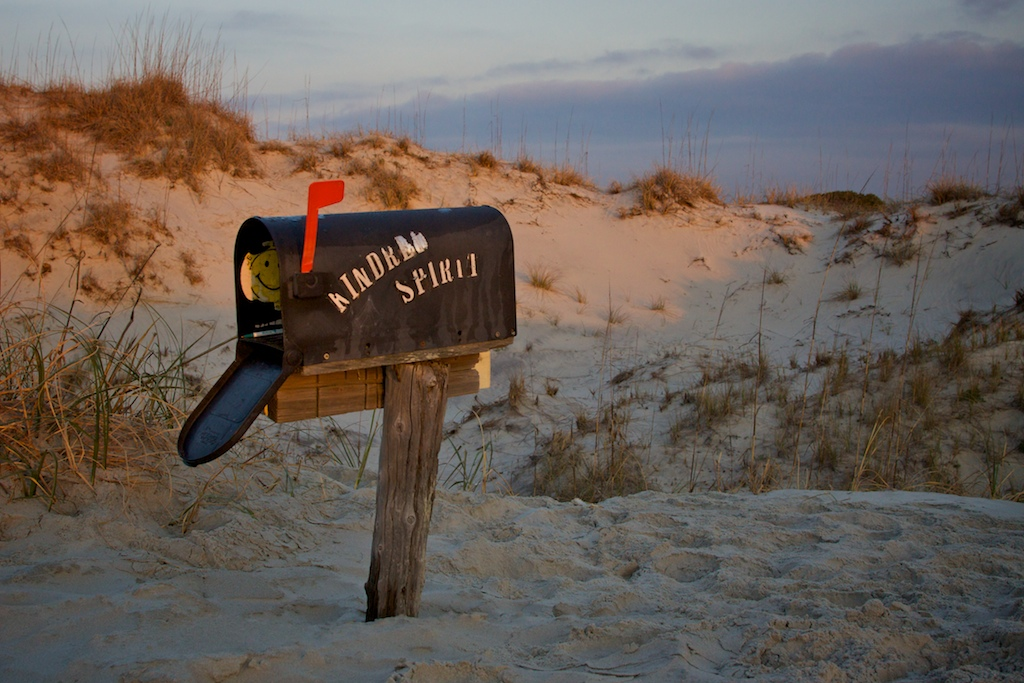
The "Kindred Spirit" mailbox on Bird Island, North Carolina. Hikers can leave their thoughts on notepads inside the mailbox after their trek.

Bird Island is approximately 1,300 acres (5.3 km^{2}) adjacent to the town of Sunset Beach, North Carolina, US. Sunset Beach is on a barrier island and is the southernmost town in North Carolina. Bird Island can be reached by walking along the seashore toward the South Carolina border. Due to the contour of the Atlantic Coast at this point, the direction of travel to Bird Island is approximately West-Southwest. Previously, Bird Island was separated from Sunset Beach by a tidal creek (Mad Inlet) that could be easily crossed only at low tide. Accretion of ocean sand (due to hurricane activity in the 1990s as well as environmental activity to fill in dune grass) has gradually filled in the tidal creek so that two separate islands became one.

== Preservation ==
Bird Island was privately owned prior to 2002. The shoreline, dunes, and marshland of Bird Island provide important habitat and nesting for species that are endangered, threatened, or of special concern, including the Kemp's ridley and loggerhead sea turtles. Although there was no vehicular access to this land, there was the threat that the land might some day be developed. The state of North Carolina, under Governor Mike Easley and DEQ Secretary Bill Ross used $4.2 million of public and private funding to purchase the land and create a coastal reserve, administered by the North Carolina Division of Coastal Management.
