= Calabash, North Carolina =

- Town
- Seal
- Nickname: Seafood Capital of the World
- Location within the state of North Carolina Calabash (the United States)
- Coordinates: 33°53′43″N 78°33′05″W
- Country: United States
- State: North Carolina
- County: Brunswick

Government
  - Mayor: Donna P. Long

Area
  - Total: 4.87 sq mi (12.62 km^{2})
  - Land: 4.53 sq mi (11.73 km^{2})
  - Water: 0.34 sq mi (0.88 km^{2})
- Elevation: 30 ft (9.1 m)

Population (2020)
  - Total: 2,011
  - Density: 444/sq mi (171.4/km^{2})
- Time zone: UTC-5 (Eastern (EST))
  - Summer (DST): UTC-4 (EDT)
- ZIP code: 28467
- Area codes: 910, 472
- FIPS code: 37-09540
- GNIS feature ID: 2405358
- Website: www.townofcalabash.net

Calabash is a small town in Brunswick County, North Carolina, United States. As of the 2020 census, the population of the town was 2,011. It is known as the "Seafood Capital of the World" because of the town's seafood restaurants.

== History ==
Calabash was named after the gourds that grew in the region, which were used for drinking well water. Since the 1930s, Calabash has been known for its distinctive style of fried fish, which has come to be known as "Calabash Style." The New York Times reported in 1983 that Calabash had 32 restaurants and about 180 residents. 40 years later, the number of restaurants was about the same but the town had around 2,000 residents. Calabash style buffets are common in many eastern Carolina coastal towns. Myrtle Beach, South Carolina, is home to a large number of these restaurants, as the city is just 25 miles (40 km) from Calabash.

In 1998, a large portion of the town of Calabash split to form the town of Carolina Shores. The split came as the result of years of bickering over "garbage collection and sign restrictions". The town limits of Carolina Shores now borders on Calabash.

== Geography ==
Calabash is located in southwestern Brunswick County and its southwest border is the South Carolina state line. It is bordered to the northwest by the town of Carolina Shores, and the town of Sunset Beach lies to the east. The tidal Calabash River flows through the southern part of the town, leading southwest to the Little River in South Carolina, 3 miles (5 km) upstream from that river's mouth at Little River Inlet on the Atlantic Ocean.

The main road through the town is North Carolina Highway 179 (Beach Drive), leading west to U.S. Route 17 in South Carolina and east by a winding route 15 miles (24 km) to Shallotte.

According to the United States Census Bureau, the town of Calabash has a total area of 3.7 square miles (9.5 km^{2}), of which 3.3 square miles (8.6 km^{2}) is land and 0.35 square miles (0.9 km^{2}), or 9.27%, is water.

== Demographics ==
Historical population
Census	Pop.	Note	%±
1980	128		—
1990	1,210		845.3%
2000	711		−41.2%
2010	1,786		151.2%
2020	2,011		12.6%
2023 (est.)	2,433	▲	21.0%
U.S. Decennial Census

Calabash is part of the Wilmington Metropolitan Statistical Area.

=== 2020 census ===
As of the 2020 census, Calabash had a population of 2,011. The median age was 56.4 years. 12.9% of residents were under the age of 18 and 32.9% of residents were 65 years of age or older. For every 100 females there were 90.4 males, and for every 100 females age 18 and over there were 91.3 males age 18 and over.

97.2% of residents lived in urban areas, while 2.8% lived in rural areas.

There were 992 households in Calabash, of which 14.4% had children under the age of 18 living in them. Of all households, 40.7% were married-couple households, 22.2% were households with a male householder and no spouse or partner present, and 30.2% were households with a female householder and no spouse or partner present. About 38.8% of all households were made up of individuals and 22.2% had someone living alone who was 65 years of age or older.

There were 1,546 housing units, of which 35.8% were vacant. The homeowner vacancy rate was 2.8% and the rental vacancy rate was 18.7%.

Calabash racial composition
Race	Number	Percentage
White (non-Hispanic)	1,621	80.61%
Black or African American (non-Hispanic)	70	3.48%
Native American	19	0.94%
Asian	11	0.55%
Other/Mixed	91	4.53%
Hispanic or Latino	199	9.9%

=== 2000 census ===
As of the census of 2000, there were 711 people, 377 households, and 232 families residing in the town. The population density was 501.5 inhabitants per square mile (193.6/km^{2}). There were 508 housing units at an average density of 358.3 per square mile (138.3/km^{2}). The racial makeup of the town was 93.25% White, 3.66% African American, 0.14% Asian, 2.25% from other races, and 0.70% from two or more races. Hispanic or Latino of any race were 3.66% of the population.

There were 377 households, out of which 11.4% had children under the age of 18 living with them, 52.5% were married couples living together, 6.4% had a female householder with no husband present, and 38.2% were non-traditional families (needs definition). 34.2% of all households were made up of individuals, and 16.7% had someone living alone who was 65 years of age or older. The average household size was 1.89 and the average family size was 2.32.

In the town, the population was spread out, with 9.7% under the age of 18, 4.5% from 18 to 24, 19.4% from 25 to 44, 29.7% from 45 to 64, and 36.7% who were 65 years of age or older. The median age was 58 years. For every 100 females, there were 93.2 males. For every 100 females age 18 and over, there were 94.5 males.

The median income for a household in the town was $32,946, and the median income for a family was $38,403. Males had a median income of $27,202 versus $25,368 for females. The per capita income for the town was $22,975. About 5.4% of families and 9.3% of the population were below the poverty line, including 11.8% of those under age 18 and 1.3% of those age 65 or over.

== Government ==
The Town Hall is currently located at 882 Persimmon Road SW.

== Infrastructure ==
The town's emergency services serve the communities of Calabash, Sunset Beach, and Carolina Shores.

== In popular culture ==
Jimmy Durante, comedian and host of radio and television programs from 1947 to 1970, signed off each episode with his familiar national catchphrase: "Good night, Mrs. Calabash, wherever you are." Durante revealed in 1966 that this was a tribute to his first wife, Jean, who had died in 1943: While driving across the country, the couple stopped and stayed in Calabash, whose name Jean had loved. "Mrs. Calabash" became his pet name for her.
