= Carolina Shores, North Carolina =

- Town
- Seal

- Location within the state of North Carolina
- Coordinates: 33°54′32″N 78°34′28″W
- Country: United States
- State: North Carolina
- County: Brunswick

Government
  - Mayor: Joyce Dunn

Area
  - Total: 2.88 sq mi (7.45 km^{2})
  - Land: 2.87 sq mi (7.44 km^{2})
  - Water: 0.0077 sq mi (0.02 km^{2})
- Elevation: 39 ft (12 m)

Population (2020)
  - Total: 4,588
  - Density: 1,597.7/sq mi (616.86/km^{2})
- Time zone: UTC-5 (Eastern (EST))
  - Summer (DST): UTC-4 (EDT)
- ZIP code: 28467
- Area codes: 910, 472
- FIPS code: 37-10550
- GNIS feature ID: 2405382
- Website: www.townofcarolinashores.com

Carolina Shores is a town in Brunswick County, North Carolina, United States. As of the 2020 census, Carolina Shores had a population of 4,588. It is part of the Wilmington, NC Metropolitan Statistical Area.

The town was incorporated in 1998 after a split from the town of Calabash, which came as the result of years of disagreement over "sewer, garbage collection and sign restrictions". The town limits of Carolina Shores currently interlock with those of Calabash. Sharing the name of the local country club, "Carolina Shores" could be considered a misnomer since the town does not have a "shore" with any large body of water.

== Geography ==
Carolina Shores is located in southwestern Brunswick County. Its southwestern border is the South Carolina state line; the town of Calabash borders Carolina Shores to the south. U.S. Route 17 (Ocean Highway) forms the northwestern border of the town; the highway leads 47 miles (76 km) northeast to Wilmington and 24 miles (39 km) southwest to Myrtle Beach, South Carolina.

According to the United States Census Bureau, Carolina Shores has a total area of 2.5 square miles (6.6 km^{2}), of which 0.004 square miles (0.01 km^{2}), or 0.17%, is water.

== Demographics ==
Historical population
Census	Pop.	Note	%±
2000	1,482		—
2010	3,048		105.7%
2020	4,588		50.5%
U.S. Decennial Census

=== 2020 census ===
Carolina Shores racial composition
Race	Number	Percentage
White (non-Hispanic)	4,196	91.46%
Black or African American (non-Hispanic)	93	2.03%
Native American	11	0.24%
Asian	26	0.57%
Pacific Islander	1	0.02%
Other/Mixed	138	3.01%
Hispanic or Latino	123	2.68%

As of the 2020 census, Carolina Shores had a population of 4,588. The median age was 66.0 years. 7.4% of residents were under the age of 18 and 53.5% of residents were 65 years of age or older. For every 100 females, there were 85.4 males, and for every 100 females age 18 and over there were 84.3 males age 18 and over.

100.0% of residents lived in urban areas, while 0.0% lived in rural areas.

There were 2,331 households in Carolina Shores, of which 9.4% had children under the age of 18 living in them. Of all households, 57.7% were married-couple households, 12.1% were households with a male householder and no spouse or partner present, and 25.1% were households with a female householder and no spouse or partner present. About 28.3% of all households were made up of individuals and 20.7% had someone living alone who was 65 years of age or older.

There were 2,767 housing units, of which 15.8% were vacant. The homeowner vacancy rate was 2.5% and the rental vacancy rate was 2.6%.

=== 2000 census ===
As of the census of 2000, there were 1,482 people, 766 households, and 593 families residing in the town. The population density was 1,073.8 inhabitants per square mile (414.6/km^{2}). There were 838 housing units at an average density of 607.2 per square mile (234.4/km^{2}). The racial makeup of the town was 99.33% White, 0.40% African American, 0.27% from other races. Hispanic or Latino of any race were 0.54% of the population.

There were 766 households, out of which 4.0% had children under the age of 18 living with them, 74.5% were married couples living together, 2.0% had a female householder with no husband present, and 22.5% were non-families. 20.5% of all households were made up of individuals, and 14.9% had someone living alone who was 65 years of age or older. The average household size was 1.93 and the average family size was 2.17.

In the town, the population was spread out, with 3.9% under the age of 18, 1.6% from 18 to 24, 6.0% from 25 to 44, 29.4% from 45 to 64, and 59.1% who were 65 years of age or older. The median age was 68 years. For every 100 females, there were 90.7 males. For every 100 females age 18 and over, there were 88.1 males.

The median income for a household in the town was $43,933, and the median income for a family was $48,527. Males had a median income of $34,167 versus $24,250 for females. The per capita income for the town was $27,093. About 2.8% of families and 4.9% of the population were below the poverty line, including 18.8% of those under age 18 and 1.2% of those age 65 or over.
