= Ocean Isle Beach, North Carolina =

Ocean Isle Beach
- Town
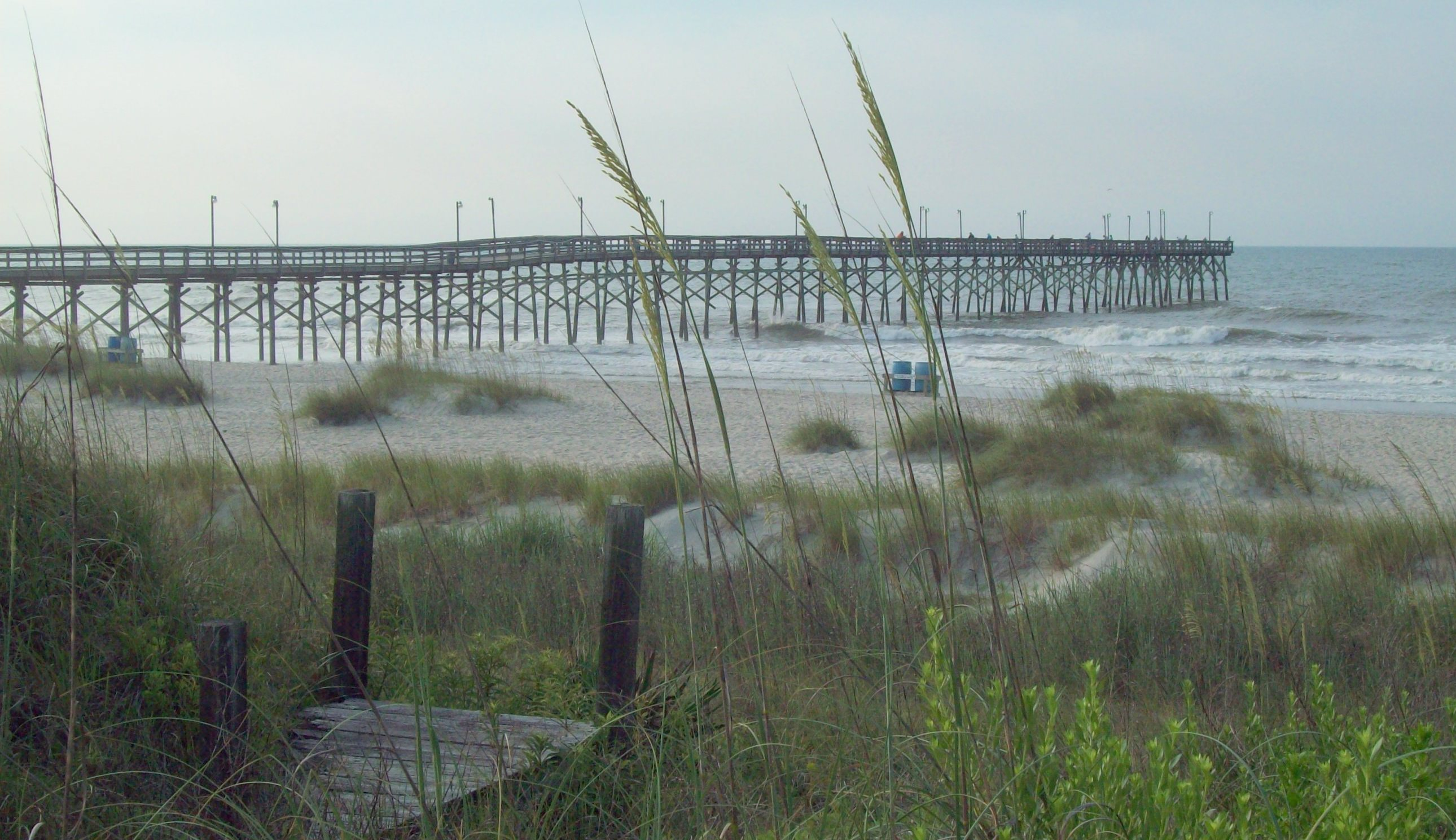
- Ocean Isle Beach Fishing Pier

- Seal
- Motto: "Unchanged"
- Location within the state of North Carolina
- Coordinates: 33°53′35″N 78°25′53″W
- Country: United States
- State: North Carolina
- County: Brunswick
- Township: Shallotte Township

Area
  - Total: 4.72 sq mi (12.22 km^{2})
  - Land: 3.74 sq mi (9.69 km^{2})
  - Water: 0.98 sq mi (2.53 km^{2})
- Elevation: 0 ft (0 m)

Population (2020)
  - Total: 867
  - Density: 231.7/sq mi (89.47/km^{2})
- Time zone: UTC-5 (Eastern (EST))
  - Summer (DST): UTC-4 (EDT)
- ZIP code: 28469
- Area codes: 910, 472
- FIPS code: 37-48700
- GNIS feature ID: 2407032
- Website: www.oibgov.com

Ocean Isle Beach (or simply Ocean Isle, or OIB) is a small seaside town in Brunswick County, North Carolina, United States. It was incorporated as a town in 1959 and is part of the Wilmington, NC Metropolitan Statistical Area. The population was 867 at the 2020 census. Located at the southern end of North Carolina's Atlantic coastline, along the Atlantic Intracoastal Waterway, Ocean Isle Beach has private homes, seasonal rentals, and tourist attractions.

== History ==
Ocean Isle Beach completed a roundabout located at North Carolina Highway 179. This design includes a brick retaining wall with "Welcome to Ocean Isle Beach" along with three bronze statues of children playing with kites.

The American Shore and Beach Preservation Association named Ocean Isle Beach the winner of its 2008 Best Restored Beach Award. Ocean Isle Beach's quest for a federal beach restoration program began after Hurricane Hugo devastated the area in 1989. The town lobbied members of Congress for federal funding and opened a capital reserve savings account to provide the local share of funding necessary for restoration. Coastal engineers began the project in 2001 and provided high-quality sand for the beach and created a deeper channel for boaters. Judging for the award was based on three criteria: the economic and ecological benefits the beach brings to its community; the short and long-term success of the restoration project; and the challenges each community overcame during the course of the project.

== Geography ==
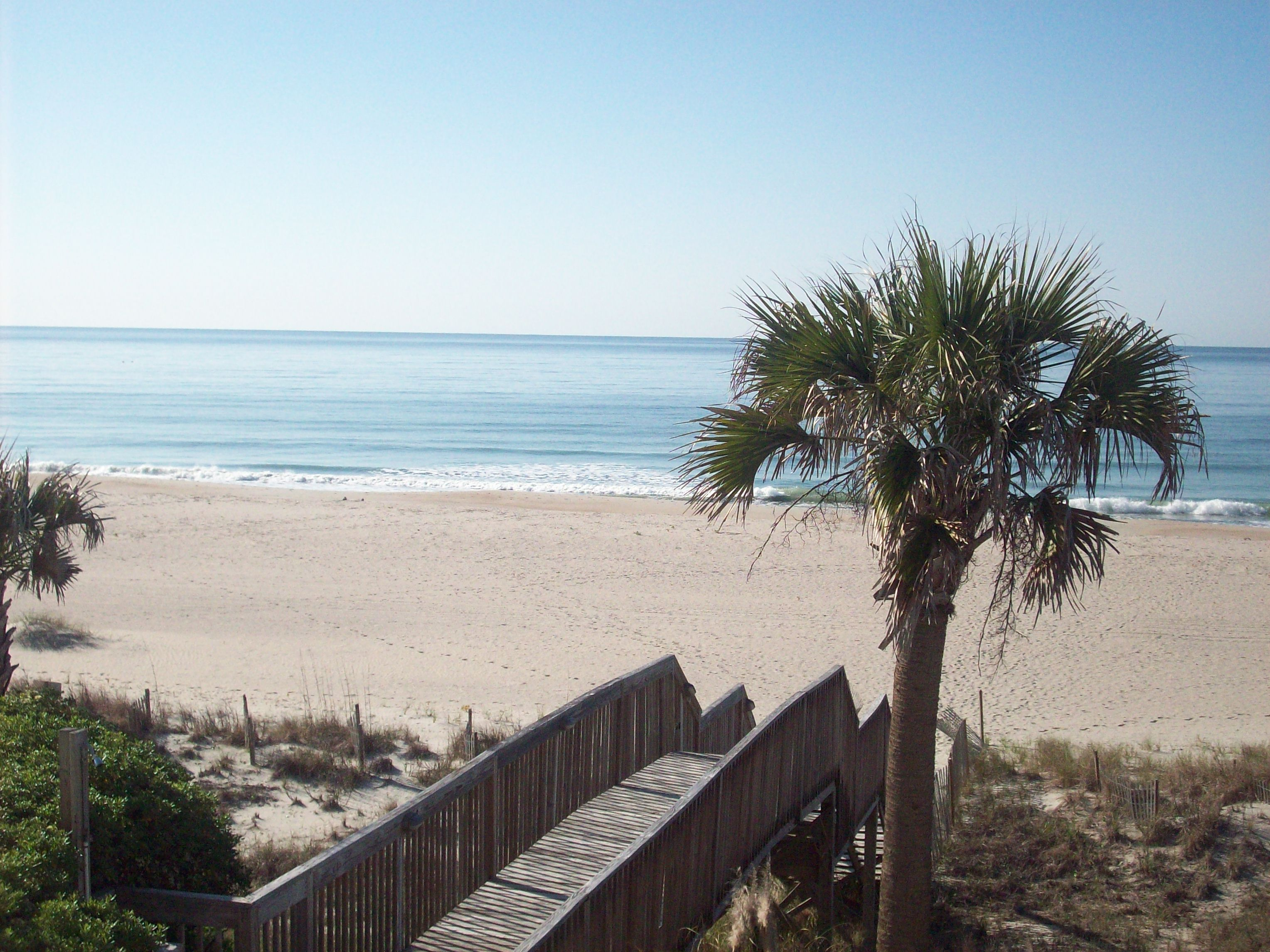
View of the Atlantic Ocean from Ocean Isle Beach

Ocean Isle Beach is located in southwest Brunswick County. The town spans the barrier island of Ocean Isle Beach, extending 5 miles (8 km) from Tubbs Inlet on the west to Shallotte Inlet on the east, and a section of the mainland to the north along North Carolina Highway 904.

According to the United States Census Bureau, the town has a total area of 4.5 square miles (11.7 km^{2}); 3.4 square miles (8.8 km^{2}) is land (74.79%) and the balance water.

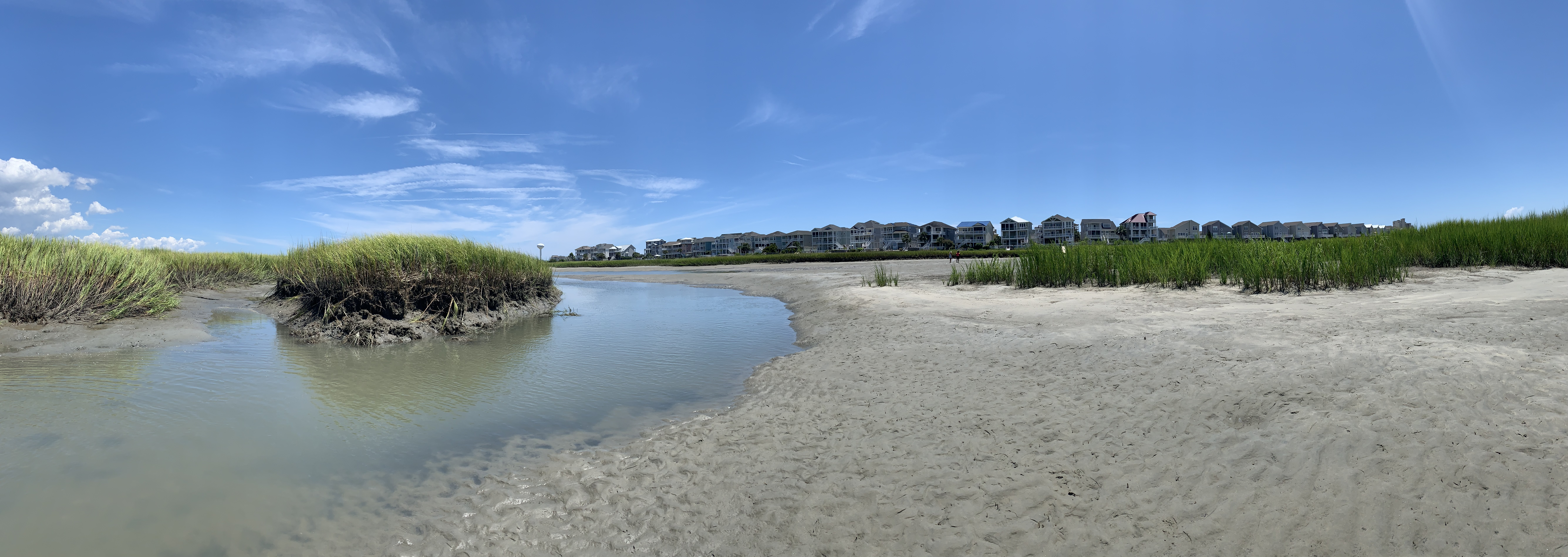
The quiet sound in Western Ocean Isle during low tide, taken by a panoramic camera view.

=== Weather ===
Weather in Ocean Isle tends to be warm but varied, with the temperature averaging around 88F (31C) during the Summer of 2021, and 58F (14C) during the Winter of 2020. Rainfall is normal during the end of the Summer, and lightning storms are frequent. Hurricanes are also common and have been known to cause fires. In 1989, Hurricane Hugo devastated the area. In 2020, Hurricane Isaias made landfall near Ocean Isle Beach, as high end Category 1, causing significant damage to waterfront properties and the fishing pier.

== Demographics ==
Historical population
Census	Pop.	Note	%±
1960	5		—
1970	78		1,460.0%
1980	143		83.3%
1990	523		265.7%
2000	426		−18.5%
2010	550		29.1%
2020	867		57.6%
U.S. Decennial Census

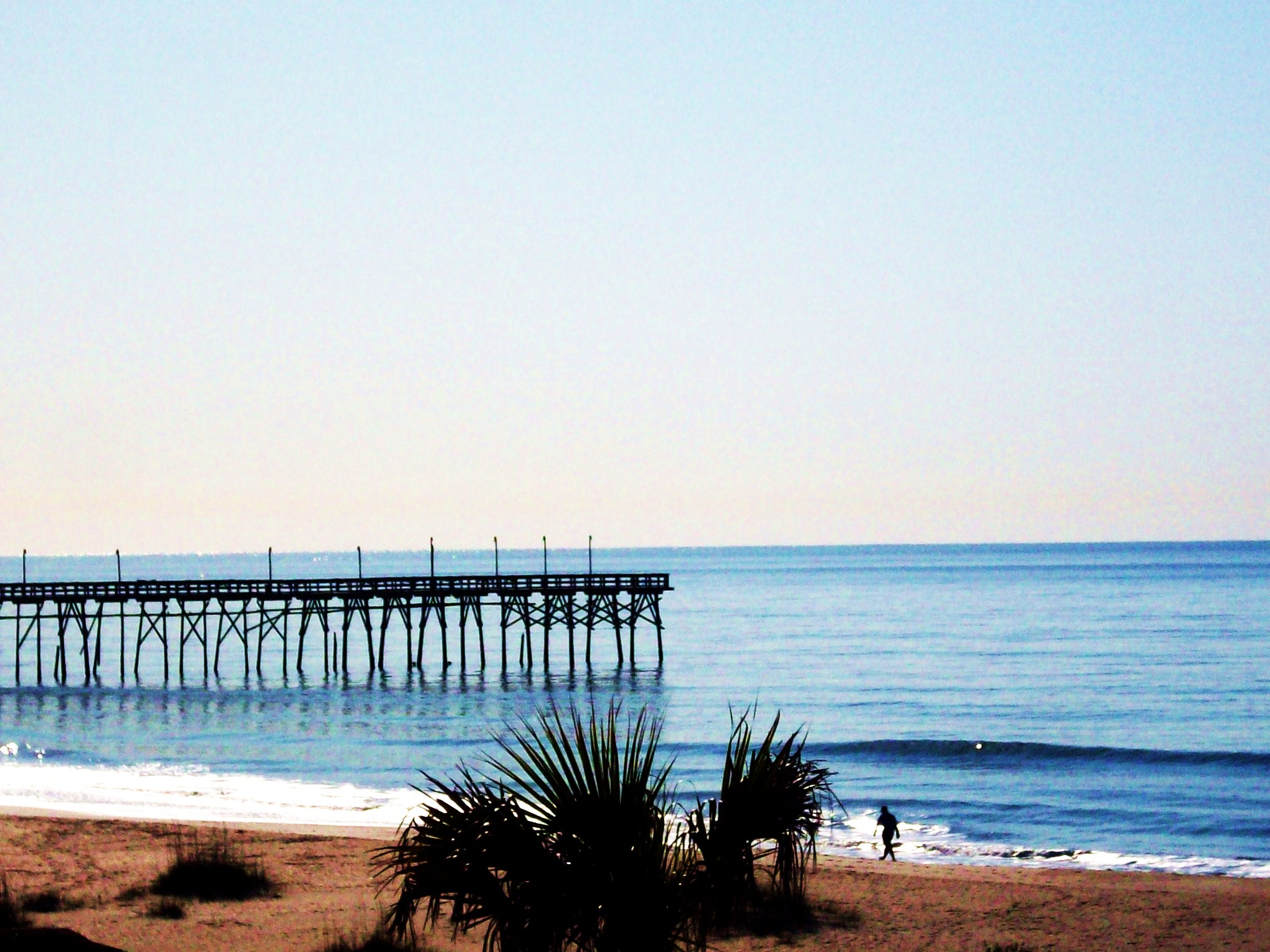
Ocean Isle Pier

=== 2020 census ===
Ocean Isle Beach racial composition
Race	Number	Percentage
White (non-Hispanic)	822	94.81%
Native American	3	0.35%
Asian	6	0.69%
Pacific Islander	1	0.12%
Other/Mixed	20	2.31%
Hispanic or Latino	15	1.73%

As of the 2020 United States census, there were 867 people, 374 households, and 289 families residing in the town.

According to the 2019–2023 American Community Survey, the estimated population was 796, with a median age of 67.9 years.

=== 2000 census ===
As of the census of 2000, there were 426 people, 209 households, and 141 families residing in the town. The population density was 124.2 inhabitants per square mile (48.0/km^{2}). There were 2,507 housing units at an average density of 731.0 per square mile (282.2/km^{2}). The racial makeup of the town was 98.59% White, 0.94% Native American and 0.47% Asian. Hispanic or Latino of any race were 0.47% of the population.

There were 209 households, out of which 11.5% had children under the age of 18 living with them, 62.7% were married couples living together, 2.4% had a female householder with no husband present, and 32.5% were non-families. 25.4% of all households were made up of individuals, and 5.3% had someone living alone who was 65 years of age or older. The average household size was 2.04 and the average family size was 2.40.

In the town, the population was spread out, with 10.3% under the age of 18, 5.4% from 18 to 24, 17.8% from 25 to 44, 45.3% from 45 to 64, and 21.1% who were 65 years of age or older. The median age was 53 years. For every 100 females, there were 99.1 males. For every 100 females age 18 and over, there were 97.9 males.

The median income for a household in the town was $67,639, and the median income for a family was $65,625. Males had a median income of $37,188 versus $22,188 for females. The per capita income for the town was $42,605. About 3.5% of families and 4.1% of the population were below the poverty line, including none of those under age 18 and 5.9% of those age 65 or over.

Population growth since 2000 has been driven primarily by in-migration of retirees and second-home owners rather than by natural increase, as the town records very low birth rates and a predominately older population.

== Arts and culture ==
Known as the "Gem of the Brunswick Islands", Ocean Isle Beach is located along the coastal corridor between Wilmington, North Carolina and Myrtle Beach, South Carolina. The beach runs east to west and offers a fishing pier, public boat launch facility, direct access to the Intracoastal Waterway, and beach paths every 500 feet (150 m). The Museum of Coastal Carolina offers dioramas on coastal life, a touch tank, a collection of Civil War and Native American artifacts, and a variety of interactive exhibits.

A popular myth in Ocean Isle beach are the mysterious lights which float over the ocean during the nighttime. It is unknown whether it is a drone, stars, or fishing boats. It has been reported to split apart into multiple lights before joining back together.

One of the eastern streets of Ocean Isle was, at one point, flooded and is now engulfed underwater. Pieces of the remaining asphalt from the street have washed up on the beaches. To defend against future flooding, sandbags have been installed under the stilted houses on "second street" and the beaches have been manually expanded. As of 2022, the beaches on the east side of the island have been heavily cleaned and restored.

== Parks and recreation ==
Brunswick County has completed a new 58-acre (23 ha) recreational park on the mainland. The park offers a variety of amenities, such as an amphitheater, festival grounds, ball parks, lighted tennis courts, and biking trails. This recreational park is located on Old Georgetown Road and is part of a $500,000 federal grant for parks throughout the county. Other projects scheduled is the Shallotte Blvd Recreation Area, which is a joint project between Ocean Isle Beach Land Conservancy and the Town of Ocean Isle Beach. The park will be at Shallotte Blvd and the ferry landing at the East end of the island. The recreation area will have a gazebo, picnic tables, a fishing pier, and a walkway with steps to the sand.

On the island of Ocean Isle Beach the town has recently finished a community area with an amphitheater, playground, small water area and bathrooms. Likewise. a children's play area and public gazebo are located on the eastern end of the island adjacent to the Intracoastal Waterway, along with a concert stage. The Town of Ocean Isle is also about to finish a new town Hall with administration office next to the Fire station.

Preceded by Holden Beach	Beaches of Southeastern North Carolina	Succeeded by Sunset Beach
