= Sunset Beach, North Carolina =

- Town
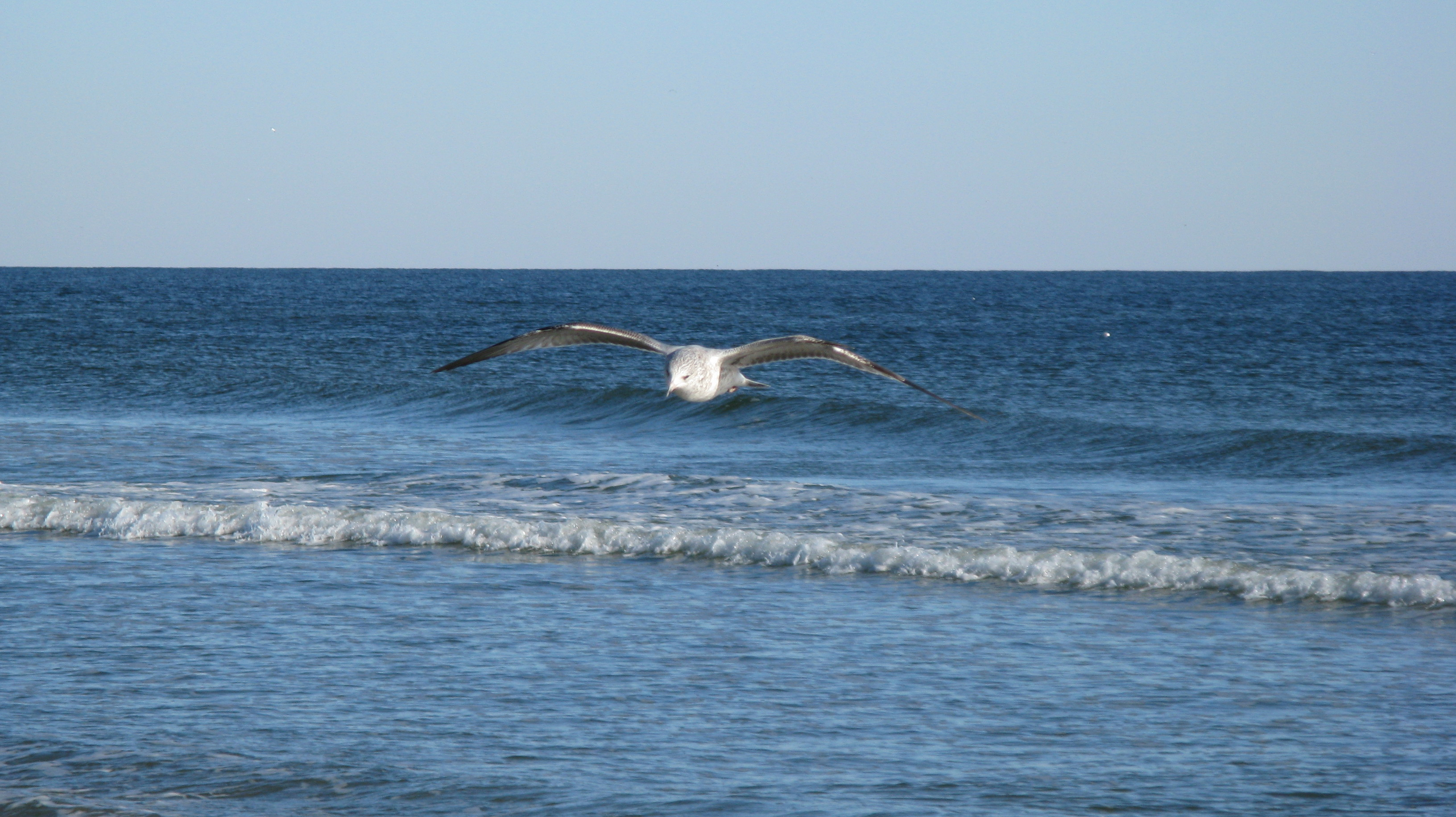
- Seagull over wave in Sunset Beach

- Flag Seal

- Location within the state of North Carolina
- Coordinates: 33°52′22″N 78°29′36″W
- Country: United States
- State: North Carolina
- County: Brunswick
- Township: Shallotte Township

Area
  - Total: 7.88 sq mi (20.42 km^{2})
  - Land: 6.97 sq mi (18.05 km^{2})
  - Water: 0.92 sq mi (2.37 km^{2})
- Elevation: 33 ft (10 m)

Population (2020)
  - Total: 4,175
  - Density: 599.1/sq mi (231.33/km^{2})
- Time zone: UTC-5 (Eastern (EST))
  - Summer (DST): UTC-4 (EDT)
- ZIP code: 28468
- Area codes: 910, 472
- FIPS code: 37-65900
- GNIS feature ID: 2406693
- Website: www.sunsetbeachnc.gov

Sunset Beach is a seaside town in Brunswick County, North Carolina, United States. The population was 3,572 at the 2010 census, up from 1,824 in 2000 census. It is part of the Wilmington, NC Metropolitan Statistical Area and the southernmost beach in the state.

== History ==
The seaside town of Sunset Beach got its start in 1955 when the land it occupies was bought by Mannon C. Gore. Impressed by the sunsets the southeast-facing island offered, he renamed 'Bald Beach,' as it had been called previously, to 'Sunset Beach.' Development began in earnest with the completion of a bridge connecting the beach island to the mainland in 1958, modeled by Gore and operated by him until 1961 when it was taken over by the North Carolina Department of Transportation. With the help of his son, Edward, Gore began selling property on the island in 1958. Additionally, Gore built the original pier on the island, named the 'Vesta Pier' for the beached civil war blockade-runner which sat beneath the structure, though is now completely covered by sand. Sunset Beach was later incorporated as a town in 1963.

On February 15, 2021, an EF3 tornado hit the north side of town around midnight, damaging multiple homes in several neighborhoods, including some that were completely destroyed. Three people were killed and 10 others were injured.

== Geography ==
Sunset Beach is located in southwestern Brunswick County. It is the last developed Atlantic Ocean beach before the South Carolina border. One-third of the town's area occupies a barrier island between the ocean and the Intracoastal Waterway; the remainder of the town extends onto the mainland to the north. Undeveloped Bird Island is directly to the west, Calabash is the closest town to the west on the mainland. Ocean Isle Beach is to the east, just past the easternmost point of Sunset Beach, Krause Point.

According to the United States Census Bureau, the town of Sunset Beach has a total area of 7.3 square miles (19.0 km^{2}), of which 6.4 square miles (16.7 km^{2}) is land, and 0.89 square miles (2.3 km^{2}) (12.22%) is water.

== Demographics ==
Historical population
Census	Pop.	Note	%±
1970	108		—
1980	304		181.5%
1990	311		2.3%
2000	1,824		486.5%
2010	3,572		95.8%
2020	4,175		16.9%
U.S. Decennial Census

=== 2020 census ===
As of the 2020 census, Sunset Beach had a population of 4,175. The median age was 68.0 years. 4.8% of residents were under the age of 18 and 60.1% of residents were 65 years of age or older. For every 100 females there were 85.6 males, and for every 100 females age 18 and over there were 85.3 males age 18 and over.

100.0% of residents lived in urban areas, while 0.0% lived in rural areas.

There were 2,276 households in Sunset Beach, of which 5.0% had children under the age of 18 living in them. Of all households, 60.1% were married-couple households, 12.3% were households with a male householder and no spouse or partner present, and 24.3% were households with a female householder and no spouse or partner present. About 32.2% of all households were made up of individuals and 23.1% had someone living alone who was 65 years of age or older.

There were 5,066 housing units, of which 55.1% were vacant. The homeowner vacancy rate was 2.1% and the rental vacancy rate was 56.5%.

Sunset Beach racial composition
Race	Number	Percentage
White (non-Hispanic)	3,935	94.25%
Black or African American (non-Hispanic)	26	0.62%
Native American	13	0.31%
Asian	34	0.81%
Pacific Islander	5	0.12%
Other/Mixed	66	1.58%
Hispanic or Latino	96	2.3%

=== 2000 census ===
As of the census of 2000, there were 1,824 people, 909 households, and 678 families residing in the town. The population density was 360.9 inhabitants per square mile (139.3/km^{2}). There were 2,983 housing units at an average density of 590.3 units per square mile (227.9 units/km^{2}). The racial makeup of the town was 97.37% White, 0.49% African American, 0.38% Native American, 0.38% Asian, 0.27% from other races, and 1.10% from two or more races. Hispanic or Latino of any race were 1.37% of the population.

There were 909 households, out of which 7.6% had children under the age of 18 living with them, 70.0% were married couples living together, 3.3% had a female householder with no husband present, and 25.4% were non-families. 21.3% of all households were made up of individuals, and 9.2% had someone living alone who was 65 years of age or older. The average household size was 2.01 and the average family size was 2.28.

In the town, the population was spread out, with 6.9% under the age of 18, 2.7% from 18 to 24, 12.1% from 25 to 44, 43.6% from 45 to 64, and 34.7% who were 65 years of age or older. The median age was 60 years. For every 100 females, there were 97.2 males. For every 100 females age 18 and over, there were 95.2 males.

The median income for a household in the town was $47,356, and the median income for a family was $57,019. Males had a median income of $40,795 versus $27,708 for females. The per capita income for the town was $36,181. About 3.0% of families and 4.2% of the population were below the poverty line, including 3.5% of those under age 18 and 3.2% of those age 65 or over.

== Sunset Beach Bridge ==
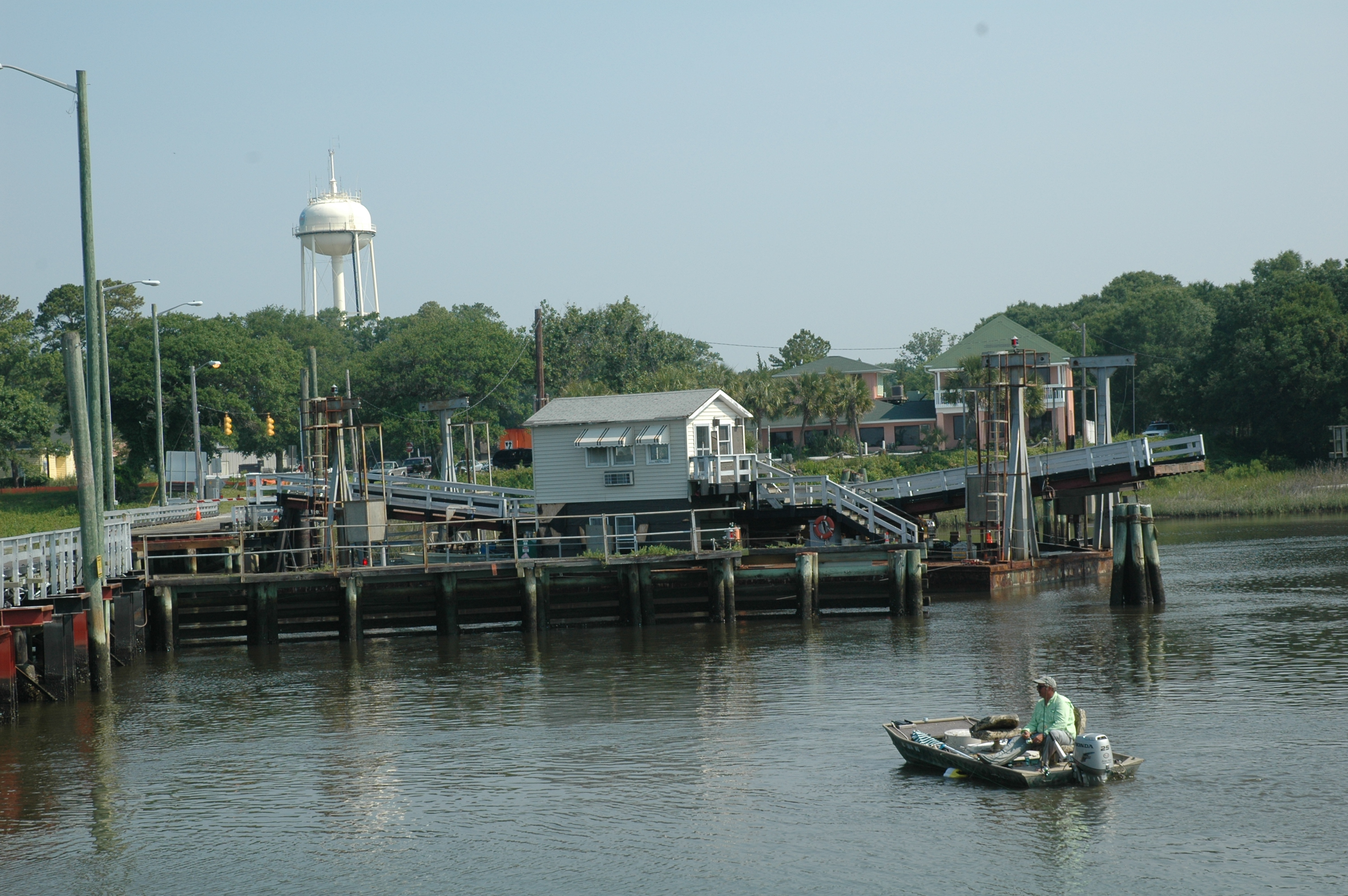
Sunset beach bridge

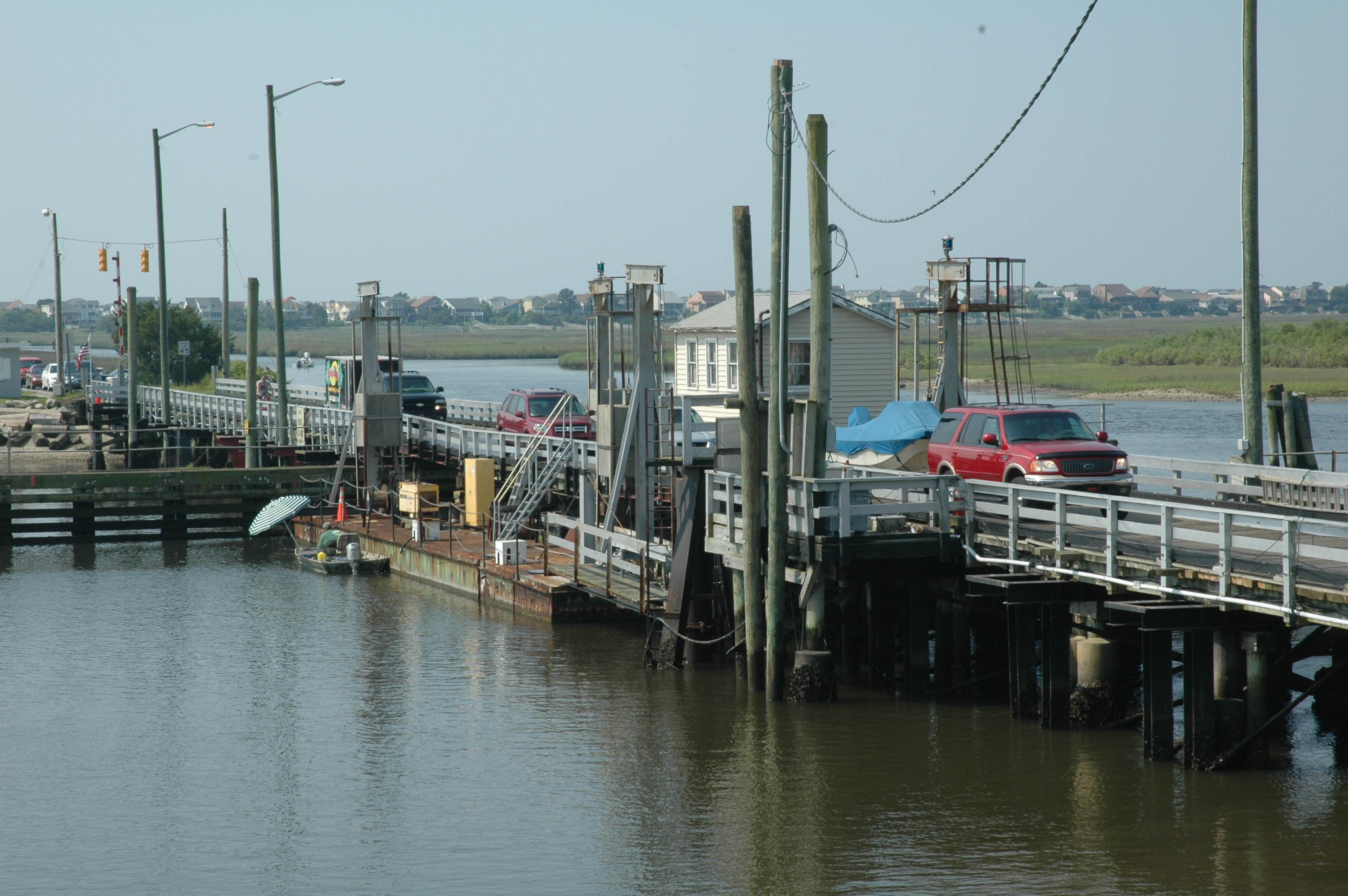
Sunset beach bridge 2006 with cars

Since most of Sunset Beach and the adjoining Bird Island coastal reserve encompass a barrier island, the only way to get there from the mainland was by crossing a pontoon bridge (swing bridge) straddling the Intracoastal Waterway and adjacent marshland. It was a wooden structure that could only hold one lane of traffic at any given time, and was the only one of its kind still in use along the East Coast until 2010. During the day in the summer, traffic would be stopped every hour, on the hour, and the bridge would open to boat traffic on the waterway for 10 minutes. At 10 minutes after the hour, every hour, the bridge would reopen for vehicular traffic again for 50 minutes. During the off-season, the bridge only opened at the request of boat traffic. While this caused headaches for those trying to get on or off the island, many locals said the bridge did, however, give the town a more relaxed feel. Historically, this had been in stark contrast to the rapid growth affecting other beach communities along the Grand Strand.

In February 2008 the NCDOT started construction to replace the old bridge with a modern, 65-foot-high (20 m) arc bridge (non-draw, non-swing). The bridge opened November 11, 2010. The old Sunset Beach pontoon swing bridge was saved by the Old Bridge Preservation Society which plans to create a museum celebrating the old bridge and the town's history. The new bridge eliminates the need for a bridge keeper and provides for a continual flow of vehicle traffic on and off the island, and water traffic on the Intracoastal Waterway.

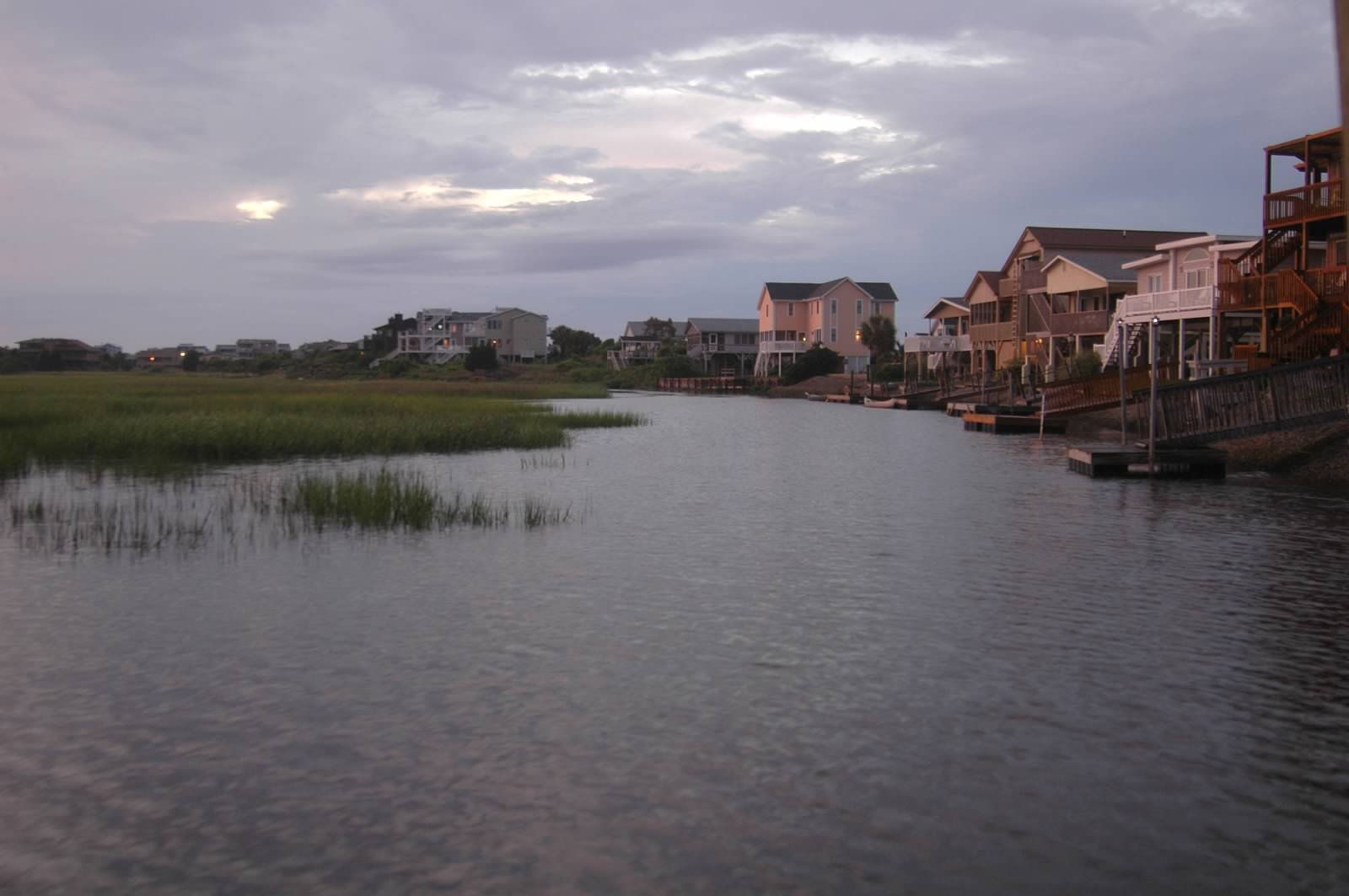
Sunset Beach Beach Houses at Dusk

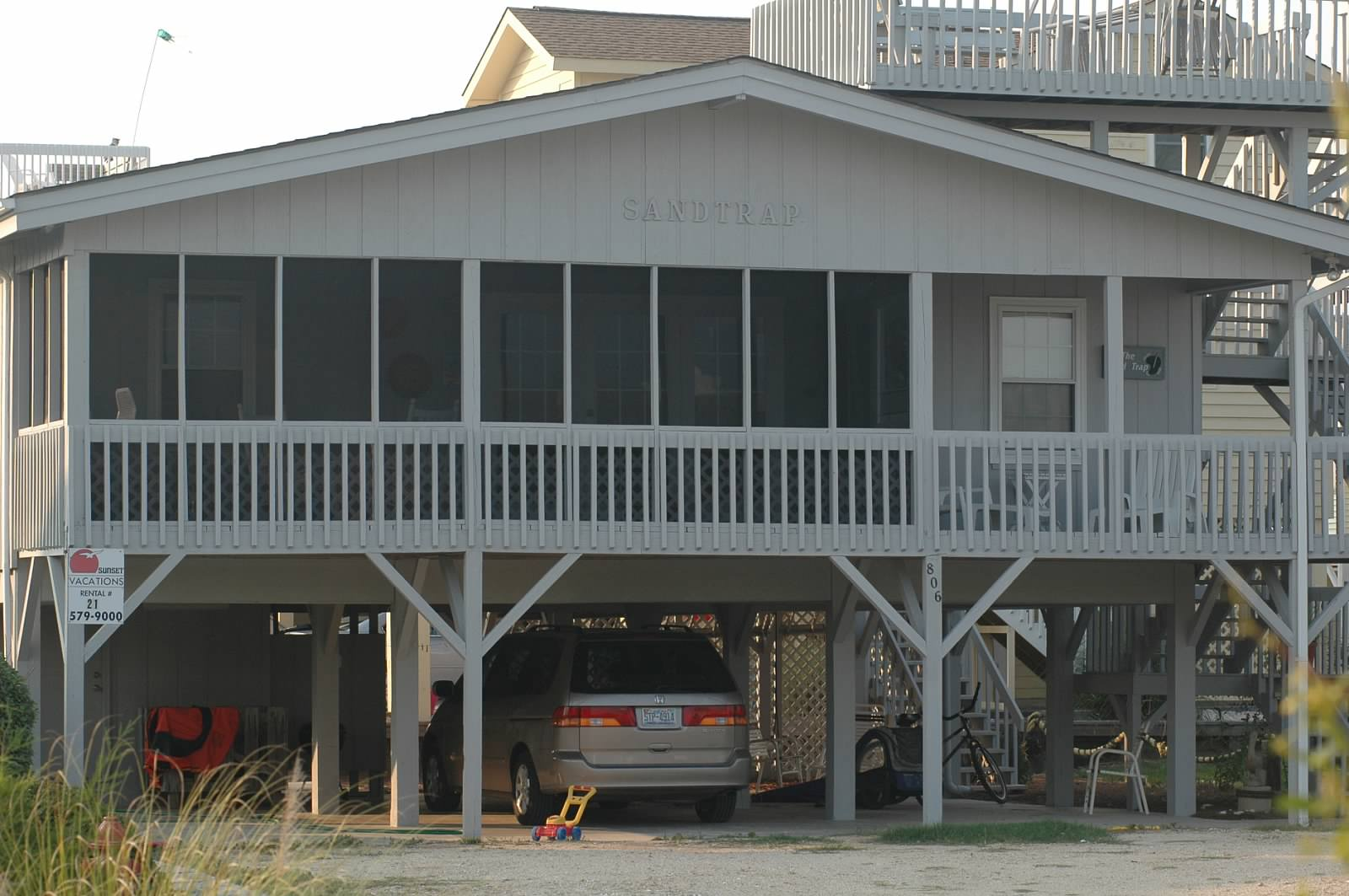
A beach house at Sunset Beach, NC named "SandTrap"

== Housing in Sunset Beach ==
The town consists of both mainland neighborhoods and a barrier island of approximately 1,200 homes. Three of the larger mainland neighborhoods in the town are golf course developments at Oyster Bay, Sea Trail Resort and Sandpiper Bay. Ocean Ridge Plantation, while not in the town limits, has one of its "sister communities" in Sunset Beach's ETJ. Ocean Ridge has an amenities center/clubhouse on the island, while Sea Trail Home Owners Association has a designated parking lot for members. The island is primarily home to vacation rental homes and cottages, although there are close to 100 full-time residents as well.

Preceded by Ocean Isle Beach	Beaches of Southeastern North Carolina	Succeeded by Southernmost point
