= Brunswick High School =

Brunswick High School may refer to several high schools in North America:

- Brunswick High School (Georgia) in Brunswick, Georgia
- Brunswick High School (Maine) in Brunswick, Maine
- Brunswick High School (Maryland) in Brunswick, Maryland
- Brunswick High School (Ohio) in Brunswick, Ohio
- Brunswick High School (Virginia) in Lawrenceville, Virginia

== See also ==
- Brunswick School in Greenwich, Connecticut
- East Brunswick High School in East Brunswick, New Jersey
- New Brunswick High School in New Brunswick, New Jersey
- North Brunswick High School in Leland, North Carolina
- North Brunswick Township High School in North Brunswick, New Jersey
- South Brunswick High School (New Jersey) in Monmouth Junction, New Jersey
- South Brunswick High School (North Carolina) in Southport, North Carolina
- Brunswick County Early College High School in Bolivia, North Carolina
- Brunswick County Academy in Bolivia, North Carolina
