= Brunswick County Schools =

School district in North Carolina

Location
- Brunswick County, North Carolina United States

District information
- Type: Public
- Grades: PK–13
- Superintendent: Mr. Dale Cole
- Accreditation: AdvancED
- Schools: 19
- Budget: $126,476,000
- NCES District ID: 3700420

Students and staff
- Students: 12,603
- Teachers: 825.16 (on FTE basis)
- Staff: 783.11 (on FTE basis)
- Student–teacher ratio: 15.27:1

Other information
- Website: www.bcswan.net

Brunswick County Schools is a PK–12 graded school district serving Brunswick County, North Carolina. Its 19 schools serve 12,603 students as of the 2017–2018 school year.

== Student demographics ==
For the 2017–2018 school year, Brunswick County Schools had a total population of 12,603 students and 825.11 teachers on a (FTE) basis. This produced a student-teacher ratio of 15.27:1. For the 2011-2012 school year, out of the student total, the gender ratio was 51% male to 49% female. The demographic group makeup was: White, 68%; Black, 17%; Hispanic, 10%; American Indian, 1%; and Asian/Pacific Islander, 1% (two or more races: 4%). For the same school year, 61.80% of the students received free and reduced-cost lunches.

== Governance ==
The primary governing body of Brunswick County Schools follows a council–manager government format with a five-member Board of Education appointing a Superintendent to run the day-to-day operations of the system. The school system currently resides in the North Carolina State Board of Education's Second District.

=== Board of education ===
The five members of the Board of Education generally meet on the first Tuesday of each month. The current members of the board are: Steven P. Barger (Chairman), Steve Gainey (Vice-Chair), Robin A. Moffitt, Catherine Cooke, and Vickie A. Smith. All five of its current school members are members of the republican party.

=== Superintendent ===
Dr. Jerry Oates served as the superintendent of Brunswick County Schools until his recent promotion with the North Carolina Department of Public Instruction. Mr. Dale Cole has served as the Superintendent of Schools since his exit from Clay County Schools in 2023.

== Member schools ==
Brunswick County Schools has 20 schools ranging from pre-kindergarten to twelfth grade. Those 20 schools are separated into four high schools, five middle schools, nine elementary schools, one Career/Technical center, and one combined middle/elementary school.

=== High schools ===
- Brunswick County Early College High School (Bolivia)
- North Brunswick High School (Leland)
- South Brunswick High School (Southport)
- The COAST (Center of Applied Sciences and Technology) – grades 6–12 (Bolivia)
- West Brunswick High School (Shallotte)

=== Middle schools ===
- Cedar Grove Middle School (Supply)
- Leland Middle School (Leland)
- Shallotte Middle School (Shallotte)
- South Brunswick Middle School (Southport)
- Town Creek Middle School (Winnabow)
- Waccamaw School – grades K–8 (Ash)

=== Elementary schools ===
- Belville Elementary School (Leland)
- Bolivia Elementary School (Bolivia)
- Jessie Mae Monroe Elementary School (Ash)
- Lincoln Elementary School (Leland)
- Southport Elementary School (Southport)
- Supply Elementary School (Supply)
- Town Creek Elementary School (Winnabow)
- Union Elementary School (Shallotte)
- Virginia Williamson Elementary School (Bolivia)

== Athletics ==
According to the North Carolina High School Athletic Association, for the 2023–2024 school year, North Brunswick, South Brunswick and West Brunswick are 3A schools in the Mideastern conference.

Neither Brunswick County Early College High School nor the Center of Applied Science and Technology have their own sports teams with the NCHSAA, however Brunswick County Early College High School has hosted the Southeast Region Early College Basketball Tournament for two-consecutive years.

== Awards ==
The Brunswick County Schools system has had four schools listed as Blue Ribbon Schools: Shallotte Middle School (1999–2000), Waccamaw School (2000–01), Brunswick College Early College High School (2017) and Union Elementary School (2019).

== See also ==
- List of school districts in North Carolina
