= Sunset Harbor, North Carolina =

Unincorporated community in North Carolina, US

- Unincorporated community
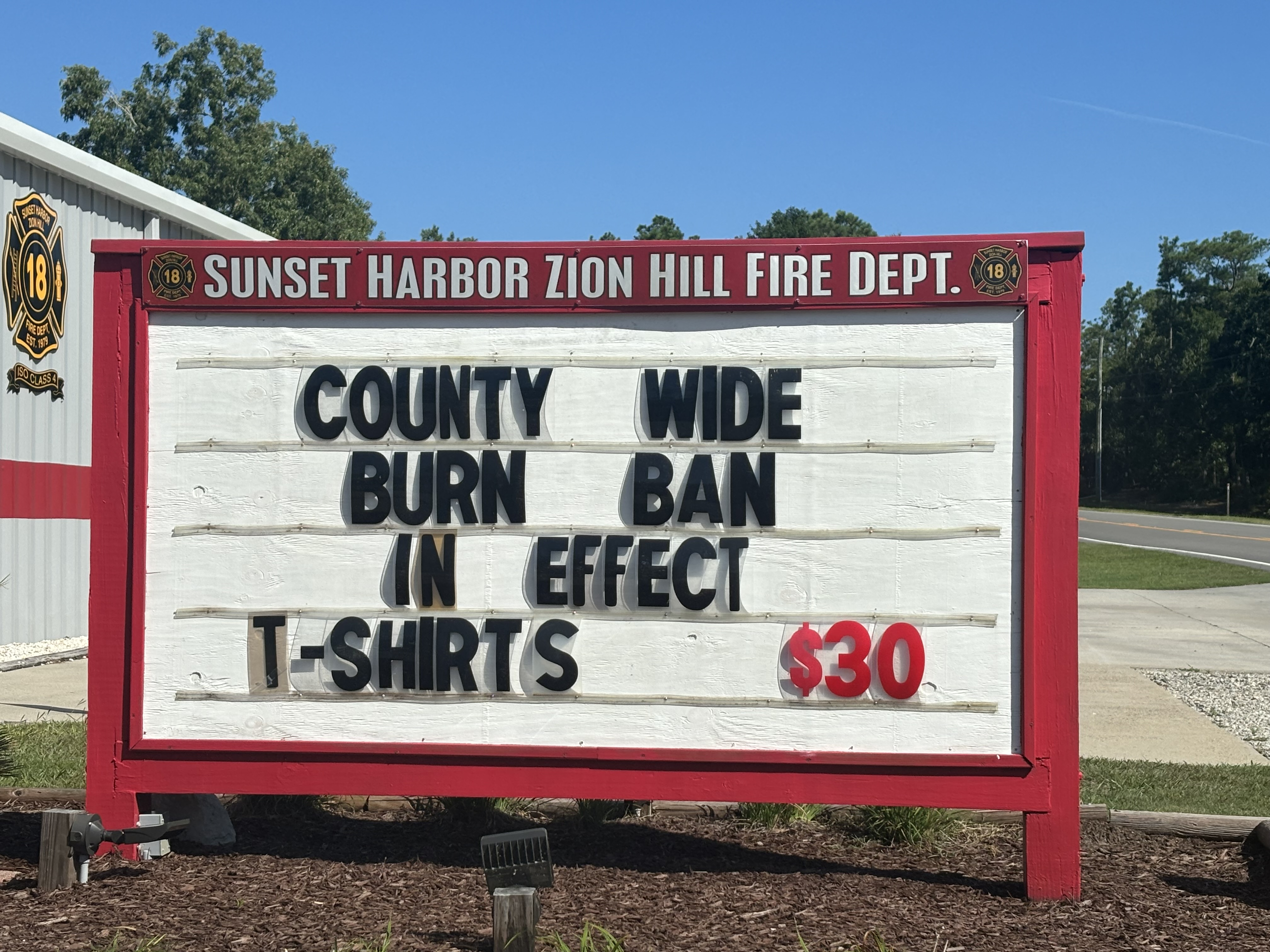
- Sunset Harbor Fire Department

- Location within the state of North Carolina
- Coordinates: 33°55′57″N 78°12′06″W
- Country: United States
- State: North Carolina
- County: Brunswick
- Time zone: UTC−5 (Eastern Standard)
  - Summer (DST): UTC−4 (Eastern Daylight)
- ZIP code: 28422
- Area codes: 910, 472

Sunset Harbor is an unincorporated community on the banks of the Lockwood Folly River and the Atlantic Intracoastal Waterway in Brunswick County, North Carolina, United States. It is bordered by the city limits of Oak Island and is situated across the river from Varnamtown. By road, the community can only be accessed by Sunset Harbor Road, which feeds into North Carolina Highway 211.

Originally named Howell's Point, Sunset Harbor was developed in the 1940s. The settlement had a hotel and a small general store. In 1966 the development was renamed Sunset Harbor.
