= North Carolina Highway 906 =

State highway in Brunswick County, North Carolina, US

North Carolina Highway 906

Route information
- Maintained by NCDOT
- Length: 12.4 mi (20.0 km)
- Existed: 2016–present

Major junctions
- South end: Beach Drive in Oak Island
- North end: US 17 near Bolivia

Location
- Country: United States
- State: North Carolina
- Counties: Brunswick

Highway system
- North Carolina Highway System; Interstate; US; State; Scenic
← NC 905	→ US 1

North Carolina Highway 906 (NC 906) is a primary state highway in the U.S. state of North Carolina. It serves as an access and evacuation route for Oak Island.

== Route description ==
NC 906 begins as a two-lane road at Beach Drive, as Middleton Boulevard. Crossing over Davis Creek, it widens to a four-lane at Oak Island Drive (SR 1190). After crossing over the Intracoastal Waterway, leaving Oak Island, the highway continues for 3.5 miles (5.6 km) to NC 211 (Southport-Supply Road). Continuing north as Midway Road, it goes back to two-lane as it goes through the communities of Suburb, Antioch and Half Hell. At US 17 Business (Old Ocean Highway), it does a brief one-tenth-mile (0.16 km) overlap and continues on along Galloway Road. NC 906 ends, after 12.4 miles (20.0 km), at US 17 (Ocean Highway).

== History ==
Discussion of a new state highway began in 2013, when State Senator Bill Rabon sent a letter to the NCDOT Division 3 Office asking for support to establish a new primary route along Midway Road. The justification was the completion of Swain's Cut Bridge (November, 2011), highlighting that it's another route to Oak Island as well as an evacuation route. NCDOT Division 3 Office submitted a route change request in June 2014 and the town of Oak Island signed off in December 2015. NC 906 was certified and established on January 26, 2016; traversing from Beach Drive (SR 1104), in Oak Island, to US 17, near Bolivia. It is the highest route number signed as a primary route in North Carolina.

== Junction list ==
The entire route is in Brunswick County.

Location	mi	km	Destinations	Notes
Oak Island	0.0	0.0	Beach Drive	
Intracoastal Waterway	0.9	1.4	Swain's Cut Bridge	
Midway	4.5	7.2	NC 211 (Southport-Supply Road) – Southport, Supply	
	11.1	17.9	US 17 Bus. south (Old Ocean Highway)	South end of US 17 Bus. overlap
	11.2	18.0	US 17 Bus. north (Old Ocean Highway) – Bolivia	North end of US 17 Bus. overlap
	12.4	20.0	US 17 (Ocean Highway) – Wilmington, Myrtle Beach	
1.000 mi = 1.609 km; 1.000 km = 0.621 mi: Concurrency terminus
