= G. V. Barbee Bridge =

Bridge on Oak Island, North Carolina

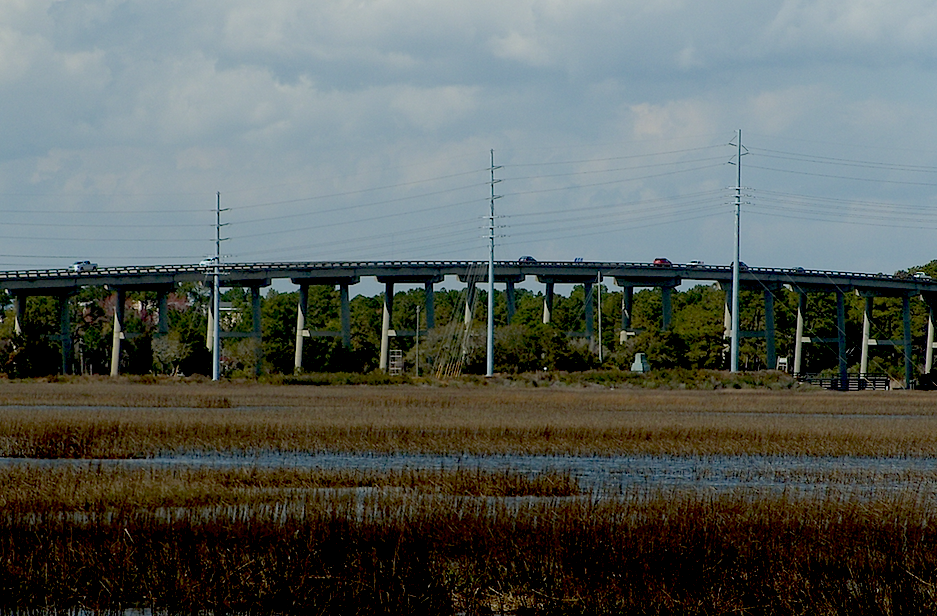
- G. V. Barbee Bridge
- Coordinates: 33°55′19″N 78°04′21″W
- Carries: Two lanes of NC 133
- Crosses: Atlantic Intracoastal Waterway
- Locale: Oak Island, North Carolina
- Official name: G. V. Barbee Bridge
- Maintained by: NCDOT

Characteristics
- Design: High rise precast concrete
- Total length: 4,250 feet (1,295 m)
- Width: 32 feet (10 m)
- Longest span: 100 feet (30 m)
- Clearance below: 65 feet (20 m)

History
- Opened: March 6, 1975; 50 years ago
- Replaces: Oak Island Swingbridge

The G. V. Barbee Bridge carries NC 133 across the Atlantic Intracoastal Waterway (ICW), connecting Oak Island, North Carolina to the mainland. The 4,250-foot-long (1,300 m), 65-foot-high (20 m) structure, built under contract to the NC DOT, consists of 37 concrete girder main spans and 28 hollow core concrete slab approach spans. In the 2018/ 2019 time frame, DOT replaced all 28 cored concrete slabs and the barrier rails, resurfaced the roadway and made substructure repairs to include work on the pier caps, columns, piles and footings.

== History ==
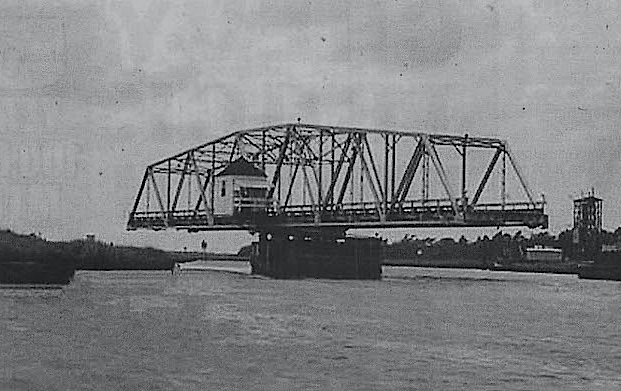
Oak Island Swingbridge circa 1950

When the ICW was completed in the late 1930s, a swingbridge initially provided access to Oak Island. Destroyed by a barge strike in 1971, construction of a high rise replacement named after G. V. Barbee, a distinguished Oak Island resident, began in 1972 and opened for traffic in 1975 (interim service included a ferry and pontoon bridge). The extensive repairs which commenced in October 2018 were completed in April 2019.

== Design and construction ==
The concrete deck bridge is 32’ wide and consists of two traffic lanes with a pullout lane on each side. The bridge begins a fairly sharp rise just after the NC133 roadway passes by the Cape Fear Regional Jetport, going over the ICW at it highest point (65’ above Mean High Water). It then descends to the marsh where 28 approach spans bring it onto Oak Island. The National Bridge Inventory Data Base for 2016 noted that the bridge railings did not meet acceptable standards. This became quite apparent when in December 2017, a dump truck crashed through the concrete guard railing into the marsh killing the driver. The new rails which were installed in 2019 are now structurally similar to those on the Swain's Cut Bridge which connects the island to the mainland further west.

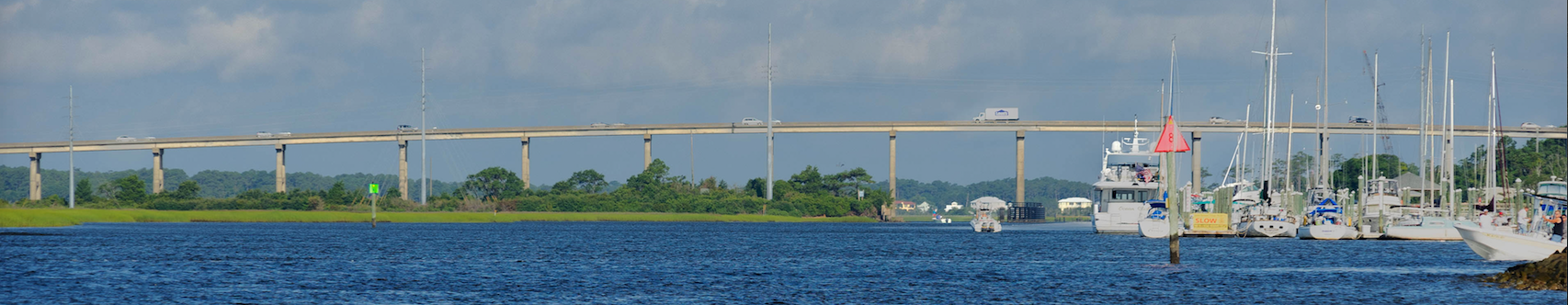
View of the Barbee Bridge looking west from the ICW just off South Harbor
