= Red bug (disambiguation) =

Red bug may refer to:

- Tegastes acroporanus a coral parasite, known in the reef-keeping hobby as "red bugs"
- Red Bug, North Carolina
- Auto Red Bug, an automobile manufactured 1916-1920 by the American Motor Vehicle Company in Lafayette, Indiana
- Pyrrhocoridae, a family of insects
- Smith Flyer, an automobile manufactured 1915-1919 by the A.O. Smith Company in Milwaukee, Wisconsin
- Trombicula, a genus of harvest mites
