= Pinch Gut Creek =

Stream in Brunswick County, North Carolina, United States

Coordinates: 34.0847°N 78.2005°W

Pinch Gut Creek is a stream in Brunswick County, North Carolina, United States. It is a tributary of Lockwood Folly River.

Pinch Gut Creek was so named by the Native Americans on account of there being too little food available in that area.

== See also ==
- List of rivers of North Carolina
