= Swain's Cut Bridge =

Bridge on Oak Island, North Carolina

Swain’s Cut Bridge
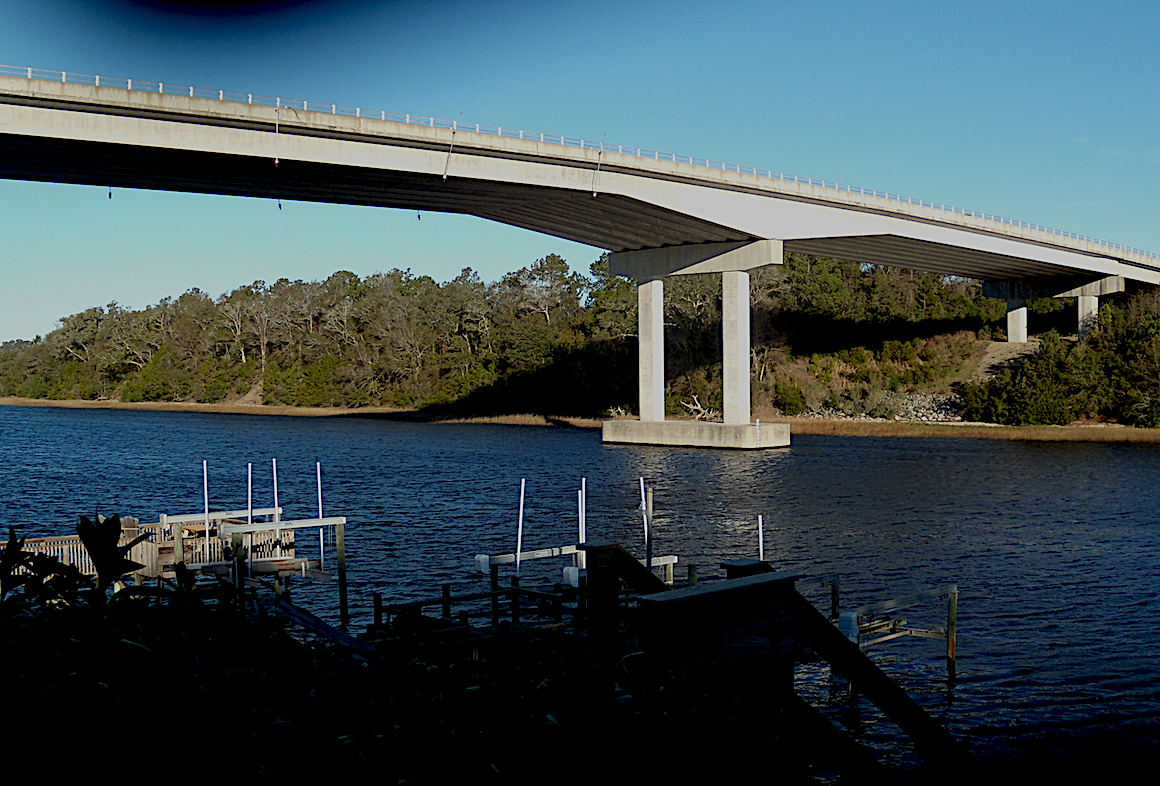
- Swain’s Cut Bridge
- Coordinates: 33°55′39″N 78°09′33″W
- Carries: Four lanes of NC 906
- Crosses: Atlantic Intracoastal Waterway
- Locale: Oak Island, North Carolina
- Maintained by: NCDOT

Characteristics
- Design: High rise precast concrete
- Total length: 980 feet (299 m)
- Width: 80 feet (24 m)
- Longest span: 278 feet (85 m)
- Clearance below: 65 feet (20 m)

History
- Construction cost: $36 million
- Opened: October 13, 2010; 14 years ago

Swain’s Cut Bridge carries NC 906 across the Atlantic Intracoastal Waterway (ICW) connecting Oak Island, NC to the mainland. Built for $36 million under contract to the North Carolina Department of Transportation, the bridge opened for traffic in the fall of 2010. A high rise design similar to the Barbee Bridge which crosses the ICW at the east end of the island, the Swain's Cut Bridge is built over a narrow part of the channel and required only three main spans while the Barbee Bridge needed 37.

== History ==
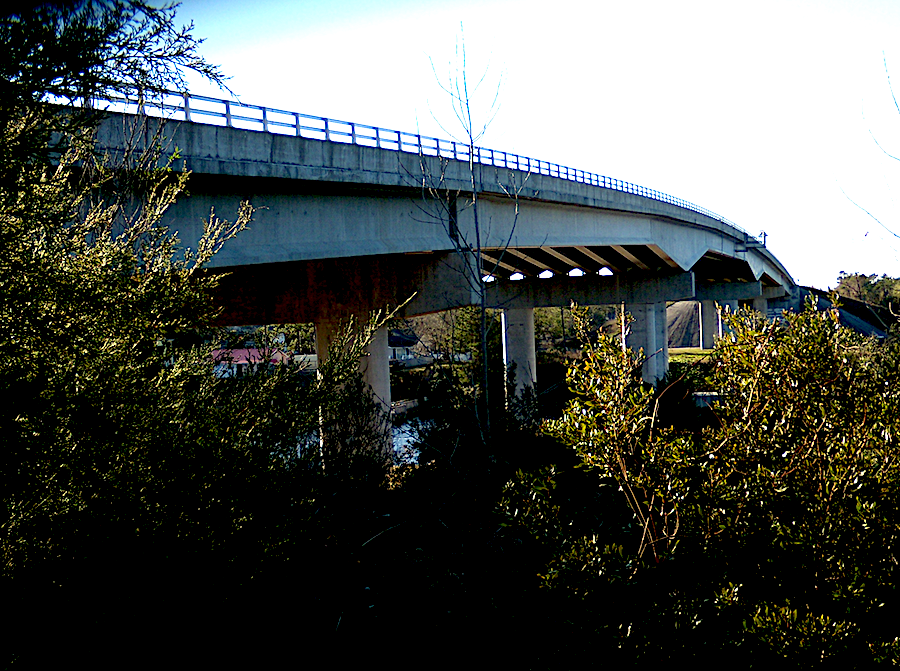
Looking south towards Oak island

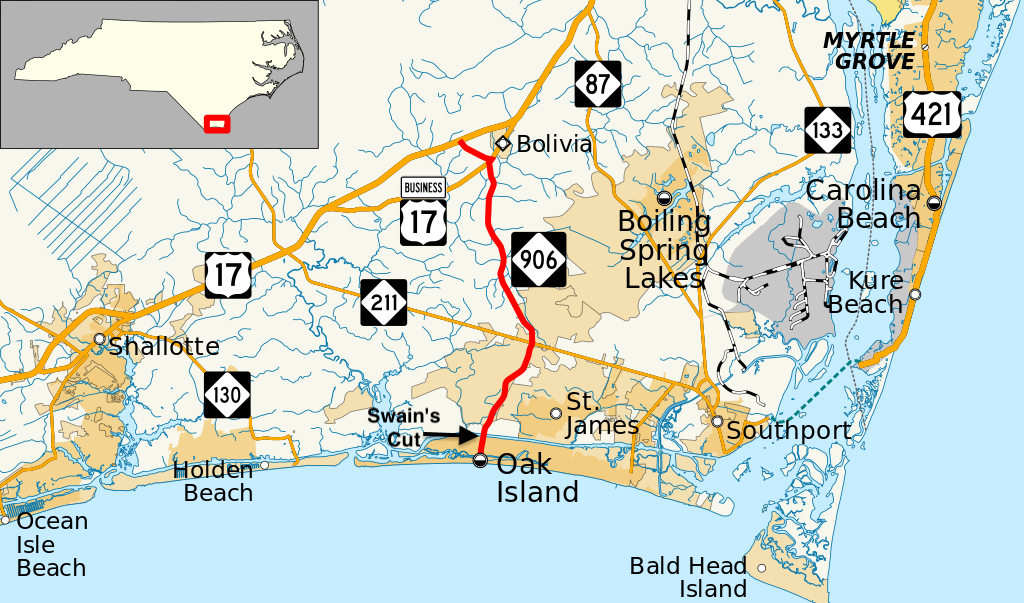
NC 906 & Swain’s Cut

Upon completion of the ICW in the late 1930s, a swingbridge initially provided access from the mainland to Oak Island. Destroyed by a barge strike in 1971, the Barbee Bridge opened in 1975 as its replacement. As Oak Island’s population grew however, the large volume of summer vacation traffic and hurricane evacuation concerns prompted the state to approve building a second bridge on the west end of the island over Swain’s Cut. The bridge is named for the Swain family, which owned the land around the bridge during the dredging of the ICW in the 1930s. At the same time the bridge was being built, a three mile long extension of NC 906 was constructed to connect it to NC 211.

== Design and construction ==
The 980-foot-long (300 m), 80-foot-wide (24 m) deck structure, consists of prestressed concrete girders which carry four traffic lanes across the ICW at 65’ above Mean High Water. The bridge has for the most part been accident free with the notable exception of a construction related incident in December 2008 when a concrete girder placed on a pier dislodged before it was property secured, fell to the ground and killed one worker. The National Bridge Inventory for 2017 listed the bridge condition as good.

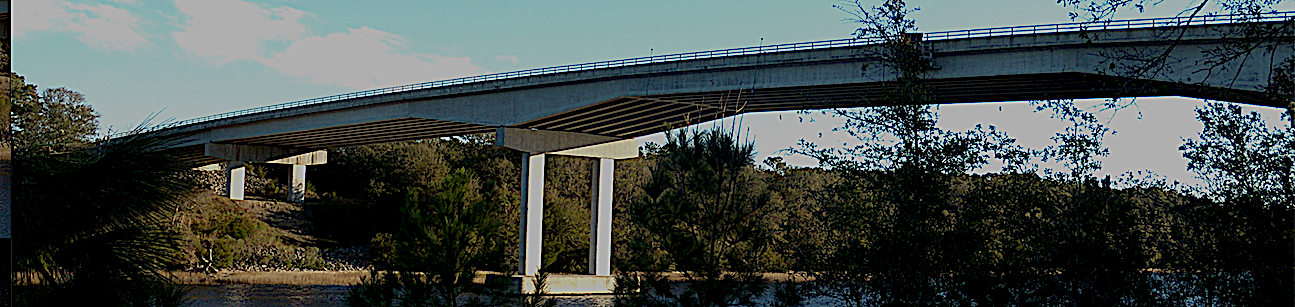
View of the Swain’s Cut Bridge looking northeast over the ICW
