= Quinton McCracken =

American baseball player (born 1970)

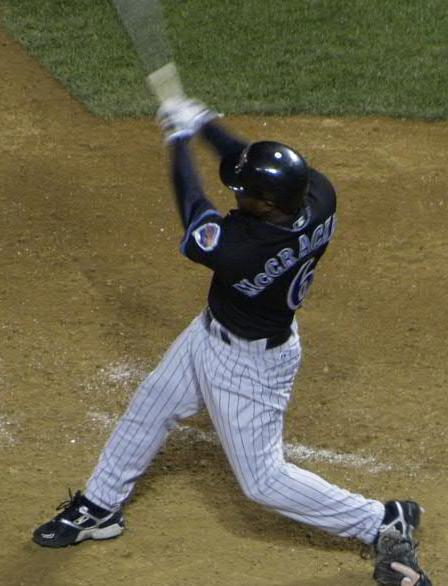
- McCracken with the Arizona Diamondbacks in 2005
- Outfielder
- Born: August 16, 1970 (age 56); Southport, North Carolina, U.S.
- Batted: Switch Threw: Right

MLB debut
- September 17, 1995, for the Colorado Rockies

Last MLB appearance
- July 5, 2006, for the Cincinnati Reds

MLB statistics
- Batting average: .274
- Home runs: 21
- Runs batted in: 244
- Stats at Baseball Reference

Teams
- Colorado Rockies (1995–1997); Tampa Bay Devil Rays (1998–2000); Minnesota Twins (2001); Arizona Diamondbacks (2002–2003); Seattle Mariners (2004); Arizona Diamondbacks (2004–2005); Cincinnati Reds (2006)

Quinton Antoine McCracken (born August 16, 1970) is an American former professional baseball outfielder. He played all or parts of 12 seasons in Major League Baseball (MLB), and was the Tampa Bay Devil Rays franchise's first center fielder and batter on March 31, 1998.

== Early life ==
McCracken attended South Brunswick High School where he was a running back and free safety in football, a point guard in basketball, and also a baseball star and a track standout. As a senior in 1988, McCracken led his baseball team to a 29–0 record and the NCHSAA 2A State Championship. USA Today rated South Brunswick's baseball team the fifth-best in the nation that year.

== Professional career ==
After graduating from Duke University. McCracken was selected by the Colorado Rockies in their inaugural draft in 1992 in the 25th round. He made his major league debut as a September call-up on September 17, 1995. In three games, he struck out in his only at bat. In 1996, he played mostly center field, batting .290 in 283 at-bats. In 1997, he stole a career-high 28 bases and increased his batting average to .292.

McCracken was drafted by the expansion Tampa Bay Devil Rays on November 18, 1997, as their second pick in the 1997 MLB expansion draft, to be their starting center fielder for 1998. Playing in a career-high 155 games, McCracken had his best-ever season, batting .292 with 7 home runs, 59 RBI, and was named the Devil Rays first-ever most valuable player. After playing only 40 games in 1999, because of a torn ACL, he spent most of 2000 in the minors with Triple-A Durham. The Devil Rays released him on November 27, 2000, and he signed with the St. Louis Cardinals on December 22, he was released in spring training. On April 13, 2001, McCracken signed with the Minnesota Twins. He again spent most of the year in Triple-A, where he batted .338 for Edmonton.

He became a free agent after the season and on January 9, 2002, signed with the Arizona Diamondbacks. He spent the entire season with the major league club, hitting .309 as the Diamondbacks won the NL West. McCracken batted .364 in 11 at-bats against the St. Louis Cardinals in the NLDS, but the D-Backs were swept out of the playoffs by the Cardinals. His batting average dropped nearly 100 points in 2003 to .227. On December 15, 2003, he was traded to the Seattle Mariners for first baseman Greg Colbrunn. However, McCracken did not get much playing time with Seattle, and on June 9 he was released. Two days later, he re-signed with the D-Backs and batted .288 in 55 games. He became a free agent after the season and re-signed with Arizona. McCracken struggled with a .237 batting average in 2005, becoming a free agent after the season.

On February 14, 2006, he signed with the Cincinnati Reds, but was released on July 6. The Minnesota Twins, after signing him to a minor league contract on July 21, announced at the end of the 2006 season that they would not re-sign McCracken after he had played for their Triple-A affiliate, the Rochester Red Wings. He was not picked up by another team, and signed on to play with the independent Bridgeport Bluefish of the Atlantic League. After one season in independent ball, McCracken played for the Dominican Winter Baseball League in late 2007 and retired.

== Post-playing career ==
McCracken joined the front office of the Diamondbacks in 2010, and moved to the Houston Astros in 2012. McCracken joined the Miami Marlins staff as an outfield/baserunning coordinator in 2018. In January 2019, he joined the Durham Bulls as a third-base coach in a return to the city where he attended college. On March 19, 2024, McCracken was named manager of the Mahoning Valley Scrappers of the MLB Draft League. He returned to coach the Scrappers for the 2025 season.. In 2026, Quinton joined the San Francisco Giants organization as Coordinator of their Arizona League Training Complex.
