= Long Beach, North Carolina =

Coordinates: 33°54′38″N 78°07′04″W

- Seaside town
- Interactive map of Long Beach, North Carolina
- Country: United States
- State: North Carolina
- County: Brunswick
- Time zone: Eastern

Long Beach, North Carolina is a coastal neighborhood on Oak Island incorporated in 1955. It is well known for the total devastation it sustained during Hurricane Hazel in 1954; only five of the 357 buildings survived the storm. It merged with neighboring Yaupon Beach in 1999 to form the town of Oak Island and is now a neighborhood of the town.

The community derives its name from one of the longest stretches of beach in the area.
