= Walker Jenkins =

American baseball player (born 2005)

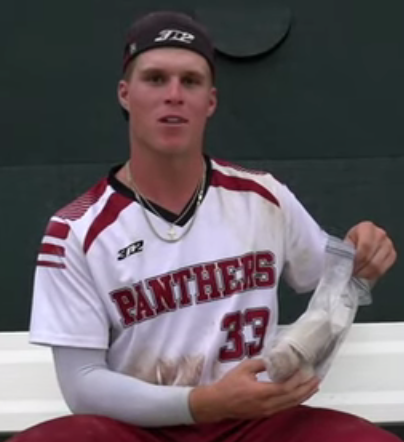
- Jenkins in 2022

Minnesota Twins – No. 11
- Outfielder
- Born: February 19, 2005 (age 21); Wilmington, North Carolina, U.S.
- Bats: Left Throws: Right

MLB debut
- August 28, 2026, for the Minnesota Twins

MLB statistics (through 2026 season)
- Batting average: .226
- Home runs: 4
- Runs batted in: 10
- Stats at Baseball Reference

Teams
- Minnesota Twins (2026–present)

Walker Clay Jenkins (born February 19, 2005) is an American professional baseball outfielder for the Minnesota Twins of Major League Baseball (MLB). He was selected by the Twins in the first round of the 2023 MLB draft, and made his MLB debut in 2026.

== Amateur career ==
Jenkins attended South Brunswick High School in Southport, North Carolina, where he played baseball. As a junior in 2022, he batted .527 with ten home runs, 40 runs batted in (RBI), 13 doubles, and 18 stolen bases. He was named the Gatorade North Carolina Baseball Player of the Year. That summer, he participated in the Prospect Development Pipeline League at the USA Baseball National Training Complex in Cary, North Carolina. He was also selected to play in the High School All-American Game at Dodger Stadium.

Jenkins entered his senior baseball season in 2023 as a top prospect for the upcoming MLB draft. Jenkins finished his senior year with a .480 batting average and 32 runs scored. He committed and signed to play college baseball for the North Carolina Tar Heels baseball team.

== Professional career ==
The Minnesota Twins selected Jenkins in the first round, with the fifth overall pick, of the 2023 Major League Baseball draft. On July 25, 2023, Jenkins signed with the Twins for an above-slot deal worth $7.14 million.

Jenkins made his professional debut with the Florida Complex League Twins and was later promoted to the Single-A Fort Myers Mighty Mussels. Over 26 games, he batted .362 with three home runs and 22 RBI. He was assigned to Fort Myers to open the 2024 season. He was promoted to the High-A Cedar Rapids Kernels in late July, and also earned a promotion to the Double-A Wichita Wind Surge near the season's end. He missed time during the season due to a hamstring injury. Over 82 games for the season, Jenkins hit .282 with six home runs, 58 RBI, and 17 stolen bases. Jenkins opened the 2025 season back with Wichita, but missed time in April, May, and June due to an ankle injury. After rehabbing, he returned to play with Wichita in June and was then promoted to the Triple-A St. Paul Saints in August. Jenkins appeared in a total of 84 games during the season, hitting .286 with ten home runs, 34 RBI, and 17 stolen bases.

Jenkins was assigned to St. Paul to open the 2026 season. In early May, he was placed on the injured list with a shoulder sprain that occurred when running into the outfield wall while making a catch. He began a rehab assignment with Fort Myers on June 13. He then appeared in three rehab games with Cedar Rapids before returning to St. Paul. In July, Jenkins was selected to represent the Twins at the 2026 All-Star Futures Game alongside Kaelen Culpepper. Across 69 games with St. Paul, Jenkins batted .308 with 12 home runs, 28 RBI, and 17 stolen bases. The Twins named him their Minor League Player of the Year.

On August 27, 2026, the Twins announced that Jenkins would be promoted to the major leagues for the first time following an injury to Byron Buxton. The next day, his contract was officially selected by the Twins. On the same day, batting ninth and starting in center field, he made his major league debut against the Chicago White Sox. He collected his first career hit in the fourth inning with a single off White Sox starting pitcher Luis Castillo and finished the game 1-for-3 with a walk in a loss for the Twins. On August 31, Jenkins hit his first career MLB home run, a two run home run, off Detroit Tigers outfielder Zach McKinstry in an 11–1 Twins win. He played in a total of 26 games for the Twins and ended the season with a .226 batting average, four home runs, and 10 RBI.
