= Varnamtown, North Carolina =

- Town
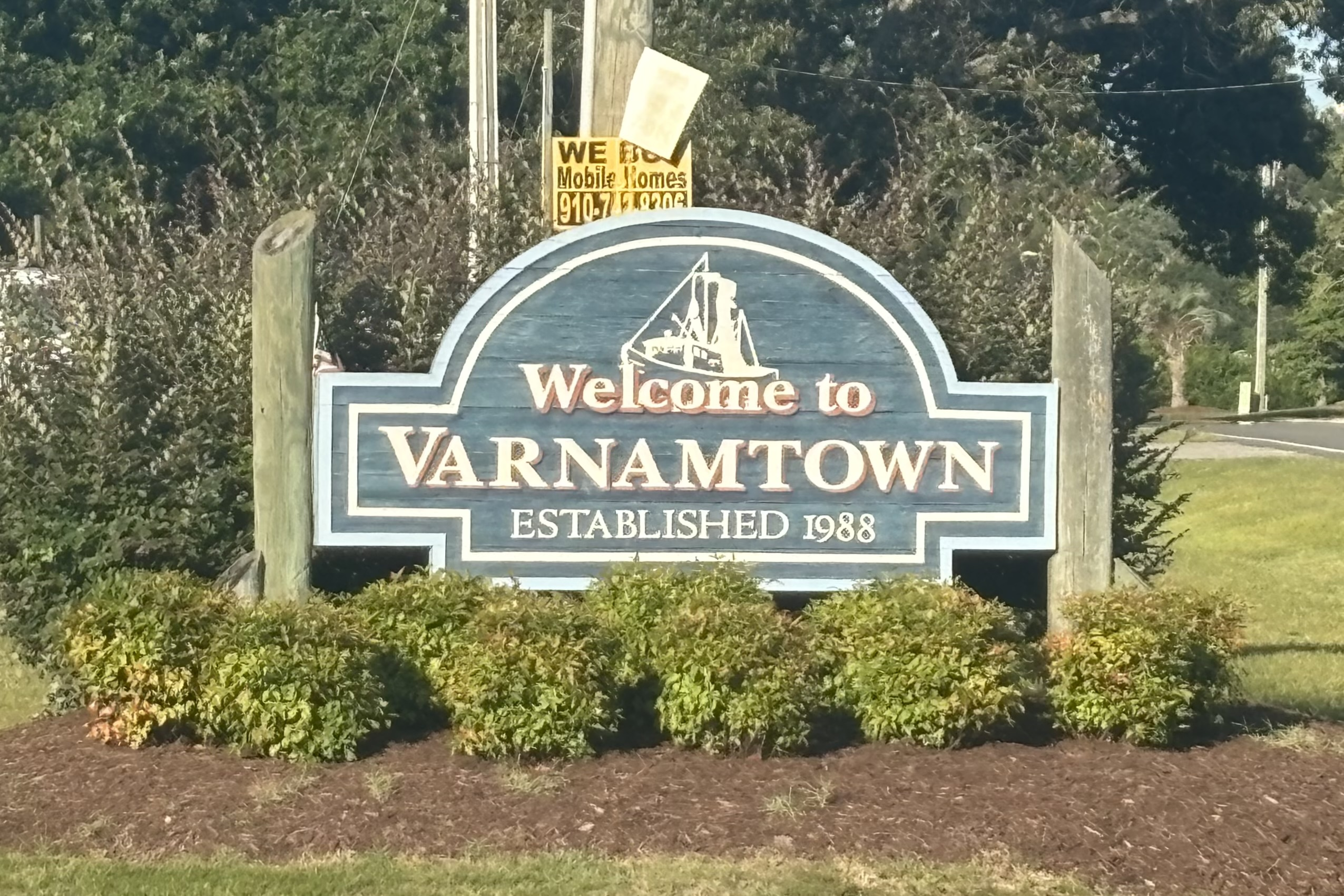
- Welcome to Varnamtown Sign

- Seal

- Location within the state of North Carolina
- Coordinates: 33°56′35″N 78°14′11″W
- Country: United States
- State: North Carolina
- County: Brunswick
- Town Established: 1988

Government
  - Mayor: Gary Galloway Jr.

Area
  - Total: 0.94 sq mi (2.43 km^{2})
  - Land: 0.88 sq mi (2.28 km^{2})
  - Water: 0.054 sq mi (0.14 km^{2})
- Elevation: 26 ft (7.9 m)

Population (2020)
  - Total: 525
  - Density: 595.4/sq mi (229.87/km^{2})
- Time zone: UTC-5 (Eastern (EST))
  - Summer (DST): UTC-4 (EDT)
- FIPS code: 37-69795
- GNIS feature ID: 2406794
- Website: https://www.townofvarnamtown.gov/

Varnamtown is a town in Brunswick County, North Carolina, United States situated on the banks of the Lockwood Folly River. As of the 2020 census, Varnamtown had a population of 525. It is part of the Wilmington, NC Metropolitan Statistical Area.

== History ==
Varnamtown was incorporated as a town in 1988.

== Geography ==
Varnamtown is located in southern Brunswick County and is bordered to the east by the tidal Lockwood Folly River. The town of Holden Beach is 2.5 miles (4.0 km) to the southwest.

According to the United States Census Bureau, Varnamtown has a total area of 0.97 square miles (2.5 km^{2}), of which 0.89 square miles (2.3 km^{2}) is land and 0.08 square miles (0.2 km^{2}) (6.31%) is water.

== Demographics ==
Historical population
Census	Pop.	Note	%±
1990	404		—
2000	481		19.1%
2010	541		12.5%
2020	525		−3.0%
U.S. Decennial Census

As of the census of 2000, there were 481 people, 203 households, and 155 families residing in the town. The population density was 480.2 inhabitants per square mile (185.4/km^{2}). There were 235 housing units at an average density of 234.6 units per square mile (90.6 units/km^{2}). The racial makeup of the town was 99.17% White, 0.42% Native American, 0.21% Asian, and 0.21% from two or more races. Hispanic or Latino of any race were 0.62% of the population.

There were 203 households, out of which 27.1% had children under the age of 18 living with them, 70.0% were married couples living together, 3.9% had a female householder with no husband present, and 23.2% were non-families. 20.2% of all households were made up of individuals, and 8.9% had someone living alone who was 65 years of age or older. The average household size was 2.37 and the average family size was 2.72.

In the town, the population was spread out, with 19.5% under the age of 18, 5.6% from 18 to 24, 28.5% from 25 to 44, 29.5% from 45 to 64, and 16.8% who were 65 years of age or older. The median age was 42 years. For every 100 females, there were 102.1 males. For every 100 females age 18 and over, there were 98.5 males.

The median income for a household in the town was $33,750, and the median income for a family was $35,357. Males had a median income of $29,375 versus $25,694 for females. The per capita income for the town was $18,394. About 9.8% of families and 11.4% of the population were below the poverty line, including 16.5% of those under age 18 and 17.5% of those age 65 or over.
