= Yaupon Beach, North Carolina =

Coordinates: 33°54′18″N 78°04′42″W

- Seaside town
- Interactive map of Yaupon Beach, North Carolina
- Country: United States
- State: North Carolina
- County: Brunswick
- Time zone: Eastern

Yaupon Beach, North Carolina is a neighborhood of the coastal town of Oak Island in Brunswick County, North Carolina.

== History ==
Originally a coastal resort, Yaupon Beach was incorporated as a town in 1955, and the fishing pier was built. The town was named for the abundance of yaupon near the original town site. It has weathered many hurricanes, including Hazel in 1954, Floyd in 1999, and Irene in 2011. It merged with neighboring Long Beach in 1999 to form the town of Oak Island. The primary reason for this was that Yaupon beach had a sewer system, while Long Beach did not. Caswell Beach, another nearby town, chose to remain independent. The community is primarily composed of renters and retirees, and has been since at least 1998. Consequently, the sand dunes that protect the town have been degrading in recent years, with Oak Island mayor Liz White starting a $40 million beach management plan in 2021 to revitalize the natural barrier.

== Yaupon Beach Pier ==
The Yaupon Beach fishing pier is a 908 foot long wooden pier, originally built in 1955. It has been rebuilt twice in its lifetime, in 1972 and 1992. At 27 feet above sea level, it is the highest pier in North Carolina. The pier is a famous fishing spot, with an average of 250 king mackerel being caught off of it each year. In 1966, a 1,150 lb tiger shark, the largest ever caught in North Carolina, was reeled in off of the pier. Other marine life caught from the pier include pompano, cobia, mullet, sheepshead, trout, and croaker. It has been ranked as the 14th best pier in North Carolina by Visit North Carolina.
