= Half Hell, North Carolina =

- Unincorporated community
- Location in North Carolina Location in the United States
- Coordinates: 34°2′26″N 78°9′19″W
- Country: United States
- State: North Carolina
- County: Brunswick
- Elevation: 30 ft (9.1 m)
- Time zone: UTC-5 (Eastern (EST))
  - Summer (DST): UTC-4 (EDT)
- GNIS feature ID: 1020587

Half Hell is an unincorporated community in Brunswick County, North Carolina, United States.

The settlement is located on Highway 906, approximately 2 mi (3.2 km) south of Bolivia. "Half Hell Swamp" is located approximately 2 mi (3.2 km) south of Half Hell.

== History ==
The settlement's name may have originated in the 1800s when settlers migrating south encountered dense swamps located there. Unable to cross, they settled at that location "halfway to hell". The name "Half Hell" may have also originated from the area's early reputation for illegal activities, particularly moonshining. Finally, the name may have been a reference to the midway point—"half way to hell"—for local farmers traveling to Southport to pay their taxes.

Greenlands Farm is located in Half Hell. The Half Hell Folk Festival was held at the farm in 2015 and 2017.

Half Hell is also home to Half Hell's Horses and the Brunswick County Buckers youth riding club.
