= Brunswick County Early College High School =

Coordinates: 34°2′19″N 78°13′49″W

Location
- 50 College Rd NE; Bolivia, North Carolina 28422; United States

Information
- School type: Public
- Motto: "Success is Our Tradition"
- Established: 2005
- School district: Brunswick County Schools
- CEEB code: 340405
- NCES School ID: 370042002898
- Grades: 9–13
- Color(s): Red, Black, and Silver
- Team name: Firebirds
- Website: echs.bcswan.net

Brunswick County Early College High School (BCECHS) is a high school located on the Brunswick Community College campus in Bolivia, North Carolina. It is part of the Cooperative Innovative High Schools (CIHS) program, and is the only CIHS in Brunswick County.

== Awards ==
BCECHS was named a National Blue Ribbon School in 2017.
