= Lockwood Folly River =

Stream in North Carolina, USA

Lockwood Folly River Tributary Atlantic Ocean
- Location of Lockwood Folly River mouth Lockwood Folly River (the United States)

Location
- Country: United States
- State: North Carolina
- County: Brunswick

Physical characteristics
- Source: Confluence of Red Run and Pinch Gut Creek
  - location: about 0.5 miles southwest of Clements Curve, North Carolina
  - coordinates: 34°04′03″N 079°11′47″W
  - elevation: 23 ft (7.0 m)
- Mouth: Atlantic Ocean
  - location: Holden Beach, North Carolina
  - coordinates: 33°55′04″N 078°14′10″W
  - elevation: 0 ft (0 m)
- Length: 22.36 mi (35.98 km)
- Basin size: 136.22 square miles (352.8 km^{2})
- Discharge
  - location: Atlantic Ocean
  - average: 14.33 cu ft/s (0.406 m^{3}/s) at mouth with Atlantic Ocean

Basin features
- Progression: south and southwest
- River system: Atlantic Ocean
- Tributaries
  - left: Pinch Gut Creek; Ramshead Branch; Middle Branch; River Swamp; Nucitt Branch; Scotts Branch; Sandy Branch; Mill Creek; Mullet Creek
  - right: Red Run; Buck Branch; Ford Branch; Beaverdam Swamp; Doe Creek; Pamlico Creek
- Bridges: US 17, Old Ocean Highway E, Gilbert Road SE, NC 211

Lockwood Folly River or Lockwood's Folly River is a short tidal river in Brunswick County, North Carolina, United States. Waters from the Green Swamp drain into the river near Supply and flow southward to empty into the Atlantic Intracoastal Waterway near Sunset Harbor. The Lockwood Folly Country Club in Varnamtown takes its name from the river.

Lockwood Folly Inlet is a nearby inlet connecting the Atlantic Ocean to the Intracoastal Waterway and was once the mouth of the Lockwood Folly River prior to construction of the Intracoastal and natural sand shifting. The inlet separates the barrier islands of Oak Island and Holden Beach Isle.

== Name origin ==
There are two folklore stories that explain the genesis of the name "Lockwood Folly". The first states that a man by the name of Lockwood began building the "boat of his dreams" along the banks of the river. Working tirelessly for many months, Lockwood finally completed his sailing ship, but when he tried to float the boat, he discovered that he had made the draft too deep to clear the sandbar at the inlet. So with no way to sail the ship out of the river, Lockwood disappointedly left the ship to rot. The locals began calling the ship "Lockwood's Folly" and according to the story, eventually the name was applied to both the river and inlet.

The second tale tells the story of a group of settlers led by a man named Lockwood that decided to colonize the banks of the river. Lockwood supposedly did not bring enough supplies or got into a dispute with the local Indian tribe and the colony had to be disbanded. According to the story, the remains of the colony were named "Lockwood's Folly" and later the name came to encompass the nearby river and inlet.

The river name appears on a John Ogilby map from 1671, making Lockwood's Folly River one of the oldest named rivers in North Carolina.

== See also ==
- USS Iron Age (1862)
