= Holden Beach Bridge =

Bridge in Holden Beach, North Carolina, US

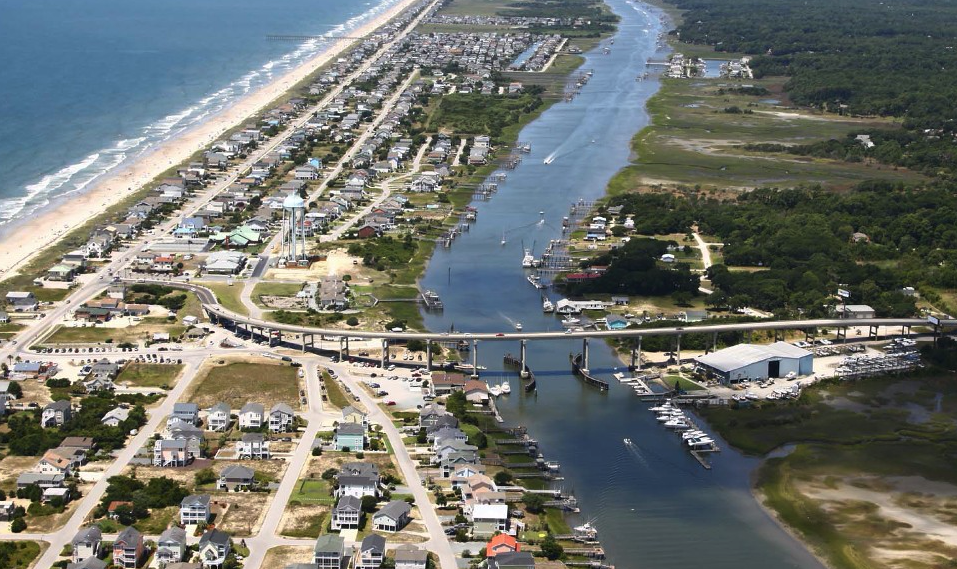
- Holden Beach Bridge
- Coordinates: 33°55′00″N 78°16′03″W
- Carries: NC 130
- Crosses: Atlantic Intracoastal Waterway
- Locale: Holden Beach, North Carolina
- Official name: Holden Beach Bridge
- Maintained by: North Carolina Department of Transportation

Characteristics
- Design: High rise steel and precast concrete
- Total length: 1,800 feet (549 m)
- Width: 16.5 feet (5 m)
- Longest span: 117 feet (36 m)
- Clearance below: 65 feet (20 m)

History
- Opened: May 13, 1986; 40 years ago

Location
- Interactive map of Holden Beach Bridge

The 65-foot-high (20 m) Holden Beach Bridge carries NC 130 across the Atlantic Intracoastal Waterway (ICW), connecting the town of Holden Beach to the mainland. The 1,800-foot-long (550 m) structure, built under contract to the North Carolina Department of Transportation, consists of 20 approach spans of Type III and IV prestressed concrete AASHTO girders and 3 channel spans of prestressed, precast box girders.

== History ==
Before the construction of the ICW in the late 1930s, Holden Beach residents got to the mainland via a log bridge. Ferry service began after the ICW was completed and lasted up until 1954. At that time, the beach town was developing so fast the ferry could not handle the traffic during the summer months, especially on weekends. Sometimes, cars would be backed up to the beach and then down Ocean Boulevard up to a quarter of a mile waiting for the ferry. In 1953, a swing bridge started to be constructed about 1/2 mile west of the ferry landing, one which was built well enough to survive the onslaught of Hurricane Hazel. But here again due to the large increase in both boat and vehicular traffic, this bridge was replaced by the current high rise structure on May 13, 1986.

== Design and construction ==
Built by the URS Corporation located in Raleigh NC (now a part of AECOM), the three main channel spans that cross the ICW are 86, 117’ and 100’ long. Federal and state funds were appropriated in the amount of $4.1 million to construct the bridge with the driving factor in the bridge's design the need to obtain a 65’ vertical clearance over the ICW at mean high water (U.S. Coast Guard requirement). Given the narrow width of the island, the bridge had to curve to the west, otherwise the slope would have been too steep were it to intersect with the ocean front road. From an engineering standpoint, this necessitated extensive crest and sag vertical curvature in the bridge design.

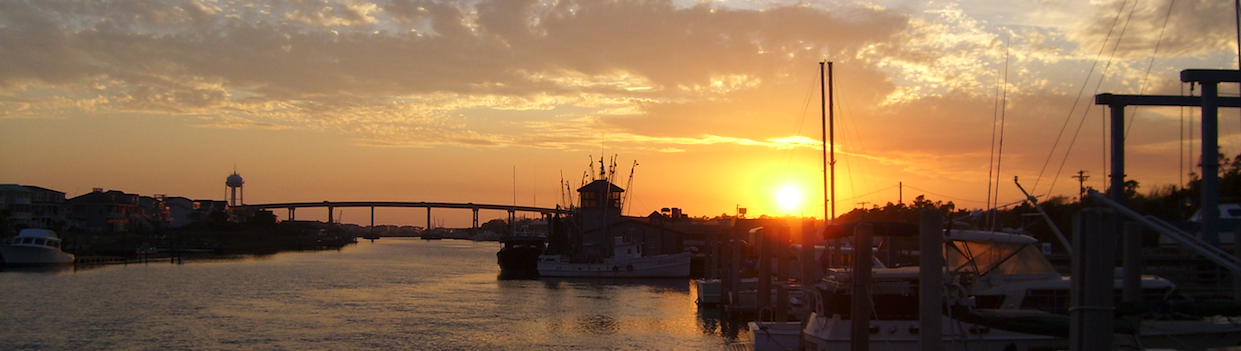
Panoramic view at sunset of the Holden Beach Bridge crossing of the ICW
