= Supply, North Carolina =

- Unincorporated community
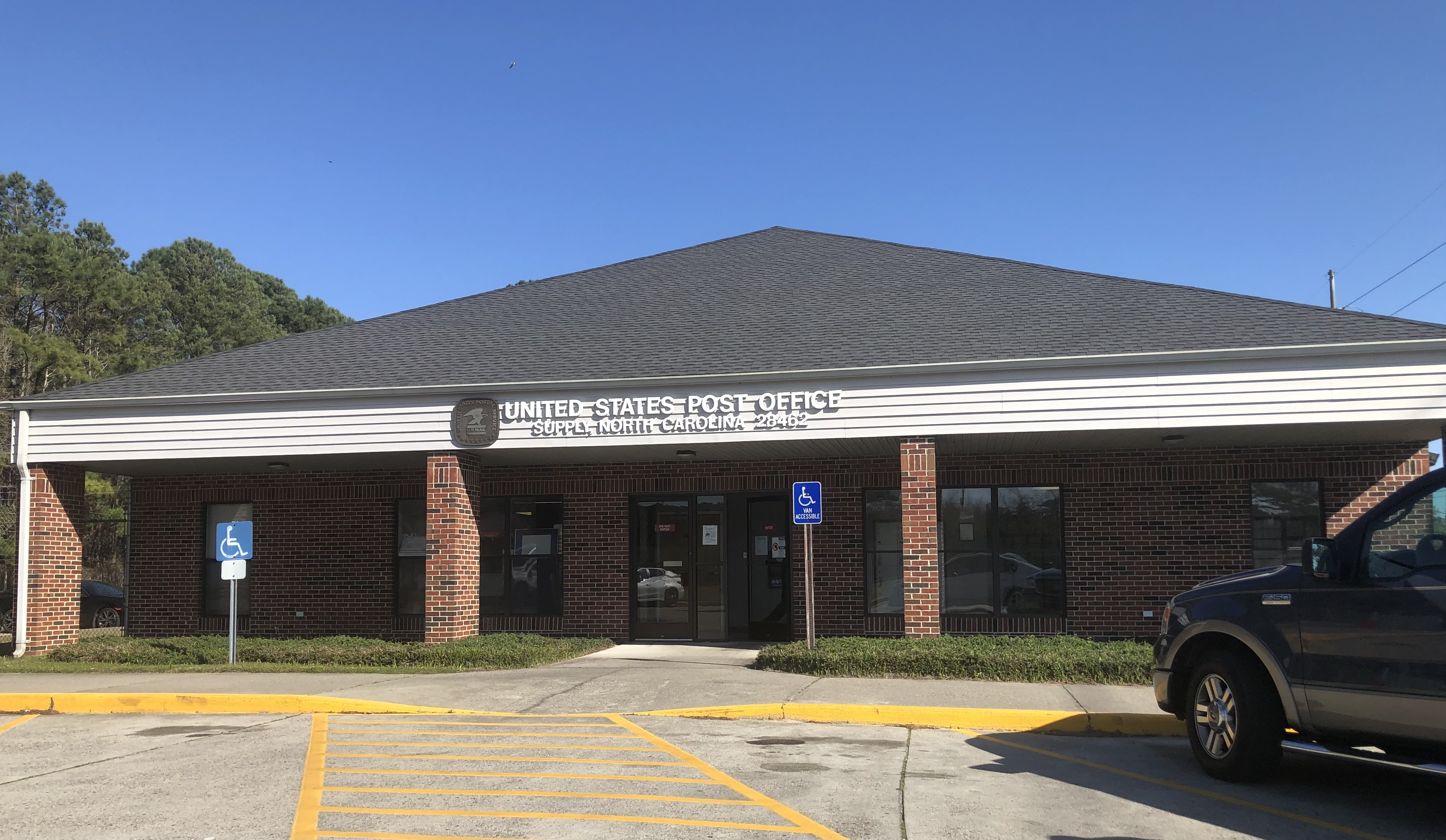
- Post office

- Location in North Carolina Location in the United States
- Country: United States
- State: North Carolina
- County: Brunswick
- Elevation: 26 ft (7.9 m)
- Time zone: UTC-5 (Eastern (EST))
  - Summer (DST): UTC-4 (EDT)
- ZIP code: 28462
- Area codes: 910, 472
- GNIS ID: 1022850

Supply is a small unincorporated community in Brunswick County, North Carolina, United States, located around the intersection of US 17 (Ocean Highway) and NC 211 (Southport-Supply Road/Green Swamp Road). Its name is derived from the use of the Lockwoods Folly River as a trade route in the 18th and 19th centuries. Residents of the nearby beach communities of Holden Beach, Oak Island, Ocean Isle, Caswell Beach, and Sunset Beach often formerly commuted to Supply for goods and other materials. This practice is still common, but development in the town of Southport and in the Intracoastal Waterway commercial districts has made traveling to Supply unnecessary.

== Geography ==
Supply is located midway between the town of Bolivia, the county seat of Brunswick County, and the city of Shallotte, and is just south of the Green Swamp. It is also home to Brunswick Medical Center.

== Education ==
- Supply Elementary School
- Cedar Grove Middle School

== In the media ==
The novel Holly by Albert French is set in Supply, although the novel indicates that there is a courthouse in Supply, but since Supply is not a county seat it is unclear why the novel so indicates. Supply has a fire department at 17 and 211, station 13

== Notable person ==
Chad McCumbee, an ARCA and NASCAR driver, is a notable resident.
