= Red Bug, North Carolina =

- Unincorporated community
- Location in North Carolina Location in the United States
- Coordinates: 33°58′52″N 78°22′27″W
- Country: United States
- State: North Carolina
- County: Brunswick
- Elevation: 20 ft (6.1 m)
- Time zone: UTC-5 (Eastern (EST))
  - Summer (DST): UTC-4 (EDT)
- GNIS ID: 1022189

Red Bug is an unincorporated community in Brunswick County, North Carolina, United States.
