= North Brunswick High School =

American public school in North Carolina

Location
- 114 Scorpion Dr NE; Leland, North Carolina 28451; United States; 34°14′26″N 78°01′27″W

Information
- Type: Public
- Motto: "A New Direction"
- School district: Brunswick County Schools
- CEEB code: 342212
- Principal: Dr. Margaret Rollison
- Teaching staff: 89.39 (FTE)
- Grades: 9–12
- Enrollment: 1,620 (2024–2025)
- Student to teacher ratio: 18.12
- Colors: Navy blue and gold
- Athletics: NCHSAA 7A
- Athletics conference: Carolina Coast 6A/7A/8A
- Mascot: Scrappy the Scorpion
- Team name: Scorpions
- Yearbook: Scorpio
- Website: nbhs.bcswan.net

North Brunswick High School is a public school located in Leland, North Carolina It is one of five high schools in the Brunswick County Schools district. As of the 2016–17 school year, North Brunswick has 1300 students currently enrolled in grades 9 through 12.

== Extracurricular activities ==
=== Sports ===
- Football: Varsity and Junior Varsity
- Men's Soccer: Varsity and Junior Varsity
- Women's Soccer: Varsity
- Volleyball: Varsity and Junior Varsity
- Cheerleading: Varsity and Junior Varsity
- Men's Basketball: Varsity and Junior Varsity
- Women's Basketball: Varsity
- Cross Country
- Wrestling: Varsity and Junior Varsity
- Baseball: Varsity and Junior Varsity
- Softball: Varsity and Junior Varsity
- Track and Field
- Men's and Women's Golf

=== Clubs and societies ===
The school has a wide range of clubs and societies including Science Olympiad, Dance Team, National Honor Society, French Honor Society, Show Choir, After School Chorus, Marching Band, Army JROTC, Anime Club, Journalism, and a Drama Department.

=== Marching band ===
The North Brunswick High School Marching Band, known as the NBHS Marching Scorps, is directed by Patrick Barrett and is celebrated through the town of Leland. In 2011, the band performed in the National 4 July festival in Washington, DC. In 2019, the band was chosen by Senator Thom Tillis to play in the 4th of July Parade in Washington, D.C.

== Notable alumni ==
- Chucky Brown, NBA player and 1995 NBA champion with the Houston Rockets
- Percy Watson, former professional wrestler and WWE commentator
