= South Brunswick High School (North Carolina) =

American public school in North Carolina

Location
- 260 Cougar Drive; Southport, North Carolina 28461; United States; 34°00′41″N 78°02′34″W

Information
- Type: Public
- Motto: Set the Standard
- Established: 1972 (54 years ago)
- CEEB code: 340393
- Principal: Dr. Brad Lewis
- Teaching staff: 67.63 (FTE)
- Enrollment: 1,054 (2025–2026)
- Student to teacher ratio: 17.06
- Campus: 44 acres (180,000 m^{2})
- Colors: Carolina blue and navy
- Athletics conference: 5A; Southeastern 3A/4A/5A Conference
- Team name: Cougars
- Website: sbhs.bcswan.net

South Brunswick High School is a high school within the Brunswick County School District in Southport, North Carolina.

The school is currently the smallest of the three public high schools in Brunswick County Schools. The Cougars are a member of the North Carolina High School Athletic Association (NCHSAA) and are classified as a 5A school. The school is a part of the Southeastern 3A/4A/5A Conference.

South Brunswick High School has the largest district by area in Brunswick County out of the three public high schools. The main areas that are occupied by South Brunswick High School include Winnabow, Leland, Town Creek, Oak Island, Southport, Boliva, Boiling Springs Lakes, Supply, and Varnamtown.

== Extracurricular activities ==
=== Sports ===
- Football: Varsity and Junior Varsity
- Men's Soccer
- Women's Soccer
- Volleyball
- Cheerleading
- Men's and Women's Basketball: Varsity and Junior Varsity
- Cross Country
- Men's and Women's Wrestling
- Baseball
- Softball
- Track and Field
- Men's and Women's Golf
- Swim
- Lacrosse

=== Marching band ===
The South Brunswick High School Marching Band, known as The Pride of the South Coast Cougar Marching Band. The marching band plays at football games, regional competitions, and local parades in Southport and Wilmington, North Carolina.

=== Junior ROTC ===
The Cougar Battalion is South Brunswick Highschool's JROTC Unit. The Cougar Battalion offers 3 different competition teams; Drill Team, Rifle Team, and Archery Team, all of which compete at regional competitions. The Cougar Battalion is part of the U.S. Army Cadet Command's 4th Brigade.

== Notable alumni ==
- Walker Jenkins, MLB player, selected by the Minnesota Twins 5th overall in the 2023 MLB draft
- Quinton McCracken, former MLB player from 1996 to 2005
