= Ash, North Carolina =

- Unincorporated community
- Location within North Carolina Location within the United States
- Coordinates: 34°04′01″N 78°31′35″W
- Country: United States
- State: North Carolina
- County: Brunswick
- Elevation: 49 ft (15 m)
- Time zone: UTC-5 (Eastern (EST))
  - Summer (DST): UTC-4 (EDT)
- ZIP code: 28420
- Area codes: 910, 472
- GNIS feature ID: 1006119

Ash is an unincorporated community in Brunswick County, North Carolina, United States. The community is located on North Carolina Highway 130, 10.3 miles (16.6 km) northwest of Shallotte. Ash has a post office with ZIP code 28420, which opened on November 17, 1884.
