= Cape Fear Regional Jetport =

Airport in North Carolina, United States

Cape Fear Regional Jetport Howie Franklin Field
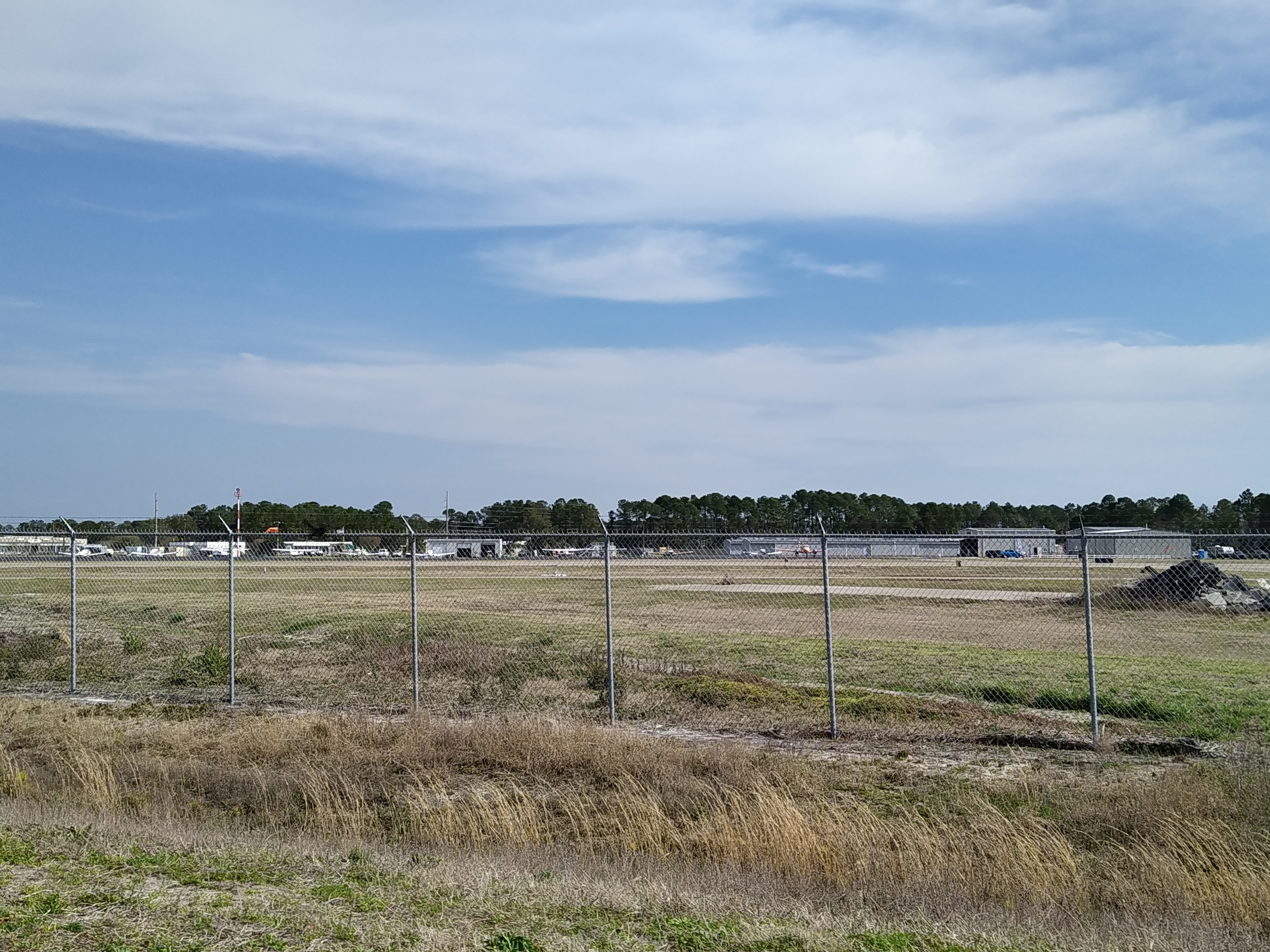
- IATA: none; ICAO: KSUT; FAA LID: SUT

Summary
- Airport type: Public
- Owner: Brunswick County Airport Commission
- Serves: Oak Island, North Carolina
- Elevation AMSL: 26 ft (7.9 m)
- Coordinates: 33°55′51″N 078°04′24″W
- Website: CapeFearJetport.com

Map
- Location of airport in North Carolina

Runways
Direction	Length		Surface
Direction	ft	m	Surface
5/23	5,505	1,678	Concrete

Statistics (2010)
- Aircraft operations: 77,000
- Based aircraft: 77
- Source: Federal Aviation Administration

Cape Fear Regional Jetport (ICAO: KSUT, FAA LID: SUT), also known as Howie Franklin Field, is a public use airport in Brunswick County, North Carolina, United States. It is owned by the Brunswick County Airport Commission and located one nautical mile (2 km) northeast of the central business district of Oak Island, North Carolina. Formerly known as Brunswick County Airport, it is included in the National Plan of Integrated Airport Systems for 2011–2015, which categorized it as a general aviation facility.

Although many U.S. airports use the same three-letter location identifier for the FAA and IATA, this airport is assigned SUT by the FAA but has no designation from the IATA (which assigned SUT to Sumbawanga Airport in Sumbawanga, Tanzania).

== Facilities and aircraft ==
Cape Fear Regional Jetport covers an area of 185 acres (75 ha) at an elevation of 26 feet (8 m) above mean sea level. It has one runway designated 5/23 with an asphalt surface measuring 5,505 by 100 feet (1,678 x 30 m).

For the 12-month period ending November 23, 2010, the airport had 77,000 aircraft operations, an average of 210 per day: 96% general aviation and 4% military. At that time there were 67 aircraft based at this airport: 92.5% single-engine, 3% multi-engine, 3% ultralight, and 1.5% helicopter.

== See also ==
- List of airports in North Carolina
