= Holden Beach, North Carolina =

- Seaside town
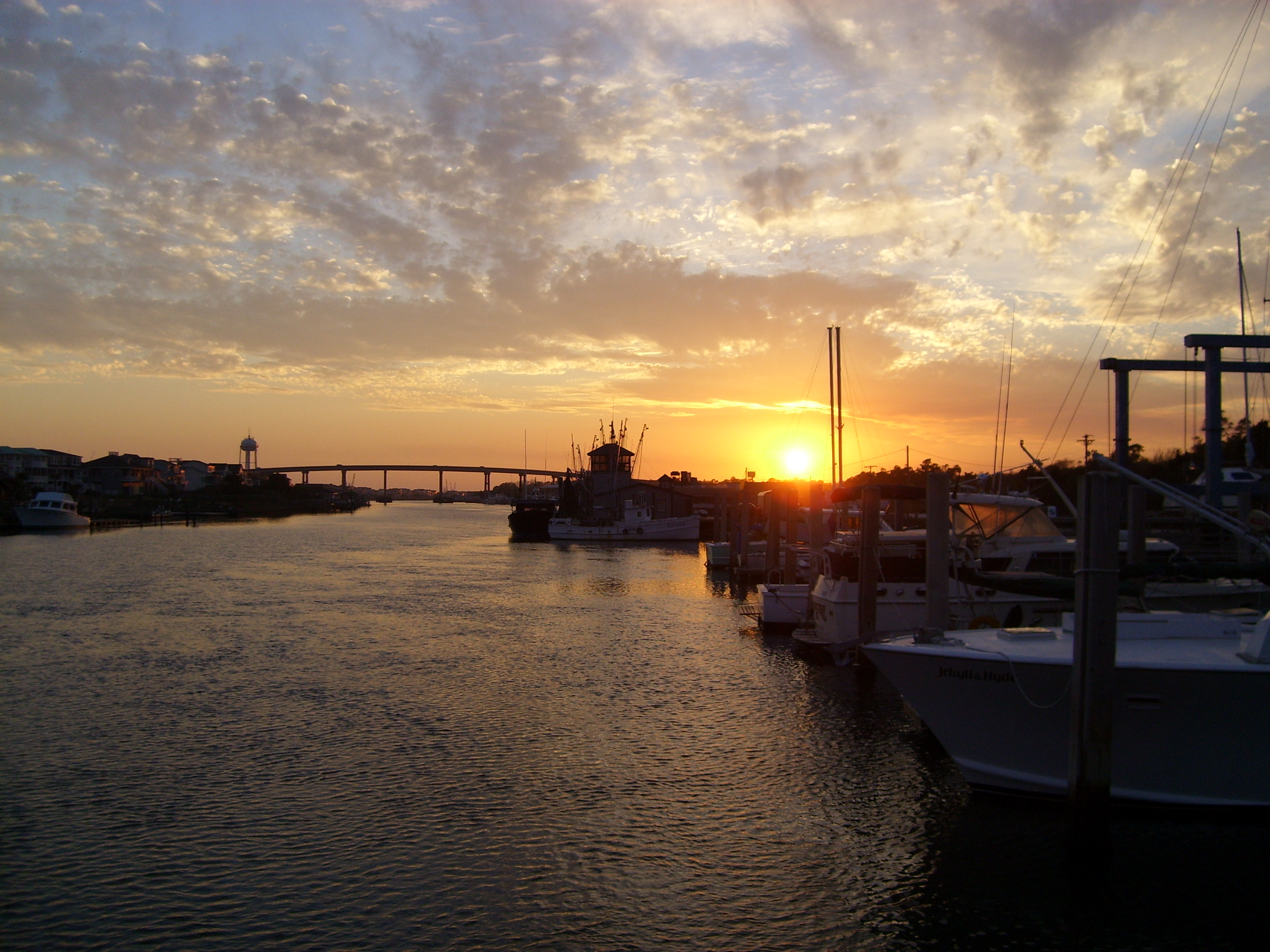
- Intracoastal Waterway with Holden Beach Bridge in the background

- Flag Seal
- Motto: "The Family Beach"
- Location within North Carolina
- Coordinates: 33°54′42″N 78°19′8″W
- Country: United States
- State: North Carolina
- County: Brunswick
- Township: Lockwoods Folly Township
- Incorporated: 1969

Area
  - Total: 3.75 sq mi (9.70 km^{2})
  - Land: 3.03 sq mi (7.86 km^{2})
  - Water: 0.71 sq mi (1.85 km^{2})
- Elevation: 3 ft (0.91 m)

Population (2020)
  - Total: 921
  - Density: 303.6/sq mi (117.23/km^{2})
- Time zone: UTC-5 (Eastern (EST))
  - Summer (DST): UTC-4 (EDT)
- ZIP code: 28462
- Area codes: 910, 472
- FIPS code: 37-31960
- GNIS feature ID: 2405849
- Website: www.hbtownhall.com

Holden Beach is a seaside town in Brunswick County, North Carolina. As of the 2020 census, Holden Beach had a population of 921. It is part of the Wilmington, North Carolina Metropolitan Statistical Area.

== Geography ==
Holden Beach is located in southern Brunswick County. The town occupies an 8-mile-long (13 km) barrier island on the Atlantic Ocean, bounded by Shallotte Inlet to the west, Lockwoods Folly Inlet to the east, and the Intracoastal Waterway to the north. One road, North Carolina Highway 130, crosses the Intracoastal Waterway to connect Holden Beach with the mainland. Via NC 130, it is 10 miles (16 km) northwest to the town of Shallotte.

According to the United States Census Bureau, the town of Holden Beach has a total area of 3.4 square miles (8.9 km^{2}), of which 2.7 square miles (7.0 km^{2}) is land and 0.69 square miles (1.8 km^{2}) (20.72%) is water.

== History ==
Before the American Revolution, early settlers seeking land near Lockwood's Folly River applied for patents and received warrants for surveys of selected tracts. Upon payment of fifty shillings for each 100 acres (400,000 m^{2}), the warrantee could receive a permanent grant for Royal Governor Arthur Dobbs.

Benjamin Holden in 1756 bought four mainland tracts and the island between his plantation and the ocean. This island extended from Lockwood's Folly Inlet west 6 miles (10 km) to Bacon Inlet. Benjamin and his sons used the island for fishing and cattle grazing. During the Civil War Holden Beach and Lockwood's Folley Inlet became the resting place of several shipwrecks: the Confederate blockade runners CSS Elizabeth and CSS Bendigo and the Union blockade ship USS Iron Age. The remains of the Bendigo can be seen on the eastern end of the island during the periods of low tide. Its wreck is marked with an orange navigation warning buoy and is located between Holden Beach and Oak Island. While the vessel's wreck is roughly 200 feet (61 m) long, only the base of the engine's exhaust funnel and a small portion of superstructure are visible above water. The ship is easily reached during low tide by swimming, but the wreck is extensively covered in abandoned fishing hooks and gear that may present potential hazards.

John Holden, Benjamin's grandson, started a commercial fishery on the island and in 1924 surveyed a section which he called Holden Beach Resort, the plat of which represented the first subdivision of beach property in Brunswick County. In 1925, he built the Holden Beach bridge; it was subsequently destroyed by the Inland Waterway construction. He negotiated with the state of North Carolina for the institution of a public ferry to reach the island, but he did not live to see the ferry begin operation in 1934.

Luther S. Holden, John's son, operated the old hotel that his father had built, started development of the property nearby and became a permanent resident in 1946. Soon afterwards, Luther S. Holden's son, John F. Holden, began building other homes and renting them to vacationers. A bit later, other smaller developments were started west of the ferry location. In the early 1940s one could buy an oceanfront house with the land for about $600. John F. Holden and his wife Johnsie actually began the development of Holden Beach that would slowly become a resort area. The Holdens had two sons, Lyn and J. Alan Holden, the seventh generation of Holdens to live on Holden Beach.

In 1954, the island had about 300 homes and a turnbridge. After that year's destructive Hurricane Hazel, which hit on October 15, 1954, the rebuilding was slow. On February 14, 1969, the island was incorporated, and on May 13, 1986, the Town of Holden Beach dedicated a new high-rise steel and concrete bridge, allowing better access to the then more than 1,900 homes on the island.

The one church on the island, the interdenominational Holden Beach Chapel, began as a Bible study in the home of Luther S. Holden and several other resident families on the island. Eventually land was donated and the church was erected in the 1940s. It was destroyed by Hurricane Hazel in 1954 but was rebuilt shortly thereafter. Today the chapel serves the many hundreds who live on and around Holden Beach and the numbers of visitors who vacation on the island during the summer months.

== Government ==
The mayor of Holden Beach is J. Alan Holden and the mayor pro-tem is Gerald Brown. The town commissioners are Woody Tyner, Brian Murdock, Mike Sullivan, Rick Smith, and Pat Kwiatkowski.

== Demographics ==
Historical population
Census	Pop.	Note	%±
1970	136		—
1980	232		70.6%
1990	626		169.8%
2000	787		25.7%
2010	575		−26.9%
2020	921		60.2%
U.S. Decennial Census

As of the census of 2010, there were 575 people, 296 households, and 204 families residing in the town. There were 2,335 housing units with 296 being occupied and 2,039 being vacant. The racial makeup of the town was 99.3% White, 0.9% African American, 0.2% Native American, and 0.7% from two or more races. Hispanic or Latino of any race were 2.4% of the population.

There were 296 households, out of which 7.1% had children under the age of 18 living with them, 62.8% were married couples living together, 4.4% had a female householder with no husband present, and 31.1% were non-families. 25.7% of all households were made up of individuals, and 14.5% had someone living alone who was 65 years of age or older. The average household size was 1.94 and the average family size was 2.28.

In the town, the population was spread out, with 6.4% under the age of 18, 54.3% from 18 to 64, and 39.3% who were 65 years of age or older. The median age was 62.1 years. The male population was 278 or 48.3%. The female population was 297 or 51.7%.

The economic characteristics are based on the American Community Survey from 2007 to 2011. The median income for a household in the town was $52,206, and the median income for a family was $77,639. Males had a median income of $52,214 versus $63,1285 for females. The per capita income for the town was $46,994. About 10.8% of families and 9.2% of the population were below the poverty line.

Preceded by Oak Island	Beaches of Southeastern North Carolina	Succeeded by Ocean Isle Beach
