= Oak Island, North Carolina =

Town in the United States

- Town
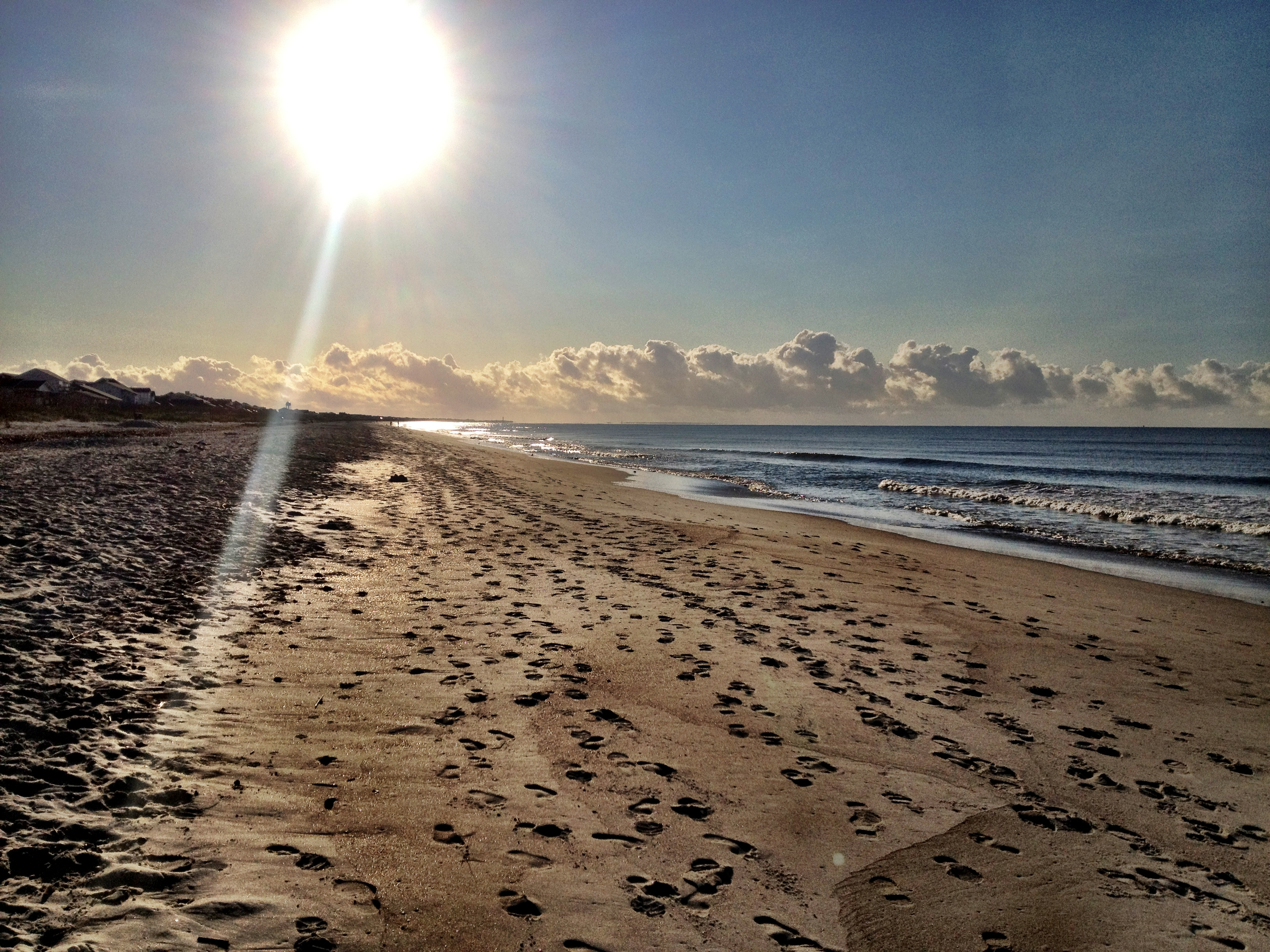
- Oak Island Beach

- Flag Seal
- Motto: "A Place to Coast"
- Location within the state of North Carolina Oak Island (the United States)
- Coordinates: 33°54′48″N 78°05′29″W
- Country: United States
- State: North Carolina
- County: Brunswick

Government
  - Mayor: Christopher Brown

Area
  - Total: 20.63 sq mi (53.43 km^{2})
  - Land: 19.27 sq mi (49.91 km^{2})
  - Water: 1.36 sq mi (3.52 km^{2})
- Elevation: 16 ft (4.9 m)

Population (2020)
  - Total: 8,396
  - Estimate (2022): 9,322
  - Density: 435.7/sq mi (168.21/km^{2})
- Time zone: UTC-5 (Eastern (EST))
  - Summer (DST): UTC-4 (EDT)
- ZIP code: 28465
- Area codes: 910, 472
- FIPS code: 37-48345
- GNIS feature ID: 2407020
- Website: www.oakislandnc.gov

Oak Island is a seaside town located in the southeastern corner of North Carolina, United States. Part of Brunswick County, the major portion of the town is on Oak Island which it shares with Caswell Beach. Founded in 1999 as the result of the consolidation of two existing towns, Oak Island's main industry is tourism. Per the 2020 census, the town has a permanent population of 8,396 while its summer population is near 50,000. It along with the town of Caswell Beach is part of the Wilmington, NC, Metropolitan Statistical Area.

== History ==
Oak Island, on which much of the town sits, has been inhabited since the early 19th century when Fort Caswell was constructed on its east end in 1838. The island developed slowly, but by the late 1930s it began attracting people from nearby Southport with fox hunting popular in the areas along the Intracoastal Waterway (ICW). In 1954, Hurricane Hazel struck, leaving only five buildings standing on the west end of the island The island recovered quickly however, and the towns of Long Beach and Yaupon Beach were incorporated. Along with this increasing level of development came strident demands for a reliable crossing of the ICW to provide access to the island.

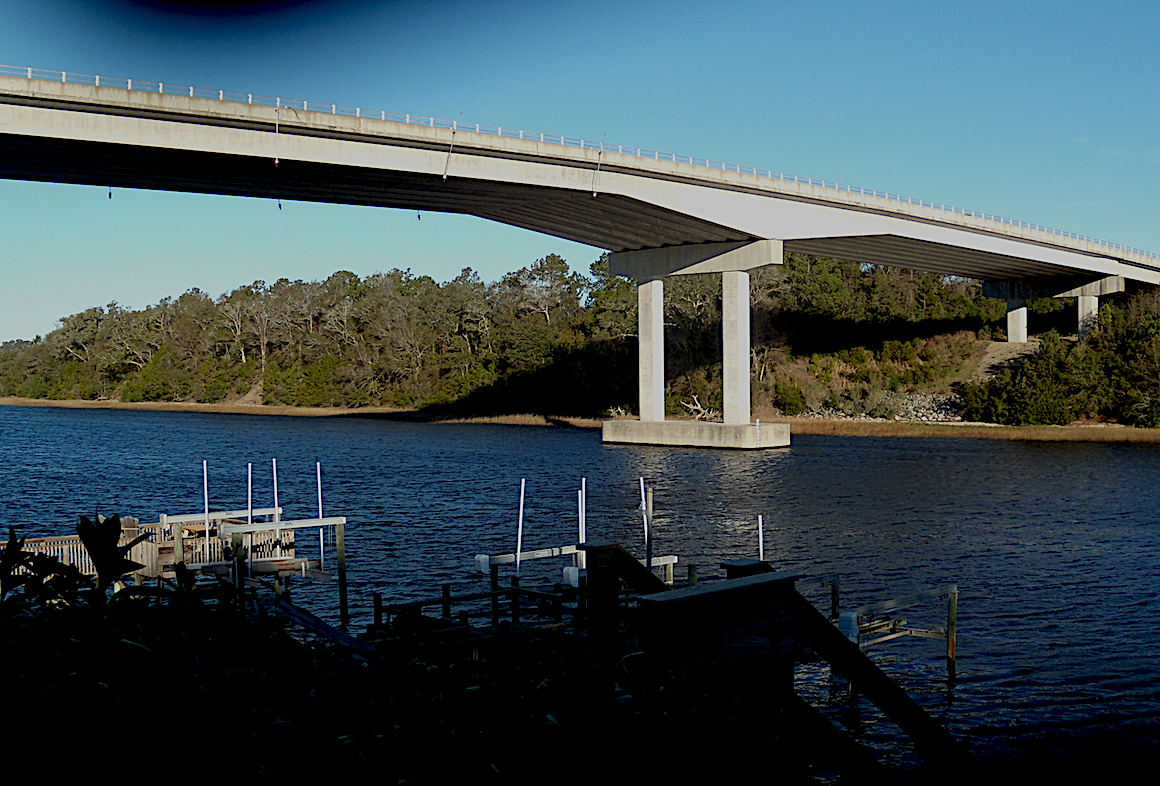
Swain's Cut Bridge

When the ICW was completed in the late 1930s, a swingbridge initially provided this service. Destroyed by a barge strike in 1971, construction of the high rise Barbee Bridge began almost immediately; it opened for traffic in 1975 (interim service included a ferry and pontoon bridge). A second high rise structure, the Swain's Cut Bridge, was built over the ICW to the island in 2010. In 1999, Long Beach and Yaupon Beach, decided to consolidate into the Town of Oak Island, and while Caswell Beach considered the matter, it opted to stay independent. Immediately after the new town got up and running, it began to either incorporate or obtain Extra Territorial Jurisdiction (ETJ) on properties located to its north on the mainland.

== Geography ==
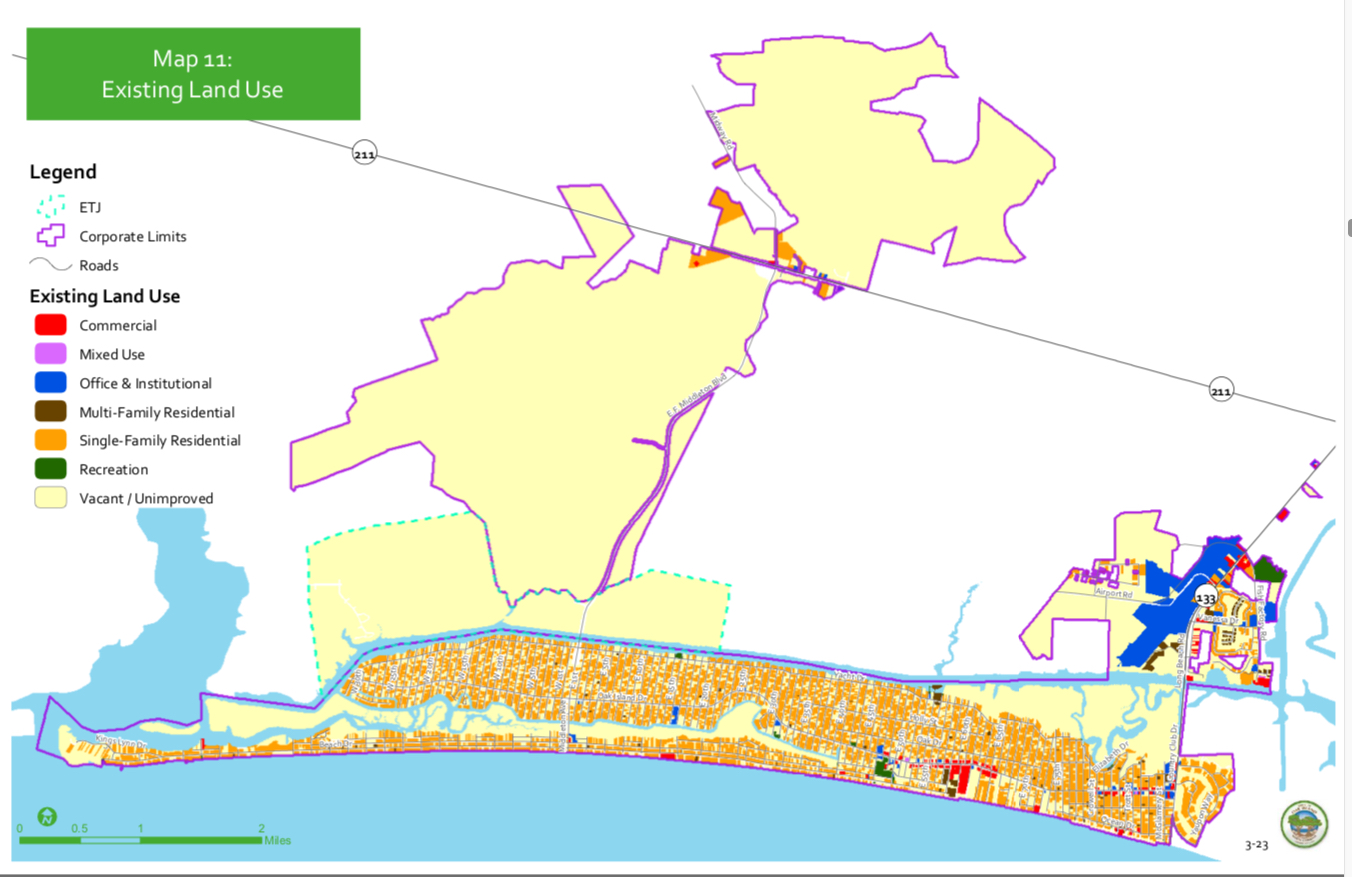
Oak Island Growth since 1999

Oak Island is located in southeastern Brunswick County. According to the United States Census Bureau, the town has a total area of 19.9 square miles (51.6 km^{2}), of which 18.5 square miles (48.0 km^{2}) is land and 1.4 square miles (3.6 km^{2}) (7.02%) is water. It is bordered to the south by the Atlantic Ocean, to the east by Caswell Beach, to the north across the ICW in part by the town of St. James, and to the west by the town of Holden Beach across the Lockwood Folly Inlet. Additions to the town in the 20 years since it was formed in 1999, located on the mainland, consist of the following:

•Property on both sides of Long Beach Rd. (NC 133) to include the Cape Fear Regional Jetport, and South Harbour Village with its nine-hole golf course and marina.

• Land mostly west of Middleton Blvd. (NC 906) either planned for or under development, the largest of which was the ill-fated Seawatch complex (1738 of the planned 4171 lots are in Oak Island).

• Parcels north of Southport-Supply Rd. (NC 211), the most prominent being Midway Commons Shopping Center.

=== Climate ===
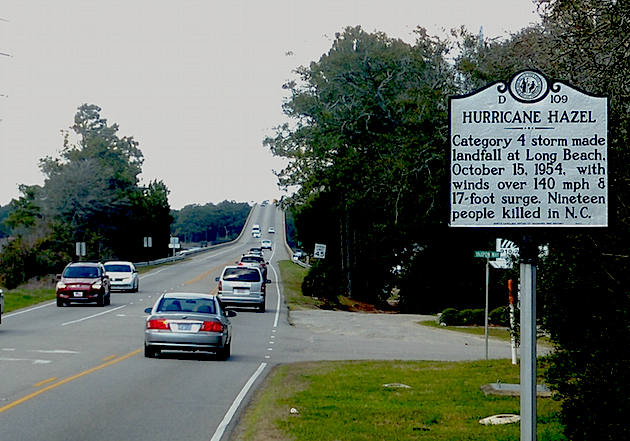
Hurricane Hazel Marker

Summers in the town are hot and humid with an average temperature of 85 °F (29 °C), although the beach front is cooled much of the time by sea breezes (the prevailing winds are from the southwest). Ocean water temperatures range from the 50s in winter to the mid 80s in summer. Winters are moderate with an average temperature in the 50s (°F), albeit with brief cold periods. Rain occurs throughout the year with average annual rainfall approximately 57 inches (140 cm), 45% of this falling between June and September.

Tropical storms are a continuing source of concern with Hurricane Hazel being the most devastating. In the 1996−1999 period, four major hurricanes (Bertha, Fran, Bonnie, and Floyd) made landfall with Hurricane Floyd having significant effect on the town. More recently, in October 2016, the eye of Hurricane Matthew passed almost directly over the town inflicting extensive damage to the dune system, and in September 2018, Hurricane Florence caused severe flooding and wind damage in addition to washing away large amounts of beach sand.

In the early morning hours of August 4, 2020, Hurricane Isaias hit Oak Island as a Category 1 hurricane; the storm surge was around 9 feet, increased by a corresponding high tide. The fishing pier and its hotel, many businesses, and hundreds of homes were damaged, and in many places sand from shoreside dunes was pushed inland for three blocks. An estimated 75−100 vehicles were damaged; floating cars were a common sight at the height of the storm. Power was finally cut off as a safety precaution. In the succeeding weeks, a mandatory evacuation order and damage to rental properties prevented tourism, which is a major source of income for many residents.

== Government ==
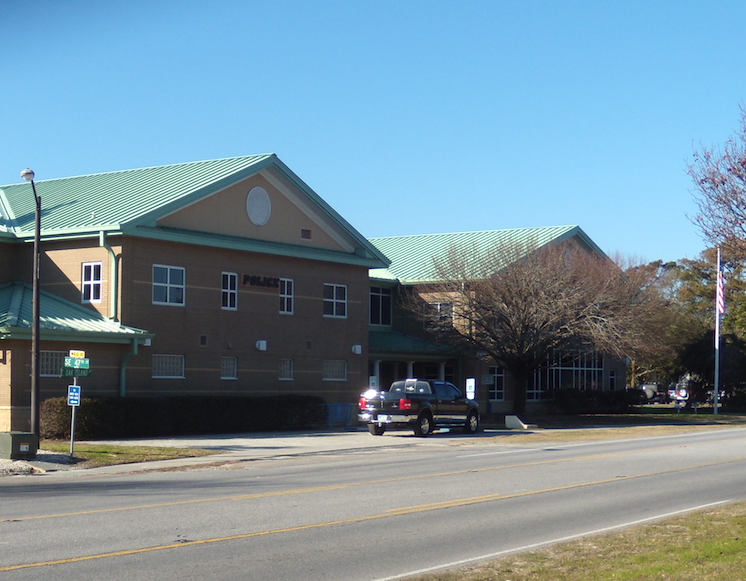
Oak Island Town Hall

The town government operates under a Council-Manager type system where various officials have authority to make decisions on services, revenues and expenditures in accordance with a state issued charter. The council is Oak Island's governing body and consists of five Commissioners and the Mayor. It sets the Town's policy, enacts ordinances and adopts the annual budget. The actual operation of the town's government is accomplished by the Town Manager who is hired by the council. Town Hall is collocated in the center of the island with the Oak Island Police Department, while units of the Oak Island Fire Department and Brunswick County EMS are deployed in various areas of the Town to respond to emergencies

== Attractions ==
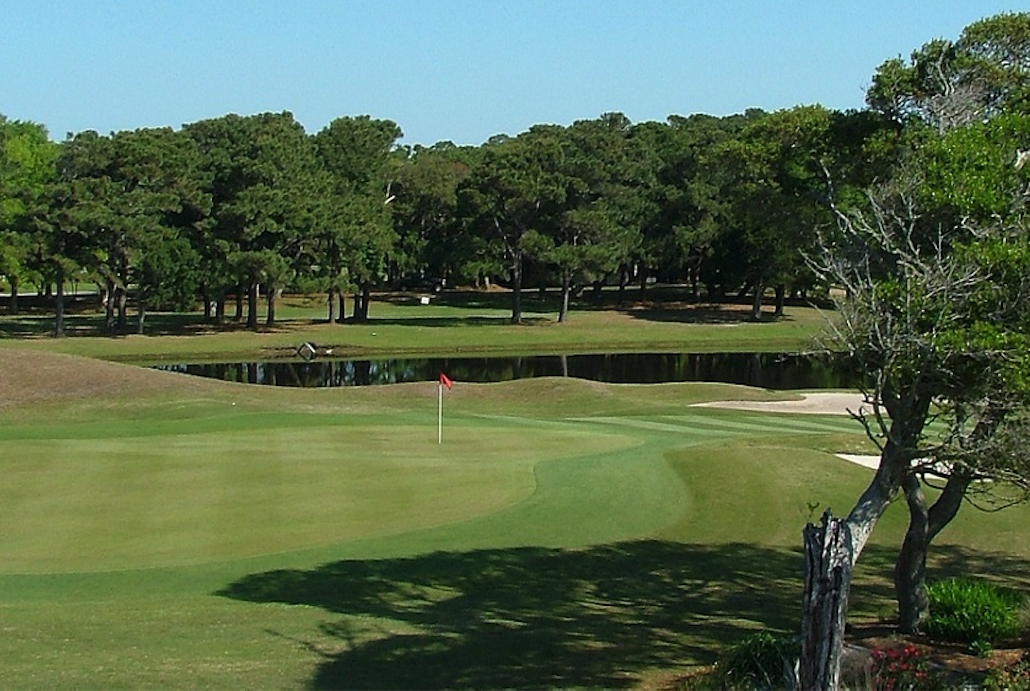
Oak Island Golf Club 18th green

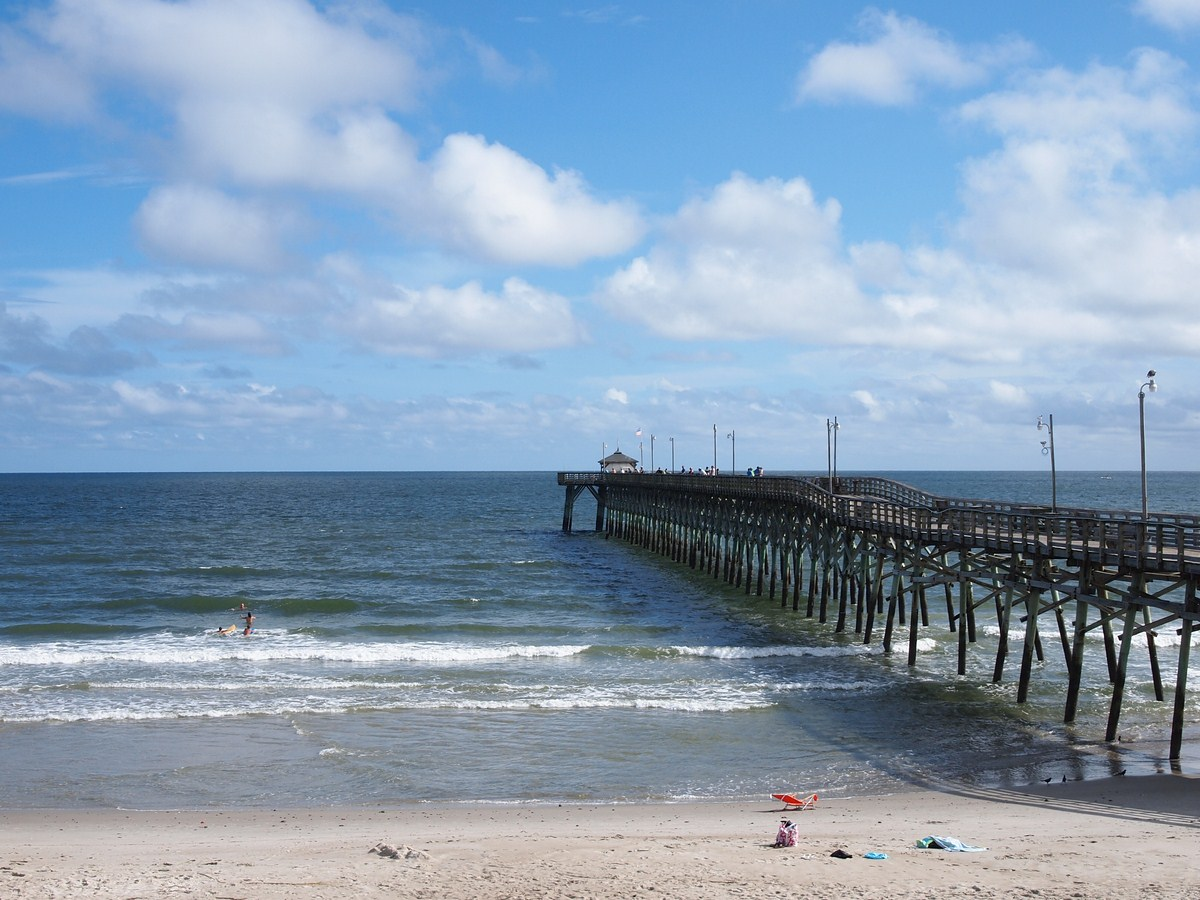
Ocean Crest Fishing Pier

Primarily a family beach type locale, the island also provides many other types of recreational activity. The Oak Island Golf Club course and its related practice facilities are open to the public and an outdoor swimming pool is available for its members' use during the summer. Two public fishing piers jut out into the Atlantic Ocean while motor/sail boats moored to piers dot the ICW as well as the Davis Canal and Montgomery Slough. South Harbour Village has a nine-hole public golf course and a marina on the ICW with 1,000 linear feet of alongside dockage. All these waterways also attract a large number of kayakers.

The Oak Island Recreation Center located mid-island provides both indoor and outdoor exercise facilities and rents out sports equipment and amenities like balloon tire, beach wheelchairs. Popular sporting events include the "Run Oak Island" Marathon held in February which also features a half-marathon along with a 5K and one mile run. And then in April, the Southport/Oak Island Chamber of Commerce sponsors the Oak Island Lighthouse Run which includes a half marathon, 10K, 5K and a one-mile fun run.

As for other activities, the town puts on an ocean front fireworks display as part of its Fourth of July festivities, and a parade down Oak Island Drive just before Christmas, while the Oak Island Library hosts a wide variety of events to include "Socrates Cafe" and "Meet the Author" programs.

=== Major highways ===
- NC 133
- NC 906
- NC 211

== Demographics ==
Historical population
Census	Pop.	Note	%±
2000	6,571		—
2010	6,783		3.2%
2020	8,396		23.8%
2025 (est.)	9,337	▲	11.2%
U.S. Decennial Census

=== 2020 census ===
As of the 2020 census, Oak Island had a population of 8,396. The median age was 60.4 years. About 8.8% of residents were under age 18, and 38.0% were age 65 or older. For every 100 females there were 89.4 males, and for every 100 females age 18 and over there were 88.4 males age 18 and over.

According to the 2020 census, 98.6% of residents lived in urban areas and 1.4% lived in rural areas.

There were 4,237 households in the town, and 11.5% of households had children under age 18. Of all households, 54.5% were married-couple households, 14.1% were households with a male householder and no spouse or partner present, and 25.4% were households with a female householder and no spouse or partner present. About 30.2% of households were made up of individuals, and 16.9% had someone living alone who was age 65 or older.

There were 9,910 housing units, of which 57.2% were vacant. The homeowner vacancy rate was 2.7%, and the rental vacancy rate was 27.4%.

Oak Island racial composition
Race	Number	Percentage
White (non-Hispanic)	7,782	92.69%
Black or African American (non-Hispanic)	68	0.81%
Native American	34	0.4%
Asian	43	0.51%
Pacific Islander	3	0.04%
Other/Mixed	320	3.81%
Hispanic or Latino	146	1.74%

=== 2017 estimates ===
As of 2017, the Census Bureau estimated the town's median household income at $57,670, with per capita income of $38,176. The average household size was estimated at 2.05 persons. About 8.6% of the population were below the poverty line.

The town's estimated 2017 age distribution is shown below.

Age Group	Percent of Population By Age
< 18	12.5%
18 to 65	56.8%
> 65	30.7%

== In popular culture ==
The fourth novel of North Carolina novelist Wiley Cash, When Ghosts Come Home, is a murder mystery set in Oak Island.
