= Brunswick County, North Carolina =

County in the United States

- County
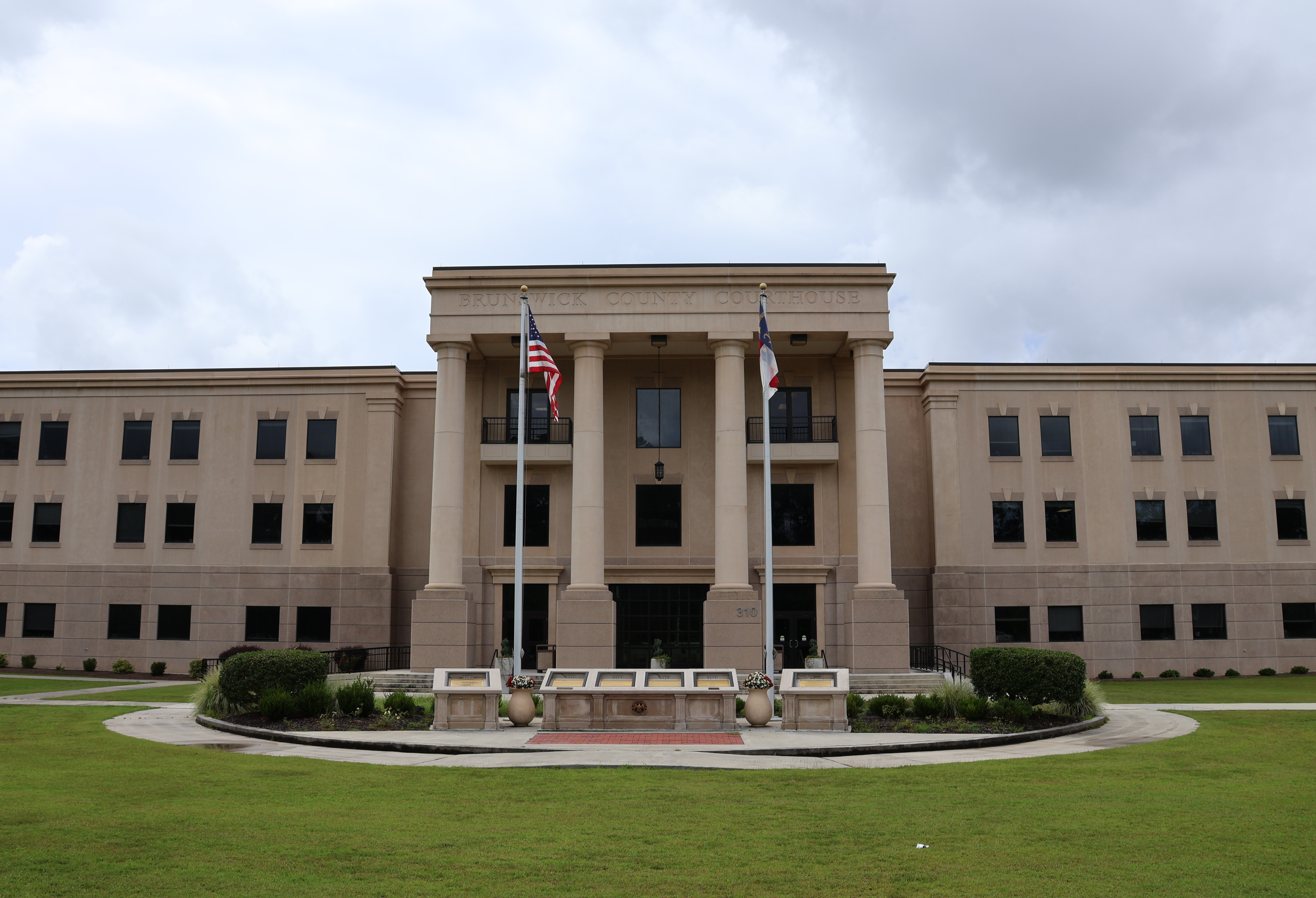
- Brunswick County Courthouse

- Flag Seal

- Location within the U.S. state of North Carolina
- Interactive map of Brunswick County, North Carolina
- Coordinates: 34.038754°N 78.227765°W
- Country: United States
- State: North Carolina
- Founded: March 9, 1764
- Named for: Duchy of Brunswick-Lüneburg
- Seat: Bolivia
- Largest community: Leland

Area
  - Total: 1,049.543 sq mi (2,718.30 km^{2})
  - Land: 850.069 sq mi (2,201.67 km^{2})
  - Water: 199.474 sq mi (516.64 km^{2}) 19.00%

Population (2020)
  - Total: 136,693
  - Estimate (2025): 174,702 ▲
  - Density: 160.8/sq mi (62.1/km^{2})
- Time zone: UTC−5 (Eastern)
  - Summer (DST): UTC−4 (EDT)
- Congressional district: 7th
- Website: www.brunswickcountync.gov

Brunswick County is the southernmost county in the U.S. state of North Carolina. As of the 2020 census, the population was 136,693. Its population was only 73,143 in 2000, making it the fastest-growing county in the state, and ninth fastest in the nation. With a nominal growth rate of approximately 47% in ten years, much of the growth is centered in the eastern section of the county in the suburbs of Wilmington such as Leland, Belville and Southport. The county seat is Bolivia, which at a population of around 150 people is among the least populous county seats in the state.

Brunswick County is part of the Wilmington, NC Metropolitan Statistical Area. From 2013 to 2023, the county was part of the Myrtle Beach-Conway-North Myrtle Beach, SC Metropolitan Statistical Area. During that time, Brunswick County and Wilmington area leaders disputed the change, including many government leaders like Senator Richard Burr. Ultimately, their efforts were a success because the county was added back into the MSA after a 2023 realignment.

Much of the economy of the county is built around tourism, with beach communities lying along the south-facing beaches past Cape Fear such as Bald Head Island (the southernmost point of North Carolina) and Oak Island being popular destinations. Calabash, on the border of South Carolina, is renowned for its fried seafood, with "Calabash-style" restaurants dotting the region. The proximity to Cinespace Wilmington in nearby Wilmington has made Brunswick County a popular filming location for many movies and TV shows.

== History ==
The county was formed in 1764 from parts of Bladen County and New Hanover County. It was named for the colonial port of Brunswick Town, which itself was named for George I, the King of England and Duke of Brunswick.

Following the destruction of Brunswick Town during the American Revolutionary War, the southern portion of the county increased in population, with the town of Smithville being incorporated in 1805. Three years later it was designated the county seat. During the antebellum era, Brunswick experienced some growth. The slave labor force increased to serve plantations in their production of naval stores, corn, cotton, and rice; by 1860 over 44 percent of the county's population were slaves. During the American Civil War, forces of the Confederate State of America erected Fort Anderson near the ruins of Brunswick Town to defend against federal attacks on the Cape Fear River and the Port of Wilmington. Brunswick County did not experience much growth in the latter half of the 19th century. Smithville was renamed Southport in 1887. Beginning in the 1930s, development along the county's beaches occurred, and between 1955 and 1975, six communities on the county's barrier islands were incorporated.

== Geography ==
According to the United States Census Bureau, the county has a total area of 1,049.543 square miles (2,718.30 km^{2}), of which 850.069 square miles (2,201.67 km^{2}) is land and 199.474 square miles (516.64 km^{2}) (19.00%) is water. It is the fourth-largest county in North Carolina by total area. The Brunswick River and the Cape Fear River provide access to the Atlantic Ocean.

The Brunswick Nuclear Generating Station is to the north of Southport.

=== Hydrogeology ===
The principal ground-water-supply sources for Brunswick County are the surficial aquifer for domestic supplies and the Castle Hayne aquifer for municipal supplies.

=== State and local protected area/sites ===
- Bald Head Island Conservancy
- Bald Head Island Natural Area
- Bald Head Woods Maritime Forest Preserve
- Bird Island Reserve
- Brunswick County Botanical Garden
- Brunswick Nature Park
- Brunswick Town/Fort Anderson State Historic Site
- Columbus County Game Land (part)
- Ev-Henwood Nature Preserve
- Fort Caswell Historic District
- Green Swamp Game Land
- Green Swamp Preserve (part)
- Juniper Creek Game Land (part)
- Museum of Coastal Carolina
- Myrtle Head Savanna
- North Carolina Maritime Museum at Southport (Fort Johnston also located on property)
- Oak Island Lighthouse
- Old Baldy Lighthouse and Smith Island Museum
- Orton Creek Preserve
- South of Onslow County Mechanical Harvesting of Oysters Prohibited Area (part)
- Zekes Island Estuarine Reserve Dedicated Nature Preserve (part)
- Zeke's Island Reserve (part)

=== Major water bodies ===
- Alligator Creek
- Atlantic Ocean (North Atlantic Ocean)
- Brunswick River
- Cape Fear River
- Elizabeth River
- Frying Pan Shoals
- Intracoastal Waterway
- Lockwood Folly River
- Little River
- Long Bay
- North Lake
- Northeast Cape Fear River
- Onslow Bay
- Orton Pond
- Patricia Lake
- Saucepan Creek
- Shallotte River
- Town Creek
- Waccamaw River

=== Major islands ===
- Bald Head Island
- Bird Island
- Eagles Island
- Oak Island

=== Major beaches ===
- Caswell Beach
- Holden Beach
- Long Beach
- Ocean Isle Beach
- Sunset Beach
- Yaupon Beach

=== Adjacent counties ===
- Pender County – north
- New Hanover County – east
- Columbus County – west-northwest
- Horry County, South Carolina – west

=== Major highways ===
- Future I-74
- I-140 / NC 140
- US 17
- US 17 Bus. (Bolivia)
- US 17 Bus. (Shallotte)
- US 74
- US 76
- US 421
- NC 87
- NC 130
- NC 130 Bus.
- NC 133
- NC 179
- NC 179 Bus.
- NC 211
- NC 904
- NC 906

=== Major infrastructure ===
- Bald Head Island Ferry, private ferry that serves Bald Head Island
- Cape Fear Regional Jetport, near Oak Island
- Military Ocean Terminal Sunny Point, military terminal near Southport
- Odell Williamson Municipal Airport
- Southport–Fort Fisher Ferry (to New Hanover County)

== Demographics ==
Historical population
Census	Pop.	Note	%±
1790	3,071		—
1800	4,110		33.8%
1810	4,778		16.3%
1820	5,480		14.7%
1830	6,516		18.9%
1840	6,255		−4.0%
1850	7,272		16.3%
1860	8,406		15.6%
1870	7,754		−7.8%
1880	9,389		21.1%
1890	10,900		16.1%
1900	12,657		16.1%
1910	14,432		14.0%
1920	14,876		3.1%
1930	15,818		6.3%
1940	17,125		8.3%
1950	19,238		12.3%
1960	20,278		5.4%
1970	24,223		19.5%
1980	35,777		47.7%
1990	50,985		42.5%
2000	73,143		43.5%
2010	107,431		46.9%
2020	136,693		27.2%
2025 (est.)	174,702	▲	27.8%
U.S. Decennial Census; 1790–1960 1900–1990; 1990–2000 2010–2020

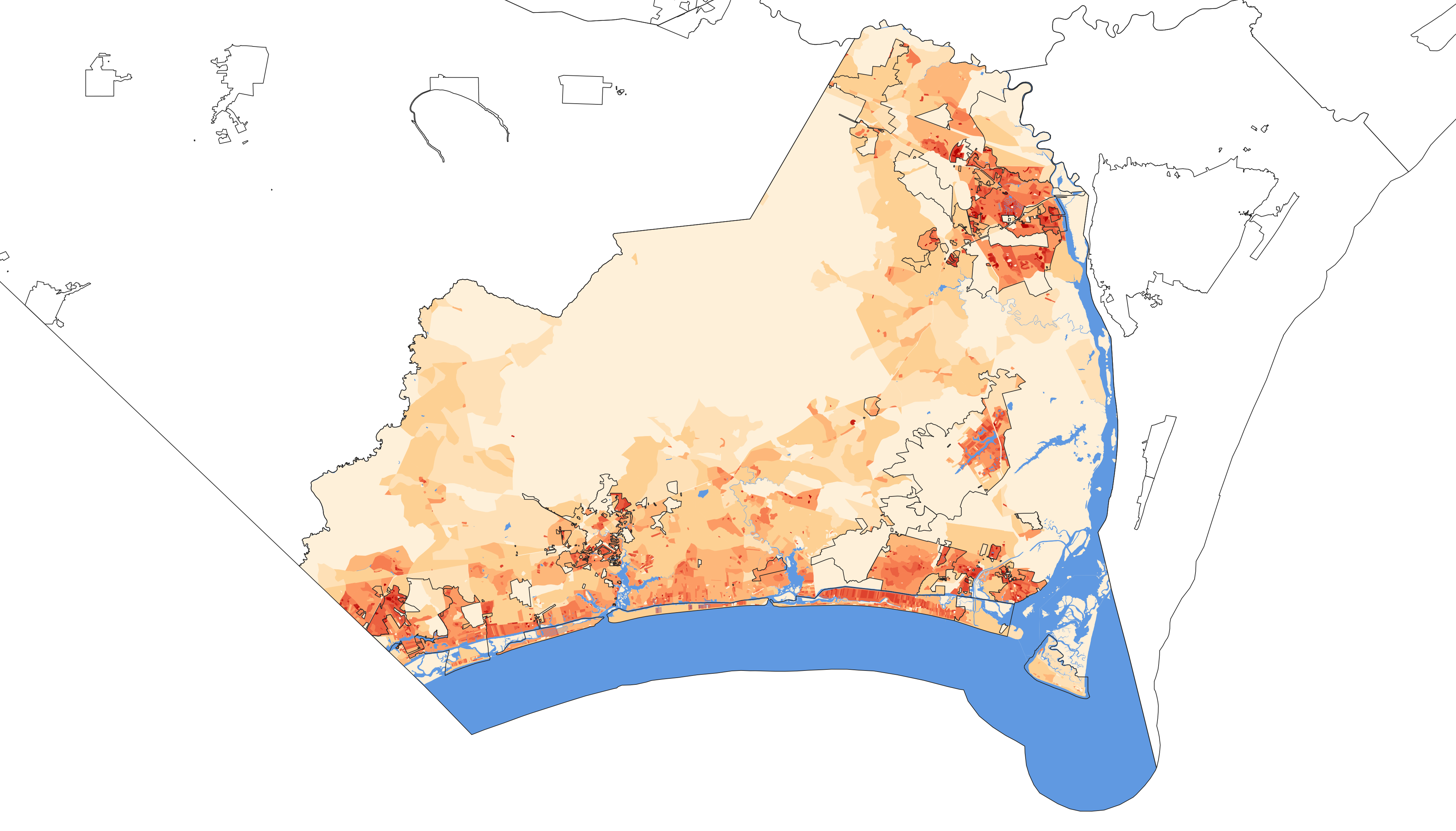
2020 population density of Brunswick County NC by census block

=== 2020 census ===
As of the 2020 census, there were 136,693 people, 61,496 households, and 42,359 families residing in the county. The population density was 160.8 inhabitants per square mile (62.1/km^{2}).

The median age was 56.5 years. 14.7% of residents were under the age of 18 and 34.4% of residents were 65 years of age or older. For every 100 females there were 91.9 males, and for every 100 females age 18 and over there were 89.7 males age 18 and over.

The racial makeup of the county was 82.2% White, 8.4% Black or African American, 0.7% American Indian and Alaska Native, 0.7% Asian, 0.1% Native Hawaiian and Pacific Islander, 2.6% from some other race, and 5.4% from two or more races. Hispanic or Latino residents of any race comprised 5.4% of the population.

63.6% of residents lived in urban areas, while 36.4% lived in rural areas.

There were 61,496 households in the county, of which 18.4% had children under the age of 18 living in them. Of all households, 55.9% were married-couple households, 14.0% were households with a male householder and no spouse or partner present, and 24.2% were households with a female householder and no spouse or partner present. About 25.9% of all households were made up of individuals and 14.2% had someone living alone who was 65 years of age or older.

There were 88,330 housing units, of which 30.4% were vacant. Among occupied housing units, 81.9% were owner-occupied and 18.1% were renter-occupied. The homeowner vacancy rate was 2.1% and the rental vacancy rate was 17.9%.

=== Racial and ethnic composition ===
Brunswick County, North Carolina – Racial and ethnic composition Note: the US Census treats Hispanic/Latino as an ethnic category. This table excludes Latinos from the racial categories and assigns them to a separate category. Hispanics/Latinos may be of any race.
Race / Ethnicity (NH = Non-Hispanic)	Pop 1980	Pop 1990	Pop 2000	Pop 2010	Pop 2020	% 1980	% 1990	% 2000	% 2010	% 2020
White alone (NH)	27,117	41,120	59,354	86,818	110,716	75.79%	80.65%	81.15%	80.81%	81.00%
Black or African American alone (NH)	8,161	9,172	10,459	12,120	11,392	22.81%	17.99%	14.30%	11.28%	8.33%
Native American or Alaska Native alone (NH)	113	234	473	652	743	0.32%	0.46%	0.65%	0.61%	0.54%
Asian alone (NH)	60	75	192	560	890	0.17%	0.15%	0.26%	0.52%	0.65%
Native Hawaiian or Pacific Islander alone (NH)	x	x	16	33	75	x	x	0.02%	0.03%	0.05%
Other race alone (NH)	17	8	68	128	366	0.05%	0.02%	0.09%	0.12%	0.27%
Mixed race or Multiracial (NH)	x	x	621	1,571	5,091	x	x	0.85%	1.46%	3.72%
Hispanic or Latino (any race)	309	376	1,960	5,549	7,420	0.86%	0.74%	2.68%	5.17%	5.43%
Total	35,777	50,985	73,143	107,431	136,693	100.00%	100.00%	100.00%	100.00%	100.00%

=== 2022 American Community Survey (ACS) ===
There are 60,915 households accounted for in the 2022 ACS, with an average of 2.28 persons per household. The county's a median gross rent is $1,187 in the 2022 ACS. The 2022 ACS reports a median household income of $71,193, with 83.7% of households are owner occupied. 8.5% of the county's population lives at or below the poverty line (down from previous ACS surveys). The city boasts a 48.8% employment rate, with 32.4% of the population holding a bachelor's degree or higher and 93.5% holding a high school diploma.

The top nine reported ancestries (people were allowed to report up to two ancestries, thus the figures will generally add to more than 100%) were English (15.1%), Irish (13.1%), German (11.5%), Italian (5.3%), Polish (2.3%), Scottish (2.3%), French (except Basque) (2.2%), Subsaharan African (0.7%), and Norwegian (0.6%).

The median age in the county was 57.6 years.

Between the period from 2020 to 2023, Brunswick County had the highest estimated growth in population among North Carolina's counties at 15.8 percent. Much of the recent growth has been driven by the in-migration of retirees, and as of 2023 the county has the highest median age in North Carolina.

=== 2010 census ===
As of the 2010 census, there were 107,433 people, 46,298 households, and 32,220 families residing in the county. The population density was 126.8 inhabitants per square mile (49.0/km^{2}). There were 77,482 housing units. The racial makeup of the county was 83.0% White, 11.4% African American, 0.7% Native American, 0.5% Asian, 0.0% Pacific Islander, 2.5% from some other races and 1.8% from two or more races. Hispanic or Latino people of any race were 5.2% of the population.

=== 2000 census ===
As of the 2000 census, there were 73,143 people, 30,438 households, and 22,037 families residing in the county. The population density was 86 inhabitants per square mile (33.2/km^{2}). There were 51,431 housing units at an average density of 60 inhabitants per square mile (23.2/km^{2}). The racial makeup of the county was 82.30% White, 14.38% Black or African American, 0.68% Native American, 0.27% Asian, 0.04% Pacific Islander, 1.32% from other races, and 1.01% from two or more races. Hispanic or Latino people of any race were 2.68% of the population.

There were 30,438 households, out of which 25.70% had children under the age of 18 living with them, 58.10% were married couples living together, 10.20% had a female householder with no husband present, and 27.60% were non-families. 22.90% of all households were made up of individuals, and 8.60% had someone living alone who was 65 years of age or older. The average household size was 2.38 and the average family size was 2.76.

In the county, the population was spread out, with 21.20% under the age of 18, 7.00% from 18 to 24, 25.70% from 25 to 44, 29.20% from 45 to 64, and 16.90% who were 65 years of age or older. The median age was 42 years. For every 100 females there were 96.70 males. For every 100 females age 18 and over, there were 94.90 males.

The median income for a household in the county was $35,888, and the median income for a family was $42,037. Males had a median income of $30,138 versus $22,066 for females. The per capita income for the county was $19,857. About 9.50% of families and 12.60% of the population were below the poverty line, including 19.40% of those under age 18 and 8.10% of those age 65 or over.

== Government and politics ==
Brunswick County is a member of the regional Cape Fear Council of Governments.

The county lies in the inner coastal plain, most of which was highly pro-secession, and part of the Democratic Solid South from the late 19th century through 1964. However, Brunswick County was less fertile than the “Black Belt” and consequently had significant pro-Union and Populist sympathies. The county frequently backed Republicans at state and local levels even when the state was consistently Democratic apart from Herbert Hoover’s 1928 victory. Only three times since the Civil War – Grover Cleveland in 1888, Alton B. Parker in 1904 and Jimmy Carter in 1980 – has Brunswick County backed a losing Democratic presidential candidate. Carter in that 1980 election remains the last Democrat to win a majority of Brunswick County’s ballots, although Bill Clinton won a plurality in 1992. In recent years the county has reliably favored Republican candidates, though in 2024, elections for local office were competitive. In the 2024 North Carolina elections, Brunswick voters favored Republicans for state legislative seats and the county commission, but favored a Democratic gubernatorial candidate for the first time since 2004.

United States presidential election results for Brunswick County, North Carolina
Year	Republican		Democratic		Third party(ies)	
Year	No.	%	No.	%	No.	%
1880	889	53.33%	746	44.75%	32	1.92%
1884	936	50.21%	928	49.79%	0	0.00%
1888	965	48.44%	1,023	51.36%	4	0.20%
1892	446	23.65%	755	40.03%	685	36.32%
1896	878	40.69%	1,279	59.27%	1	0.05%
1900	643	53.85%	525	43.97%	26	2.18%
1904	487	46.34%	564	53.66%	0	0.00%
1908	841	58.08%	607	41.92%	0	0.00%
1912	280	18.51%	777	51.35%	456	30.14%
1916	989	54.94%	810	45.00%	1	0.06%
1920	1,362	52.08%	1,253	47.92%	0	0.00%
1924	1,296	52.79%	1,118	45.54%	41	1.67%
1928	1,931	65.48%	1,018	34.52%	0	0.00%
1932	1,798	44.29%	2,245	55.30%	17	0.42%
1936	1,625	37.49%	2,710	62.51%	0	0.00%
1940	1,522	35.90%	2,717	64.10%	0	0.00%
1944	1,997	45.98%	2,346	54.02%	0	0.00%
1948	1,896	40.49%	2,052	43.82%	735	15.70%
1952	2,958	50.06%	2,951	49.94%	0	0.00%
1956	3,299	50.02%	3,297	49.98%	0	0.00%
1960	2,915	40.37%	4,305	59.63%	0	0.00%
1964	3,721	46.74%	4,240	53.26%	0	0.00%
1968	2,404	27.52%	2,972	34.03%	3,358	38.45%
1972	6,153	69.06%	2,500	28.06%	256	2.87%
1976	3,636	32.86%	7,377	66.66%	53	0.48%
1980	5,897	45.35%	6,761	52.00%	345	2.65%
1984	9,673	58.67%	6,774	41.08%	41	0.25%
1988	10,007	55.78%	7,881	43.93%	51	0.28%
1992	8,833	39.43%	10,177	45.43%	3,390	15.13%
1996	10,065	45.70%	10,041	45.59%	1,917	8.70%
2000	15,427	53.49%	13,118	45.49%	294	1.02%
2004	22,925	60.37%	14,903	39.24%	149	0.39%
2008	30,753	58.46%	21,331	40.55%	524	1.00%
2012	34,743	60.57%	22,038	38.42%	581	1.01%
2016	42,720	62.50%	23,282	34.06%	2,349	3.44%
2020	55,850	61.94%	33,310	36.94%	1,015	1.13%
2024	67,658	61.86%	40,557	37.08%	1,163	1.06%

== Economy ==
Due to its rapidly growing population, the economy in Brunswick County is relatively robust and growing. Jobs in the food service and retail sectors have experienced the greatest expansion in the recent past. Owing to the large presence of retirees, a substantial amount of income in the county is generated through the collection of dividends from investments and various benefits including pensions and Social Security payments. Less than half of county residents participate in the work force. Of those that do, a significant proportion commute outside the county for work.

== Culture ==
The town of Calabash is nationally known for its style of lightly-breaded fried seafood. The town of Navassa is a historically Gullah community, though due to frequent contact with the outside world and involvement in industry the descendants of Gullah people in the area do not speak the Gullah language.

== Communities ==
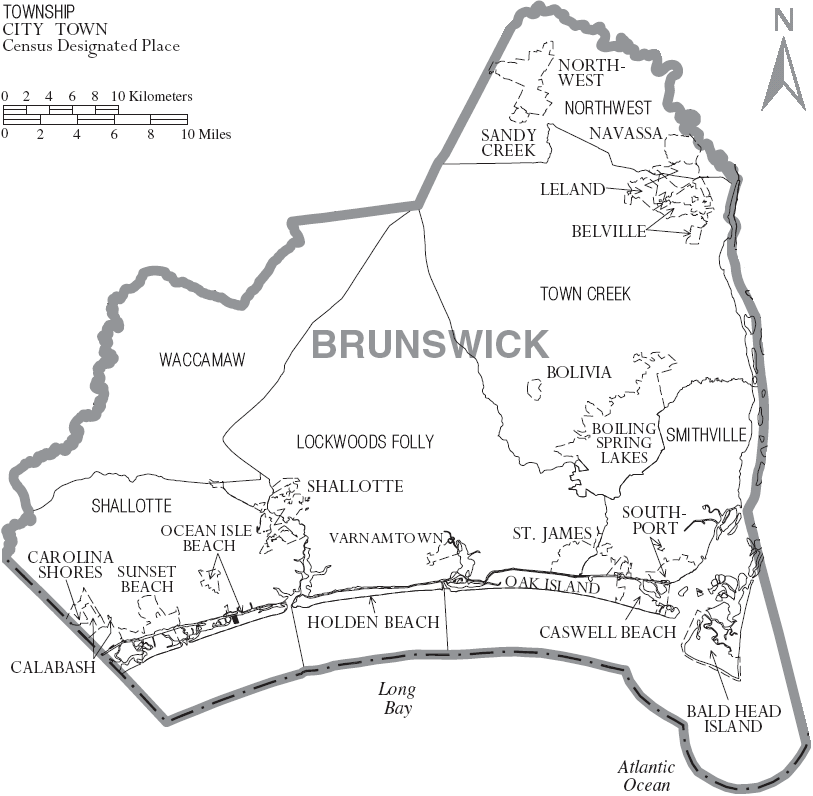
Map of Brunswick County with municipal and township labels

Brunswick County includes to 19 incorporated communities:

=== Cities ===
- Boiling Spring Lakes
- Northwest
- Southport

=== Towns ===
- Belville
- Bolivia (county seat)
- Calabash
- Carolina Shores
- Caswell Beach
- Holden Beach
- Leland (largest community)
- Navassa
- Oak Island
- Ocean Isle Beach
- Sandy Creek
- Shallotte
- St. James
- Sunset Beach
- Varnamtown

=== Village ===
- Bald Head Island

=== Townships ===
- Lockwoods Folly
- Northwest
- Smithville
- Town Creek
- Waccamaw

=== Unincorporated communities ===
- Antioch
- Ash
- Batarora
- Bell Swamp
- Bishop
- Biven
- Bonaparte Landing
- Boone's Neck
- Bowensville
- Brunswick Station
- Camp Branch
- Cedar Grove
- Civietown
- Clairmont
- Coolvale
- Doe Creek
- Eastbrook
- Easy Hill
- Fort Caswell
- Grissettown
- Half Hell
- Longwood
- Maco
- Old Town
- Piney Grove
- Red Bug
- Sunset Harbor
- Supply
- Thomasboro
- Town Creek
- Winnabow

== Education ==
The school district is the Brunswick County Schools school district.

== See also ==
- List of counties in North Carolina
- National Register of Historic Places listings in Brunswick County, North Carolina
- Films and television shows produced in Wilmington, North Carolina
- Colcor, political corruption investigation on government officials in neighboring Columbus County
- GenX, chemical compound found in the Cape Fear River, south of Fayetteville
