= Hurricane Helene (1958) =

Category 4 Atlantic hurricane in 1958

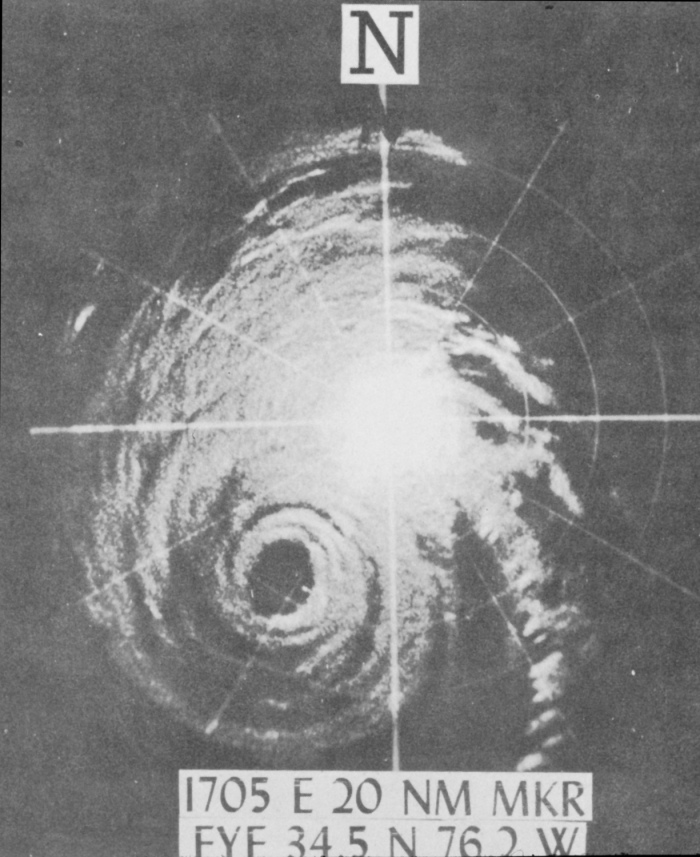
- Radar image of Hurricane Helene on September 26, 1958

Meteorological history
- Formed: September 21, 1958
- Extratropical: September 29, 1958
- Dissipated: October 4, 1958

Category 4 major hurricane
- 1-minute sustained (SSHWS/NWS)
- Highest winds: 150 mph (240 km/h)
- Lowest pressure: 930 mbar (hPa); 27.46 inHg

Overall effects
- Fatalities: 1
- Damage: $11.4 million (1958 USD)
- Areas affected: United States East Coast, Atlantic Canada, British Isles
- IBTrACS
- Part of the 1958 Atlantic hurricane season

Hurricane Helene was the most intense tropical cyclone of the 1958 Atlantic hurricane season. The eighth tropical storm and fourth hurricane of the year, Helene was formed from a tropical wave east of the Lesser Antilles. Moving steadily westward, the storm slowly intensified, attaining hurricane strength on September 26. As conditions became increasingly favorable for tropical cyclone development, Helene began to rapidly intensify. Nearing the United States East Coast, the hurricane quickly attained Category 4 intensity on September 26, before it subsequently reached its peak intensity with maximum sustained winds of 150 mph (240 km/h) and a minimum barometric pressure of 930 mbar (930 hPa; 27 inHg). The intense hurricane came within 10 mi (16 km) of Cape Fear, North Carolina, before recurving out to sea. Accelerating Helene gradually weakened, and transitioned into an extratropical cyclone as it passed over Newfoundland on September 29. Helene's extratropical remnants traversed eastwards across the Atlantic Ocean before dissipating near Great Britain on October 4.

Despite not making landfall in North Carolina, its close proximity to land caused extensive damage across the US East Coast. Strong winds resulted in widespread power outages, cutting telecommunications along the coast. A weather station in Wilmington, North Carolina reported a wind gust of 135 mph (217 km/h), setting a new record for the fastest wind gust reported there. Though mostly concentrated in North Carolina, rainfall was widespread, reaching as far north as Maine. In the United States, damages reached $11.2 million and there was one indirect death. After impacting the US, Helene produced strong winds and heavy rain across much of Atlantic Canada. In Cape Breton Island on Nova Scotia, the storm was considered the worst in at least 21 years. Power outages cut most communications from the island to the mainland, and property damage in Sydney, Nova Scotia totaled to C$100,000. At Helene's landfall in Newfoundland, strong gusts peaking at 82 mph (132 km/h) in Naval Station Argentia were reported, and loss of power severed communications. Damage across there totaled to at least C$100,000. Total damages associated with Helene in the United States and Canada amounted to $11.4 million, making Helene the costliest storm of the season.

== Meteorological history ==
Map plotting the storm's track and intensity, according to the Saffir–Simpson scale Map key Saffir–Simpson scale Tropical depression (≤38 mph, ≤62 km/h) Tropical storm (39–73 mph, 63–118 km/h) Category 1 (74–95 mph, 119–153 km/h) Category 2 (96–110 mph, 154–177 km/h) Category 3 (111–129 mph, 178–208 km/h) Category 4 (130–156 mph, 209–251 km/h) Category 5 (≥157 mph, ≥252 km/h) Unknown Storm type Tropical cyclone Subtropical cyclone Extratropical cyclone, remnant low, tropical disturbance, or monsoon depression

The origins of Hurricane Helene can be traced back to an easterly wave that formed near Cape Verde on September 16. Moving towards the west due to trade winds associated with the Hadley cell, the disturbance gradually intensified. On September 20, ships in the system's vicinity reported widespread shower activity and generally low barometric pressures. Early the following day, a reconnaissance flight reported evidence of a weak circulation, with gusts of 35 mph (56 km/h) in heavy squalls surrounding the circulation center. At 0200 UTC later that day, the United States Weather Bureau office in San Juan, Puerto Rico began issuing bulletins on the system for public interests. In HURDAT, the tropical wave was first classified as a tropical depression at 0600 UTC on September 21, well east of the Leeward Antilles. At the time, the depression had maximum sustained winds of 30 mph (48 km/h).

Moving on a west-northwest track at roughly 20 mph (32 km/h) early on September 22, the storm initially changed little in intensity. However, a large upper tropospheric anticyclone developed over the southern Atlantic coast, producing the favorable wind shear needed for tropical cyclone development. A second reconnaissance flight reported an intensified tropical cyclone, indicating that the storm system had reached tropical storm strength. At 0000 UTC on September 23, the depression attained tropical storm strength, with maximum winds of 40 mph (64 km/h) and a central minimum pressure of 1,013 mbar (1,013 hPa; 29.9 inHg). The US Weather Bureau issued their first advisory on the newly developed tropical storm at 1600 UTC later that day, giving the storm the name Helene. Despite the storm's poor organization, Helene gradually intensified in favorable conditions generated by the large anticyclone. Throughout the day, a second anticyclone moved eastward until it was situated off of the Mid-Atlantic states, while a mean trough in the lower levels of the atmosphere became situated over the United States East Coast. This would set up a path for Helene to pass very close to the United States. The tropical storm attained hurricane intensity by 2200 UTC on 2200 UTC on September 24, while located 425 mi (684 km) east of Fort Pierce, Florida. However, in post-season analysis, it was found that Helene reached hurricane intensity earlier that day, by 1200 UTC. At the time, gale-force winds extended up to 220 mi (350 km) out from the storm's center of circulation.

The hurricane steadily strengthened as it moved towards the northwest around the western periphery of the Azores High on September 25. Encountering the anticyclone situated off of the Mid-Atlantic states, Helene began to curve slightly towards the west. The lack of strong steering currents in the storm's vicinity caused the hurricane to move very slowly throughout the day, giving the hurricane time to significantly intensify. By 0000 UTC on September 26, Helene strengthened to the equivalent of a modern-day Category 2 hurricane, with a minimum pressure of 980 mbar (980 hPa; 29 inHg). Moving slowly towards The Carolinas, the hurricane rapidly intensified. A recon flight reported a minimum pressure of 948 mbar (948 hPa; 28.0 inHg), a drop of 40 mbar (40 hPa; 1.2 inHg) from the previous day. As the hurricane neared the coast, its eye became apparent on coastal long-range WSR-57 weather radar images. By 1800 UTC on September 26, Helene strengthened to a Category 3 hurricane and then to a Category 4 hurricane the following day. The major hurricane continued to strengthen before reaching its peak intensity on September 27 with winds of 150 mph (240 km/h). However, Helene's lowest barometric pressure of 930 mbar (930 hPa; 27 inHg) was recorded earlier during the day. Still moving northwestward due to the influence of the Azores High, the hurricane came within 10 mi (16 km) of the US East Coast before recurving towards the northeast out to sea.

As Helene recurved and accelerated towards more northerly latitudes, it steadily weakened. By 1200 UTC on September 28, Helene was no longer a major hurricane. The hurricane's wind field also expanded from the storm's center as it weakened. By midday on September 29, Helene had weakened to minimal hurricane strength, and later transitioned into an extratropical cyclone by 1800 UTC that day, though it still maintained hurricane-force winds. At roughly the same time, Helene passed over Newfoundland, with gale-force winds having expanded 500 mi (800 km) from the system's center, coinciding with the US Weather Bureau's final advisory on the system. Helene's extratropical remnants continued eastward across the Atlantic, becoming a dominant synoptic feature, before entirely dissipating by 0600 UTC on October 4 just west of Great Britain.

== Preparations ==
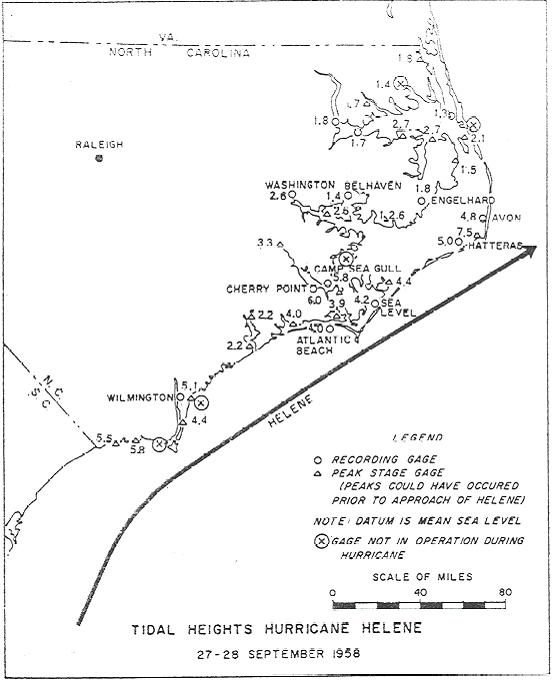
Path of Helene near the Carolinas

Upon the storm's formation, the Weather Bureau cautioned ships in Helene's path of the impending conditions, and did so throughout the storm's duration. As the storm moved west on September 23, advisories specified for small craft in northern islands of The Bahamas to remain in "protected places." After Helene was forecast to remain north of the archipelago, notifications were lifted except for small craft along the coast of the South Atlantic States. Nearing the US East Coast, the Weather Bureau began to issue special bulletins for press radio and television stations early on September 24. At the same time, small craft were warned of the storm from The Carolinas southward. The following day, the weather forecast office (WFO) in Charleston, South Carolina began to issue local statements regarding the hurricane, while small craft alerts were shifted northward to coastal regions between Cape Hatteras, North Carolina and Daytona Beach, Florida. The first hurricane watch was issued on 1000 UTC on September 26 for the entirety of the Georgian coast to Charleston, South Carolina. A gale warning was posted at the same time for coastal areas from Daytona Beach, Florida to Wilmington, North Carolina. Small craft alerts continued to shift northwards along with Helene.

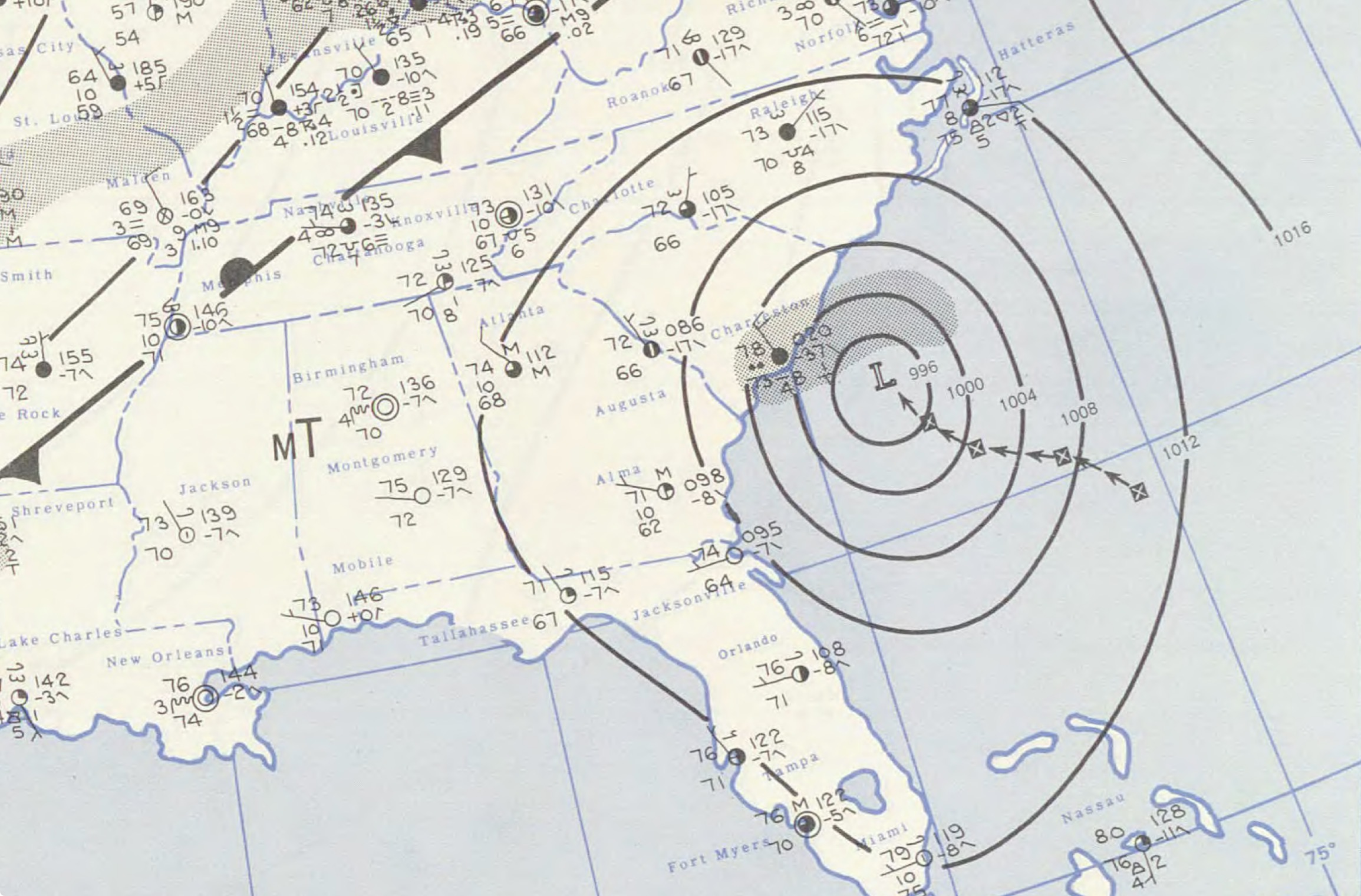
Surface weather analysis showing Hurricane Helene approaching North Carolina on September 27

As the storm began to quickly intensify on September 27, areas of the watch from Savannah, Georgia to Cape Fear, North Carolina were upgraded to a hurricane emergency area at 1600 UTC. Affected communities were advised to begin precautionary measures immediately and evacuate. Shipping and small craft were told to exercise "extreme caution." Gale warnings were changed to warn areas between Fernandina, Florida to Cape Hatteras, North Carolina. The heightened warnings caused WFOs to issue local bulletins regarding the impending hurricane. At the time, the Weather Bureau projected Helene to make landfall in South Carolina. These landfall forecasts shifted further north along the coast over time, before they were stopped after Helene recurved away from the coast entirely. At 0400 UTC on September 27, hurricane warnings were extended to include areas between Cape Fear and Cape Hatteras, North Carolina. Gale warning issuance reflected the changes and were too shifted northwards to the Virginia Capes area, while hurricane watches covered both warning areas. At 1600 UTC later that day, hurricane emergency and gale warnings were extended north to Manteo, North Carolina, while hurricane watches were continued for coastal regions from Savannah, Georgia to Myrtle Beach, South Carolina. After Helene began recurving away from the coast, all warnings south of Wilmington, North Carolina were discontinued at 2200 UTC on September 27. As Helene passed certain areas, warnings were discontinued upon the storm's passage. At 1000 UTC the next day, all onshore hurricane warnings were either downgraded to gale warnings or discontinued. However, offshore gale warnings were still issued for oceanic regions from the Virginia Capes to Cape Cod, Massachusetts. Shortly after, all warnings, with the exception of the offshore gale warnings, were discontinued. Remaining warnings lasted until 2200 UTC on September 28. Despite not issuing any warnings, the Weather Bureau cautioned interests in Newfoundland, and forecasted hurricane-force winds to effect the island.

Due to the potential impacts from Helene, the Weather Bureau began to advise prompt emergency evacuation in their advisories. Areas between Beaufort, South Carolina and Cape Fear, North Carolina were urged to begin evacuation procedures immediately. The Southeastern American Red Cross sent ten field staff warnings to locations in Georgia and South Carolina in order to assist in setting up emergency shelters. The Red Cross held 27 hurricane preparation conferences to plan preparation procedures. Other civil defense organizations also mobilized hurricane preparation staff and equipment. The Weather Bureau sent a mobile weather station to Charleston, South Carolina in order to monitor weather conditions and alert surrounding populations with short-range radio equipment. Beaches on North Carolina's coast, including Wrightsville Beach and Carolina Beach, were completely evacuated during the night of September 27. In Wilmington, North Carolina, 100 members of the United States National Guard were dispatched to monitor waterfront property, while 60 others were kept on standby. Civilian vehicles attempting to enter Myrtle Beach, South Carolina were sent back by highway patrol 15 mi (24 km) outside the city borders, following an order issued by Governor of South Carolina George Bell Timmerman, Jr. The order was issued to minimize casualties and prevent looting. Approximately 100 members of the National Guard and local police were kept to patrol the beach. Despite repeated orders for mandatory evacuation, a few people remained in Myrtle Beach. Civil Defense authorities forcibly evacuated stragglers, but others were permitted to remain.

== Impact ==
=== United States East Coast ===
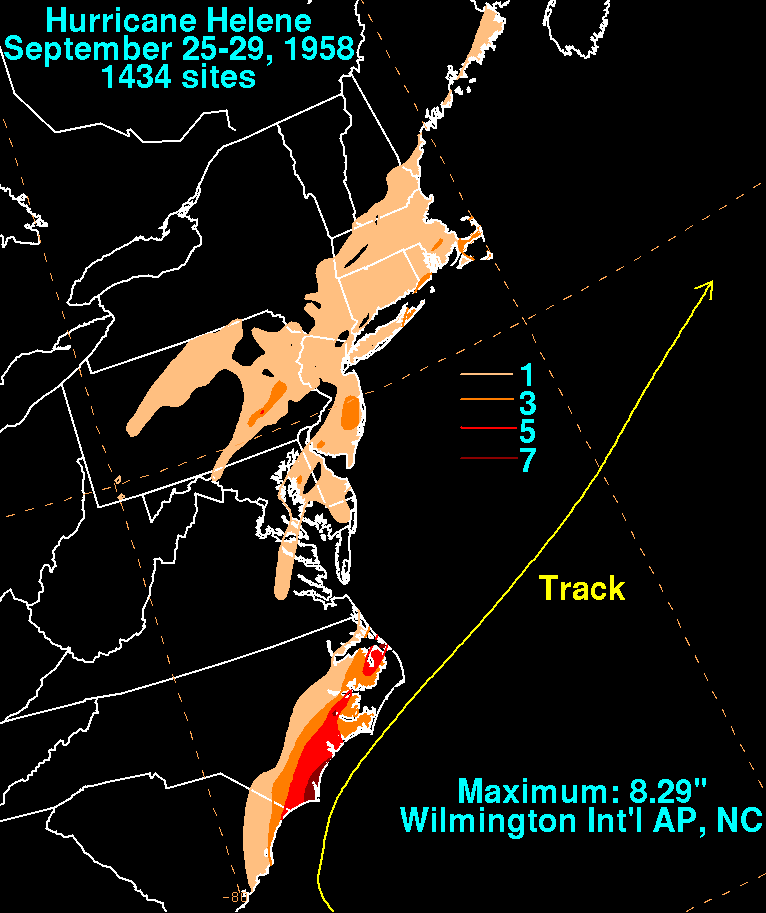
Rainfall totals in the United States

Despite not making landfall, Helene's close proximity to the United States resulted in impacts along the East Coast. Impacts were most severe in North Carolina, where the hurricane made its closest approach. Wind impacts were felt primarily from South Carolina to Virginia, though a frontal zone aided in bringing precipitation as far north as Maine. In the United States, Helene caused $11.2 million in damages and one indirect fatality.

==== North Carolina ====
Roughly paralleling the North Carolina coast beginning on September 26, Helene's slow movement and strong intensity resulted in moderate to heavy impacts in coastal areas of the state. Despite the hurricane's Category 4 hurricane intensity, due to its closest approach to land remaining offshore, its storm surge remained less than initially forecast. The hurricane's track also placed its strongest storm surge in the eastern hemisphere of the storm, away from any landmasses. Surge heights peaked at 6 ft (1.8 m) near Marine Corps Air Station Cherry Point. In Wilmington, Helene produced ocean swells at the coast 2.5 – 3 times per minute, indicative of a strong hurricane. There, the cumulative sea level was roughly 9 ft (2.7 m) above normal. However, as a result of the storm striking at low tide, damage caused by storm surge was mostly mitigated. Despite this, sand dunes in southern areas of Fort Fisher, were mostly destroyed by waves. On Cedar Island, strong winds produced by the hurricane pushed waves inland, inundating homes. Elsewhere, minor beach erosion occurred.

Further inland, several weather stations reported hurricane-force winds. The Weather Bureau office in Wilmington, North Carolina, reported maximum sustained winds of 88 mph (142 km/h) and a peak gust of 135 mph (217 km/h), exceeding the previous record for fastest measured wind speed of 98 mph (158 km/h) set during Hurricane Hazel in 1954. Beach resorts there were heavily damaged. In Wrightsville Beach, located 10 mi (16 km) of Wilmington, 12 houses were flattened by the hurricane. Damage to homes there were estimated by police to cost $300,000, and extensive damage to the water system was reported. In Long Beach, damage was less severe, with only minor property damage. Waves pushing past sand dunes caused cracks in seaside roads. Though surveys made no damage estimates, damage in Holden Beach was reported to have been worse than in Long Beach. A 300 ft (91 m) pier and a pavilion in Ocean Isle Beach were destroyed. In Topsail Beach and Kure Beach, several homes and businesses were either unroofed or destroyed. Yaupon Beach and Shallotte also had similar reports of unroofed homes. Two homes on Topsail Island were demolished, and extensive property damage was reported in Atlantic Beach. At Cape Fear, winds were estimated at 125 mph (201 km/h), with gusts as high as 160 mph (260 km/h), well into Category 3 intensity. The powerful winds forced power to be cut off in Wilmington as a precautionary measure. As a result, 7,000 telephones were knocked out of service. Damage to the Southern Bell Telephone Company's offices cost $150,000. Total damages in the city was estimated to cost nearly $2 million. In Morehead City, a roof was blown from a yacht shed and multiple structures. Long-distance telephone services were also cut off. Off the coast on Ocracoke Island, power and communications failed during the storm after the island was battered by winds of 60 mph (97 km/h). Power outages were commonplace in other areas as well. In Southport, metal debris was scattered across city streets, and the damage there was described as worse than Hurricane Hazel. Half of its pier was swept away by the rough seas, and other buildings collapsed or sustained heavy damage. Numerous trees, including live oak, were uprooted by the winds. The United States Army provided the port with a temporary electrical generator, which provided power for water pumps and light. In Cape Hatteras, Helene caused an estimated $1 million in damages. Although damage to infrastructure tapered off 10 mi (16 km) from the coast, crop damage was observed 40 mi (64 km) inland. Corn was the crop most affected by Helene.

Rainfall associated with Helene was primarily concentrated in coastal regions North Carolina, peaking at 8.29 in (211 mm) in Wilmington International Airport. In Hatteras, 4.85 in (123 mm) of rain was measured. Rainfall totals of at least 3 in (76 mm) were commonplace elsewhere along the North Carolina coast. An indirect death occurred when a car skidded off a flooded highway, killing the driver. In the state, damages from Helene amounted to $11 million.

==== South Carolina ====
Effects from Helene in South Carolina were less severe than in North Carolina. Helene made its closest approach to the state on September 27, 85 mi (137 km). In Charleston, sustained winds reached 63 mph (101 km/h) and there was minor damage reported Trees and street signs were blown down, and beach houses suffered shingle damage. Sporadic and small power outages occurred throughout the city. Damage became progressively worse from Georgetown to Little River, with automobile accidents, torn roofs, and damaged piers. On Harbor Island, 50 percent of structure were reported to have roof damage, causing and estimated $125,000 in damages. Elsewhere along the South Carolina coast, beach erosion occurred due to the strong waves, and sections of pier were swept into sea. In Windy Hill and Cherry Grove Beach, three fishing piers were damaged. Damage was minor in Myrtle Beach, and was limited to roof and window damage. Further inland, in Columbia, damage was minimal, with no rainfall reported. Light damage to crops was reported inland, particularly in Marion County. Across the state, damages were estimated at $200,000 from the hurricane, though this did not include beach erosion or damage to sand dunes.

==== Elsewhere in the United States ====
As a result of Helene recurving away from the United States East Coast, damage in the United States outside of the Carolinas was less severe. In Virginia, damage was relatively minor. A peak gust of 56 mph (90 km/h) was reported in Norfolk. In Hampton Roads, damage was minor, and was confined to downed utility wires and marginal infrastructural damage. Although rainfall was primarily concentrated in the Carolinas, 1,434 official rain gauges measured precipitation in coastal areas from South Carolina to Maine. Precipitation was further increased by a frontal zone to the hurricane's north. In the Mid-Atlantic States, rainfall peaked at 5.29 in (134 mm) in Myerstown, Pennsylvania. Outside of Pennsylvania or the Carolinas, no weather station reported rainfall exceeding 5 in (130 mm). In the New England region, rainfall peaked at 4.11 in (104 mm) in Hyannis, Massachusetts. Elsewhere in Massachusetts, rainfall totals ranging from 1–4 in (25–102 mm) caused minor flooding and road washouts. The minor floods led to several automotive accidents. Other states in New England reported rainfall peaks of at least 1 in (25 mm), with the lowest peak occurring at a weather station in Machias, Maine, which reported 1.16 in (29 mm) of rainfall.

=== Atlantic Canada ===
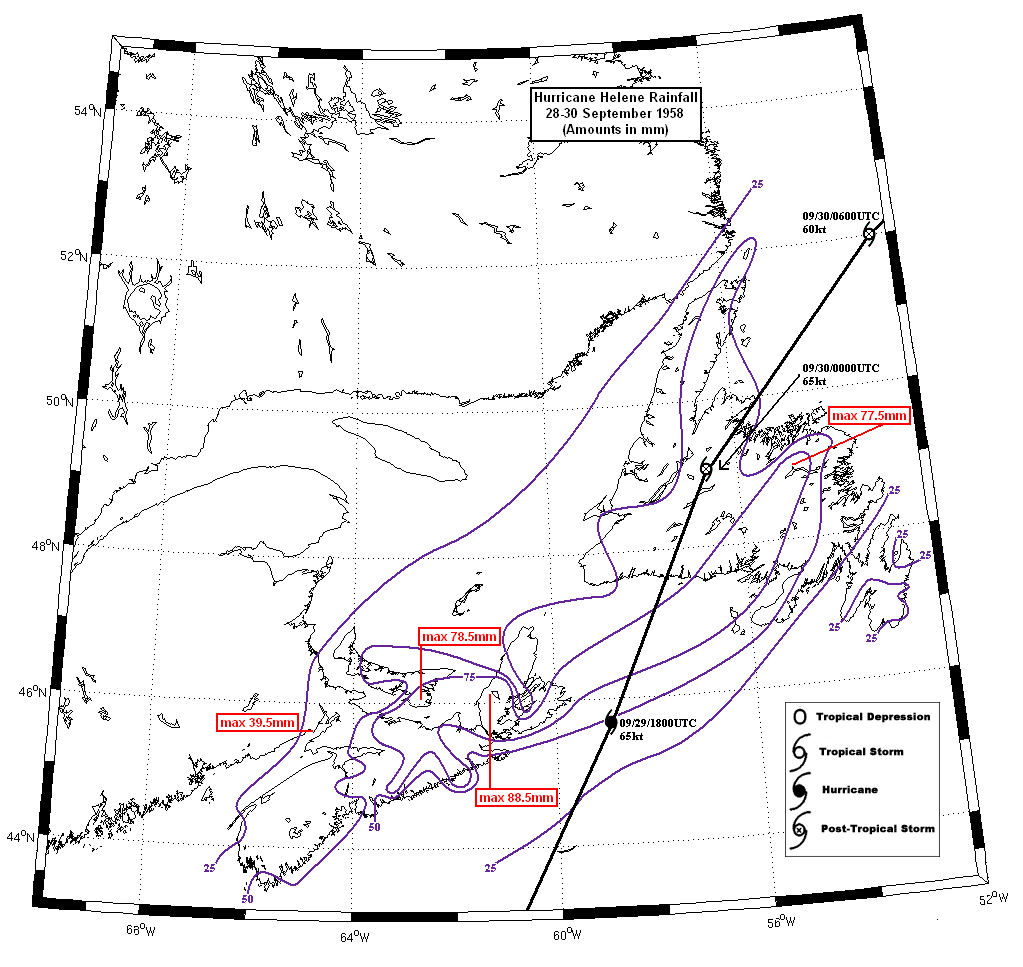
Map of rainfall in Atlantic Canada

As Helene approached Atlantic Canada in the process of transitioning into an extratropical storm, it produced heavy rainfall and strong winds along the region. Passing just east of Nova Scotia on September 29, Helene dropped at least 1 in (25 mm) across the entire province, peaking at 3.48 in (88 mm) in Cape Breton Island. Gusts peaked at 50 mph (80 km/h) across Cabot Strait, 70 mph (110 km/h) at CFB Shearwater and 60 mph (97 km/h) at Summerside, Prince Edward Island. The storm damaged power lines on the island but they were quickly repaired. The strong winds uprooted trees in the Halifax and Dartmouth, Nova Scotia area. In Nova Scotia, Helene's worst effects were felt in Cape Breton Island, where the storm was considered the worst in at least 21 years. Only one communication line from the island to the mainland was effective after the storm passed. Numerous downed power lines resulted in minor fires, and schools were closed throughout the island. In Sydney, Nova Scotia, there was considerable property damage, and as many as 700 people lost power. The lack of sufficient electricity forced the suspension of publications of the Cape Breton Post and disrupted normal restaurant cooking procedures. Damages in the community amounted to C$100,000. Offshore, the Royal Canadian Mounted Police cutter Fort Walsh, measuring 115 ft (35 m) in length, was washed ashore on the coast of Scatarie Island. The fishing wharf in Caribou, Nova Scotia was destroyed by rough seas generated by Helene, and at least 1,000 lobster traps were carried into the Northumberland Strait as a result. In New Brunswick, the hurricane's impacts were relatively minor, and rainfall peaked at 1.56 in (40 mm).

Quickly accelerating northwards, Helene made landfall on Newfoundland late on September 29. Rainfall peaked at 3.05 in (77 mm) in northern parts of the island, while rainfall amounts were generally minimal across the Avalon Peninsula. A weather station in Naval Station Argentia reported maximum sustained winds of 60 mph (97 km/h) and a gust of 82 mph (132 km/h). The winds severed communications in southwestern Newfoundland and cut communications in St. John's, Newfoundland and Labrador from the mainland. Bell Island was cut off from the rest of Newfoundland due to rough seas generated by Helene, which resulted in the destruction of piers and lack of boat service. Damage caused by the hurricane on the island were estimated to be in excess of C$100,000.

== Aftermath ==
Following the storm, Governor of North Carolina Luther H. Hodges and United States Senator from North Carolina B. Everett Jordan requested a disaster declaration for the state. President of the United States Dwight D. Eisenhower designated portions of North Carolina impacted by the storm as a disaster area. According to the American Red Cross, at least 5,000 people were kept in shelters after Helene. Following the large-scale evacuation procedures and resulting low loss of life after the storm, the Weather Bureau recommended that certain organizations be awarded the Outstanding Service to the Public certificate due to their cooperation with the Weather Bureau during the hurricane's duration. The recommended recipients were the radio stations WPTF and WRAL, and the North Carolina State Highway Patrol.

== See also ==
- Hurricane Able (1950)
- Hurricane Diana (1984)
- Hurricane Florence (2018)
- Other storms of the same name
- List of North Carolina hurricanes
- List of Category 4 Atlantic hurricanes
