= List of storms named Diana =

The name Diana has been used for two tropical cyclones in the Atlantic Ocean, four in the Eastern Pacific Ocean, and one in the South Pacific Ocean. Additionally, the name Diana has been used for two European windstorms.

In the Atlantic:

- Hurricane Diana (1984) – Category 4 hurricane, struck North Carolina
- Hurricane Diana (1990) – Category 2 hurricane, struck Yucatán and Veracruz, Mexico

Diana was retired from usage in the Atlantic after the 1990 season and was replaced with Dolly for the 1996 season.

In the East Pacific:

- Hurricane Diana (1960) – Category 1 hurricane, brushed southern Baja California Peninsula
- Tropical Storm Diana (1968) – remained over the open ocean
- Hurricane Diana (1972) – Category 2 hurricane, dissipated near the Hawaiian Islands
- Hurricane Diana (1976) – Category 2 hurricane, never threatened land

In the South Pacific:

- Cyclone Diana (1978)

In Europe:

- Storm Diana (2018) – affected Portugal
- Storm Diana (2022) – affected Italy

== See also ==
- Cyclone Dana (2024) – a North Indian Ocean tropical cyclone with a similar name
