= Hurricane Diana (1984) =

Category 4 Atlantic hurricane in 1984

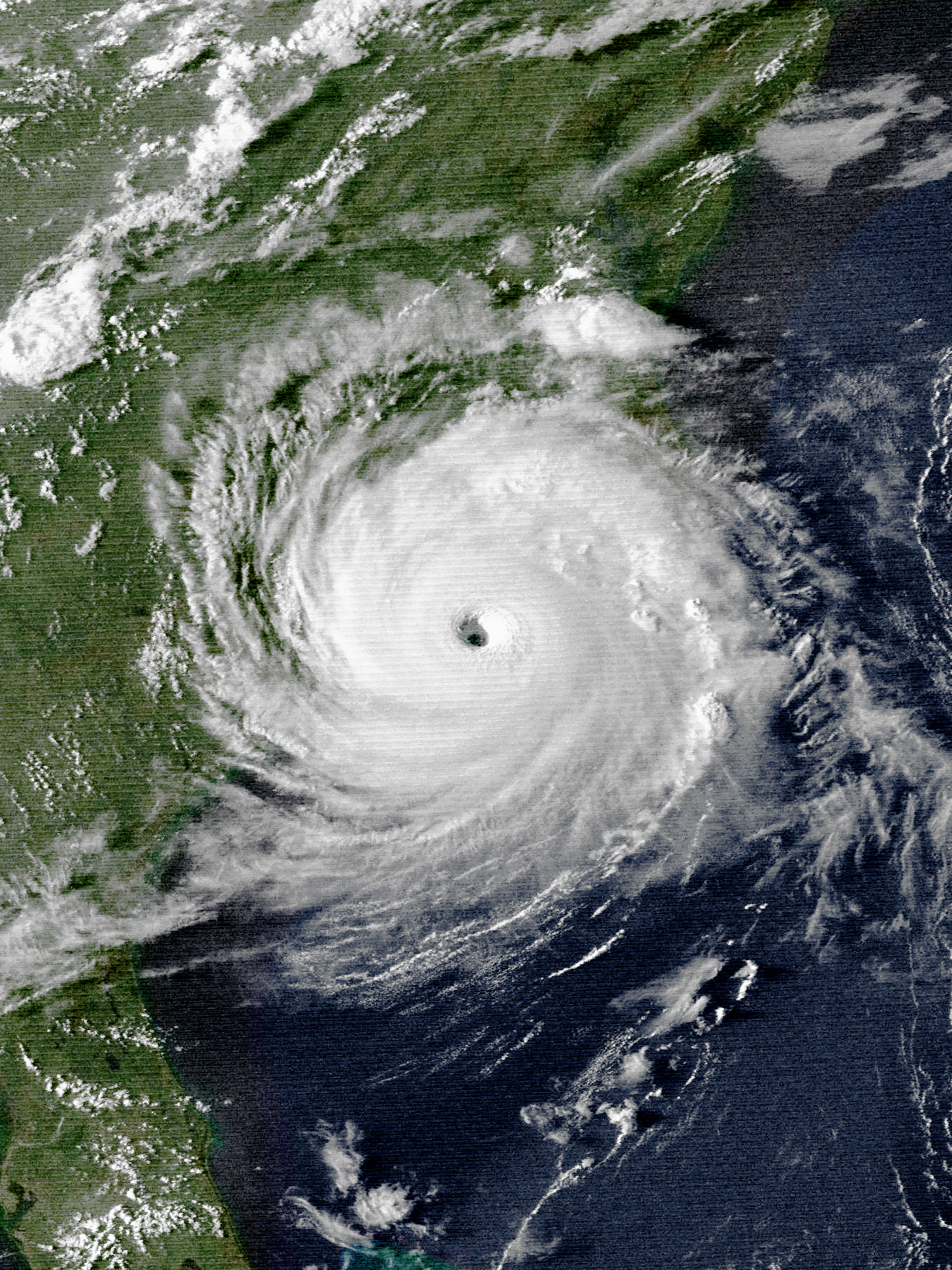
- Diana near peak intensity off the coast of North Carolina on September 11

Meteorological history
- Formed: September 8, 1984
- Dissipated: September 16, 1984

Category 4 major hurricane
- 1-minute sustained (SSHWS/NWS)
- Highest winds: 130 mph (215 km/h)
- Lowest pressure: 949 mbar (hPa); 28.02 inHg

Overall effects
- Fatalities: 3 indirect
- Damage: $65.5 million (1984 USD)
- Areas affected: The Bahamas, Florida, The Carolinas, Virginia, Northeastern United States, Eastern Canada
- IBTrACS
- Part of the 1984 Atlantic hurricane season

Hurricane Diana was the first tropical cyclone to produce hurricane-force winds at a nuclear power plant. The ninth tropical cyclone, fourth named storm, first hurricane, and first major hurricane of the 1984 Atlantic hurricane season, Diana developed just north of the Bahamas on September 8 from an extratropical cyclone. After initially moving westward towards east-central Florida, the storm turned northward and paralleled the coastline. Diana intensified into a hurricane on September 11 and continued to strengthen, peaking as a Category 4 hurricane on the Saffir–Simpson scale with maximum sustained winds of 130 mph (215 km/h) on the following day. After drifting offshore the Carolinas, Diana weakened and then made landfall near Cape Fear, North Carolina, as a Category 2 hurricane on September 13. The cyclone quickly weakened to a tropical storm and curved back out to sea, heading northeast until it became extratropical near Newfoundland on September 16.

Watches and warnings were issued for the storm along the East Coast of the United States between eastern Florida and Virginia. Diana brought abnormally high tides, strong winds, and heavy rains to parts of the Carolinas. Significant beach erosion impacted Horry County, South Carolina, and several counties in North Carolina. A few counties in the latter – Duplin, Pender, and Sampson – experienced 100-year flood events. The Brunswick Nuclear Generating Station reported hurricane-force winds, but no damage to the plant itself. Diana demolished 68 homes and extensively damaged 325 others in North Carolina. Throughout the United States, damages totaled at least $65.5 million (1984 USD) and five people died, all due to indirect causes. Damage to agriculture represented about $26.5 million of that figure. Another death occurred in Atlantic Canada after waves swept two people off a ship offshore Nova Scotia.

== Meteorological history ==
Map plotting the storm's track and intensity, according to the Saffir–Simpson scale Map key Saffir–Simpson scale Tropical depression (≤38 mph, ≤62 km/h) Tropical storm (39–73 mph, 63–118 km/h) Category 1 (74–95 mph, 119–153 km/h) Category 2 (96–110 mph, 154–177 km/h) Category 3 (111–129 mph, 178–208 km/h) Category 4 (130–156 mph, 209–251 km/h) Category 5 (≥157 mph, ≥252 km/h) Unknown Storm type Tropical cyclone Subtropical cyclone Extratropical cyclone, remnant low, tropical disturbance, or monsoon depression

The origins of Hurricane Diana can be traced back to a stalled out area of low pressure just north of the Bahamas along the tail end of a cold front on September 6. Shower and thunderstorm activity began to increase the next day but was generally disorganized. Around 1200 UTC on September 8, a ship in the vicinity of the low reported a sustained wind speed of 40 mph (65 km/h). A few hours later, based on satellite observations, the low was designated Tropical Storm Diana. With weak steering currents, Diana gradually intensified as it slowly moved towards the west over the next day, coming within 50 miles (85 km) of Cape Canaveral, Florida, before taking a sharp turn towards the north-northwest. As Diana neared Saint Augustine, Florida, it turned towards the northeast and intensified into a hurricane.

Under weak steering currents while detached to the front, Diana drifted westward, and came within 50 miles (85 km) of the Florida coast. Rather than continuing westward, where it would have hit near Cape Canaveral, Diana turned to the northwest where it paralleled the coastline. The storm, continually strengthening over the Gulf Stream, turned to the northeast and became a hurricane on September 10. On September 11 and September 12, Diana rapidly intensified to a peak of 130 mph (215 km/h) winds while remaining offshore.

An approaching frontal system caused Diana to execute a cyclonic loop, where cool, dry air caused it to weaken. The hurricane hit Wilmington, North Carolina as a weakening hurricane with maximum sustained winds of 100 mph (150 km/h) on September 13, and quickly weakened to a tropical storm over land. The high pressure system that built in after Diana looped weakened, allowing the storm to move to the north and east. After crossing the Outer Banks, Diana accelerated to the northeast, and after restrengthening to a 70 miles per hour (110 km/h) storm, became extratropical near Nova Scotia on September 16.

== Preparations ==
Hurricane Diana just before landfall on September 13

Soon after advisories were initiated, gale warnings were issued between Cape Canaveral, Florida and Virginia Beach, Virginia during the afternoon of September 8. During the morning of September 9, gale warnings were lowered south of St. Augustine, Florida. As Diana strengthened into a hurricane, hurricane watches and gale warnings were raised between St. Augustine and Oregon Inlet, North Carolina. By the morning of September 10, gale warnings were upgraded to hurricane warnings between Brunswick, Georgia and Oregon Inlet. All warnings and watches south of Brunswick were dropped at that time. By the morning of September 11, hurricane warnings were lowered south of Savannah, Georgia. That afternoon, all warnings were lowered south of Cape Romain, South Carolina.

On the morning of September 12, all warnings were lowered south of Myrtle Beach, South Carolina. Early in the morning of September 13, gale warnings were raised between Cape Romain and Myrtle Beach. Later that morning, hurricane warnings were lowered between Wilmington, North Carolina and Oregon Inlet, and all warnings were dropped between Cape Lookout and Virginia Beach. Gale warnings were then in effect between Wilmington and Cape Lookout. Once inland, all warnings were lowered on the afternoon of September 13. As the tropical storm moved offshore, gale warnings went into effect between the mornings of September 14 and September 15 between Cape Lookout and Chincoteague, Virginia.

Along the North Carolina coastline, state troopers were deployed to assist residents in evacuating and preparing for the hurricane. South Carolina governor Mike Daniel declared a state of emergency and placed the national guard on standby. Schools throughout the Carolinas and Georgia were closed. Most beaches were closed due to strong rip currents and beach erosion. Residents on barrier islands were urged to evacuate as waves in excess of 12 ft (3.7 m) were expected to inundate them. Approximately 94 families were relocated from their mobile homes near Beaufort, North Carolina by state officials. A 24-hour emergency operations center was also established. The Coast Guard moved all available boats in the area to a position where they could be deployed immediately if needed.

Along the Georgia coastline, The Golden Isles of Georgia were evacuated due to large swells produced by Diana. Two nursing homes in Tybee Island were evacuated and a voluntary evacuation was issued for all residents in the town. Several shelters were also opened at schools in a few counties; however, relatively few families sought refuge in them. Local schools and beaches were also closed for the duration of the storm's passage.

== Impact and aftermath ==
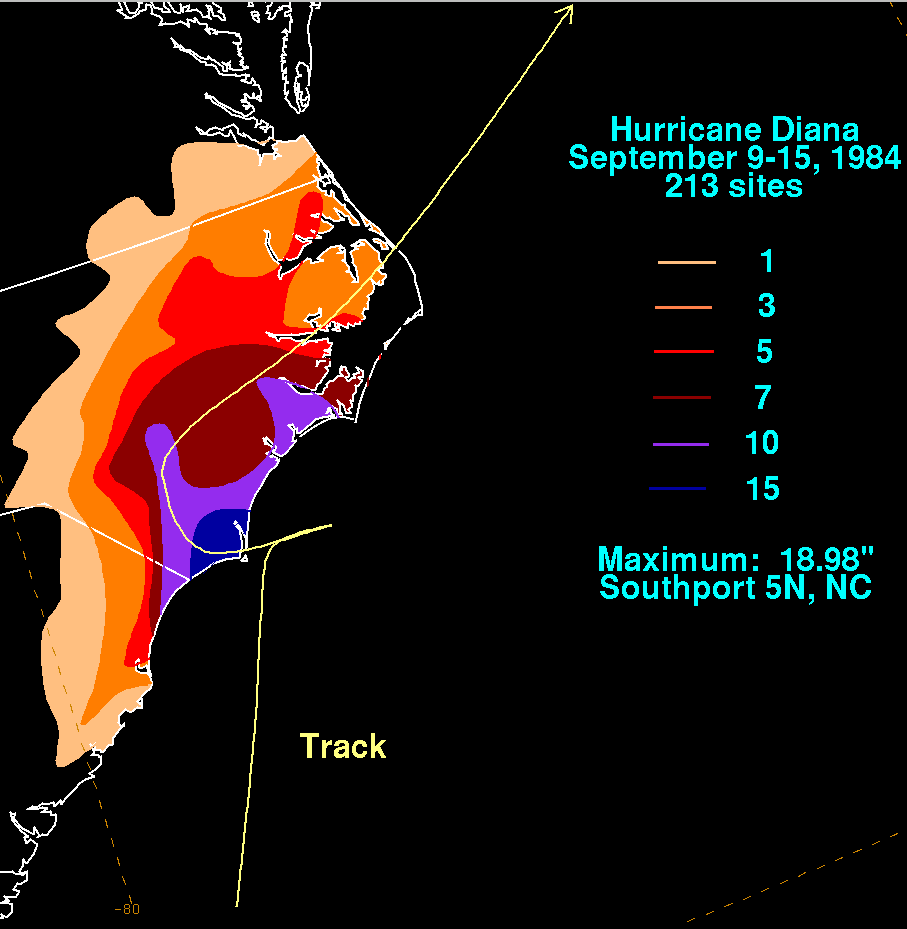
Rainfall totals

In South Carolina, Diana caused severe erosion in Horry County. Within the Grand Strand area, 90 homes, 40 multi-family units, 8 mobile homes, and a few businesses were damaged. Heavy rains also fell over the northeastern parts of the county. Sustained winds in the state peaked at 45 mph (72 km/h) in North Myrtle Beach, while Charleston Harbor recorded tides of 6.8 ft (2.1 m) mean low water, equivalent to about 1.1 ft (0.34 m) above-average high tide.

With Category 4 winds of 130 mph (210 km/h), Diana threatened to become the most intense hurricane to strike North Carolina since Hurricane Hazel in 1954. However, it looped and weakened just offshore and made landfall as a Category 2 hurricane. Because of this, Diana only caused $65.5 million in damage (1984 USD) due to heavy flooding from up to almost 20 in (510 mm) of rain, tree damage, and downed power lines. Storm Data estimated that slightly more damage occurred, reaching $78 million in southeastern North Carolina alone, with agriculture accounting for approximately $26.5 million of this total. Portions of Duplin, Pender, and Sampson counties experienced 100-year flood events as a result of the heavy precipitation. Diana demolished 68 homes and extensively damaged 325 others in North Carolina. Three people died in North Carolina, all due to indirect causes, one from a heart attack while making hurricane preparations and the other two were from automobile accidents.

In Brunswick County, the Coast Guard station in Caswell Beach observed sustained winds of 104 mph (167 km/h) and gusts up to 115 mph (185 km/h). Homes in Caswell Beach, Long Beach, Holden Beach, Southport, and Yaupon Beach suffered a complete failure of their roofs, while some residences in Long Beach were destroyed. The Carolina Power and Light Brunswick Nuclear Power Plant in Southport recorded winds of over 75 mph (121 km/h), making Diana the first cyclone to bring hurricane-force winds to a nuclear power plant. The storm severely damaged a mobile home and demolished a fabrication shed, but the plant itself was not damaged. Heavy precipitation washed out a number of roads and caused a dam failure. Saturated ground and winds combined to topple many trees.

Strong winds in New Hanover County deroofed a hotel and substantially damaged several structures that were under construction. Freshwater flooding occurred in parts of Carolina Beach, while Wrightsville Beach lost approximately 10 to 20 ft (3.0 to 6.1 m) of berm due to erosion. Severe erosion also occurred in parts of Pender County, especially in Topsail Beach. Twenty-seven families evacuated near the Holly Shelter Swamp after the Northeast Cape Fear River began flooding the area. Damage in the county reached about $8.86 million, with $5 million to property, $3.8 million to crops, and $60,000 to power lines. Neighboring Bladen and Columbus counties reported approximately $4.194 million and $6.02 million in damage, respectively. In the former, $4.1 million of this total was incurred to agriculture and the other $94,000 to property, while Columbus County experienced $5 million in damage to agriculture and $520,000 to property. In Onslow County, rough seas damaged fishing piers near Camp Lejeune, and heavy rains ruined approximately 1,000 acres (400 ha) of soybeans and 50 acres (20 ha) of sweet potatoes. Winds and rains destroyed about $1.7 million worth of crops in Carteret County, while tides destroyed roughly 40 ft (12 m) of Emerald Isle's fishing pier.

Rough seas in Virginia, caused by a pressure gradient between Diana and a high-pressure area, led to a boat being capsized in the Potomac River near the mouth of Monroe Creek, which is near Colonial Beach. The vessel capsized, leading to the deaths of an elderly couple, while two other people were rescued. The extratropical remnants of Diana produced up to 2.26 in (57.3 mm) of precipitation and rough seas in Atlantic Canada, damaging some boats. Waves swept over the ship Belle Blonde, sweeping two people overboard, one of whom was rescued but the other presumably drowned.

Following the storm, North Carolina Governor Jim Hunt inspected damage from Diana twice as he flew overhead, while United States Senator Jesse Helms requested that President Ronald Reagan designate certain communities as "disaster areas." President Reagan did so, declaring five North Carolina counties as a federal disaster area and allowing the affected regions to receive government funds and assistance. Funds were also allocated for the repairing of roads and sewers. The American Red Cross delivered roughly 200 lb (91 kg) of dry ice to Long Beach to allow for food to be refrigerated, appealed for donations for the victims, and opened assistance centers in Carolina Beach, Southport, and Wilmington. The Salvation Army spent $25,000 on disaster relief by September 16, which included serving meals at a fire station in Carolina Beach and via mobile canteens. WSJS, a radio station based in Winston-Salem, raised approximately $20,000 by September 15. To deter looting, about 50 National Guard personnel patrolled the streets of Long Beach.

== See also ==
- List of North Carolina hurricanes (1980–1999)
- Other storms of the same name
