= National Register of Historic Places listings in Champaign County, Ohio =

Location of Champaign County in Ohio

This is a list of the National Register of Historic Places listings in Champaign County, Ohio.

This is intended to be a complete list of the properties and districts on the National Register of Historic Places in Champaign County, Ohio, United States. The locations of National Register properties and districts for which the latitude and longitude coordinates are included below, may be seen in an online map.

There are 34 properties and districts listed on the National Register in the county. Another property was once listed but has been removed.

This National Park Service list is complete through NPS recent listings posted May 1, 2026.

== Current listings ==
	Name on the Register	Image	Date listed	Location	City or town	Description
1	Maj. John C. Baker House	Maj. John C. Baker House	August 29, 1985 (#85001875)	202 W. Main St. 40°04′31″N 83°33′35″W	Mechanicsburg	
2	Barr House	Barr House	August 29, 1985 (#85001876)	Locust and Sandusky Sts. 40°04′24″N 83°33′17″W	Mechanicsburg	
3	Henry Burnham House	Henry Burnham House	August 29, 1985 (#85001877)	N. Main St. and State Route 559; 40°04′30″N 83°33′32″W	Mechanicsburg	
4	Church Of Our Savior	Church Of Our Savior	August 29, 1985 (#85001878)	56 S. Main St. 40°04′15″N 83°33′16″W	Mechanicsburg	1890s Gothic Revival church; built in the parish's earliest years
5	Dr. Clark House	Dr. Clark House	August 29, 1985 (#85001879)	21 N. Main St. 40°04′21″N 83°33′24″W	Mechanicsburg	1875 Italianate home of a prominent local physician
6	William Culbertson House	William Culbertson House	August 29, 1985 (#85001880)	103 Race St. 40°04′27″N 83°33′21″W	Mechanicsburg	Italianate home of a local industrialist
7	Demand-Gest House	Demand-Gest House	August 29, 1985 (#85001881)	37 N. Main St. 40°04′23″N 83°33′26″W	Mechanicsburg	Colonial Revival home of local businessmen
8	Hamer's General Store	Hamer's General Store	August 29, 1985 (#85001882)	88 S. Main St. 40°04′12″N 83°33′13″W	Mechanicsburg	A traditional-style general store; no longer standing
9	Norvall Hunter Farm	Norvall Hunter Farm	August 29, 1985 (#85001883)	129 S. Main St. 40°04′03″N 83°33′12″W	Mechanicsburg	
10	Kimball House	Kimball House	August 29, 1985 (#85001884)	115 N. Main St. 40°04′25″N 83°33′29″W	Mechanicsburg	Town home of a prosperous farmer
11	Kiser Mansion	Kiser Mansion	February 4, 2011 (#10001211)	149 E. Main St. 40°07′40″N 83°57′27″W	St. Paris	
12	Lawler's Tavern	Lawler's Tavern	August 29, 1985 (#85001885)	N. Main St. 40°04′20″N 83°33′24″W	Mechanicsburg	1830 inn; one of the oldest buildings in the village
13	Magruder Building	Magruder Building	August 29, 1985 (#85001886)	16 S. Main St. 40°04′19″N 83°33′19″W	Mechanicsburg	
14	Masonic Temple	Masonic Temple	August 29, 1985 (#85001887)	N. Main St. 40°04′21″N 83°33′21″W	Mechanicsburg	
15	Mechanicsburg Baptist Church	Mechanicsburg Baptist Church	August 29, 1985 (#85001888)	Walnut and Sandusky Sts. 40°04′16″N 83°33′27″W	Mechanicsburg	Large Gothic Revival church built for a Methodist Protestant congregation
16	Mechanicsburg Commercial Historic District	Mechanicsburg Commercial Historic District	August 29, 1985 (#85001895)	1-11 S. Main St. 40°04′18″N 83°33′21″W	Mechanicsburg	
17	Monitor House	Monitor House	May 2, 1974 (#74001408)	375 W. Main St. 40°07′46″N 83°58′02″W	St. Paris	A rare example of a house with a monitor
18	Dr. Adam Mosgrove House	Dr. Adam Mosgrove House	July 15, 1982 (#82003550)	127 Miami St. 40°06′29″N 83°45′14″W	Urbana	Home of one of Urbana's earliest doctors
19	Mt. Tabor Church Building, Cemetery and Hitching Lot	Mt. Tabor Church Building, Cemetery and Hitching Lot	November 22, 1995 (#95001329)	State Route 245, 300 meters south of its junction with Mt. Tabor Rd. 40°13′44″N 83°41′38″W	Salem Township	An abandoned Methodist church and cemetery with graves of Revolutionary War veterans
20	Dr. Nincehelser House	Dr. Nincehelser House	August 29, 1985 (#85001889)	28 N. Main St. 40°04′23″N 83°33′24″W	Mechanicsburg	Home of a wealthy physician
21	North Ward District School	North Ward District School	February 21, 2019 (#100003495)	626 N. Russell; 40°06′55″N 83°45′24″W	Urbana	
22	Nutwood Place	Nutwood Place	December 12, 1976 (#76002265)	1428 Nutwood Place; 40°07′36″N 83°45′11″W	Urbana	A farmstead with a brick round barn
23	Carl Potter Mound	Carl Potter Mound	August 13, 1974 (#74001407)	Eastern side of State Route 56, southwest of Mechanicsburg; 40°02′21″N 83°36′05″W	Union Township	A heavily eroded Adena mound
24	Richards-Sewall House	Richards-Sewall House	August 14, 1995 (#95000937)	222 College St. 40°06′14″N 83°45′20″W	Urbana	Formerly home to the Urbana University president
25	St. Michael Catholic Church	St. Michael Catholic Church	August 29, 1985 (#85001892)	40 Walnut St. 40°04′20″N 83°33′30″W	Mechanicsburg	Small Gothic Revival church in a residential neighborhood
26	St. Paul AME Church	St. Paul AME Church	September 5, 1997 (#97000954)	316 E. Market St. 40°06′25″N 83°44′56″W	Urbana	1870s church building; home to a church founded in the 1820s
27	Scioto Street Historic District	Scioto Street Historic District	February 9, 1984 (#84002908)	Scioto St. from Locust to E. Lawn Ave. 40°06′28″N 83°44′45″W	Urbana	
28	Second Baptist Church	Second Baptist Church	August 29, 1985 (#85001891)	Sandusky St. 40°04′21″N 83°33′17″W	Mechanicsburg	Mechanicsburg's oldest extant church building, a Greek Revival structure
29	South Ward District School	South Ward District School	February 21, 2019 (#100003496)	725 S. Main St. 40°05′59″N 83°45′11″W	Urbana	
30	United Methodist Church	United Methodist Church	August 29, 1985 (#85001893)	N. Main and Race Sts. 40°04′24″N 83°33′26″W	Mechanicsburg	Gothic Revival church with a central dome
31	Urbana College Historic Buildings	Urbana College Historic Buildings	October 3, 1980 (#80002952)	College Way; 40°06′08″N 83°45′43″W	Urbana	The oldest buildings on the Urbana University campus
32	Urbana Country Club	Urbana Country Club	June 8, 2018 (#100002550)	4761 E. U.S. Route 36; 40°06′24″N 83°39′36″W	Union Township	
33	Urbana Monument Square Historic District	Urbana Monument Square Historic District	March 1, 1984 (#84002909)	Roughly bounded by Market, Walnut, Church, and Locust Sts. 40°06′29″N 83°45′09″W	Urbana	Urbana's commercial district, centered around a roundabout with a war memorial
34	Village Hobby Shop	Village Hobby Shop	August 29, 1985 (#85001894)	N. Main St. 40°04′20″N 83°33′23″W	Mechanicsburg	Small Italianate commercial building
35	John Q.A. Ward House	John Q.A. Ward House	July 30, 1974 (#74001409)	335 College St. 40°06′12″N 83°45′27″W	Urbana	1820 home of a local sculptor

== Former listing ==
	Name on the Register	Image	Date listed	Date removed	Location	City or town	Description
1	Levi Rathburn House	Levi Rathburn House	August 29, 1985 (#85001890)	December 24, 1990	Locust and Sandusky Streets; 40°04′23″N 83°33′18″W	Mechanicsburg	

== See also ==
- List of National Historic Landmarks in Ohio
- Listings in neighboring counties: Clark, Logan, Madison, Miami, Shelby, Union
- National Register of Historic Places listings in Ohio
