= William Culbertson House =

Historic residence in Ohio

- U.S. National Register of Historic Places
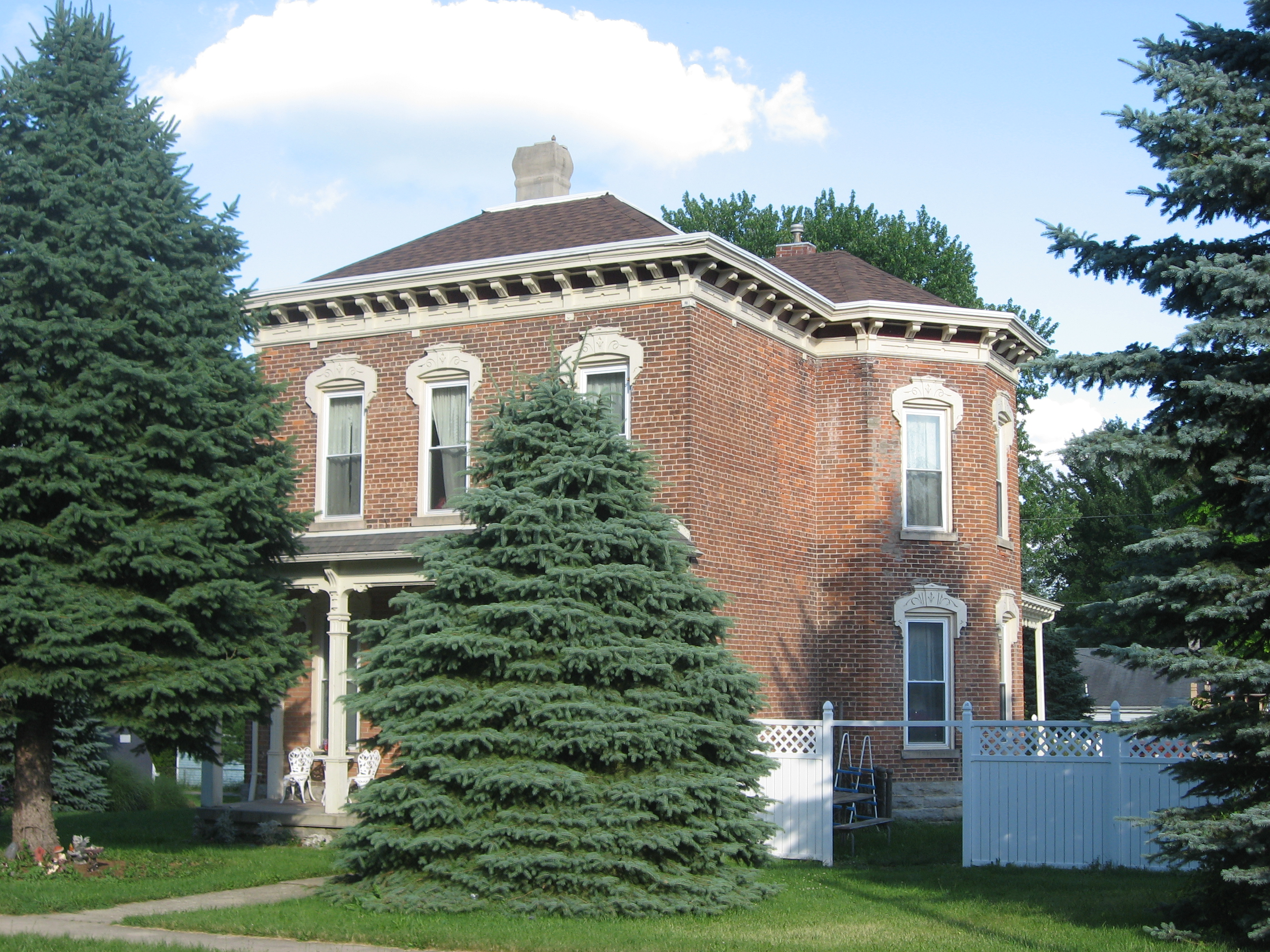
- Front and eastern side

- Location within Ohio Location within the United States
- Interactive map showing the location of William Culbertson House
- Location: 103 Race St., Mechanicsburg, Ohio
- Coordinates: 40°4′27″N 83°33′21″W
- Area: Less than 1 acre (0.40 ha)
- Built: 1875
- Architectural style: Italianate
- MPS: Mechanicsburg MRA
- NRHP reference No.: 85001880
- Added to NRHP: August 29, 1985

The William Culbertson House is a historic residence in the village of Mechanicsburg, Ohio, United States. Constructed in the final quarter of the nineteenth century, it was once the home of one of the village's premier businessmen, and it has been named a historic site.

== History ==
Born in New York in 1833, William Culbertson was raised in Warren, Ohio, where he learned the trade of a carriagemaker. Upon moving to Mechanicsburg in 1853, he worked as a journeyman for three years before beginning his own carriage manufacturing business in 1856 with Cyrus Barr. Their partnership was highly successful; by 1880, Culbertson and Barr had developed a reputation as one of the region's premier manufacturers of carriages, buggies, and spring wagons, as well as operating a livery from 1860 to 1874 and remaining a well-reputed repair center. One year later, Culbertson had his residence built, fifteen years after Barr had arranged for the construction of his house. Culbertson himself was active in local society; he was a member of the Mechanicsburg Methodist Protestant Church and the Odd Fellows, and was the Prohibitionist candidate in numerous local elections. The firm remained in business into the twentieth century, weathering the transition to mechanization by becoming a dealer for Ford, Hudson, and Jeffery cars, but the business burned in a catastrophic 1936 fire that was so large that it damaged the tower of the adjacent Second Baptist Church. As a result, the Culbertson and Barr residences are the sole remaining buildings associated with the firm.

== Architecture ==
Built of brick on a stone foundation, the William Culbertson House is a two-story building with a hip roof. Numerous elements combine to make it a typical example of the Italianate style, including its irregular floor plan with a large bay that projects eastward from the main body of the house, a cornice formed by ornamental brackets, a decorative front porch, and hood molds over the windows.

== Preservation ==
In 1985, the Culbertson House was listed on the National Register of Historic Places, qualifying both because of its historical architecture and its place as the home of a prominent local citizen. Approximately twenty other Mechanicsburg buildings were listed on the National Register at the same time as part of a multiple property submission; a historic district nomination had been considered, but the historic buildings were too few and far between to warrant designation as a group, so they were nominated individually. Among the other buildings in the group was the Mechanicsburg United Methodist Church, located one block away on Race Street at its intersection with Main Street.
