= Choctaw Lake, Ohio =

- Census-designated place
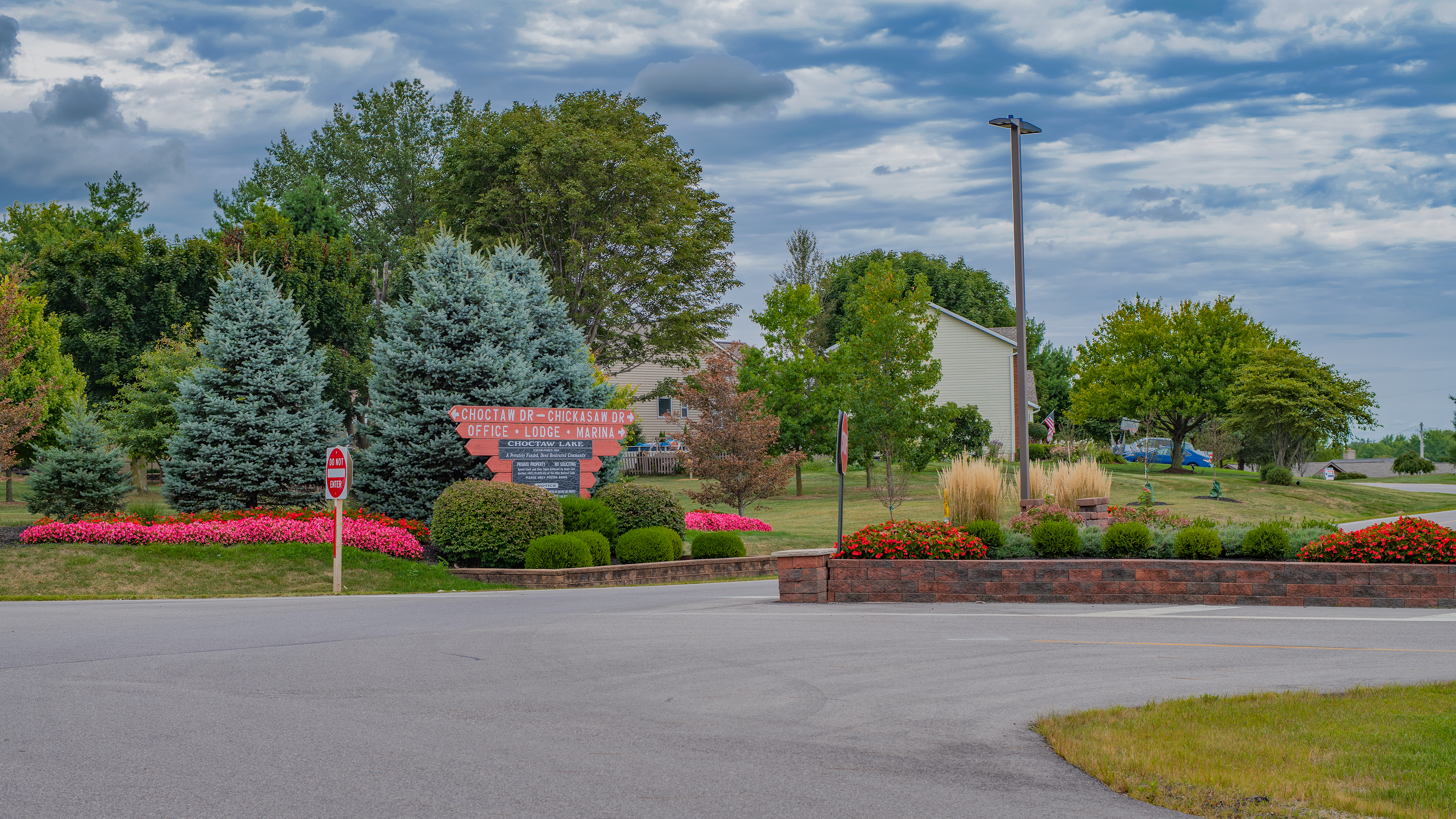
- Sign at the entrance of the Choctaw Lake community

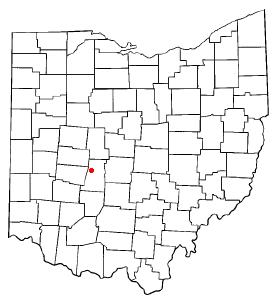
- Location of Choctaw Lake, Ohio
- Coordinates: 39°57′39″N 83°29′15″W
- Country: United States
- State: Ohio
- County: Madison
- Township: Somerford

Area
  - Total: 1.44 sq mi (3.74 km^{2})
  - Land: 1.04 sq mi (2.69 km^{2})
  - Water: 0.41 sq mi (1.06 km^{2})
- Elevation: 1,053 ft (321 m)

Population (2020)
  - Total: 2,047
  - Density: 1,973/sq mi (761.8/km^{2})
- Time zone: UTC-5 (Eastern (EST))
  - Summer (DST): UTC-4 (EDT)
- ZIP Code: 43140 (London)
- FIPS code: 39-14288
- GNIS feature ID: 2393377
- Website: choctawlake.com

Choctaw Lake is an unincorporated community and census-designated place (CDP) in Madison County, Ohio, United States. The population was 2,047 at the 2020 census, up from 1,546 in 2010.

== Geography ==
The community is in western Madison County, in the south-central part of Somerford Township. It is built around a lake of the same name, an impoundment on Deer Creek, a tributary of the Scioto River.

The community is 1 mile (1.6 km) north of Interstate 70 and 7 miles (11 km) north-northwest of London, the Madison county seat. Ohio State Route 56 runs past the southwest corner of the community, leading southeast into London and northwest 12 miles (19 km) to Mutual. State Route 187 travels past the west side of Choctaw Lake, leading north 9 miles (14 km) to Mechanicsburg.

According to the U.S. Census Bureau, the Choctaw Lake CDP has a total area of 1.4 square miles (3.6 km^{2}), of which 1.1 square miles (2.8 km^{2}) are land and 0.4 square miles (1.0 km^{2}), or 28.24%, are water.

== Demographics ==
Historical population
Census	Pop.	Note	%±
1990	1,234		—
2000	1,562		26.6%
2010	1,546		−1.0%
2020	2,047		32.4%
U.S. Decennial Census

As of the census of 2000, there were 1,562 people, 581 households, and 493 families residing in the CDP. The population density was 1,946.0 inhabitants per square mile (751.4/km^{2}). There were 623 housing units at an average density of 776.2 per square mile (299.7/km^{2}). The racial makeup of the CDP was 95.65% White, 0.26% African American, 0.19% Native American, 2.75% Asian, 0.45% from other races, and 0.70% from two or more races. Hispanic or Latino of any race were 0.51% of the population.

There were 581 households, out of which 36.5% had children under the age of 18 living with them, 78.8% were married couples living together, 3.8% had a female householder with no husband present, and 15.0% were non-families. 11.2% of all households were made up of individuals, and 3.4% had someone living alone who was 65 years of age or older. The average household size was 2.69 and the average family size was 2.91.

In the CDP the population was spread out, with 25.4% under the age of 18, 4.1% from 18 to 24, 32.6% from 25 to 44, 30.7% from 45 to 64, and 7.2% who were 65 years of age or older. The median age was 39 years. For every 100 females there were 102.6 males. For every 100 females age 18 and over, there were 98.3 males.

The median income for a household in the CDP was $81,644, and the median income for a family was $86,670. Males had a median income of $47,652 versus $40,588 for females. The per capita income for the CDP was $30,624. About 4.0% of families and 6.9% of the population were below the poverty line, including 15.1% of those under age 18 and none of those age 65 or over.
