= Ohio State Route 187 =

State highway in central Ohio, US

State Route 187

Route information
- Maintained by ODOT
- Length: 8.22 mi (13.23 km)
- Existed: 1931–present

Major junctions
- South end: SR 56 near London
- North end: SR 29 near Mechanicsburg

Location
- Country: United States
- State: Ohio
- Counties: Madison, Champaign

Highway system
- Ohio State Highway System; Interstate; US; State; Scenic
← SR 186	→ SR 188

State Route 187 (SR 187) is a 8.22-mile (13.23 km) north–south state highway in the central portion of the U.S. state of Ohio. The southern terminus of SR 187 is at a T-intersection with SR 56 approximately 4.25 miles (6.84 km) northwest of London. Its northern terminus is at a T-intersection with SR 29 about one mile (1.6 km) to the southeast of Mechanicsburg.

== Route description ==
SR 187 begins its journey at its junction with SR 56 in Madison County's Somerford Township, approximately one mile (1.6 km) to the northwest of the SR 56 interchange off of Interstate 70. Starting out to the north-northeast, SR 187 is lined with a number of homes as it traverses just to the west of Choctaw Lake. Continuing on, the highway enters into an area dominated by farmland for the remainder of SR 187's trek, with houses appearing every so often. SR 187 intersects Arbuckle Road, curves to the north-northwest, then bends ever so slightly into a more northward direction as it arrives at its intersection with Tradersville-Brighton Road. North of there, SR 187 turns to the northwest, and passes by Lewis Road. Less than one mile (1.6 km) northwest of the Lewis Road intersection, SR 187 crosses into Champaign County.

Now traveling through Goshen Township, SR 187 jogs briefly to the west, then resumes a northwesterly trend, arriving at its intersection with Davisson Road. The highway passes by a cluster of homes, meets Wren Road, then curves to the northeast. SR 187 continues in this direction for a stretch, then turns to the northwest, and a short time later, comes to an end as it meets SR 29 at a sharp angle, approximately one mile (1.6 km) to the southeast of Mechanicsburg.

== History ==
SR 187 first appeared on maps in 1931, following the routing that it occupies today. No major changes have taken place to SR 187 since its designation.

== Major intersections ==
County	Location	mi	km	Destinations	Notes
Madison	Somerford Township	0.00	0.00	SR 56 – London, Urbana	
Champaign	Goshen Township	8.22	13.23	SR 29	
1.000 mi = 1.609 km; 1.000 km = 0.621 mi
