= Norvall Hunter Farm =

- U.S. National Register of Historic Places
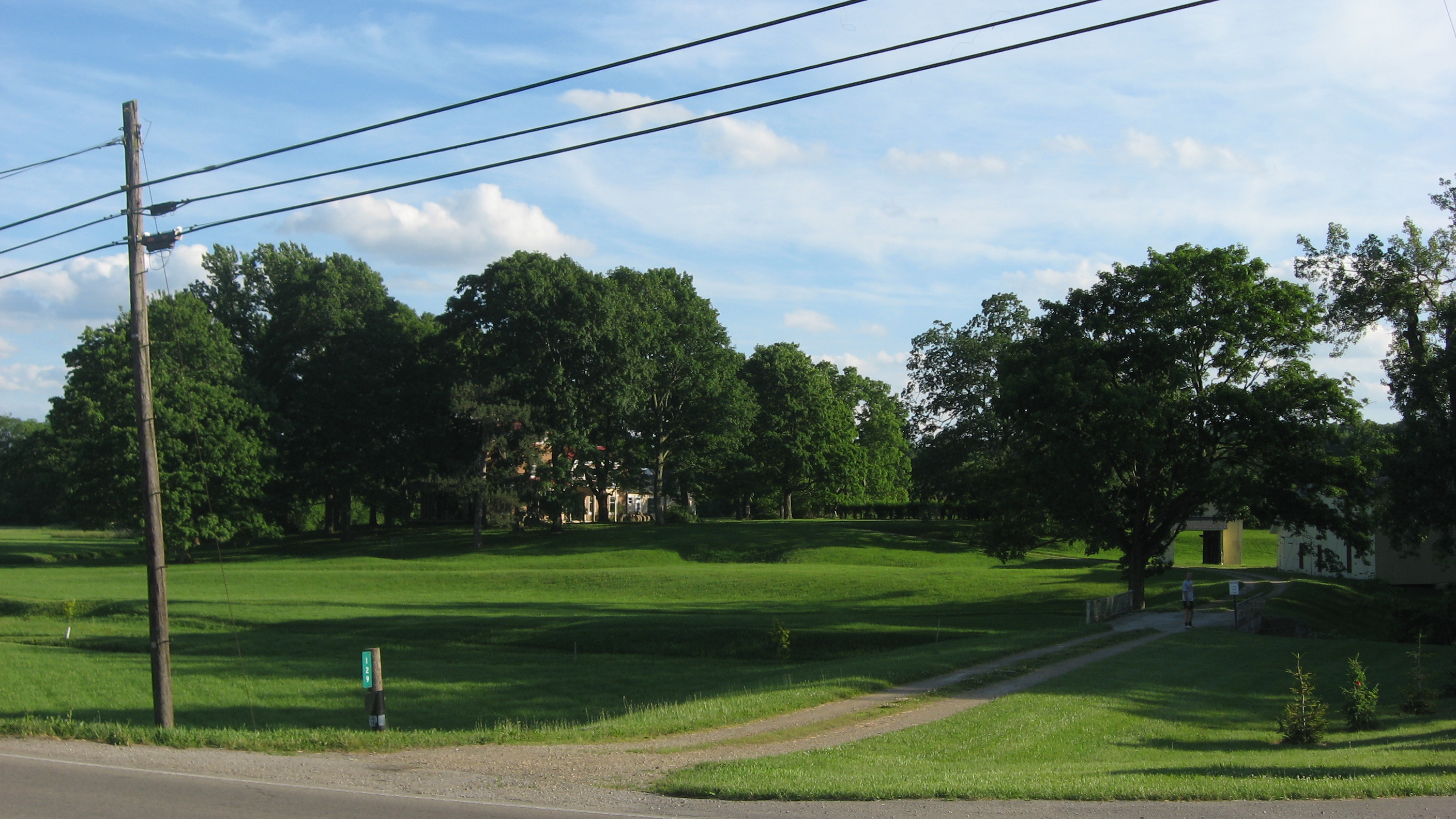
- Roadside view of the farm

- Location within Ohio Location within the United States
- Location: 129 S. Main St., Mechanicsburg, Ohio
- Coordinates: 40°4′3″N 83°33′12″W
- Area: 11 acres (4.5 ha)
- Built: 1850
- Architectural style: Greek Revival, Italianate
- MPS: Mechanicsburg MRA
- NRHP reference No.: 85001883
- Added to NRHP: August 29, 1985

The Norvall Hunter Farm is a historic farmstead on the edge of the village of Mechanicsburg, Ohio, United States. Established in the middle of the nineteenth century, the farm was once home to one of the village's first professionals, and it has been named a historic site because of its distinctive architecture.

== Residents ==
One of Mechanicsburg's first doctors, Obed Horr was also among its earliest businessmen. Operating a store in partnership with Joseph C. Brand from 1832 to 1837. he was successful enough to build his net worth to $4,000 by 1836. Besides practicing medicine and keeping his store, Horr was an active member of the community: he was the first Worshipful Master of the Mechanicsburg Masonic lodge, starting at the lodge's establishment in 1843; he was a prominent citizen, judge, and he trained others for the medical profession. Horr died at Mechanicsburg. In 1863, a family of Hunters settled in Mechanicsburg, having emigrated ultimately from Virginia, and within the year they had purchased Horr's home.

== Buildings ==
The Hunter Farm comprises eleven historic buildings, centered on the high-style farmhouse. Built in 1850, the farmhouse is a two-story structure built of brick; architectural elements such as its pilasters and recessed entryway are constructed with evidence of influence from both the Greek Revival and Italianate styles. Three barns, three sheds, two other farm-related buildings, an additional storage building, and a garage form the rest of the farm complex; these ten outbuildings and a privy are placed in two clusters.

== Preservation ==
In 1985, the Norvall Hunter Farm was listed on the National Register of Historic Places, qualifying both because of its distinctive historic architecture and because of its place as the home of a leading local citizen. It is one of twenty Mechanicsburg locations on the Register; all were listed at the same time as part of a multiple property submission because the village's high proportion of non-historic buildings frustrated locals' initial hopes of designating a larger historic district.
