= Summerford =

Summerford may refer to:

- Summerford, Newfoundland and Labrador, Canada
- Summerford, Ohio, United States
- Walter Summerford, a man alleged to have been struck by lightning four times, including in his grave.
- Glenn Summerford, a snake-handling preacher convicted of attempted murder, described in the 1998 non-fiction book Salvation on Sand Mountain

== See also ==
- Somerford (disambiguation)
