= Church of Our Saviour (Mechanicsburg, Ohio) =

Historic church in Ohio, United States

- Church Of Our Savior
- U.S. National Register of Historic Places
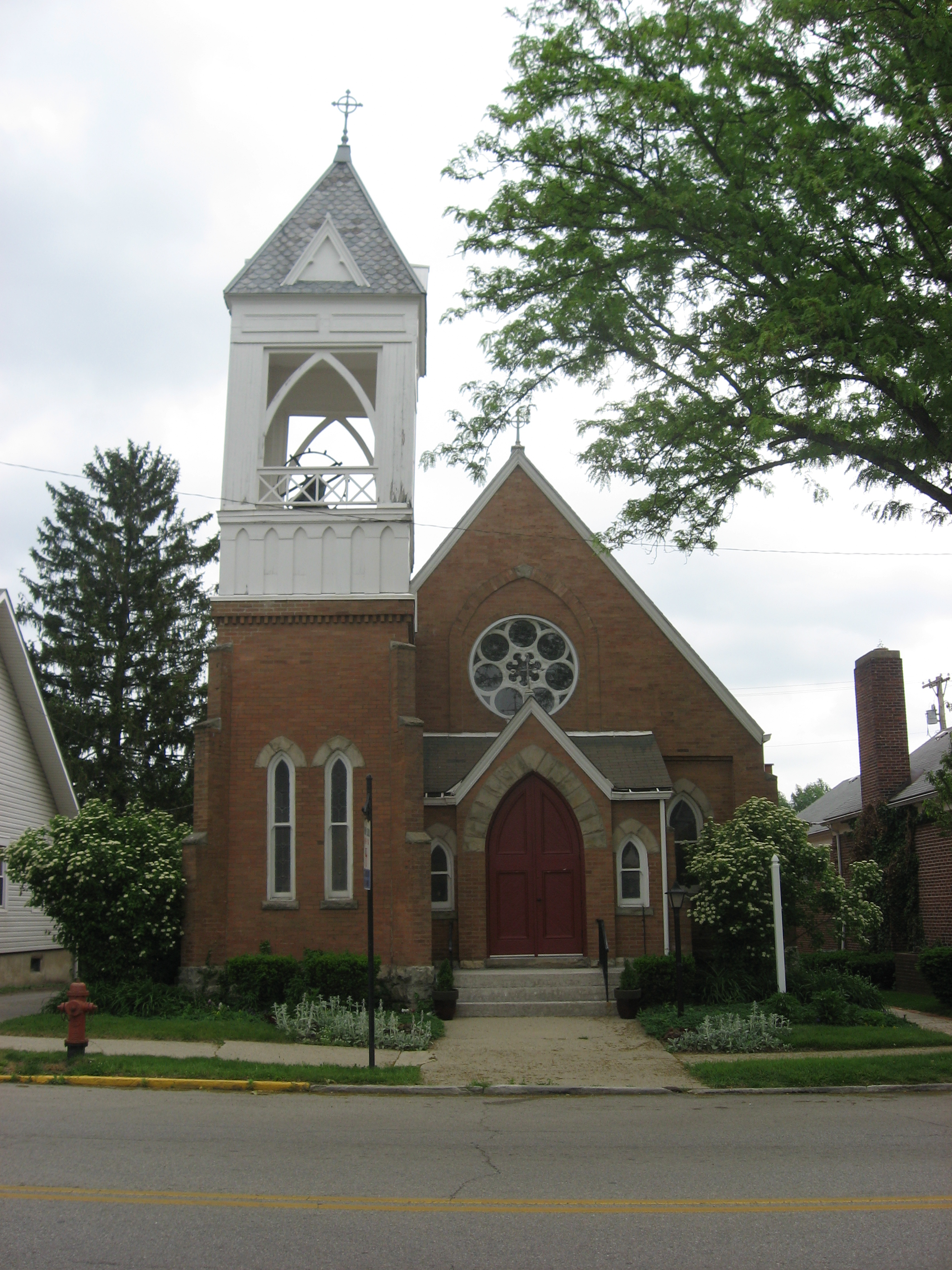
- Façade of the church

- Location within Ohio Location within the United States
- Location: S. Main St., Mechanicsburg, Ohio
- Coordinates: 40°4′15″N 83°33′16″W
- Area: Less than 1 acre (0.40 ha)
- Built: 1893
- Architectural style: Gothic Revival
- MPS: Mechanicsburg MRA
- NRHP reference No.: 85001878
- Added to NRHP: August 29, 1985

The Church of Our Saviour is a historic Episcopal parish in the village of Mechanicsburg, Ohio, United States. Founded in the 1890s, it is one of the youngest congregations in the village, but its Gothic Revival-style church building that was constructed soon after the parish's creation has been named a historic site.

In 2023, the church reported 78 members. No membership statistics were reported in 2024 national parochial reports. Plate and pledge financial support reported by the church in 2024 was $56,004. Average Sunday Attendance (ASA) reported in 2024 was 25 persons. This was a relative decrease on ASA of 34 in 2023.

== Organic history ==
The first settlers in Goshen Township arrived circa 1805, and Mechanicsburg was platted on 6 August 1814. Organized religion was rare in the earliest years; the first churches were established by circuit-riding preachers from the Methodist Episcopal Church, who founded small religious classes that met in settlers' log cabins. Mechanicsburg's first church was a Methodist congregation organized in 1814, and by the 1880s the village boasted four additional churches: Baptist, black Baptist, African Methodist Episcopal, and Methodist Protestant.

Champaign County's first Protestant Episcopal church was the Church of the Epiphany on the eastern side of the county seat of Urbana; it was created in 1847, nearly fifty years before a parish was formed in Mechanicsburg. Under the leadership of a five-man executive committee, the Church of Our Saviour was organized in 1892; the parish saw its first church building completed in the following year, although 1894 arrived before the building was dedicated. The first priest was F.V. Baer, and by the end of the 1890s, the members had bought an additional lot and were preparing to build a new rectory upon it. Although the early members remained loyal to their church, it was frequently weakened by deaths and movement away from the community in its early years. Nevertheless, the parish remained active, and its presence was welcomed by Mechanicsburg's other churches; within its first quarter-century of existence, the members formed an active Sunday school and founded multiple organizations for the female members.

== Architecture ==
Constructed in 1893, dedicated in 1894, and rededicated in 1895, the Church of Our Saviour is a Gothic Revival structure. In its early years, its pipe organ, brass altar, and windows were deemed its most distinctive elements, all of which prompted a local author to declare that "both the exterior and interior are very attractive" in 1907. Built of brick on a stone foundation and featuring elements of wood and stone, the single-story church is covered with a composite roof rising to a central gable. The windows that attracted the attention of authors in the early twentieth century are stained glass; most are ogive windows, but the center of the facade features a rose window. A square brick tower with a wooden belfry sits at one corner of the building; additional stained glass windows are placed in the tower, and ornamental wooden carvings adorn the belfry. Architecturally, it is not unique; three of Mechanicsburg's five historic church buildings were constructed in the 1890s, and four of the five are brick buildings with stained-glass ogive windows.

== Recent history ==
The Church of Our Saviour was listed on the National Register of Historic Places in 1985. It was part of a multiple property submission of approximately twenty buildings, scattered throughout the village in such a low concentration that a historic district designation was not practical. While many of the other buildings were houses, four were the village's other historic churches: the Mechanicsburg Baptist Church, St. Michael's Catholic Church, the Second Baptist Church, and the United Methodist Church. Like all four of the others, the Church of Our Saviour qualified for inclusion on the Register because of its historically significant architecture.

A member parish of the Protestant Episcopal Church in the United States of America, the Church of Our Saviour is within the jurisdiction of the Diocese of Southern Ohio. It forms a part of the Northwest Deanery, along with the Church of the Epiphany and four other parishes. Together with the Church of the Epiphany, it forms the "Northern Miami Valley Episcopal Cluster"; the two parishes share a priest.
