= St. Michael's Catholic Church (Mechanicsburg, Ohio) =

Historic church in Ohio, United States

- St. Michael Catholic Church
- U.S. National Register of Historic Places
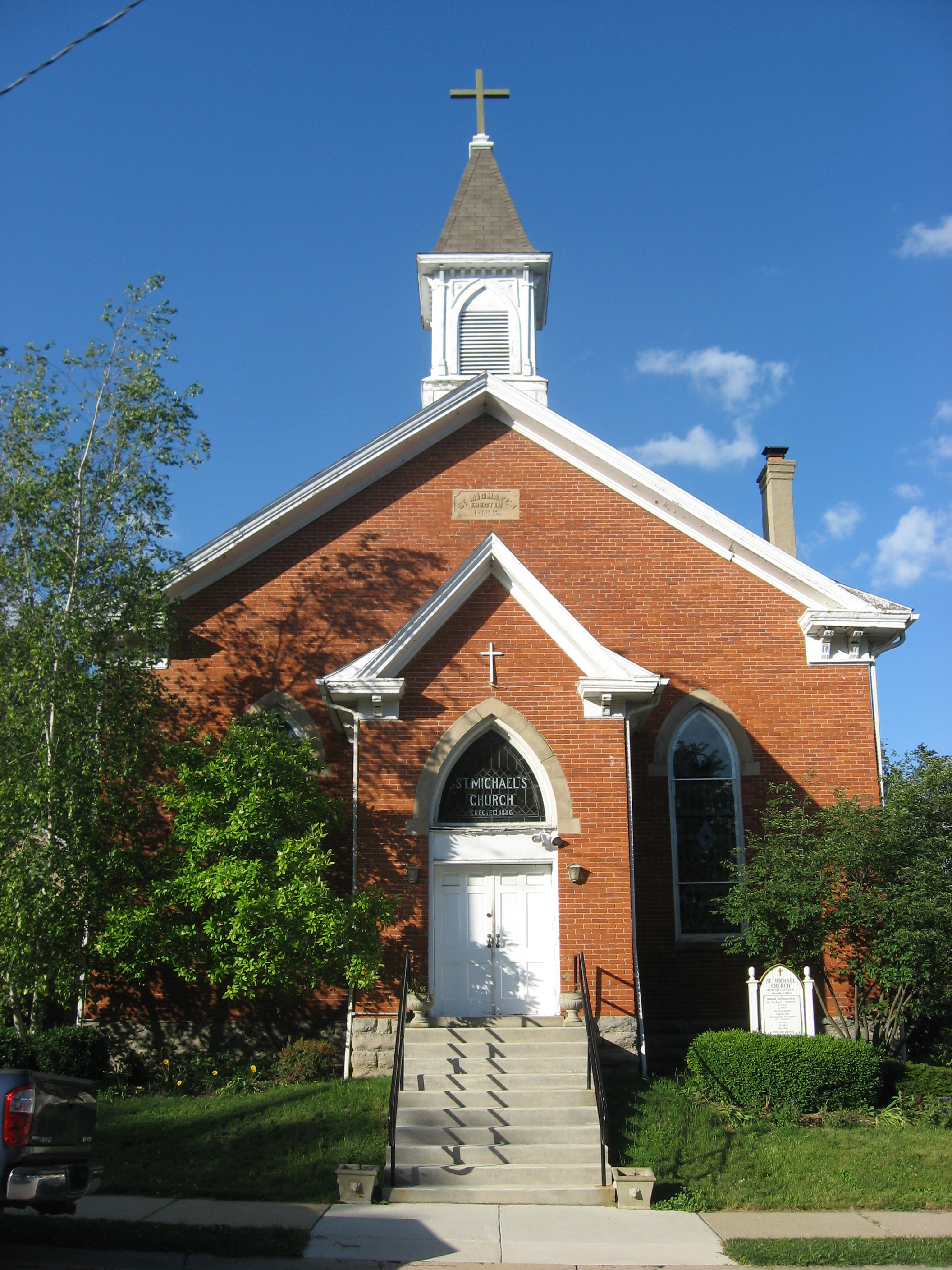
- Front of the church

- Location within Ohio Location within the United States
- Location: 40 Walnut St., Mechanicsburg, Ohio
- Coordinates: 40°4′20″N 83°33′30″W
- Area: Less than 1 acre (0.40 ha)
- Built: 1888
- Architectural style: Gothic Revival
- MPS: Mechanicsburg MRA
- NRHP reference No.: 85001892
- Added to NRHP: August 29, 1985

St. Michael's Catholic Church is a historic Catholic church in Mechanicsburg, a village in Champaign County, Ohio, United States. Completed in the 1880s, it served a group of Catholics who had already been meeting together for nearly thirty years. One of several historic churches in the village, it has been designated a historic site because of its well-preserved nineteenth-century architecture.

== Organic history ==
The first settlers in Goshen Township arrived circa 1805, and Mechanicsburg was platted on 6 August 1814. Organized religion was rare in the earliest years; the first churches were established by circuit-riding preachers from the Methodist Episcopal Church, who founded small religious classes that met in settlers' log cabins. Mechanicsburg's first church was a Methodist congregation organized in 1814, and by the 1880s the village boasted four Protestant churches: Baptist, black Baptist, African Methodist Episcopal, and Methodist Protestant.

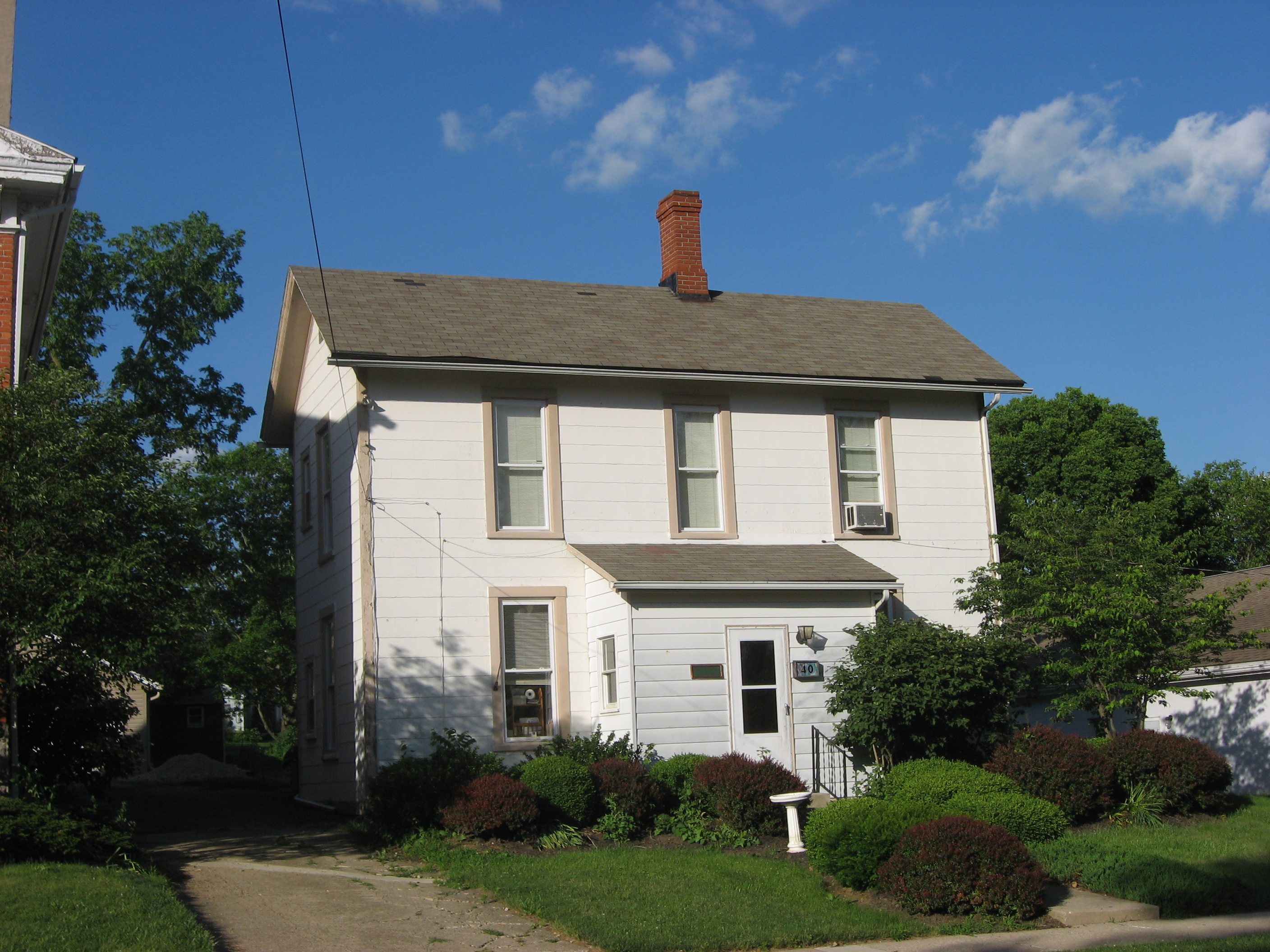
St. Michael's rectory, located next door to the south

Champaign County's earliest Catholics were Irish immigrants, who came to the county seat of Urbana in the 1840s and 1850s as railroad laborers. Viewed with suspicion by their neighbors both because of their nationality and their religion, they received the sacraments only occasionally from travelling priests before the establishment of St. Mary's Church in 1853. Mechanicsburg's first Catholic families, who were also largely Irish, worshipped at St. Mary's or in nearby Rosedale; occasional Masses were said in Mechanicsburg by travelling priests until the congregation was attached to Our Lady of Lourdes parish in Marysville in 1872.

Mass was first celebrated in Mechanicsburg in 1859, the parish was canonically erected in 1865, and it gained a more permanent organization in 1880. By the end of the 1880s, the parish had witnessed the completion of its church building on Walnut Street. In its earlier decades, the membership included many families who lived in the countryside surrounding Mechanicsburg, and the members' devotion to their church prompted a local author to declare them "extremely faithful in attendance on its services". The parish obtained a rectory in October 1904; a woman who lived on Walnut Street died in that month, and her will included a provision donating her house for use as a rectory. By 1917, the membership consisted of 38 families comprising 135 individuals. The parish operated a Sunday school and multiple small groups for various activities, including a branch of the Society of the Holy Name.

== Architecture ==
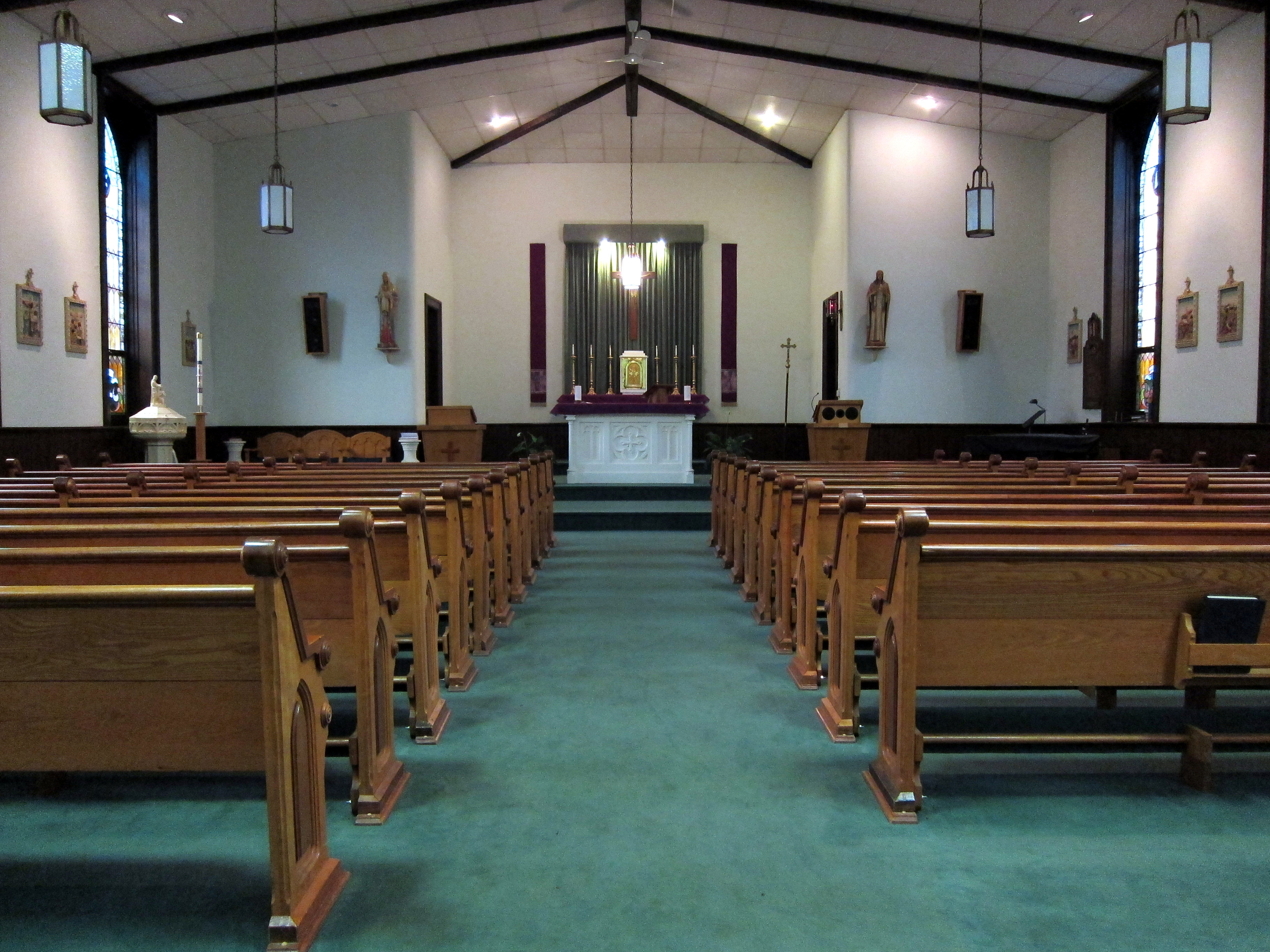
Sanctuary interior

Construction on St. Michael's Church began in 1885. After approximately $5,000 had been spent to complete it, the building was dedicated on Thanksgiving Day 1886 by William Henry Elder, the Archbishop of Cincinnati. Built of brick on a brick foundation and highlighted with stone elements, the church is a three-story building with a composite roof that rises in a gable. Numerous details produce a distinctive Gothic Revival appearance, including the ogive-arched windows and their stone hood molds and the arched bay surrounding the entrance and transom. When these elements combine with non-Gothic components such as the steeple and the brackets under the cornice, the result is an architectural landmark in a street otherwise filled with houses. Its style is comparable to that of several other Gothic Revival churches in Mechanicsburg that were built in the late nineteenth century, despite a remodelling project conducted in 1901.

== Recent history ==
St. Michael's Church was listed on the National Register of Historic Places in 1985. It was part of a multiple property submission of approximately twenty buildings, scattered throughout the village in such a low concentration that a historic district designation was not practical. While many of the other twenty Mechanicsburg buildings were houses, four were the village's other historic churches: the Mechanicsburg Baptist Church, the Church of Our Saviour (Episcopalian), the Second Baptist Church, and the United Methodist Church. Like all four of the others, St. Michael's Church qualified for inclusion on the Register because of its historically significant architecture.

Today, St. Michael's is an active parish of the Archdiocese of Cincinnati. Along with Champaign County's other Catholic churches — St. Mary's in Urbana, Sacred Heart in St. Paris, and Immaculate Conception in North Lewisburg — it is a part of the Springfield Deanery.
