= Somerford =

Somerford may refer to:

== Places ==
=== England ===
- Somerford, Cheshire, a civil parish
  - Somerford Park, Cheshire, a former country house
- Somerford, Dorset, a district of Christchurch
- Somerford Booths, a civil parish in Cheshire
- Somerford Hall, a mansion house in Staffordshire
- Somerford Keynes, a village in Gloucestershire
- Great Somerford, a village in Wiltshire
- Little Somerford, a village in Wiltshire

=== United States ===
- Somerford Township, Madison County, Ohio

== People ==
=== Surname ===
- Thomas Somerford (1881–1948), British architect

== See also ==
- Summerford (disambiguation)
