= Mechanicsburg High School =

Mechanicsburg High School can refer to:

- Mechanicsburg Area Senior High School, Mechanicsburg, Pennsylvania
- Mechanicsburg High School, Mechanicsburg, Ohio
