= Mechanicsburg Baptist Church =

Historic church in Ohio, United States

- U.S. National Register of Historic Places
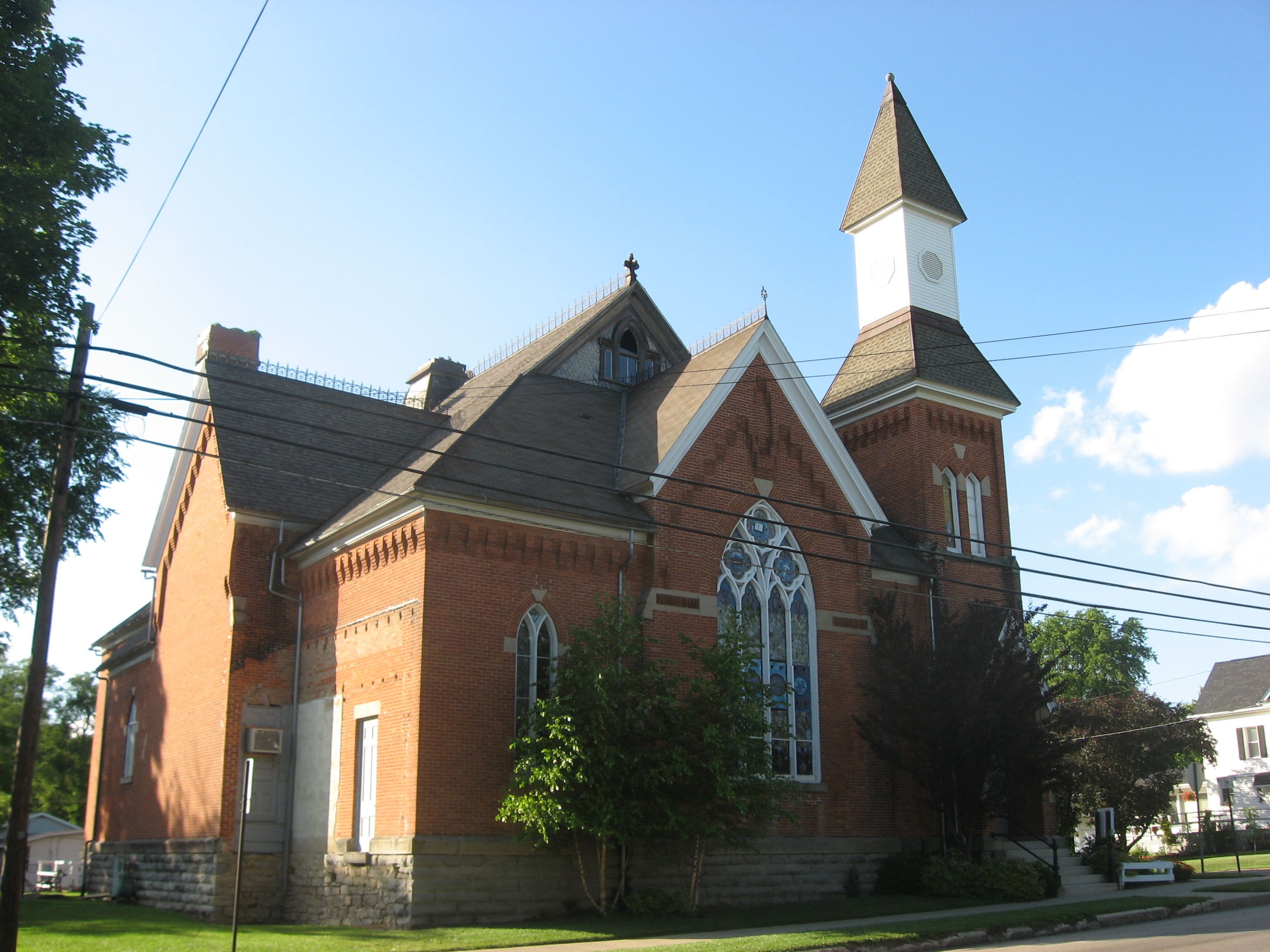
- Front and western side

- Location within Ohio Location within the United States
- Location: Walnut and Sandusky Sts., Mechanicsburg, Ohio
- Coordinates: 40°4′16″N 83°33′27″W
- Area: Less than 1 acre (0.40 ha)
- Built: 1890
- Architectural style: Gothic Revival
- MPS: Mechanicsburg MRA
- NRHP reference No.: 85001888
- Added to NRHP: August 29, 1985

The Mechanicsburg Baptist Church is a historic church in the village of Mechanicsburg, Ohio, United States. Constructed for a Methodist congregation in the late nineteenth century, the building was taken over by Baptists after the original occupants vacated it, and it has been named a historic site.

== Organic history ==
=== Methodist Protestant ===
The first settlers in Goshen Township arrived circa 1805, and Mechanicsburg was platted on 6 August 1814. Organized religion was rare in the earliest years; the first churches were established by circuit-riding preachers from the Methodist Episcopal Church, who founded small religious classes that met in settlers' log cabins. Mechanicsburg's first church was a Methodist congregation organized in 1814, and by the 1880s the village boasted four additional churches: Baptist, black Baptist, African Methodist Episcopal, and Methodist Protestant.

Mechanicsburg's Methodist Protestant church was organized on February 13, 1853, following a directive by the denomination's Ohio Conference from the previous September. Under the initial leadership of S.P. Kezerta, the fledgling church had a charter membership of ninety-two individuals. The national Methodist Protestant Church had been formed by those who dissented from the church government of the Methodist Episcopal Church, objecting to the powers of the church's bishops. Matters were radically different in Mechanicsburg, which had developed a reputation as a "black abolition hole" among those pursuing the many runaway slaves who passed through the town on the Underground Railroad. Turmoil in the national church disturbed many members of the Mechanicsburg Methodist Episcopal Church, and Kazerta gathered a congregation of abolitionist families into a new congregation. The members purchased a lot on West Sandusky Street, upon which a two-story brick church was constructed in 1858. Mechanicsburg's Masonic lodge assisted in construction, and in return they were sold rights to the second story. In its early years, the congregation was weakened by members' departures to other communities or by death, and it was attached to another young congregation in Catawba until 1865. As the years passed, the church grew stronger; membership reached 308 in 1879, at which time the building was remodelled and refurbished, and by 1890 a new building was needed. After concluding the lease with the Masons, the congregation destroyed the old building and erected a new structure on the same lot, and all debts were paid by the end of 1891. It was further strengthened by donations from two members: one gave his home for use as a parsonage, and the other endowed the church's Sunday school. By 1917, the membership had surpassed five hundred. In 1939, the Methodist Protestant Church merged back into the Methodist Episcopal Church, producing The Methodist Church, and the two local congregations subsequently rejoined as well. After the merger, the property was sold to a local Baptist congregation.

=== Baptist ===
Baptists settled in Champaign County very early in its history; many of the county's leading citizens followed the faith, and Kingscreek Baptist Church in Salem Township, founded in 1805, was the third Baptist church to be established anywhere in the state. In the county's early years, all of its numerous Baptist churches were found in the countryside, so in 1840 the Ohio Baptist Convention began to make efforts to plant churches in the villages. One such society arose in Mechanicsburg in the same year; known as Goshen Baptist Church for its first seven years, the church constructed its first church building on Locust Street in 1846. Resources were scarce in the early years, and the resulting building was small, but subsequent growth saw the membership rise to 106 by 1864. From this time forward, the congregation again declined; soon after the death of a prominent member in 1872, the building was sold with the goal of building a better one, but a better one was not built, and membership dropped to 38 by 1883. Most of the members left to form another Baptist church in that year, and the five remaining members deeded the congregation's property to the Ohio Baptist Convention when the congregation closed. The current occupants of the property are unrelated to the previous Baptist churches.

== Architecture ==
The Mechanicsburg Baptist Church is a brick building resting on a stone foundation and covered with a slate roof. Built in the Gothic Revival style, this single-story building possesses architectural features such as decorative elements on the gabled roof, corbelled brickwork, a tower with belfry on the primary corner, and stained-glass windows trimmed with stone. Inside, the church is divided into multiple Sunday school classrooms, a kitchen and dining area, a basement, and a side chapel, in addition to the sanctuary; when completed, the church was equipped with a grand pipe organ and piano and could seat approximately one thousand worshippers, even though the entire population of the village was only twice that number. A prominent component of the interior is a large white marble tablet inscribed with numerous names; many early members of the Methodist Protestant congregation gave substantial sums of money to the church, and their names were remembered by placement on this large stone.

== Historic designation ==
In 1985, the Mechanicsburg Baptist Church was listed on the National Register of Historic Places, qualifying because of its historically significant architecture. Four other Mechanicsburg churches — St. Michael's Catholic Church, Second Baptist Church, the Episcopal Church of Our Saviour, and the United Methodist Church — were listed on the National Register at the same time. Except for the Greek Revival Second Baptist Church, they were deemed important examples of the Gothic Revival style (they were all built around 1890, when the style was popular), and all five were significant as the village's primary architectural landmarks.
