= Hamer's General Store =

- U.S. National Register of Historic Places
- Exterior of the former store; note the prominent false front at top

- Location within Ohio Location within the United States
- Location: 88 S. Main St., Mechanicsburg, Ohio
- Coordinates: 40°4′12″N 83°33′13″W
- Area: Less than 1 acre (0.40 ha)
- Architectural style: Commercial
- MPS: Mechanicsburg MRA
- NRHP reference No.: 85001882
- Added to NRHP: August 29, 1985

Hamer's General Store was a small commercial building on the eastern side of the village of Mechanicsburg, Ohio, United States. Declared a historic site in the 1980s because of its architecture, it is no longer standing.

== Historic context ==
When platted in 1814, Mechanicsburg featured a grid plan centered on two major streets: Sandusky, running northeast–southwest, and Main, running northwest–southeast. Many of the lots along Main Street are small, causing the buildings occupying them to be narrow and constructed with minimal setbacks from the street. Upon one of these lots was built Hamer's General Store in an unknown year in the second half of the nineteenth century. Its name derives from a longtime owner, a Mr. Hamer who operated it from 1960 until selling it in 1983. General stores similar to Hamer's were once common in rural Ohio, but by enduring long after the demise of most others, Hamer's gradually became one of an extremely rare breed.

== Architecture ==
Hamer's General Store was a weatherboarded building with a brick foundation, elements of stone and metal, and a composite roof rising to a gable. Among its most distinctive features was its prominent false front, which was produced by the construction of a tall parapet on the front and its embellishment with brackets and a cornice. The effect of a traditional country store was enhanced by the presence around the entrance of a porch with a shed roof. Throughout its history, the display windows and double doors at and around the entrance were never replaced. While numerous other commercial buildings exist in Mechanicsburg, such as in the downtown commercial district, they are generally substantially different from Hamer's because of their brick construction and Italianate styling.

== Historic site ==
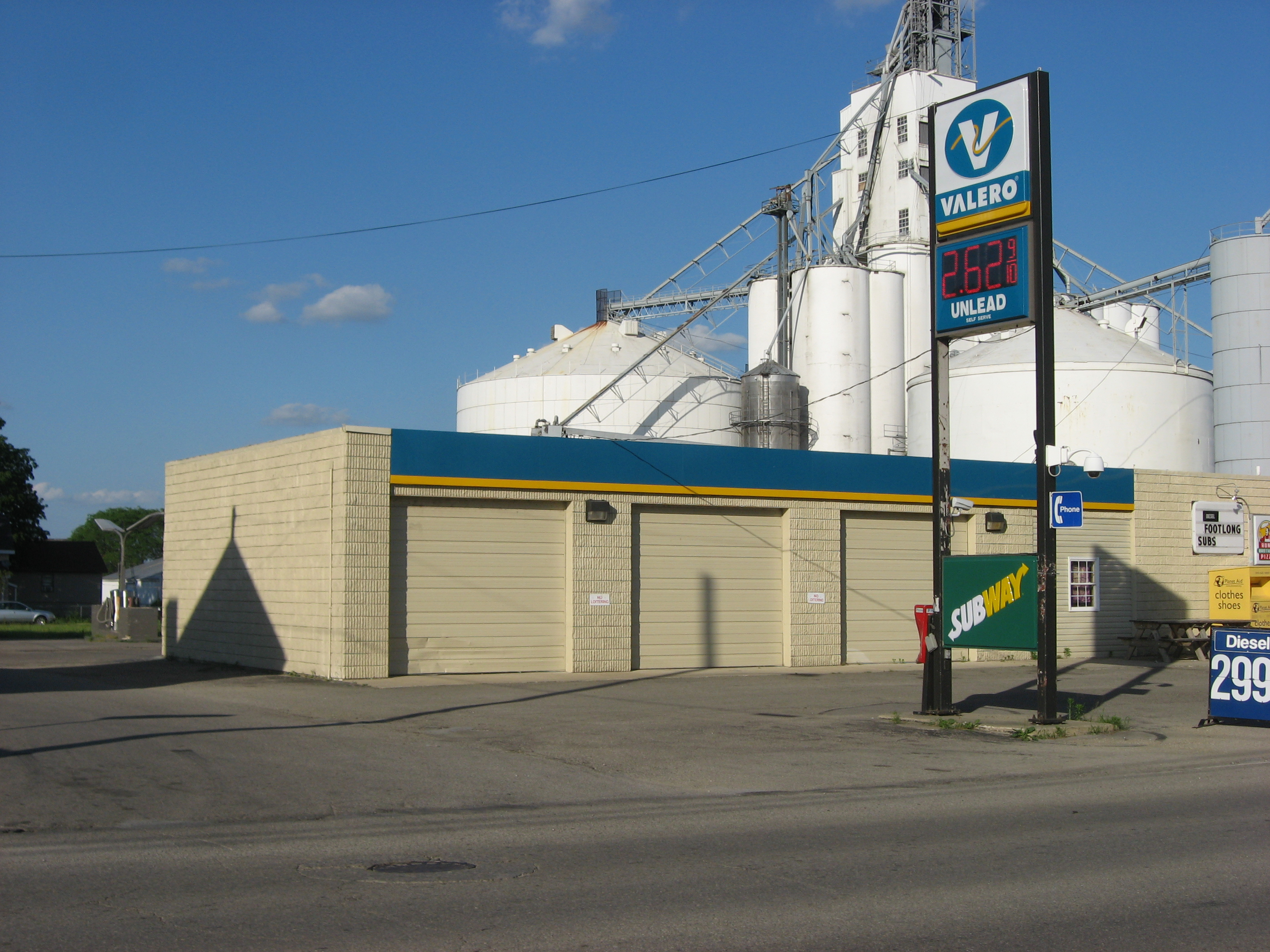
Site of the general store

In 1985, Hamer's General Store was listed on the National Register of Historic Places, qualifying as a rare surviving example of late-nineteenth-century commercial architecture. It was part of a multiple property submission of approximately twenty buildings, scattered throughout the village in such a low concentration that a historic district designation was not practical. Despite this designation, Hamer's is no longer standing; a Valero gas station occupies the site where the store was once located.
