= Second Baptist Church (Mechanicsburg, Ohio) =

Historic church in Ohio, United States

- U.S. National Register of Historic Places
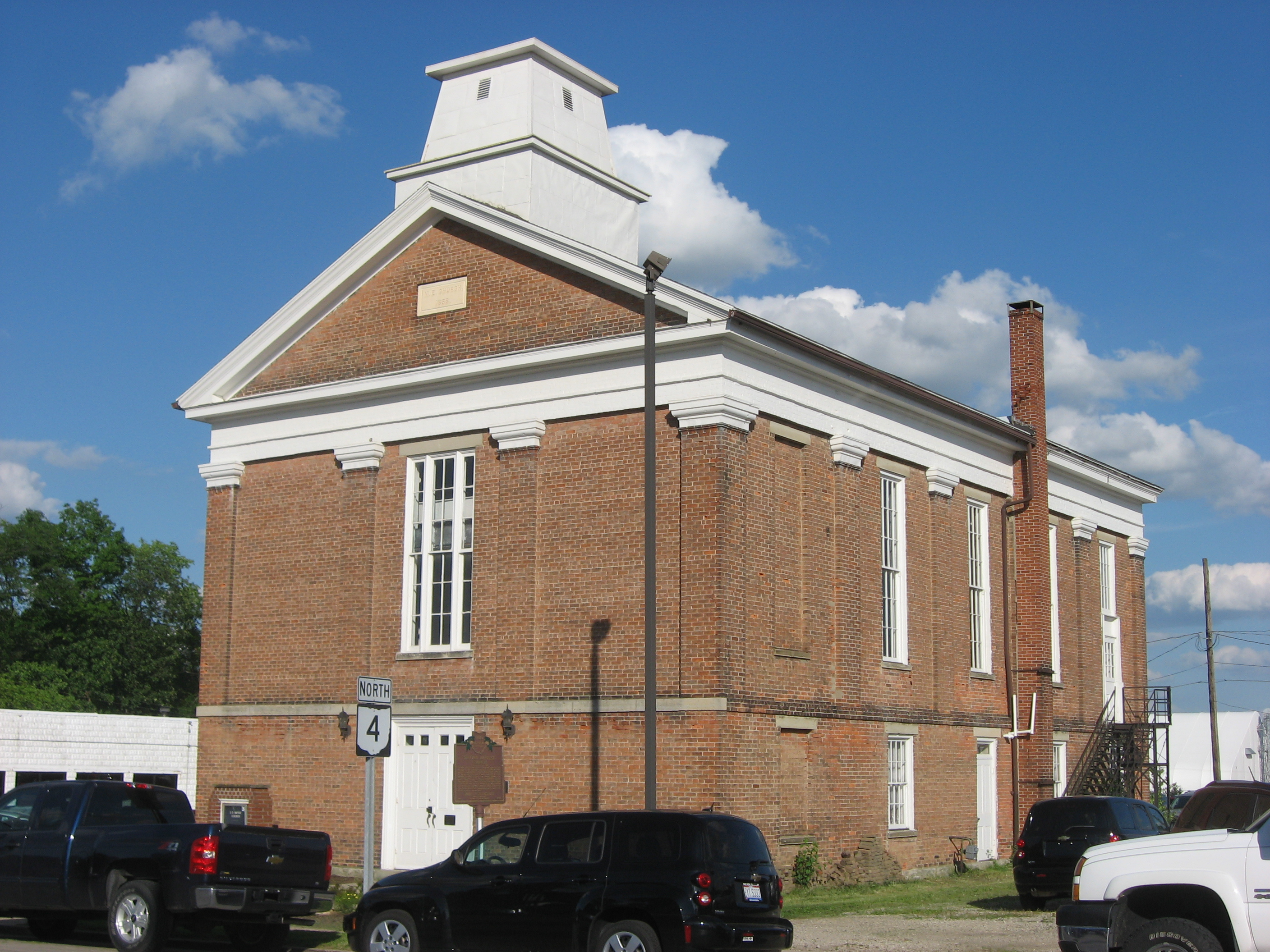
- Front and southwestern side

- Location within Ohio Location within the United States
- Location: E. Sandusky St., Mechanicsburg, Ohio
- Coordinates: 40°4′20″N 83°33′17″W
- Area: Less than 1 acre (0.40 ha)
- Built: 1858
- Architectural style: Greek Revival
- MPS: Mechanicsburg MRA
- NRHP reference No.: 85001891
- Added to NRHP: August 29, 1985

Second Baptist Church is a historic church building in the village of Mechanicsburg, Ohio, United States. Constructed in the mid-19th century, it is the oldest church in the village, and it has been named a historic site.

== Congregational history ==
Mechanicsburg was platted in 1814, and the town grew rapidly in wealth and population. By 1840, the value of real property in the village had surpassed ten thousand dollars, and another forty years saw its value pass one-third of a million dollars. The population likewise grew from 99 in 1830 to 258 in 1840, 682 in 1850, and 1,522 in 1880. From its early years, Mechanicsburg was a multi-racial community; one black resident was recorded in the 1830, and after growing gradually to 53 by 1870, the black population jumped to 209 in 1880.

By the 1880s, Mechanicsburg's black population was large enough to support two separate churches: a Baptist congregation and a congregation of the African Methodist Episcopal Church. Formed in November 1872 with a charter membership of eight, only the Baptist congregation survives of the two; it uses the name "Second Baptist Church", as a white Baptist congregation had been founded in 1840. In 1917, the membership of the congregation and of its Sunday school were recorded as seventy and fifty respectively; in its first forty-five years, the congregation was served by fourteen pastors. One of the ministers, Elmer Curry, founded the Curry Normal and Industrial Institute at the church, modelling it after the Tuskegee Institute, but after a period of operating in Mechanicsburg, the school relocated to Urbana.

== Church building ==
The first religious organization anywhere in Goshen Township was formed by Methodist missionaries. Although the Mechanicsburg Methodist Episcopal Church's membership was small in the earliest years, it grew rapidly as a result of numerous revival meetings, which saw many people converted to Christianity under the preaching of men such as pioneer bishop Francis Asbury. Between 1814 and 1839, they occupied three small church buildings in Mechanicsburg, and growth prompted them to erect a larger brick structure in 1858; they chose a lot that had been used as the village's first cemetery until another cemetery was opened and the bodies were moved to the new location. As the membership approached four hundred by the late 1870s, a thorough renovation project was completed. Nevertheless, growth continued, and an even larger church building was constructed in 1904 several blocks north of the previous one. Accordingly, the congregation sold the old brick edifice to the Second Baptist Church for $2,850, which continued to improve the structure; in 1917, a local author stated that "It is nicely decorated on the interior and is fitted with electric lights." Historically, the church boasted a peaked belfry above its entrance. This structure was cut down in 1936 following a fire at the Culbertson Buggy Works, next door to the church, which was catastrophic enough that the tower was damaged. The church's original bell was removed as a result of the fire and placed in the village school, although in return the smaller school bell was given to the church.

Built of brick with elements of stone, this two-story building is Mechanicsburg's oldest standing church building. Architecturally, it differs greatly from the village's other historic churches; all of the others are Gothic Revival buildings erected around 1890, while Second Baptist is a Greek Revival building that was thirty years old when the oldest of the other buildings was constructed. The churches are typical of Mechanicsburg's built environment; most of the village's historic structures are Gothic Revival, Italianate, or Queen Anne structures from the late nineteenth century, and the only extant significant examples of the pure Greek Revival style are Lawler's Tavern (1830) and Second Baptist Church.

== Preservation ==
The Second Baptist Church was listed on the National Register of Historic Places in 1985. It was part of a multiple property submission of approximately twenty buildings, scattered throughout the village in such a low concentration that a historic district designation was not practical. While many of the other twenty Mechanicsburg buildings were houses, four were the village's other historic churches: the Mechanicsburg Baptist Church (formerly Methodist Protestant), St. Michael's Catholic Church, the Church of Our Saviour (Episcopalian), and the 1904-completed Methodist church building. Like all four of the others, the Second Baptist Church qualified for inclusion on the Register because of its historically significant architecture, and it also was deemed important because of the place that it had played in Ohio's history. Its historic status was further recognized in 2005, when the Ohio Historical Society placed a historical marker for the church along Main Street. The early twenty-first century also saw restoration work performed on the building by the Champaign County Preservation Alliance, which by that point owned the property.
