= Masonic Temple (Mechanicsburg, Ohio) =

- U.S. National Register of Historic Places
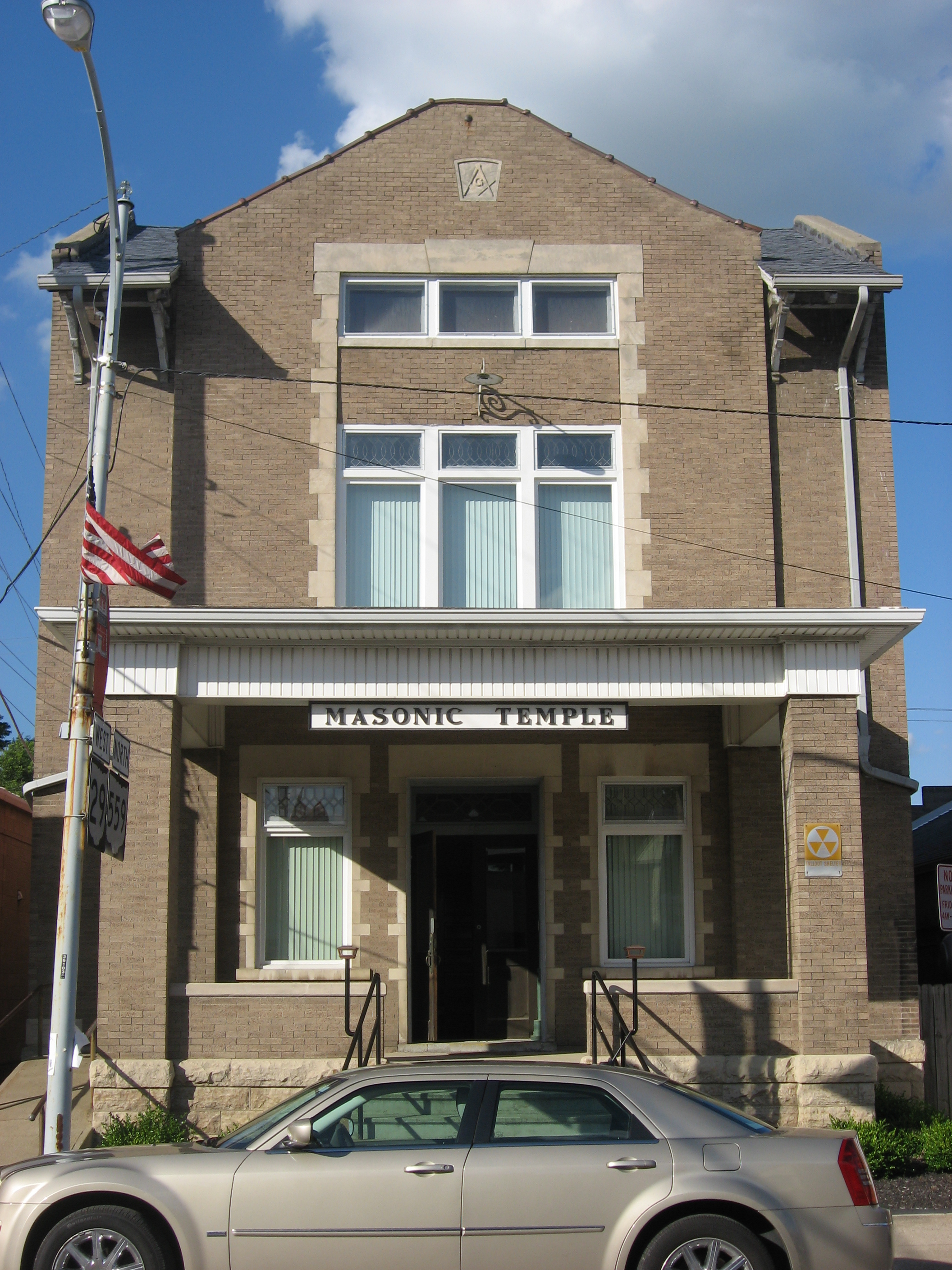
- Front of the temple

- Location within Ohio Location within the United States
- Location: N. Main St., Mechanicsburg, Ohio
- Coordinates: 40°04′21″N 83°33′22″W
- Area: Less than 1 acre (0.40 ha)
- Built: 1909
- Architectural style: American Craftsman
- MPS: Mechanicsburg MRA
- NRHP reference No.: 85001887
- Added to NRHP: August 29, 1985

The Masonic Temple is a historic Masonic temple in the village of Mechanicsburg, Ohio, United States. Built in the 1900s for a local Masonic lodge that had previously met in a succession of buildings owned by others, it is the last extant Mechanicsburg building constructed for a secret society, whether Masonic or otherwise, and it has been designated a historic site because of its well-preserved American Craftsman architecture.

== Lodge history ==
A part of Goshen Township was platted as the community of Mechanicsburg in 1814, and the village was incorporated by an act of the General Assembly in 1834. Clinton Lodge No. 113, F&AM, was chartered in the village nine years later, with Obed Horr as the first Worshipful Master. In their earliest years, the lodge met in assorted locations before finding a home in 1855 in a newly constructed structure: having working together with the village's Methodist Protestant church to build its new two-story building, they owned the building's second story, and the church the first. This arrangement persisted until 1889 and was ended upon the lodge's discovery of structural problems, whereupon they sold their interest in the building to the church and departed (the name being changed to "Mechanicsburg Lodge" around the same time); the church, in turn, had the building destroyed in the following year and replaced it with a newer and more commodious structure. Lodge meetings were held on the second story of a downtown building until the present structure became available. Land was purchased in February 1908, the cornerstone laid in August, and the building formally dedicated in March 1909, construction having cost approximately $20,000. More than two hundred men were members of the lodge in 1917.

== Related organizations ==
At the peak of Mechanicsburg's prosperity and prominence, during the final years of the nineteenth century and the earliest years of the twentieth, several other secret societies were active in the village: the Royal Arch Masons (formed 1899), the Order of the Eastern Star (formed 1894), the Odd Fellows (formed 1855) and women's auxiliary, the black Odd Fellows (formed 1881) and women's auxiliary, the Knights of Pythias (formed 1891) and women's auxiliary, the Improved Order of Red Men (formed 1874), the Modern Woodmen (formed 1900), and the Maccabees (formed 1911). Surpassing one hundred members, both the Odd Fellows and the Knights of Pythias built lodge buildings in the late nineteenth century, but the Pythian Castle burned in 1916, and the same fate later befell the Odd Fellows' building. While the Odd Fellows later purchased the home of Oram Nincehelser, located on Main Street near the Masonic Temple, the latter building is the only extant structure constructed to be the meeting place for a Mechanicsburg secret society.

== Architecture ==
Three stories tall, the Masonic Temple is a brick building set on a stone foundation. Non-structural elements of stone occupy a prominent part of the exterior, serving as the surrounds for the main door and windows. The roof is gabled, and while the gable ends face the sides of the building, an additional gable is oriented toward the street. Multi-pane windows in the additional gable provide light to both the second and third stories, while the main entrance and its flanking windows are sheltered by a porch with square brick pillars. Components such as bracketing shaped with knees, additional multi-pane windows with bevelled slats set as transom lights, and buff brick walls combine to lend the building an American Craftsman appearance. Upon construction, the building's rooms included a club room in the basement, banqueting and reception rooms on the first story, and a lodge meeting room and additional reception space on the second, and virtually no changes have been made to the building since construction was completed.

== Historic site ==
In 1985, the Mechanicsburg Masonic Temple was listed on the National Register of Historic Places, qualifying both because of its place in the community's history and because of its historically significant architecture. It was part of a group of twenty separate Mechanicsburg locations listed on the Register together (the community's numerous historic buildings were too widely scattered to have all of them designated a single historic district), the only one in the American Craftsman style, and aside from five churches, the only one not constructed as a house or as a commercial property.
