= Sue Ernest Hewling =

American musician, band leader and educator

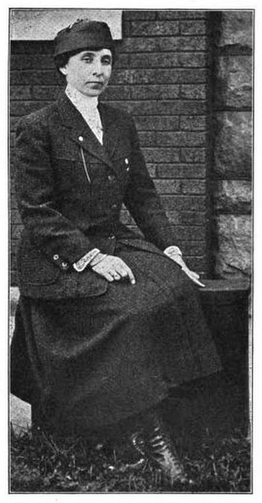
Sue Ernest Hewling, from a 1922 publication.

Sue Ernest Hewling (1882 – May 17, 1962) was an American musician, band leader and educator. Her particular talent for whistling and bird sounds was featured in early novelty recordings and live performances, especially of the Ladies' Rainbow Saxophone Band, which she led.

== Early life ==
Sue Ernest was from Mechanicsburg, Ohio. She first got into music at age 4, playing the harmonica and mouthharp, along with whistling in her church choir and other social events. She studied to play the cornet and saxophone as a teenager, but was already known as a proficient whistler in childhood. She attended the Conn Conservatory in Elkhart, Indiana.

== Career ==
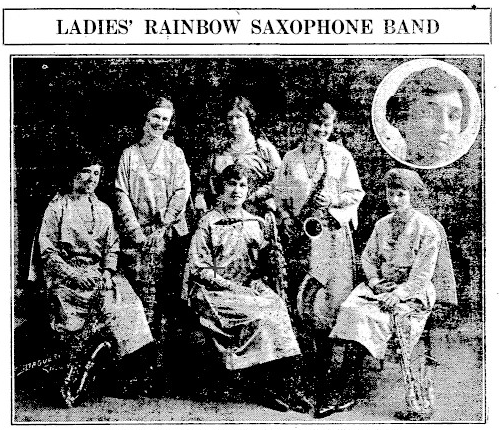
Ladies' Rainbow Saxophone Band, from a 1922 publication.

She toured with various women's orchestras in her career. During World War I she organized the Ladies' Rainbow Saxophone Band (later the Ladies Rainbow Sextet), to entertain troops in camps. The players wore rainbow-themed stage costumes and the lighting carried the theme as well. They toured American cities, college campuses and other gatherings through the 1920s, bringing "a happy, lively mixture of good music", by one newspaper account. The Ladies' Rainbow Saxophone Band entertained President Warren G. Harding during his time in the White House.

In 1921, Hewling was a saleswoman with the Rodeheaver Company, selling recordings of religious music in Chicago. In 1932, she performed at a benefit for unemployed workers in Miami. In 1943 she was a drummer (and, on occasion, whistler) with the Miami All-Women Orchestra.

She and her musical partner Imogene Waldron (a member of the Ladies' Rainbow Saxophone Band) co-wrote and co-directed a children's pageant called "A Trip around the World" performed in Indiana in 1927, and co-directed a variety show in Miami in 1931, with Caesar LaMonaca as the headliner. The pair co-directed a youth harmonica band in Miami in 1934. Hewling and Waldron sometimes performed duets on musical saws, as a novelty act. In 1948, the two women were running a kindergarten together.

== Personal life ==
Sue Ernest married and had a son. From about 1929 she lived with fellow musician Imogene (Imo) Waldron in Miami, Florida. Sue Hewling died there in 1962, aged 80 years.
