= Mechanicsburg High School (Ohio) =

Location
- 60 High Street; Mechanicsburg, (Champaign County), Ohio 43044; United States
- Coordinates: 40°4′35″N 83°33′32″W

Information
- Type: Public, Coeducational high school
- Motto: Best Small School In Ohio
- School district: Mechanicsburg Exempted Village School District
- Superintendent: Danielle Prohaska
- Principal: Jason Shultz
- Grades: 9-12
- Colors: Purple and gold
- Fight song: Fight On!
- Athletics conference: Ohio Heritage Conference
- Mascot: Indian
- Team name: Indians
- Website: www.mechanicsburg.k12.oh.us

Mechanicsburg High School is a public high school in Mechanicsburg, Ohio. It is the only high school in the Mechanicsburg Exempted Village School District.

== Community ==
Mechanicsburg Schools, the “Home of the Indians”, are located in the small village of Mechanicsburg laid out in 1814 on the site of the Shawnee Indian Village of Chief Ohito. Mechanicsburg was also a station on the underground railroad with “conductor” Udney Hyde helping more than 500 slaves on their way to freedom. It is now the home to approximately 4000 people in Champaign County.

=== Ohio High School Athletic Association State Championships ===
- Girls Bowling - 2014, 2016
- Boys Wrestling - 2017
- Boys Bowling - 2018, 2021, 2022

== School history ==
The original elementary building was constructed in 1894 at a cost of $35,000. This building was used for both elementary and high school classes. The elementary grades were on the first floor and the high school was located on the second floor.

The first high school graduating commencement exercises in Mechanicsburg were held June 3, 1880, with two people graduating. In 1920 the front part of the East Elementary building was completed for $75,000 and addition to the rear of that building was completed in 1939 for $38,000. These two buildings met the needs of Mechanicsburg's expanding enrollment until 1950. At this time an additional building that included the front high school building was completed at a cost of $230,000. Two more additions were made in 1956 and 1975, making the total construction cost of the present Mechanicsburg School Buildings around $1,282,000.

In 2003 voters approved a bond issue to construct a new K-12 building. The building was completed in 2007 at a cost of $24,542,000. This new complex includes athletic updates of baseball and softball fields and an all weather track.
