= Summerford, Ohio =

- Unincorporated community
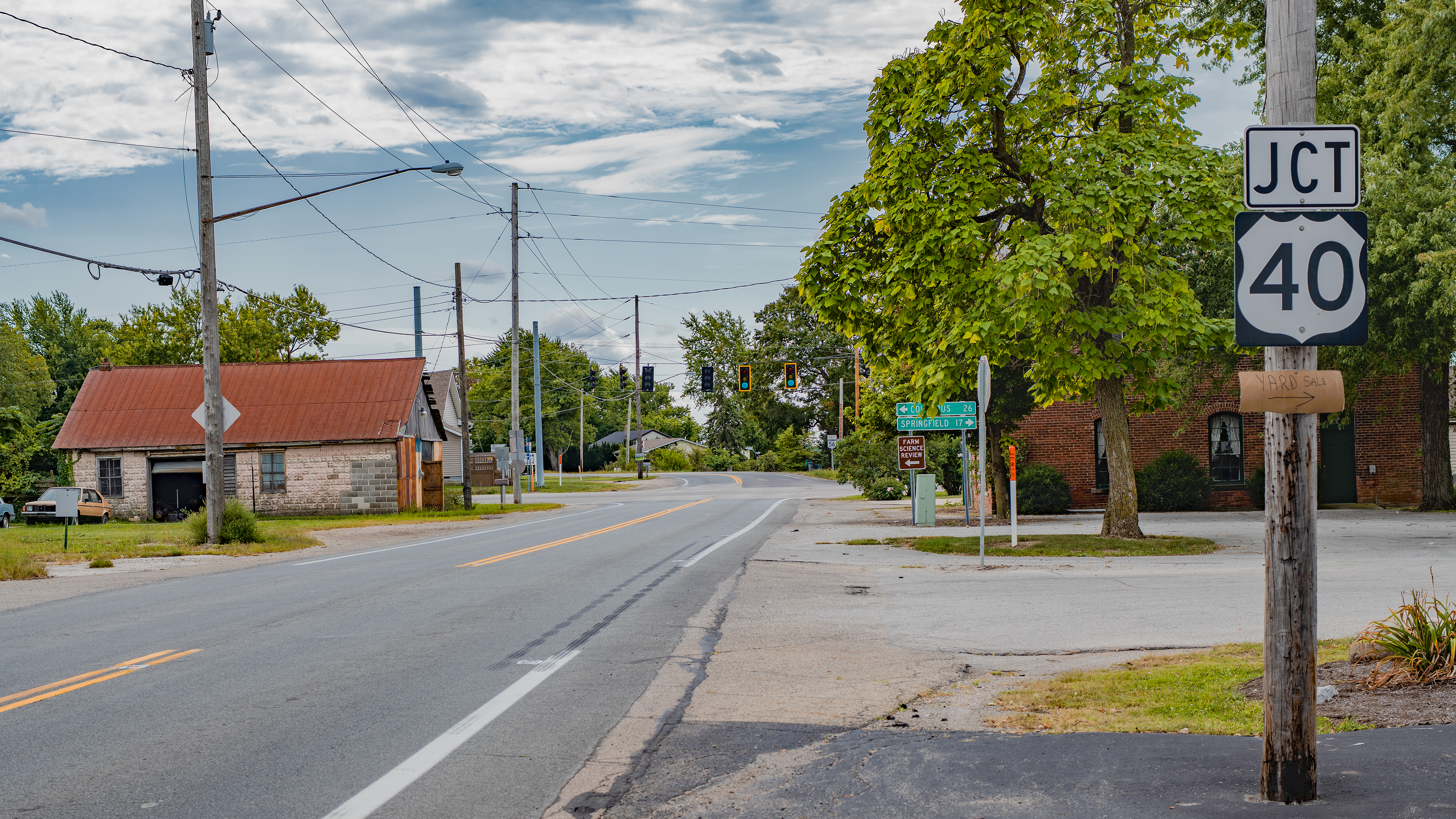
- Summerford in 2019

- Location within Ohio Location within the United States
- Coordinates: 39°56′00″N 83°29′30″W
- Country: United States
- State: Ohio
- Counties: Madison
- Township: Somerford
- Founder: Joseph Christian
- Elevation: 1,102 ft (336 m)
- Time zone: UTC-5 (Eastern (EST))
  - Summer (DST): UTC-4 (EDT)
- ZIP Code: 43140 (London)
- Area code: 740
- GNIS feature ID: 1061660

Summerford is an unincorporated community in Somerford Township, Madison County, Ohio, United States. It is located at the intersection of U.S. Route 40 and State Route 56.

It was named Summerford by settlers moving west that stopped there because the creek was up. They set up a settlement while waiting for the creek to drop to a safe lever and the forded the creek in the summer. Make a summer ford of the creek.

== History ==
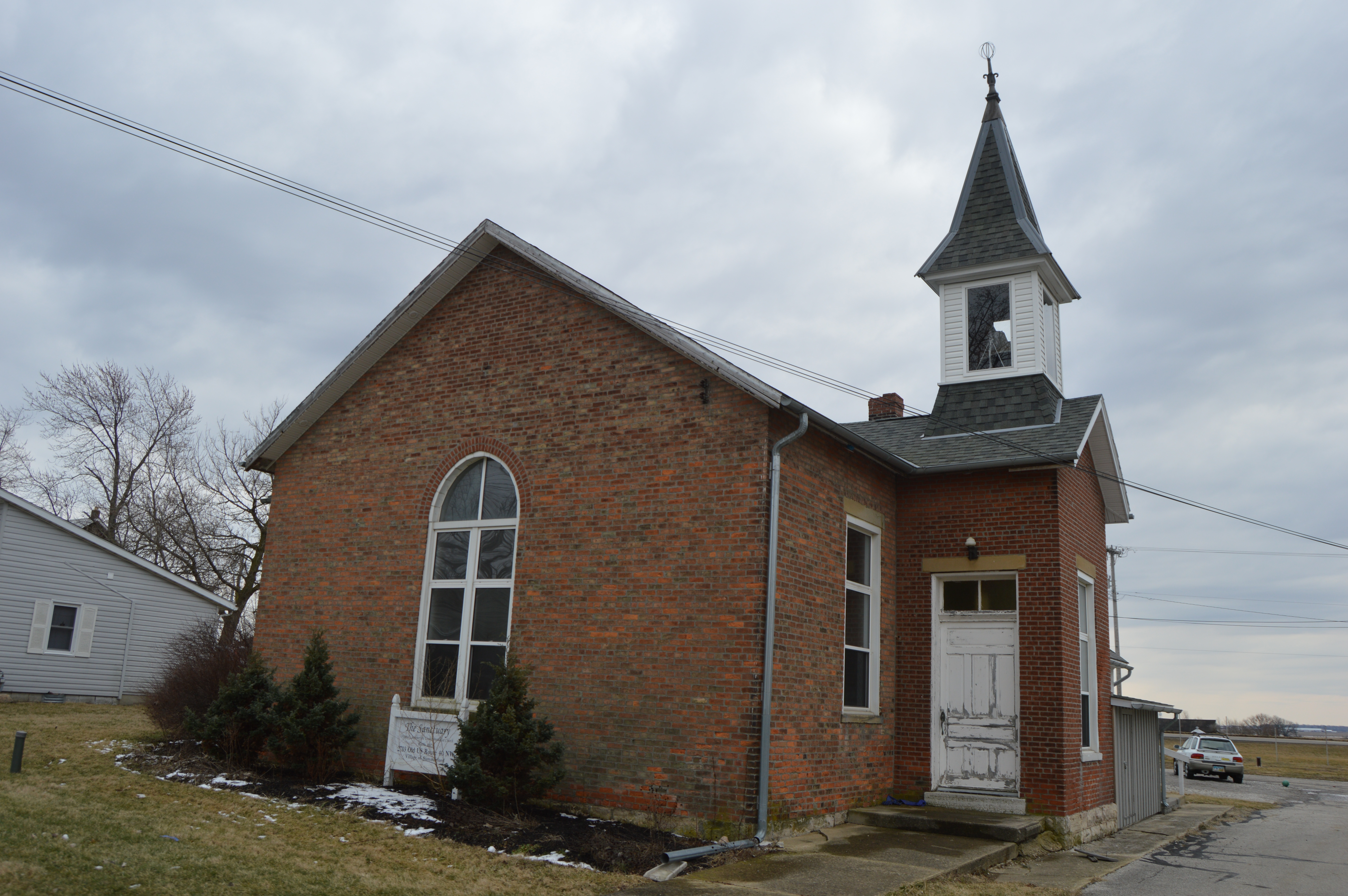
Former Methodist church

Summerford was laid out by Joseph Christian in 1833–1834, and was originally known as Somerford. The Summerford Post Office was established on June 6, 1837. As of 1875, the community contained two churches, a drug store, two grocery stores, one hotel, and two blacksmith shops, and the population was about 20. The post office was discontinued on December 15, 1905. The mail service is now sent through the London branch.
