= Richards-Sewall House =

Historic house in Ohio, United States

- U.S. National Register of Historic Places
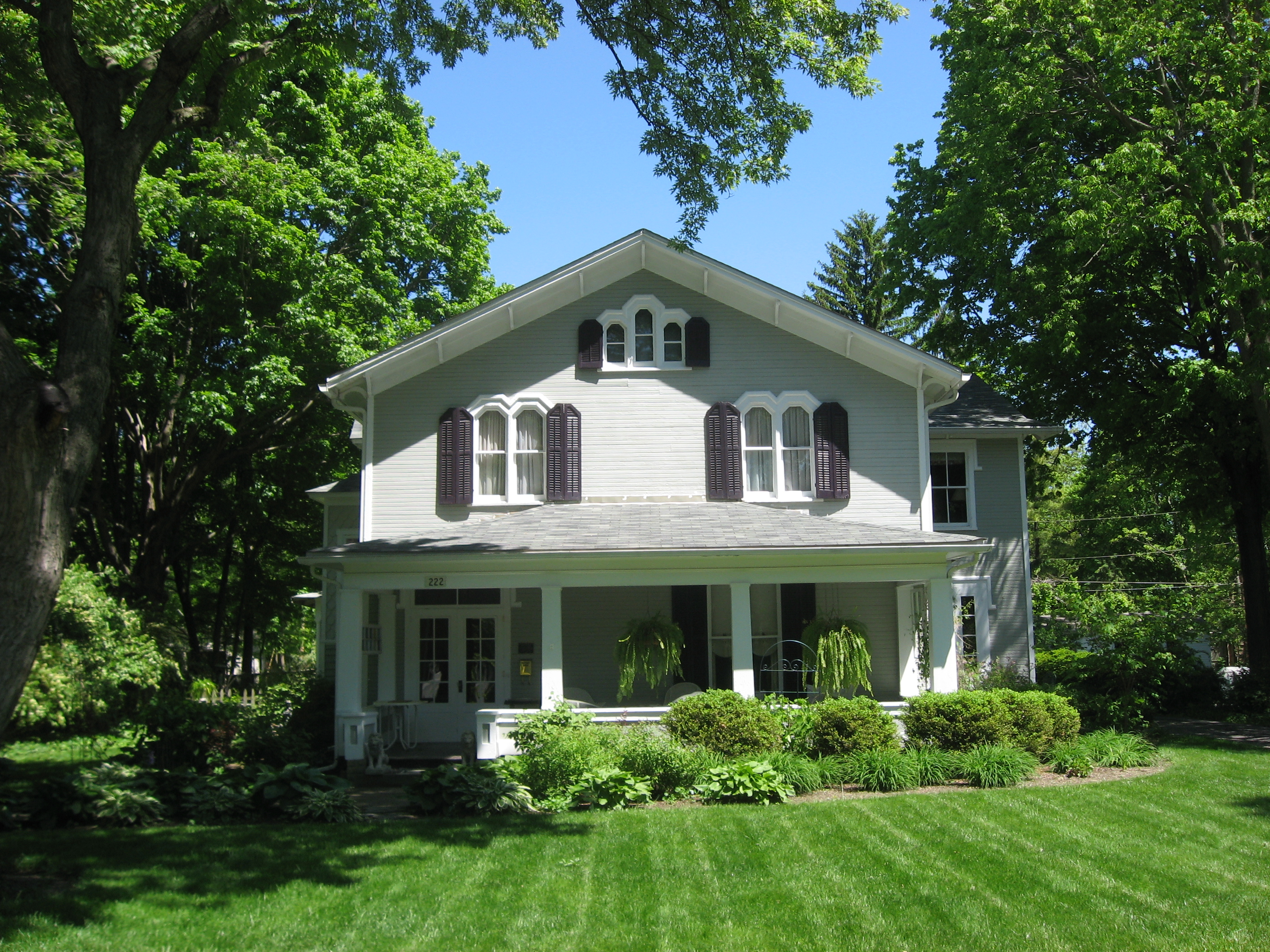
- Front of the house

- Location within Ohio Location within the United States
- Location: 222 College St., Urbana, Ohio
- Coordinates: 40°6′14″N 83°45′20″W
- Area: less than one acre
- Built: 1853
- Architect: Richards Amos
- Architectural style: Queen Anne, Stick/Eastlake, Gothic Revival
- NRHP reference No.: 95000937
- Added to NRHP: August 14, 1995

The Richards-Sewall House is a historic house in Urbana, Ohio, United States. Located along College Street on the city's western side, it was built in 1853 in a combination of the Queen Anne, Stick/Eastlake, and Gothic Revival architectural styles. Although it was built as and is currently used as a single residence, the house has also been used as a dormitory. Its most significant resident was Frank Sewall, president of what is now Urbana University during the 1870s. A native of Maine, Sewall was a minister of the New Church who moved to Urbana upon being elected to the presidency in 1870. In addition to his position as college president, Sewall taught a range of courses at the college and served as the pastor of the New Church congregation in Urbana. While living in Urbana, Sewall served as president of the church's Ohio governing body, published multiple books, and chaired the church's board of missions.

In 1995, the Richards-Sewall House was listed on the National Register of Historic Places. It qualified for addition to the Register both because of its connection to Sewall and its contribution to broad patterns of American history.
