= Dr. Adam Mosgrove House =

Historic house in Ohio, United States

- U.S. National Register of Historic Places
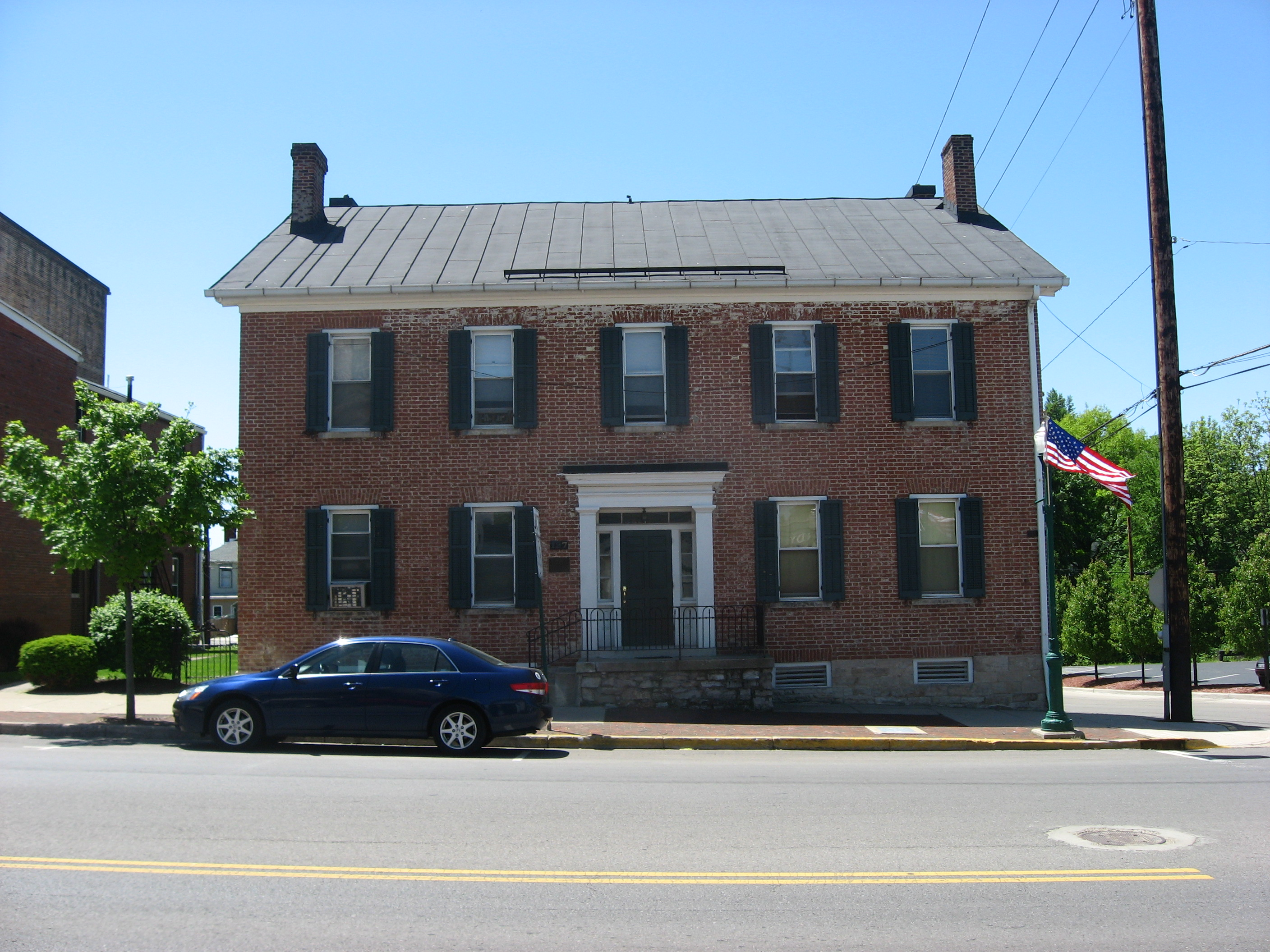
- Front of the house

- Location within Ohio Location within the United States
- Location: 127 Miami St., Urbana, Ohio
- Coordinates: 40°6′29″N 83°45′14″W
- Area: less than one acre
- Built: 1833
- Architectural style: Federal, Greek Revival
- NRHP reference No.: 82003550
- Added to NRHP: July 15, 1982

The Dr. Adam Mosgrove House is a historic house in Urbana, Ohio, United States. Located along Miami Street (U.S. Route 36) on the city's western side, it was built in 1833 as the home of physician Adam Mosgrove, one of Urbana's first doctors. A native of Enniskillen in Ireland, Mosgrove immigrated to the United States in 1816; he moved to Urbana after living in Elizabethtown and Lancaster, Ohio.

A two-and-one-half-story structure, the brick house is a simple rectangle built upon a stone foundation. Its style is predominantly Federal, although the entrance is strongly Greek Revival, featuring pilasters topped with Doric capitals. As one of Urbana's oldest houses, and as the home of one of its leading early citizens, the Mosgrove House has been seen as historically significant; for this reason, it was listed on the National Register of Historic Places in 1982.
