= Mechanicsburg United Methodist Church =

Historic church in Ohio, United States

- United Methodist Church
- U.S. National Register of Historic Places
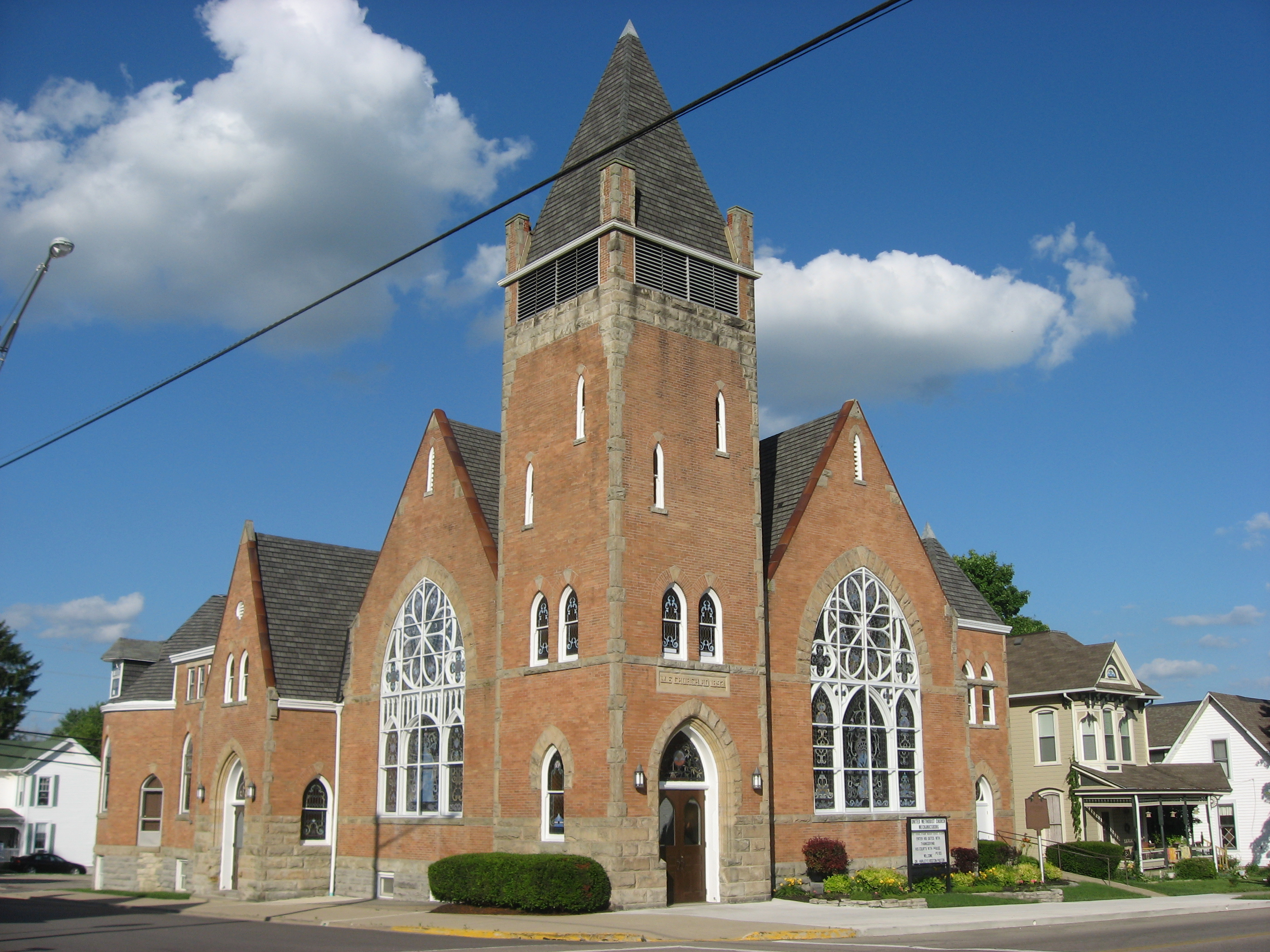
- Front and northern sides of the church

- Location within Ohio Location within the United States
- Location: N. Main and Race Sts., Mechanicsburg, Ohio
- Coordinates: 40°4′24″N 83°33′26″W
- Area: Less than 1 acre (0.40 ha)
- Built: 1893; 133 years ago
- Architectural style: Gothic Revival
- MPS: Mechanicsburg MRA
- NRHP reference No.: 85001893
- Added to NRHP: August 29, 1985

Mechanicsburg United Methodist Church is a historic Methodist congregation in the village of Mechanicsburg, Ohio, United States. Founded in the early nineteenth century, it is the oldest church in the village, and as such it has played a part in the histories of other Mechanicsburg churches. Its fifth and present church, a Gothic Revival-style structure erected in the 1890s, has been named a historic site.

== Organic history ==
The first settlers in Goshen Township arrived circa 1805, and Mechanicsburg was platted on 6 August 1814. Organized religion was rare in the earliest years; the first churches were established by circuit-riding preachers from the Methodist Episcopal Church, who founded small religious classes that met in settlers' log cabins. The Methodists formed Mechanicsburg's first church in 1814, and its members soon constructed a small log church building. In its early years, the church's membership benefited from successful camp meetings, each of which saw over a hundred people profess Christianity for the first time. The original church building was abandoned in 1819 when a much larger frame church was constructed a short distance to the east, and this building in turn was replaced in 1839 by a brick church building on the same site. This structure was abandoned after yet another one was erected in the village of Mechanicsburg in 1858.

A split weakened the Mechanicsburg church in 1853. The village had developed a reputation as a "black abolition hole" among those pursuing the many runaway slaves who passed through on the Underground Railroad, and slavery-related turmoil in the national church disturbed many of the village's Methodists. Seeing an opportunity for growth, the Ohio Conference of the Methodist Protestant Church sent a minister who gathered a number of abolitionist Methodist families into a new congregation of his denomination. By the 1880s, there were five Protestant churches in the village: the aforementioned Methodist congregations, and one each of the Baptist, the black Baptist, and the African Methodist Episcopal faiths. Prosperity continued into the twentieth century for the Methodist Episcopal Church; they chose to build yet another new house of worship in 1894, at which time they sold their previous church building to the black Second Baptist Church. Their membership was recorded at 384 in 1917. In 1939, the Methodist Protestant Church merged back into the Methodist Episcopal Church, producing The Methodist Church, and the two local congregations subsequently rejoined as well. At the merger of The Methodist Church with the Evangelical United Brethren in 1968, the denomination became known as the United Methodist Church.

== Architecture ==
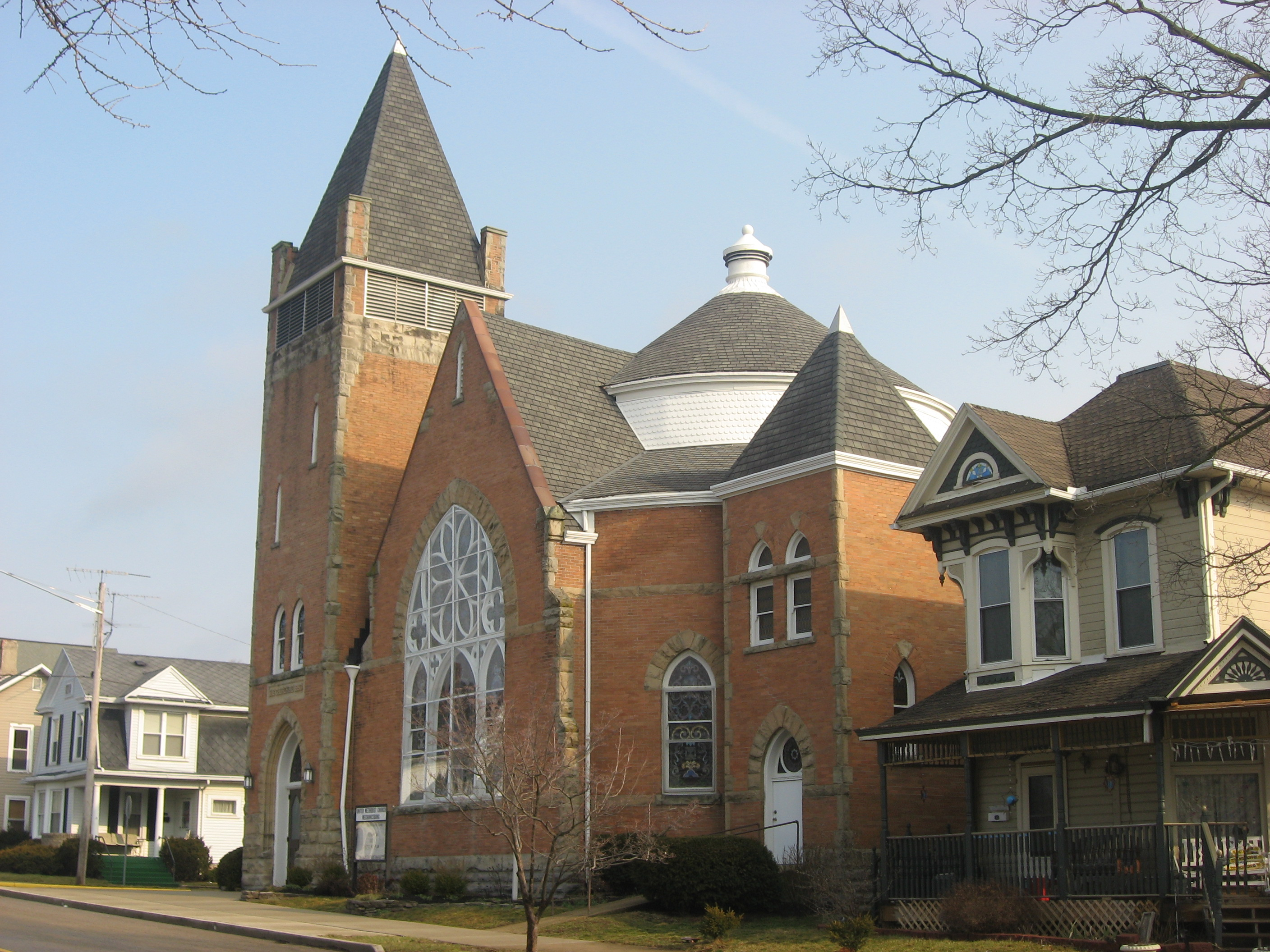
View from the south, showing the dome

The present church building is a brick Gothic Revival structure with a stone foundation. Two stories tall, it features decorative elements such as stained glass in all of the windows, stone trim around the entrance and the windows, a belfry atop a massive tower at the front, and a central dome. The sanctuary is located on the second story of the building, while the first story is divided into multiple Sunday school classrooms. Between labor, the lot, and materials, the congregation paid over $28,000 for construction. The resulting building is typical of the period; like the buildings that other Mechanicsburg churches built around the same time, it reflects the Gothic Revival style that was popular for ecclesiastical architecture during the late nineteenth century. As a result of their sizes and designs, the village's churches are the most prominent components of the built environment, and because of its location on Main Street, the Methodist Church becomes even more of a landmark than would otherwise be caused by its place as the largest of the village's churches.

== Recent history ==
Mechanicsburg United Methodist Church was listed on the National Register of Historic Places in 1985. It was part of a multiple property submission of approximately twenty buildings, scattered throughout the village in such a low concentration that a historic district designation was not practical. While many of the other twenty Mechanicsburg buildings were houses, four were the village's other historic churches: the Mechanicsburg Baptist Church (formerly Methodist Protestant), St. Michael's Catholic Church, the Church of Our Saviour (Episcopalian), and Second Baptist Church. Like all four of the others, the United Methodist Church qualified for inclusion on the Register because of its historically significant architecture. Its historic status was further recognized in 2006, when the Ohio Historical Society placed a historical marker for the church along Main Street.

In 2013, Mechanicsburg United Methodist Church was a component of the Miami Valley District in the West Ohio Annual Conference of the United Methodist Church. In contrast to the hundreds of members in past generations, its average worship attendance by that time was just ninety-six.
