= Somerford Township, Madison County, Ohio =

Township in Ohio, US

- Township
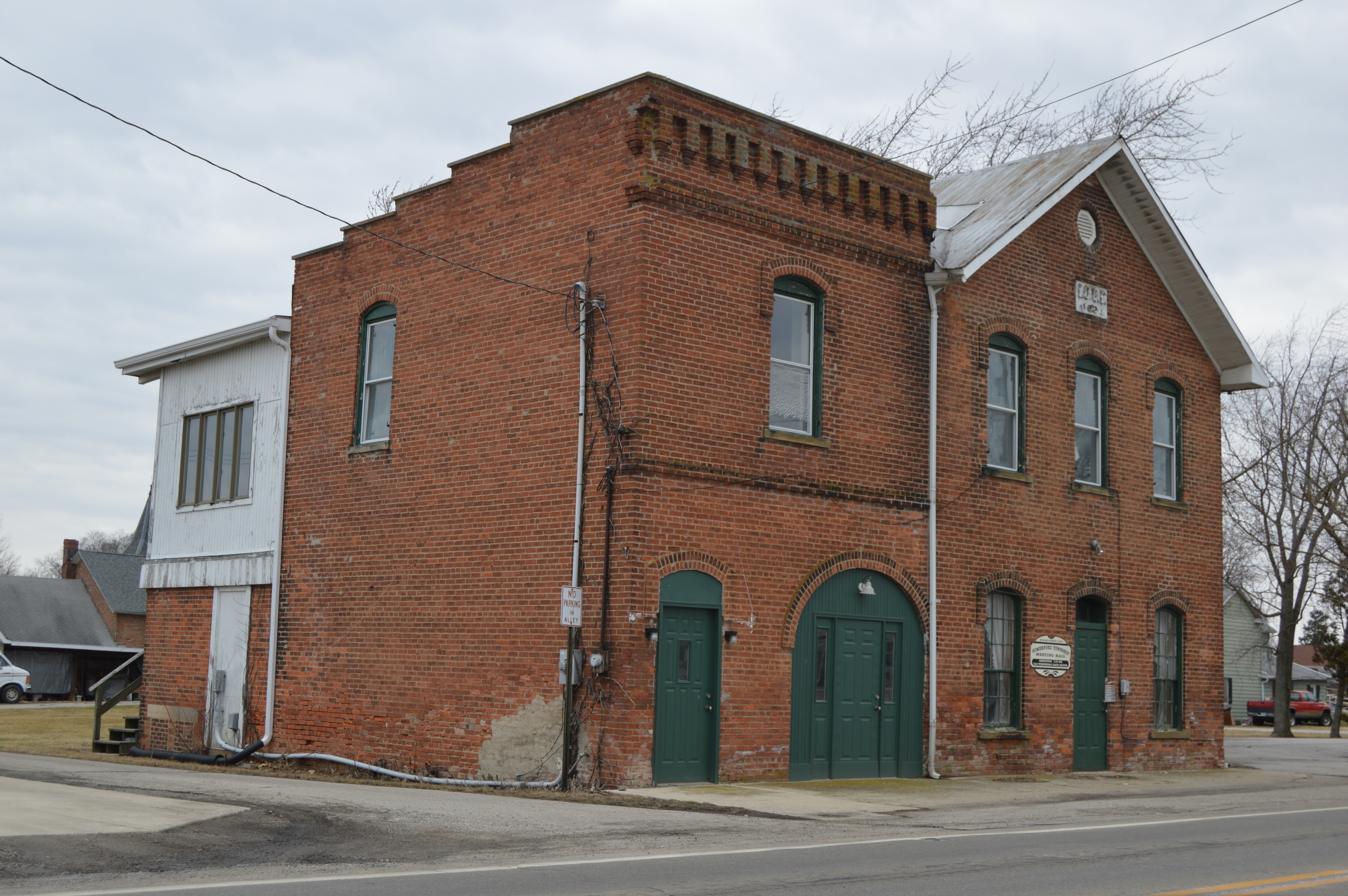
- Township hall at Summerford

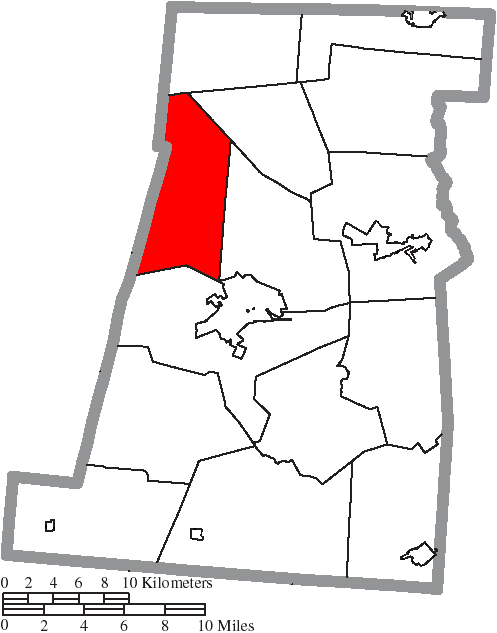
- Location of Somerford Township in Madison County
- Coordinates: 39°57′59″N 83°29′34″W
- Country: United States
- State: Ohio
- County: Madison

Area
  - Total: 29.8 sq mi (77.3 km^{2})
  - Land: 29.4 sq mi (76.1 km^{2})
  - Water: 0.46 sq mi (1.2 km^{2})
- Elevation: 1,096 ft (334 m)

Population (2020)
  - Total: 3,053
  - Density: 104/sq mi (40.1/km^{2})
- Time zone: UTC-5 (Eastern (EST))
  - Summer (DST): UTC-4 (EDT)
- FIPS code: 39-72960
- GNIS feature ID: 1086552

Somerford Township is one of the fourteen townships of Madison County, Ohio, United States. The 2020 census found 3,035 people in the township.

== Geography ==
Located in the western part of the county, it borders the following townships:

- Pike Township - north
- Monroe Township - northeast
- Deer Creek Township - east
- Union Township - south
- Harmony Township, Clark County - southwest
- Pleasant Township, Clark County - west
- Goshen Township, Champaign County - northwest

No municipalities are located in Somerford Township, although the census-designated place of Choctaw Lake and the unincorporated community of Summerford lie in the township's south.

== Name and history ==
It is the only Somerford Township statewide.

== Government ==
The township is governed by a three-member board of trustees, who are elected in November of odd-numbered years to a four-year term beginning on the following January 1. Two are elected in the year after the presidential election and one is elected in the year before it. There is also an elected township fiscal officer, who serves a four-year term beginning on April 1 of the year after the election, which is held in November of the year before the presidential election. Vacancies in the fiscal officership or on the board of trustees are filled by the remaining trustees.
