= Goshen Township, Champaign County, Ohio =

Township in Ohio, US

- Township
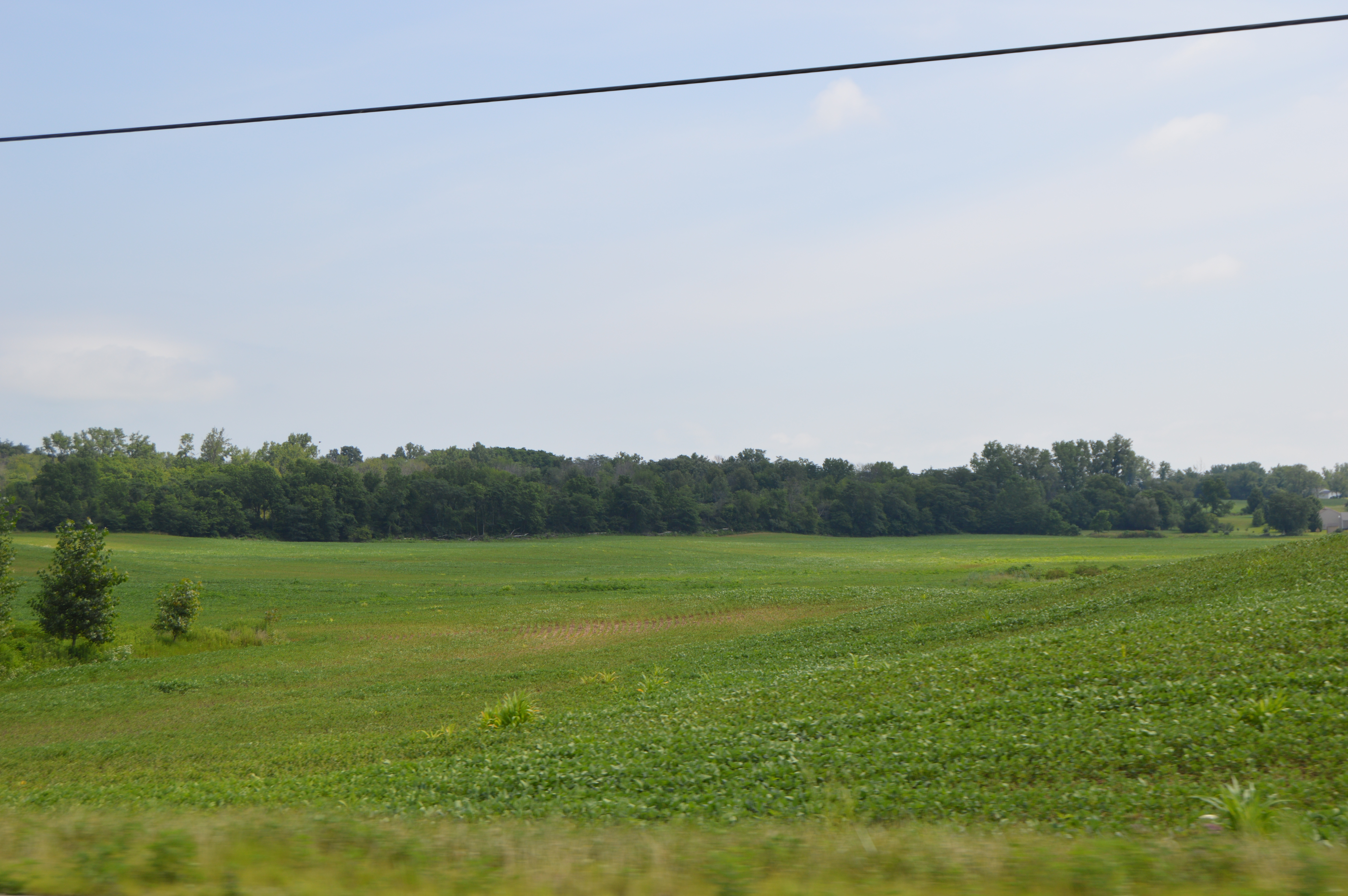
- Countryside southwest of Mechanicsburg

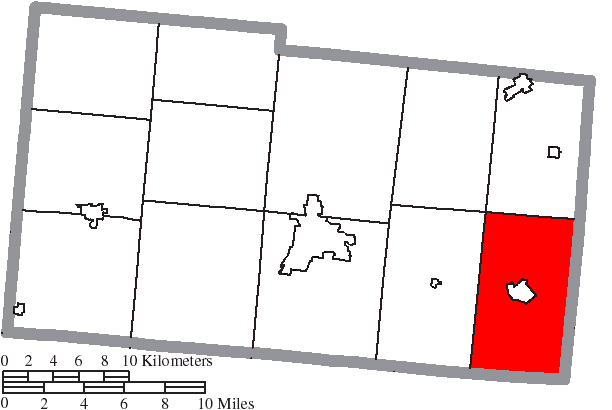
- Location of Goshen Township in Champaign County
- Coordinates: 40°4′28″N 83°33′28″W
- Country: United States
- State: Ohio
- County: Champaign

Area
  - Total: 37.64 sq mi (97.48 km^{2})
  - Land: 37.61 sq mi (97.42 km^{2})
  - Water: 0.019 sq mi (0.05 km^{2})
- Elevation: 1,080 ft (330 m)

Population (2020)
  - Total: 3,633
  - Density: 96.59/sq mi (37.29/km^{2})
- Time zone: UTC-5 (Eastern (EST))
  - Summer (DST): UTC-4 (EDT)
- FIPS code: 39-30982
- GNIS feature ID: 1085840

Goshen Township is one of the twelve townships of Champaign County, Ohio, United States. The 2020 census reported 3,633 people living in the township.

== Geography ==
Located in the southeastern corner of the county, it borders the following townships:

- Rush Township - north
- Union Township, Union County - northeast
- Pike Township, Madison County - east
- Somerford Township, Madison County - southeast
- Pleasant Township, Clark County - south
- Union Township - west
- Wayne Township - northwest corner

The village of Mechanicsburg is located in the center of the township.

== Name and history ==
It is one of seven Goshen Townships statewide.

Goshen Township was established about 1815 from land given by Union Township.

== Government ==
The township is governed by a three-member board of trustees, who are elected in November of odd-numbered years to a four-year term beginning on the following January 1. Two are elected in the year after the presidential election and one is elected in the year before it. There is also an elected township fiscal officer, who serves a four-year term beginning on April 1 of the year after the election, which is held in November of the year before the presidential election. Vacancies in the fiscal officership or on the board of trustees are filled by the remaining trustees.
