= Mechanicsburg, Ohio =

- Village
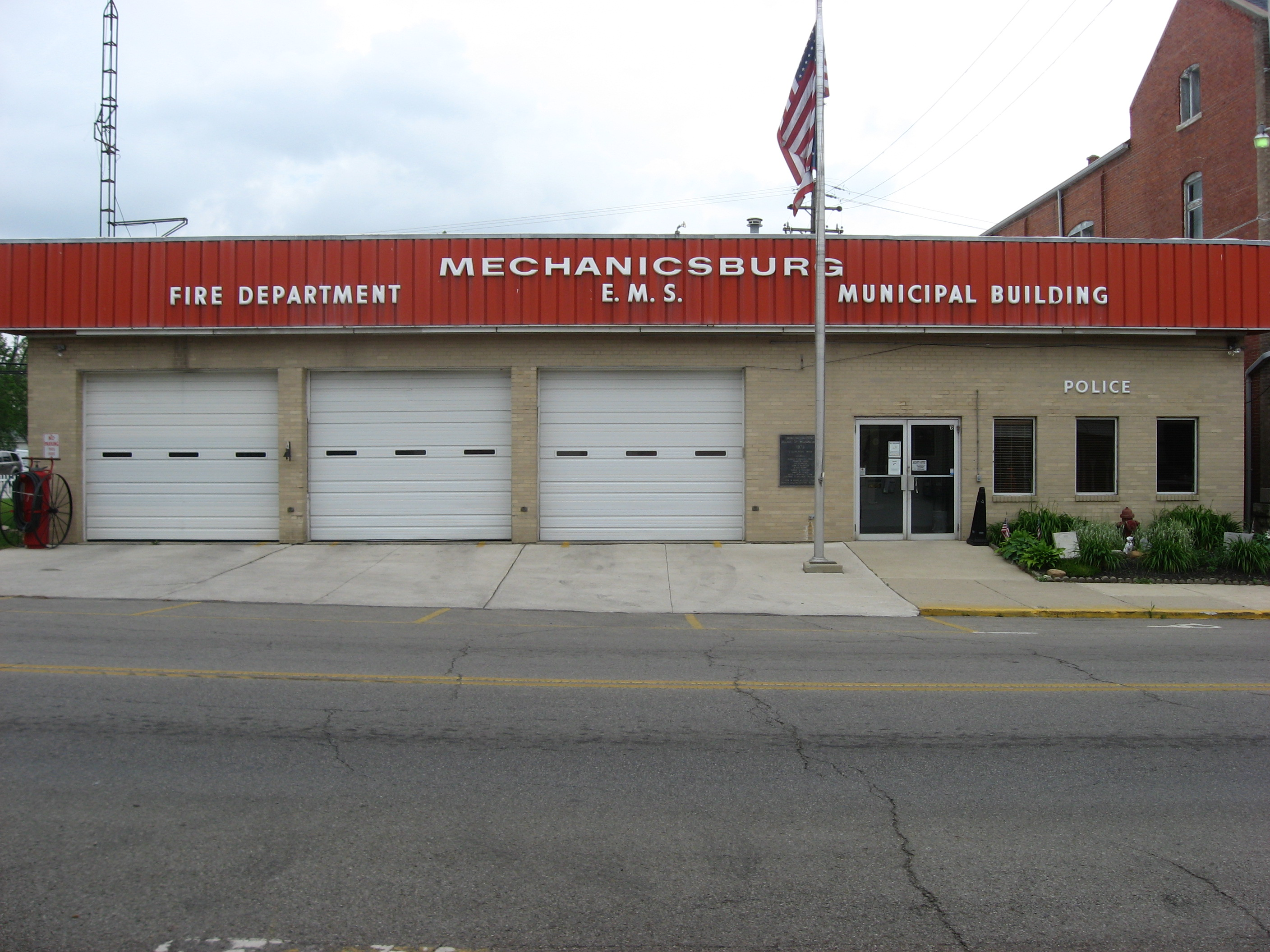
- Village hall
- Motto: "Where Unity Means Progress"
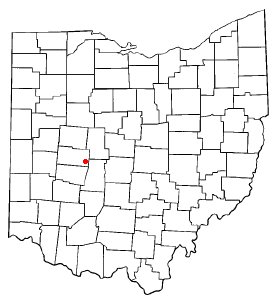
- Location of Mechanicsburg, Ohio

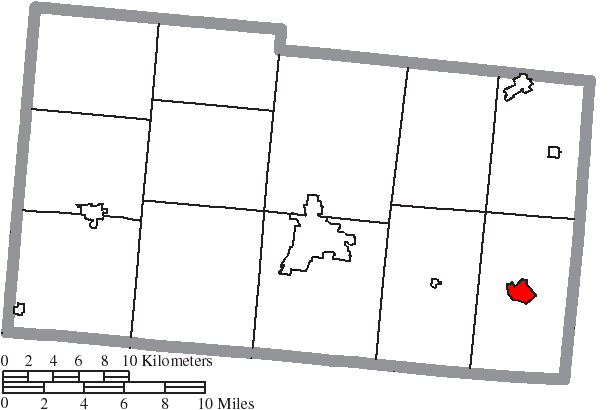
- Location of Mechanicsburg in Champaign County
- Coordinates: 40°04′24″N 83°33′23″W
- Country: United States
- State: Ohio
- County: Champaign
- Township: Goshen
- Established: 1814

Government
  - Type: Mayor - Council
  - Mayor: Jason Adelsberger

Area
  - Total: 0.98 sq mi (2.55 km^{2})
  - Land: 0.98 sq mi (2.54 km^{2})
  - Water: 0.0039 sq mi (0.01 km^{2})
- Elevation: 1,086 ft (331 m)

Population (2020)
  - Total: 1,681
  - Density: 1,713/sq mi (661.5/km^{2})
- Time zone: UTC-5 (Eastern (EST))
  - Summer (DST): UTC-4 (EDT)
- ZIP code: 43044
- Area codes: 937, 326
- FIPS code: 39-48706
- GNIS feature ID: 2399301
- Website: www.mechanicsburgvillage.com

Mechanicsburg is a village in Champaign County, Ohio, United States. The population was 1,681 at the 2020 census.

== History ==
Mechanicsburg was platted in 1814. The village was so named for the fact a large share of its settlers worked as mechanics. By 1833, Mechanicsburg's industries included two stores, a gristmill and a saw mill. Mechanicsburg was incorporated as a village in 1834.

During the antebellum years, because of its location on a tributary of the Ohio River, Mechanicsburg was used as a station on the Underground Railroad. The "conductor" Udney Hyde (1808-1887) is credited with helping more than 500 fugitive slaves on their way to freedom.

The Fugitive Slave Laws in 1793 and 1850 enabled federal marshals to track down and capture freemen who escaped from slavery. An escaped slave from Kentucky named Addison White came to Mechanicsburg and met abolitionist Udney Hyde, who housed and employed White between 1856-1857. Addison White's former owner, Daniel White, came to Mechanicsburg to capture him. Mechanicsburg residents aiding White were arrested by federal marshals, resulting in a standoff between Ohio state officials and federal marshals. The people of Mechanicsburg paid between $900-$950 for White's freedom. Addison White served in the 54th Massachusetts Infantry in the United States Civil War.

Addison White and his wife Amanda are buried at Maple Grove Cemetery in Mechanicsburg.

== Geography ==
According to the United States Census Bureau, the village has a total area of 1.02 square miles (2.64 km^{2}), of which, 1.01 square miles (2.62 km^{2}) is land and 0.01 square miles (0.03 km^{2}) is water. It is located on Little Darby Creek, a tributary of the Scioto River, and, ultimately the Ohio River. Fugitive slaves made their way cross-country when escaping from Kentucky.

== Demographics ==
Historical population
Census	Pop.	Note	%±
1850	682		—
1860	735		7.8%
1870	940		27.9%
1880	1,522		61.9%
1890	1,459		−4.1%
1900	1,617		10.8%
1910	1,446		−10.6%
1920	1,470		1.7%
1930	1,424		−3.1%
1940	1,653		16.1%
1950	1,920		16.2%
1960	1,810		−5.7%
1970	1,686		−6.9%
1980	1,792		6.3%
1990	1,803		0.6%
2000	1,744		−3.3%
2010	1,644		−5.7%
2020	1,681		2.3%
U.S. Decennial Census

=== 2010 census ===
As of the census of 2010, there were 1,644 people, 598 households, and 403 families living in the village. The population density was 1,627.7 inhabitants per square mile (628.5/km^{2}). There were 671 housing units at an average density of 664.4 per square mile (256.5/km^{2}). The racial makeup of the village was 95.4% White, 1.6% African American, 0.5% Native American, 0.1% Asian, 0.3% from other races, and 2.1% from two or more races. Hispanic or Latino of any race were 1.0% of the population.

There were 598 households, of which 34.8% had children under the age of 18 living with them, 47.2% were married couples living together, 15.1% had a female householder with no husband present, 5.2% had a male householder with no wife present, and 32.6% were non-families. 27.9% of all households were made up of individuals, and 11.8% had someone living alone who was 65 years of age or older. The average household size was 2.49 and the average family size was 3.02.

The median age in the village was 35.5 years. 24.5% of residents were under the age of 18; 10.5% were between the ages of 18 and 24; 29.2% were from 25 to 44; 22.7% were from 45 to 64; and 13.2% were 65 years of age or older. The gender makeup of the village was 52.3% male and 47.7% female.

=== 2000 census ===
As of the census of 2000, there were 1,744 people, 705 households, and 473 families living in the village. The population density was 1,699.4 inhabitants per square mile (656.1/km^{2}). There were 761 housing units at an average density of 741.6 per square mile (286.3/km^{2}). The racial makeup of the village was 97.59% White, 0.92% African American, 0.40% Native American, 0.29% from other races, and 0.80% from two or more races. Hispanic or Latino of any race were 0.63% of the population.

There were 705 households, out of which 34.9% had children under the age of 18 living with them, 47.4% were married couples living together, 14.6% had a female householder with no husband present, and 32.9% were non-families. 28.7% of all households were made up of individuals, and 12.9% had someone living alone who was 65 years of age or older. The average household size was 2.47 and the average family size was 3.03.

In the village, the population was spread out, with 28.7% under the age of 18, 8.2% from 18 to 24, 31.0% from 25 to 44, 19.4% from 45 to 64, and 12.7% who were 65 years of age or older. The median age was 34 years. For every 100 females, there were 93.8 males. For every 100 females age 18 and over, there were 88.6 males.

The median income for a household in the village was $33,385, and the median income for a family was $42,368. Males had a median income of $34,375 versus $24,453 for females. The per capita income for the village was $16,685. About 10.3% of families and 14.9% of the population were below the poverty line, including 19.2% of those under age 18 and 14.2% of those age 65 or over.

== Public services ==
=== Public safety ===
The public is served by Mechanicsburg Police Department and the Mechanicsburg Division of Fire and EMS. The police department is a full-time department. The fire department is a combination of career, part-time paid employees and volunteers.

=== Education ===
Local children attend the schools of the Mechanicsburg Exempted Village School District. The area is served by the Mechanicsburg Public Library.

== Notable people ==
- Sue Ernest Hewling, orchestra leader and professional whistler
- John Foley Horr, Civil War Officer, Collector of Customs, Federal Marshal
- David Martin Chief Justice of the Kansas Supreme Court
- William B. Saxbe, United States senator and Attorney General

== See also ==
- Mechanicsburg United Methodist Church
