= Clark House =

Clark House or Clark Farm or Clark Mansion or variations may refer to:

== New Zealand ==
- Clark House (New Zealand), Hobsonville, Auckland, listed as a listed as a Category I building by Heritage New Zealand

== United States ==
=== Alabama ===
- Willis G. Clark House, Citronelle

=== Arizona ===
- Clark Memorial Clubhouse, Clarkdale, listed on the NRHP in Yavapai County
- Clark Mansion (Clarkdale, Arizona), in Clarkdale Historic District
- J.M. Clark House, Flagstaff, listed on the NRHP in Coconino County
- Clark House (Prescott, Arizona)

=== Arkansas ===
- Clark–King House, Mountain View
- Clark House (Malvern, Arkansas)

=== California ===
- William S. Clark House, Eureka
- Dr. George C. Clark House, Fullerton, listed on the NRHP in Orange County
- Mary Andrews Clark Memorial Home, Los Angeles
- Clark House (Pasadena, California), a residence designed by Richard Neutra, built in 1957

=== Connecticut ===
- Capt. John Clark House, Canterbury
- Clark Farm Tenant House site, East Granby
- Perkins–Clark House, Hartford
- Clark Homestead, Lebanon
- Andrew Clark House, Lisbon
- Avery Clark House, Southington

=== Delaware ===
- Clark–Pratt House, Kenton

=== District of Columbia ===
- Morrison and Clark Houses

=== Florida ===
- Clark–Chalker House, Middleburg

=== Idaho ===
- Clark House (Clarksville, Idaho)

=== Illinois ===
- Dr. Clark House, Sycamore, a contributing property in Sycamore Historic District

=== Indiana ===
- Wellington A. Clark House, Crown Point
- Orin Clark House, Garrett
- Julian–Clark House, Indianapolis

=== Iowa ===
- Clark House (Iowa City, Iowa)
- Gerome Clark House, Milford
- Alexander Clark House, Muscatine
- Clark–Blackwell House, Muscatine
- Clark Round Barn, Tyrone

=== Kansas ===
- Doney–Clark House, Kingman, listed on the NRHP in Kingman County
- Clark–Robidoux House, Wallace

=== Kentucky ===
- McBrayer–Clark House, Lawrenceburg, listed on the NRHP in Anderson County
- John Clark House (Lexington, Kentucky), listed on the NRHP in Fayette County
- Gov. James A. Clark Mansion, Winchester

=== Maine ===
- Edmund and Rachel Clark Homestead, China

=== Massachusetts ===
- Clark Houses, Natick
- Clark House (Newton, Massachusetts), also known as the Rev. Francis E. Clark House
- Clark–Northrup House, Sherborn
- Sanderson–Clark Farmhouse, Waltham
- Clark–Eames House, Washington

=== Michigan ===
- Clark–Stringham site, Jackson

=== Mississippi ===
- John Clark House (Clarksdale, Mississippi)
- Hughes–Clark House, Fayette
- O'Keefe–Clark Boarding House, Ocean Springs, listed on the NRHP in Jackson County
- Mollie Clark House, Pickens, listed on the NRHP in Holmes County

=== Missouri ===
- James Beauchamp Clark House, Bowling Green
- George Boardman Clark House, Cape Girardeau
- C. M. and Vina Clark House, Montrose, listed on the NRHP in Henry County

=== Montana ===
- Charles W. Clark Mansion, Butte, listed on the NRHP in Silver Bow County
- W. A. Clark Mansion, Butte
- Clark–Cardwell House, Lewistown, listed on the NRHP in Fergus County
- Jennie Clark House, Stevensville, listed on the NRHP in Ravalli County

=== Nebraska ===
- Isaac Newton Clark House, Sutton

=== New Jersey ===
- Benjamin Clark House, Deptford Township
- Seventeenth Century Clark House, Rahway
- William Clark House (Newark, New Jersey)

=== New York ===
- Clark–Keith House, Caledonia
- Clark–Lester House, Lancaster
- Clark Farm Complex, Lima
- Starr Clark Tin Shop, Mexico
- Ezra Clark House, Millerton
- Clark House (Poughkeepsie, New York)
- Clark–Dearstyne–Miller Inn, Rensselaer
- Peyton Clark Cottage, Saranac Lake or St. Armond
- Clark House (Syracuse, New York)
- Clark House (Ticonderoga, New York)
- Hulet Clark Farmstead, Westtown
- William A. Clark House, Manhattan, demolished

=== North Carolina ===
- John Hector Clark House, Clarkton

=== North Dakota ===
- Clark House (Goodrich, North Dakota)

=== Ohio ===
- Dr. John Clark House, Berea, known also as Buehl House
- Jared Clark House, Broadview Heights, listed on the NRHP in Cuyahoga County
- Dr. Clark House (Mechanicsburg, Ohio)
- Whitney Clark House, Wellington, listed on the NRHP in Lorain County
- Ansel Clark House, Wellington, listed on the NRHP in Lorain County
- Wells–Clark–Strouss House, Youngstown, listed on the NRHP in Trumbull County

=== Oklahoma ===
- Mahoney–Clark House, Lawton

=== Oregon ===
- Robert F. and Elizabeth Clark House, Baker
- Clark–McConnell House, Grants Pass, listed on the NRHP in Josephine County
- Clark–Norton House, Grants Pass, listed on the NRHP in Josephine County
- Frank Chamberlain Clark House, Medford
- Burke–Clark House, Portland
- Elizabeth Clark House, Oregon City, listed on the NRHP in Clackamas County

=== Pennsylvania ===
- Sen. Joseph O. Clark House, Glen Campbell
- Silas M. Clark House, Indiana

=== Tennessee ===
- Douglass–Clark House, Gallatin, listed on the NRHP in Sumner County
- Langston Clark Barn, Maryville, listed on the NRHP in Blount County
- Willard–Clark House, Maryville
- Weakley–Truett–Clark House, Nashville
- Henry A. Clark House, Wartrace

=== Texas ===
- Clark–Whitton House, Lufkin, listed on the NRHP in Angelina County
- Robert Clark House, Victoria, listed on the NRHP in Victoria County
- Clark House (Victoria, Texas), listed on the NRHP in Victoria County

=== Utah ===
- Anderson–Clark Farmstead, Grantsville
- Peter Clark House, Park City, listed on the NRHP in Summit County
- Clark–Taylor House, Provo
- Isaac C. and Dorothy S. Clark House, Salt Lake City, listed on the NRHP in Salt Lake County
- Jensen–Clark House, Sandy

=== Virginia ===
- Reuben Clark House

=== Washington ===
- Clark Mansion (Spokane, Washington), also known as the Patsy Clark Mansion

=== Wisconsin ===
- William Clark House (Baraboo, Wisconsin)
- Clark–Brown House, Beloit, listed on the NRHP in Rock County
- Jonathan Clark House, Mequon

== See also ==
- Clarke House (disambiguation)
- Dr. Clark House (disambiguation)
- John Clark House (disambiguation)
- William Clark House (disambiguation)
