= John Clark House =

John Clark House may refer to:

- Capt. John Clark House, Canterbury, Connecticut, listed on the National Register of Historic Places (NRHP)
- John Clark House (Lexington, Kentucky), listed on the NRHP in Fayette County, Kentucky
- John Clark House (Rockville, Minnesota), part of an NRHP listing
- John Clark House (Clarksdale, Mississippi), NRHP-listed
- John Hector Clark House, Clarkton, NC, listed on the NRHP in Bladen County, North Carolina
- Jonathan Clark House, Mequon, Wisconsin, listed on the NRHP in Ozaukee County, Wisconsin
