= Truett =

Truett may refer to:

- Truett (name)
- Truett-McConnell College, in Cleveland, Georgia
- USS Truett (FF-1095), ship
- George W. Truett Theological Seminary, Baptist theological seminary in Waco, Texas
- Alpheus Truett House, in Franklin, Tennessee
- Weakley-Truett-Clark House, in Nashville, Tennessee
