= Dr. Clark House =

Dr. Clark House may refer to:

in the United States

- Dr. John Clark House, Berea, Ohio, known also as Buehl House, listed on the National Register of Historic Places (NRHP)
- John H. Clark House, Mechanicsburg, Ohio, listed on the NRHP in Champaign County as "Dr. Clark House"
- Dr. Clark House, Sycamore, Illinois, a contributing property in Sycamore Historic District

== See also ==
- Clark House (disambiguation)
