= Lawler's Tavern =

- U.S. National Register of Historic Places
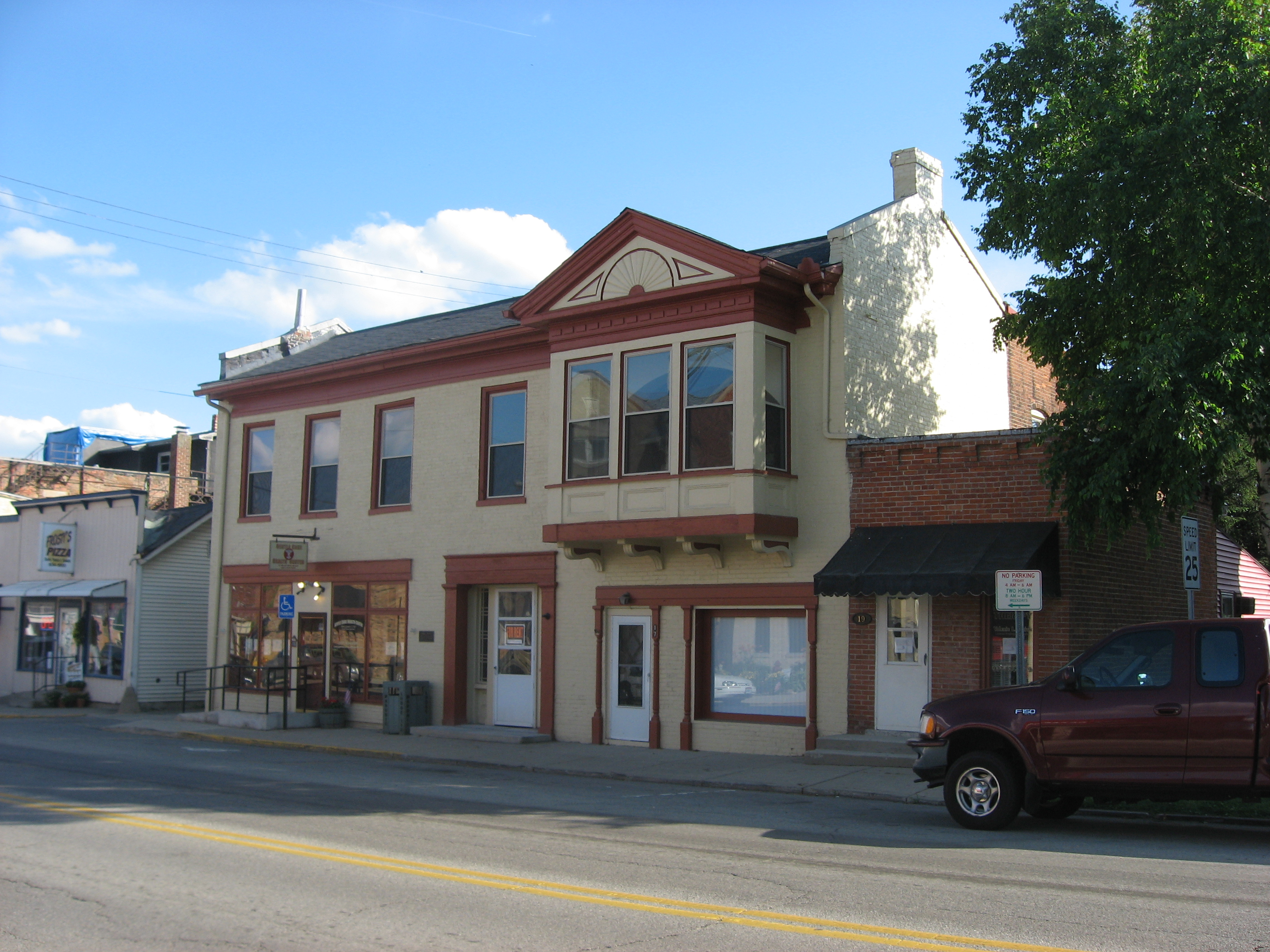
- Front and northern side of the tavern

- Location within Ohio Location within the United States
- Location: N. Main St., Mechanicsburg, Ohio
- Coordinates: 40°4′20″N 83°33′24″W
- Area: Less than 1 acre (0.40 ha)
- Built: 1830
- Architectural style: Greek Revival
- MPS: Mechanicsburg MRA
- NRHP reference No.: 85001885
- Added to NRHP: August 29, 1985

Lawler's Tavern is a historic commercial building in the village of Mechanicsburg, Ohio, United States. Built in 1830, it is one of the oldest buildings in the community, and it has been named a historic site.

== History ==
Mechanicsburg was platted on 1814 in the wake of increasing settlement, despite the ongoing war. In its early years, the village grew slowly; the 1830 census found just 99 residents. Mechanicsburg's first two buildings were log structures used for commercial purposes: a small store and the village's first tavern respectively, they were both constructed on what is now the southern corner of Sandusky and Main Streets on the public square.

Dr. E.D. Lawler was one of six physicians practicing in Mechanicsburg during the village's earliest years. In 1839, the Champaign County Commissioners began listing the tax-paying physicians of the county in their records, and Lawler was one of thirteen doctors recorded in the county in that year. Virtually nothing is known about any of them except for their profession, although Lawler was the only one of the six early doctors to appear in the 1839 list. However, Lawler is known to have constructed the tavern in 1830; he lived and operated his practice out of the first floor, while the second floor was rented to travellers. In 1840, the tavern was surrounded by Lawler's orchard to the north, a long, low commercial building known as the "Long Ornery" to the south, and an even older pharmacy on the opposite side of the street. All of its original neighbors have been destroyed; Lawler's is the sole commercial building remaining from the village's earliest years. Even after Dr. Lawler's time, the building remained in use as a medical office; Dr. John H. Clark, who practiced in the late nineteenth century, and who lived next door, used an office in the tavern for a substantial portion of his career.

Throughout the tavern's history of more than 180 years, it has seen multiple modifications. Among them was the construction of space for Dr. Clark's office, which was housed in an addition rather than in the original building. Additionally, the tavern's prominent overhang with its large window, ornamented gable, and brackets was constructed at the end of the nineteenth century.

== Architecture ==
Lawler's Tavern is a brick building with a stone foundation. Many of its more prominent architectural elements combine to make it a typical example of vernacular interpretations of the Greek Revival style of architecture, which never became popular in the area. Besides the facade's overall symmetrical design with multi-paned windows, the building derives its Greek Revival appearance most clearly from the central entryway: surrounded by a transom and sidelights, the doorway is framed by pilasters on both sides. Inside, some original components remain, including the stairway and woodwork in the front hallway.

== Preservation ==
As the only commercial building surviving from Mechanicsburg's earliest years, Lawler's Tavern is a core component of the village's historic built environment; along with the former Second Baptist Church, it is one of just two Greek Revival buildings near the center of the village. Spatially, it occupies a transitional place between the commercial and residential neighborhoods of Main Street; the commercial district extends southward, while the next building to the north is the beginning of the village's upscale residential neighborhood.

In 1985, Lawler's was listed on the National Register of Historic Places, qualifying because of its historic architecture. It was part of a multiple property submission of approximately twenty buildings, scattered throughout the village in such a low concentration that a historic district designation was not practical. Several other buildings included in the group were houses and commercial buildings on North Main, such as the adjacent John H. Clark House, the Oram Nincehelser House and the Masonic Temple across the street, the United Methodist Church at the intersection with Race Street, and the Village Hobby Shop a short distance to the south.
