= Jeff Kimball House =

Historic house in Ohio, United States

- Kimball House
- U.S. National Register of Historic Places
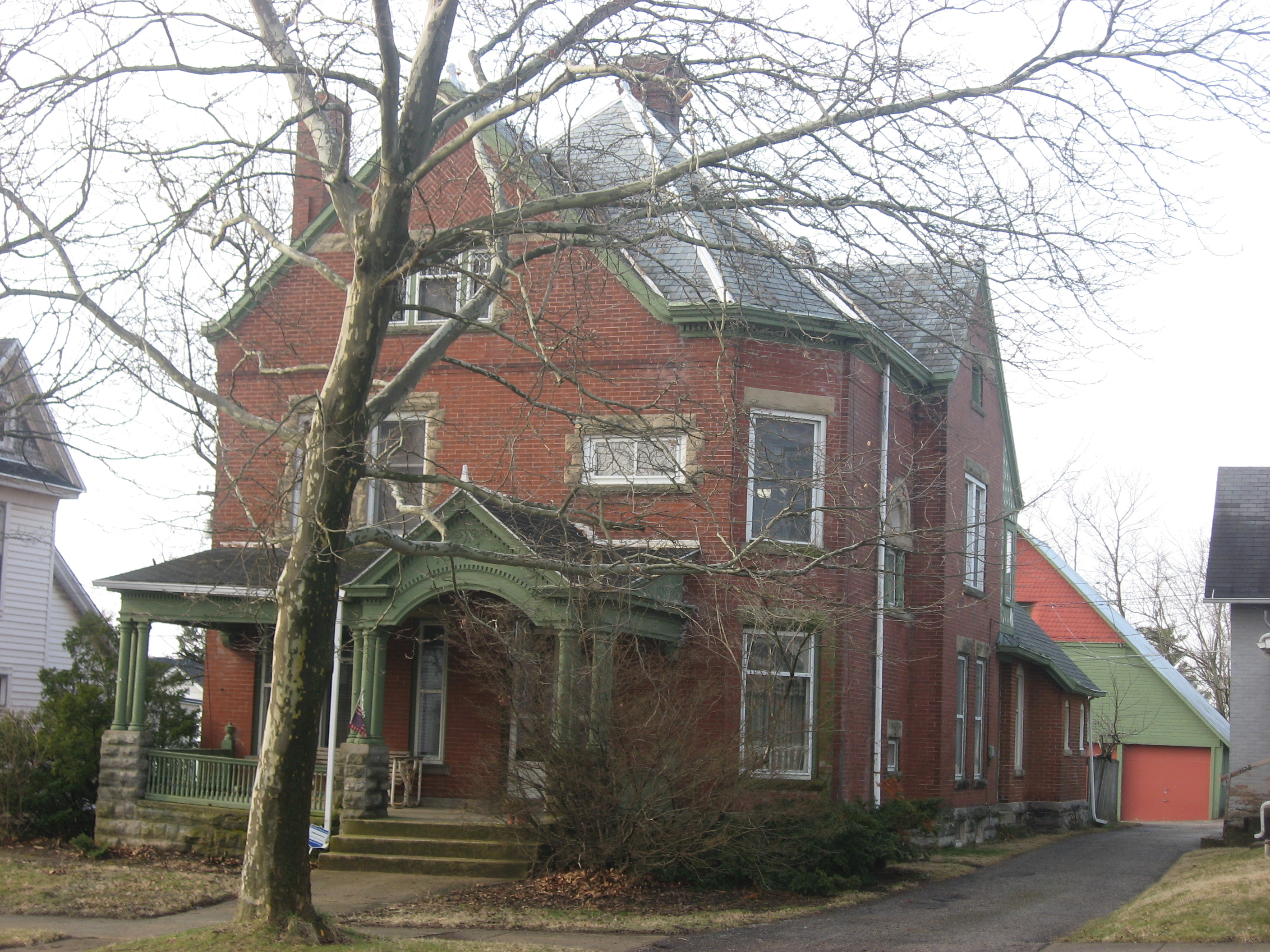
- Front and northern side of the house

- Location within Ohio Location within the United States
- Location: 115 N. Main Street, Mechanicsburg, Ohio
- Coordinates: 40°4′25″N 83°33′29″W
- Area: Less than 1 acre (0.40 ha)
- Built: 1897
- Architectural style: Queen Anne
- MPS: Mechanicsburg MRA
- NRHP reference No.: 85001884
- Added to NRHP: August 29, 1985

The Jeff Kimball House is a historic residence in the village of Mechanicsburg, Ohio, United States. Once home to one of the village's leading residents, it has been named a historic site.

== History ==
Jeff Kimball began construction on his residence in 1895 and completed two years later. He and his family lived there for almost fifty years before selling it in 1943. During the late nineteenth century, multiple prosperous farmers owning land near Mechanicsburg constructed or purchased houses along Main Street north of downtown, instead of living on their farms; some of the more prominent ones were Jeff Kimball, Henry Burnham, and Neil Gest, whose homes are today known as the Jeff Kimball, Henry Burnham, and Demand-Gest Houses. In later years, the house was the home of a family named Doerman.

== Architecture ==
One of Mechanicsburg's better Queen Anne residences, the Jeff Kimball House is a brick building with a stone foundation, a slate roof, and additional elements of brick and stone. Although its neighborhood includes all of the village's best houses, the two-and-a-half-story Kimball House nevertheless stands out by means of details such as its ornamental front porch, its ironwork, its stained glass windows with bevelling, and the elaborate basketweave-like pattern of its brickwork.

== Preservation ==
The Jeff Kimball House was listed on the National Register of Historic Places in 1985, qualifying both because of its historic architecture and its place in Ohio's history. It was one of approximately twenty different Mechanicsburg locations to be listed on the National Register at the same time as part of a multiple property submission. Among the Kimball House's neighbors that were included in the multiple property submission are the Demand-Gest House at 37 N. Main, the Mechanicsburg United Methodist Church at Main and Race Streets, and the Oram Nincehelser House at 28 N. Main.
