= William Clark House =

William Clark House may refer to:

- William A. Clark House, Manhattan, New York City
- William S. Clark House, Eureka, California, listed on the National Register of Historic Places (NRHP)
- William Clark House (Newark, New Jersey), NRHP-listed
- William Clark House (Baraboo, Wisconsin), NRHP-listed

== See also ==
- Clark House (disambiguation)
