= Truitt =

Truitt is a surname, and may refer to:

== Arts and entertainment ==
- Anne Truitt (1921–2004), American artist
- Bess Truitt (1884–1972), Oklahoma Poet Laureate
- Daniel Truitt (born 1994), American drag queen
- Danielle Moné Truitt (born 1981), American actress
- Myles Truitt (born 2002), American actor
- Sonny Truitt, American jazz musician, worked with Miles Davis

== Politics ==
- Catherine Truitt (born 1970), American politician from North Carolina
- Dan Truitt, former Member of the Pennsylvania House of Representatives from the 156th district (2010-2016)
- George Truitt (1756–1818), American politician from Delaware; state legislator and governor of Delaware 1808–11
- Oadline Truitt (born 1940), American politician from New Jersey; state legislator 2006–08
- Randy Truitt, politician in Indiana, USA
- Vicki Truitt (born 1954), Texan politician and lobbyist
- Warren Truitt (1849–1935), American lawyer, politician, and judge

== Sports ==
- Ansley Truitt (1950–2021), American basketball player
- Dave Truitt (born 1964), American football player (tight end)
- Frank Truitt (1925–2014), American collegiate coach and World War II veteran
- Greg Truitt (born 1965), American football player for Cincinnati Bengals
- Olanda Truitt (born 1971), American football player (wide receiver)
- R. V. Truitt (1890–1991), American zoologist and lacrosse coach

== Other ==
- Anna Augusta Truitt (1837–1920), American philanthropist, temperance reformer, essayist
- James Truitt (died 1981), American journalist
- Stephen M. Truitt (contemporary), American activist lawyer; represents some of the Guantánamo prisoners
- R. V. Truitt (1890–1991), American zoologist and lacrosse coach

== See also ==
- Trewhitt
- Truett (name)
