= Trewhitt =

Trewhitt may refer to:

- Henry Trewhitt (1927–2003), American journalist
- Daniel C. Trewhitt (1823–1891), American attorney, judge and politician
- Trewhitt Junior High School, a high school in Bradley County, Tennessee

== See also ==
- Truett (name)
- Truitt
