= John H. Clark House =

Historic house in Ohio, United States

- Dr. Clark House
- U.S. National Register of Historic Places
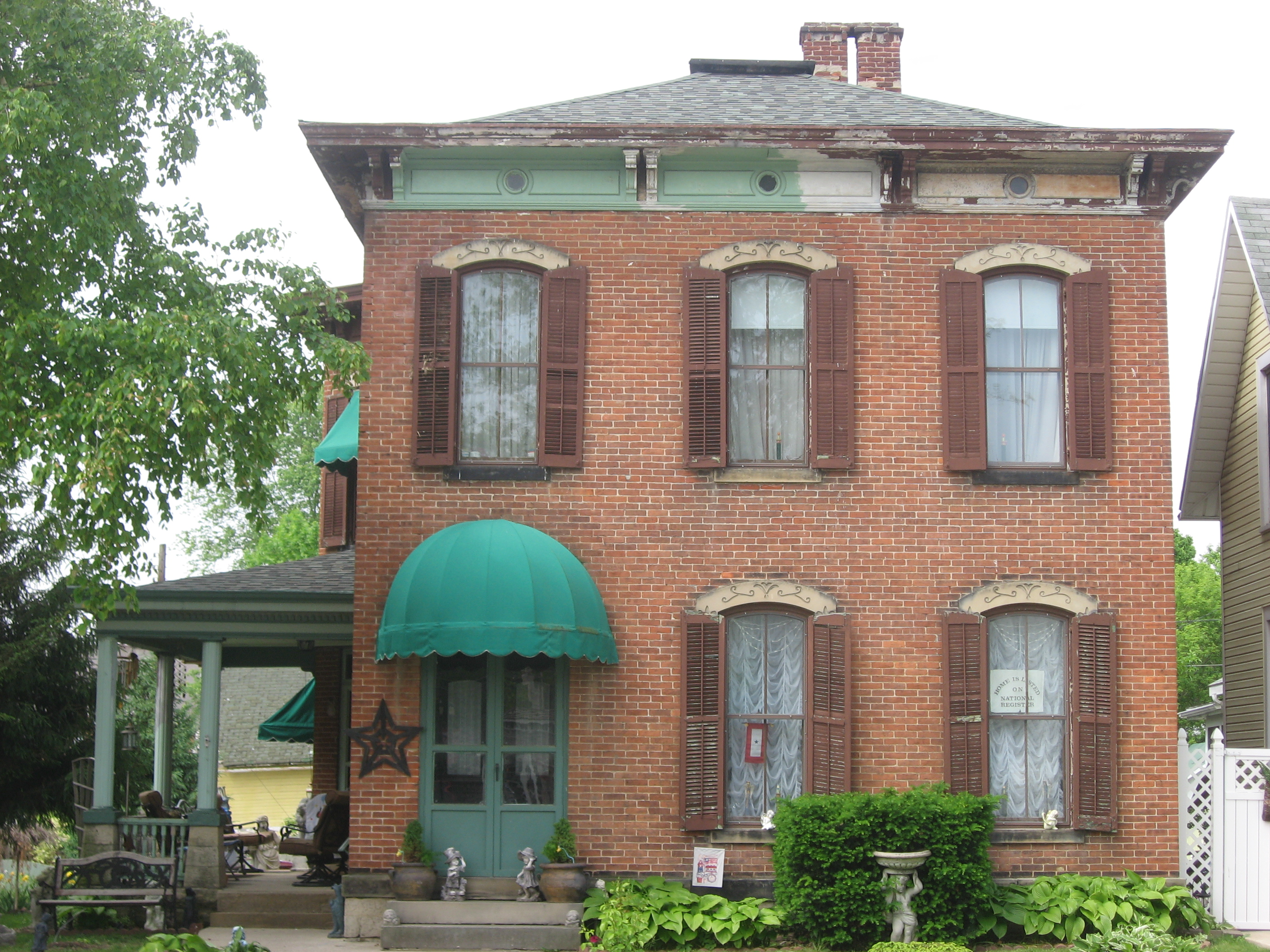
- Front of the house

- Location within Ohio Location within the United States
- Location: 21 N. Main St., Mechanicsburg, Ohio
- Coordinates: 40°4′21″N 83°33′24″W
- Area: Less than 1 acre (0.40 ha)
- Built: 1875
- Architectural style: Italianate
- MPS: Mechanicsburg MRA
- NRHP reference No.: 85001879
- Added to NRHP: August 29, 1985

The John H. Clark House is a historic residence in the village of Mechanicsburg, Ohio, United States. Built during Mechanicsburg's most prosperous period, it was the home of a prominent local doctor, and it has been named a historic site because of its historic architecture.

== Clark biography ==
John H. Clark was born in 1829 in Union Township, the scion of one of Champaign County's oldest families, and after studying at the Starling Medical College, he began practicing in the nearby village of Mutual in 1853. Although he moved to Decatur, Illinois in 1859, he returned to Champaign County two years later, and from then until his 1901 death was a prominent Mechanicsburg resident, except for his membership on the United States Sanitary Commission during part of the American Civil War and his superintendency over Ohio's insane asylum at Dayton from 1874 to 1876. While resident in Mechanicsburg, he was a member of the Champaign County and Ohio State Medical Societies, as well as the American Medical Association, and published multiple articles in medical journals. In 1852, he married the former Elenor Williams, who bore him one son; their marriage lasted until John's death in 1901. He was affiliated with the Democratic Party, Mechanicsburg's Episcopal church, and the village's Masonic lodge.

Professionally, Clark was active primarily as a physician and as a financier. In 1887, he entered into partnership with a neighbor, Dr. Oram Nincehelser, but they parted ways in 1893. For much of his career, he maintained his office in the historic Lawler's Tavern. He was also a president of the Farmers Bank of Mechanicsburg.

== House ==
Clark had his house built in 1875; the names of the builder and designer have not been preserved. Constructed in the Italianate style, it is a brick structure with a stone foundation, asphalt roof, and other elements of stone. One of Mechanicsburg's numerous historic Italianate residences from the late nineteenth century, it was built during the village's postwar boom; the population nearly doubled between the 1870 and 1890 censuses. It is a well-preserved example of the high style of the day, due to common architectural elements such as a cornice with pairs of brackets, arched windows with hood molds, and an ornamental frieze. Its floor plan takes the shape of the letter "L", although it has been modified by the addition of a side porch with miniature Ionic columns. A small wooden garage is located on the rear of the property.

The Clark House sits on the southeastern edge of the Main Street residential neighborhood; other upscale residences, such as the Demand-Gest, Jeff Kimball, and Oram Nincehelser Houses occupy nearby lots to the northwest, while immediately to the southeast can be found commercial buildings such as Lawler's Tavern and the Village Hobby Shop.

== Preservation ==
The Clark House was listed on the National Register of Historic Places in 1985. It was part of a multiple property submission of approximately twenty buildings, scattered throughout the village in such a low concentration that a historic district designation was not practical. Many of the other buildings were houses, including several other prominent residences on North Main, although the submission also included nearby commercial buildings such as Lawler's Tavern and religious structures such as the United Methodist Church on Main at Race Street. The Clark House qualified both because of its historically significant architecture and the place that it had played in Ohio's history.
