= Village Hobby Shop =

- U.S. National Register of Historic Places
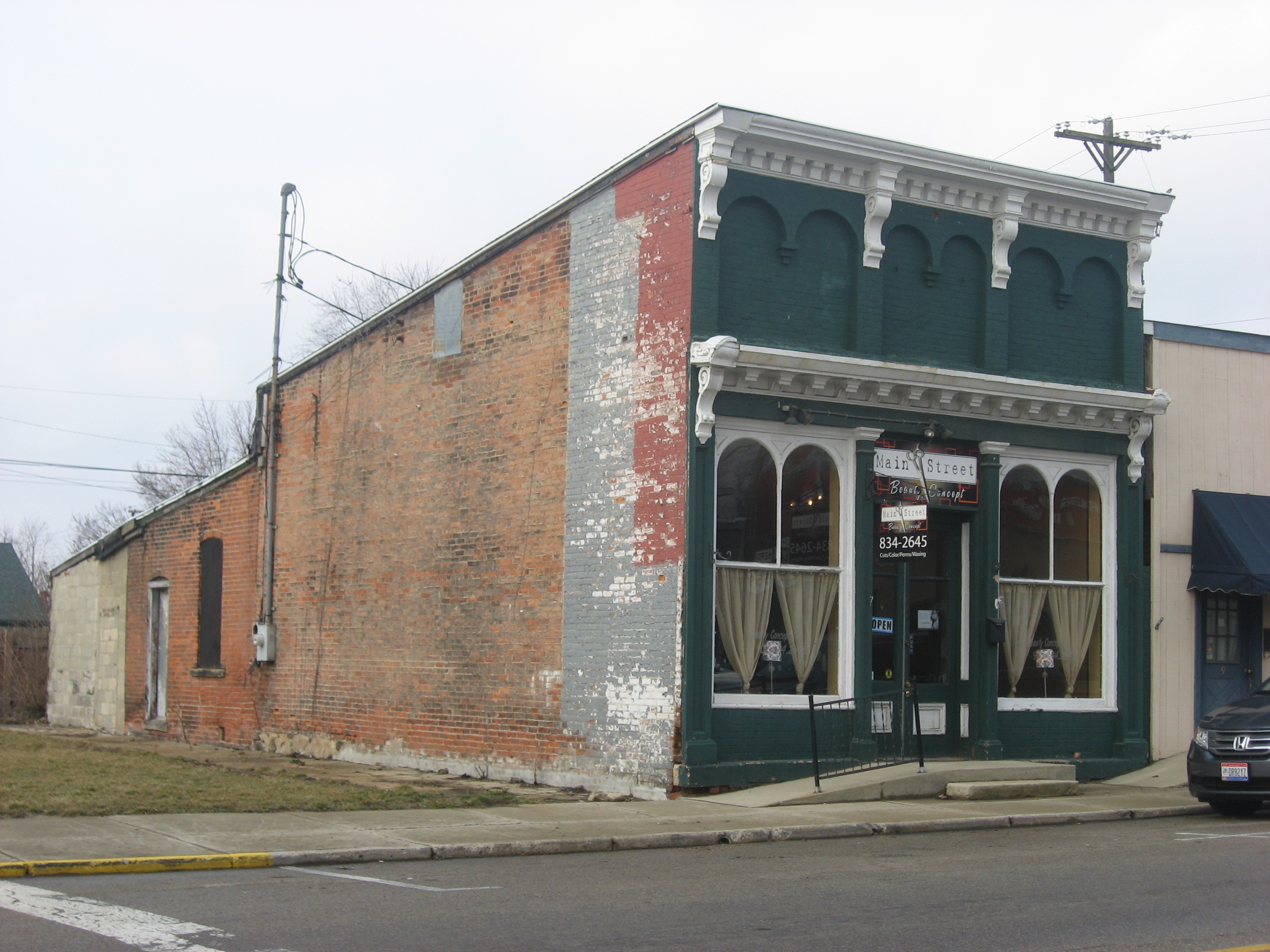
- Front and southern side

- Location within Ohio Location within the United States
- Location: N. Main St., Mechanicsburg, Ohio
- Coordinates: 40°4′19.8″N 83°33′23″W
- Area: Less than 1 acre (0.40 ha)
- Built: 1880
- Architectural style: Italianate
- MPS: Mechanicsburg MRA
- NRHP reference No.: 85001894
- Added to NRHP: August 29, 1985

The Village Hobby Shop is a historic building in the village of Mechanicsburg, Ohio, United States. Built on Main Street (now State Route 29) in the late 19th century, it is one of the village's oldest extant commercial buildings, and it has been named a historic site.

== History ==
Mechanicsburg was settled in 1814, but it initially grew slowly; the 1830 census found just 99 people in the village. Businesses were well established on Main Street downtown by 1840, but little survives of that period's commercial district, as multiple great fires afflicted the community. While some of these fires harmed the village by destroying important businesses, including a major factory on South Main, others ultimately benefited the community by destroying ramshackle buildings and forcing the construction of better structures. Following the Civil War, Mechanicsburg entered into a boom period, and the Village Hobby Shop was one of numerous commercial buildings erected during the period. Mechanicsburg had always served as the commercial center for farmers in the nearby countryside, but the boom of the late nineteenth century saw its commerce expand substantially; by 1890, one could buy drugs and jewelry downtown, as well as groceries and dry goods. The Hobby Shop building was typical of the period; built in 1880, it was home to Trader's Bank and to Schetter's Jewelry Store at different times. Starting in 1901 and continuing into the 1910s, the building was home to John Brinnon's Meat Market. By 2010, the building had become home to a beauty parlor.

== Architecture ==
The Village Hobby Shop is a thoroughly brick building; its walls, its foundation, and its decorative elements are all brick masonry. Numerous architectural elements combine to make it a clear example of the Italianate style of architecture, including the massive arches over the large display windows, a small cornice over the entrance and windows, and the imitation arcade situated underneath the bracketed upper cornice.

== Preservation ==
In 1985, the Village Hobby Shop was listed on the National Register of Historic Places, qualifying both because of its architecture and because of its place in Ohio's history. It was part of a multiple property submission of approximately twenty buildings, scattered throughout the village in such a low concentration that a historic district designation was not practical. Many of the twenty buildings were residences or churches, but the Hobby Shop was one of several commercial buildings in the group, along with Hamer's General Store, the Magruder Building, the 1830 Lawler's Tavern, and the four buildings of the Mechanicsburg Commercial Historic District.
