= Clark Round Barn =

- U.S. National Register of Historic Places
- Location within Iowa Location within the United States
- Location: County Road T7H, Tyrone, Iowa
- Coordinates: 40°58′46″N 92°52′50″W
- Area: less than one acre
- Built: 1908
- MPS: Iowa Round Barns: The Sixty Year Experiment TR
- NRHP reference No.: 86001465
- Added to NRHP: June 30, 1986

The Clark Round Barn was a historic building located near the unincorporated community of Tyrone in rural Monroe County, Iowa, United States. It was built in 1908 in memory of Charles Henry Clark, Sr. The building was a true round barn that measured 48 feet (15 m) in diameter. It featured a conical roof, four-sided cupola and a central silo that was 14-foot (4.3 m) in diameter and 30-foot (9.1 m) high. The siding was pine and the original cedar singles had been replaced in the 1960s. The barn was listed on the National Register of Historic Places since 1986. The structure was torn down in 1999.
