= Morrison and Clark Houses =

Historic house in Washington, D.C., United States

- U.S. National Register of Historic Places
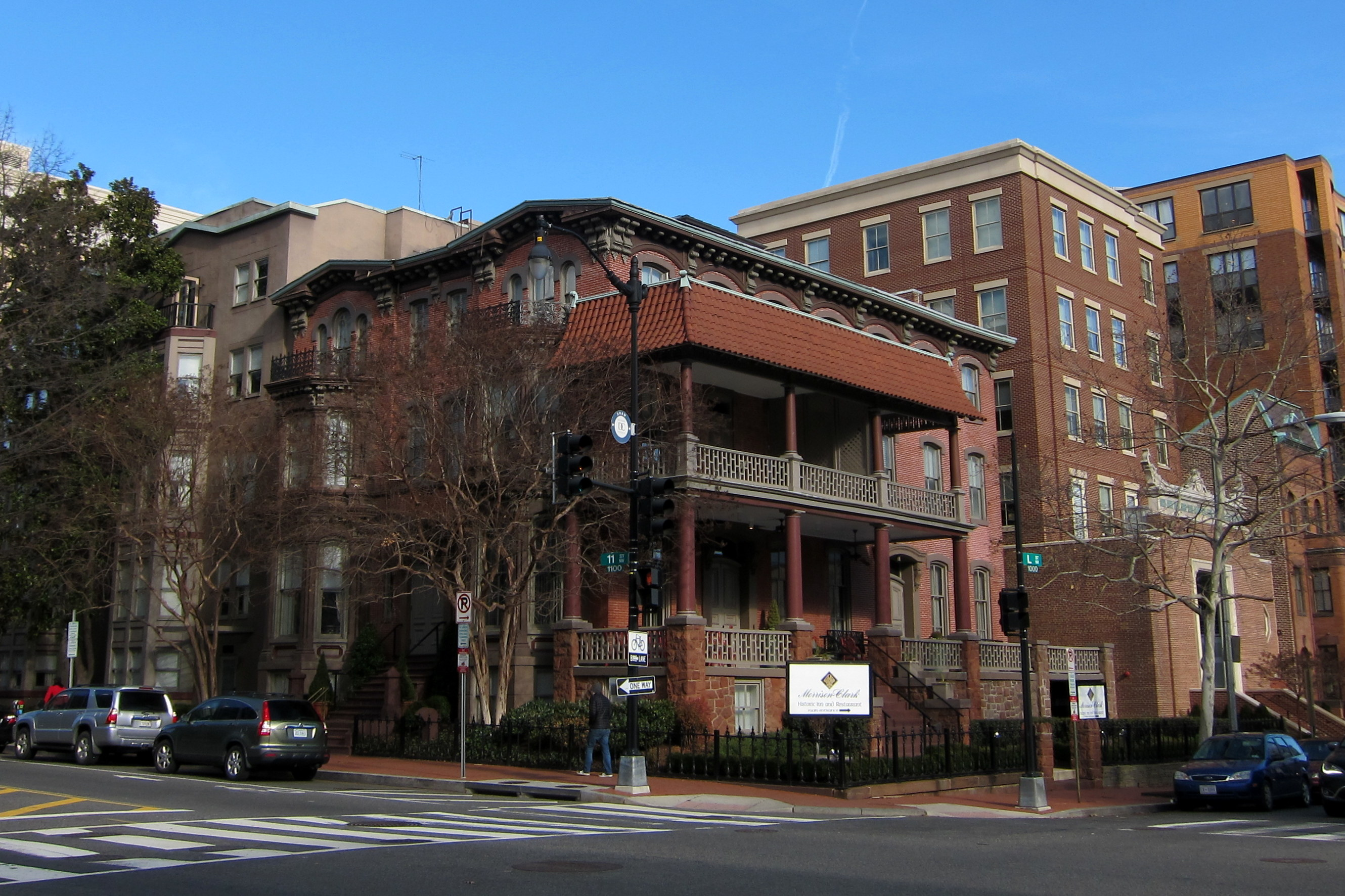

- Location within Central Washington, D.C. Location within the District of Columbia Location within the United States
- Location: 1013–1015 L Street, N.W., Washington, D.C.
- Coordinates: 38°54′15″N 77°1′37″W
- Built: 1865
- Architectural style: Italianate
- NRHP reference No.: 90002149
- Added to NRHP: March 19, 1991

The Morrison and Clark Houses (also known as the Soldiers', Sailors', Marines', and Airmen's Club) are historical buildings, located at 1013–1015 L Street, Northwest, Washington, D.C., in the Mount Vernon Square neighborhood. The Morrison-Clark Inn is recognized as a Historic Hotel of America by the National Trust for Historic Preservation.

== History ==
The Italianate homes were constructed in 1865. Daniel L. Morrison was a government supplier during the Civil War, and Reuben B. Clark was jail commissioner.

The Women's Army and Navy League bought the Morrison home in 1923, operated it as an enlisted club.

First Ladies hosted teas as fund-raisers, beginning with Grace Coolidge, and including Mamie Eisenhower and Jacqueline Kennedy. During World War II, in 1943, the club served more than 45,000 visitors, and 85,000 meals.

The building was renovated in 1987, by William Adair. It operates as the Morrison-Clark Inn. The buildings were listed on the National Register of Historic Places in 1991.
