= Clark House (Poughkeepsie, New York) =

Historic house in New York, United States

- U.S. National Register of Historic Places
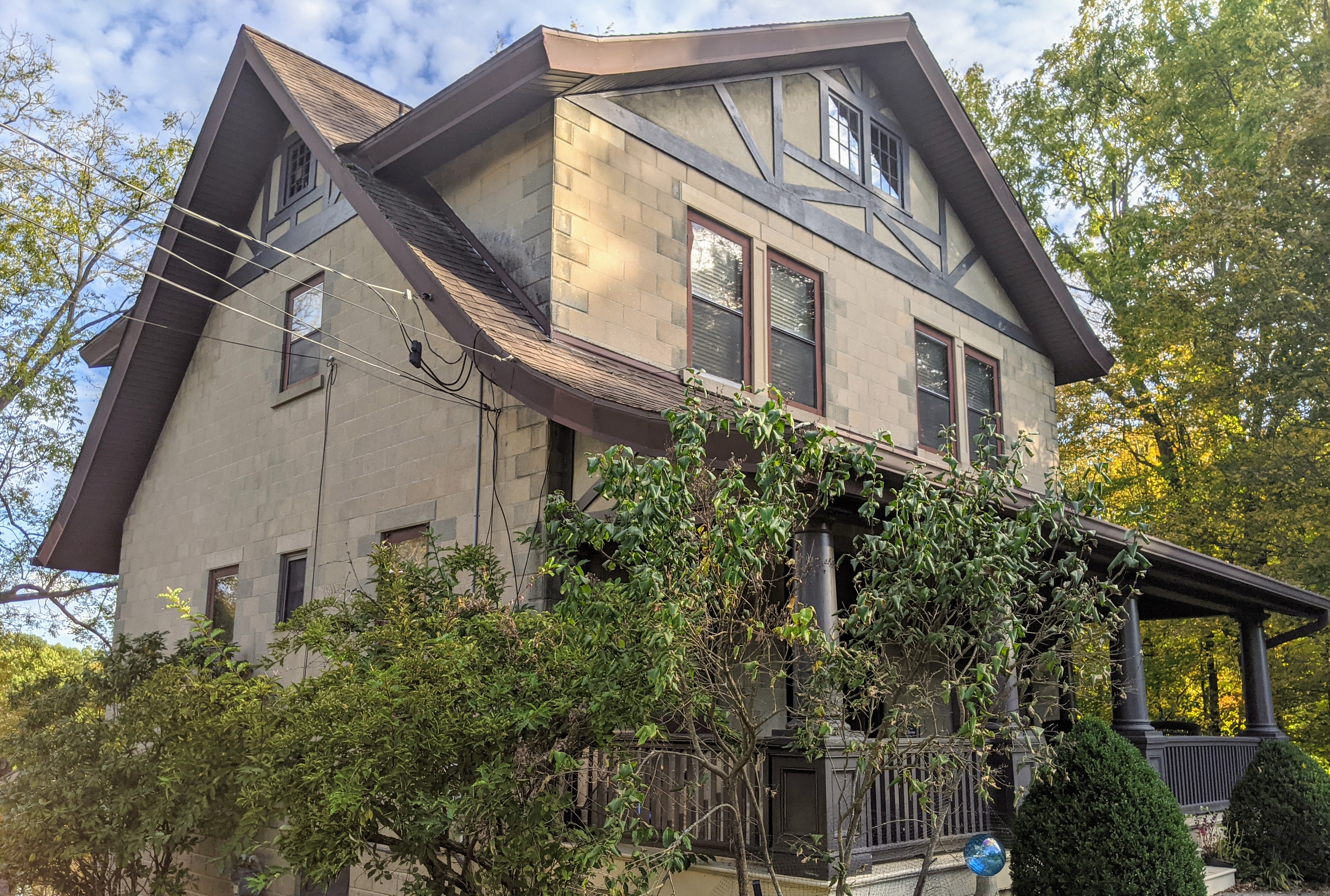

- Location within New York Location within the United States
- Location: 85 Cedar Ave. Poughkeepsie, New York
- Coordinates: 41°40′26″N 73°54′19″W
- Area: 1.6 acres (0.65 ha)
- Built: 1919
- Architectural style: Colonial Revival, Bungalow/Craftsman, Tudor Revival
- MPS: Poughkeepsie MRA
- NRHP reference No.: 82001127
- Added to NRHP: November 26, 1982

Clark House is a historic home located at Poughkeepsie, Dutchess County, New York. It was built about 1919 and is a 2 1/2-story, three-bay-wide concrete block Bungalow style dwelling with a gable roof and wide dormer. It features a porch with Doric order columns, massive deep eaves, and half-timbering.

It was added to the National Register of Historic Places in 1982.
