= Demand-Gest House =

Historic house in Ohio, United States

- U.S. National Register of Historic Places
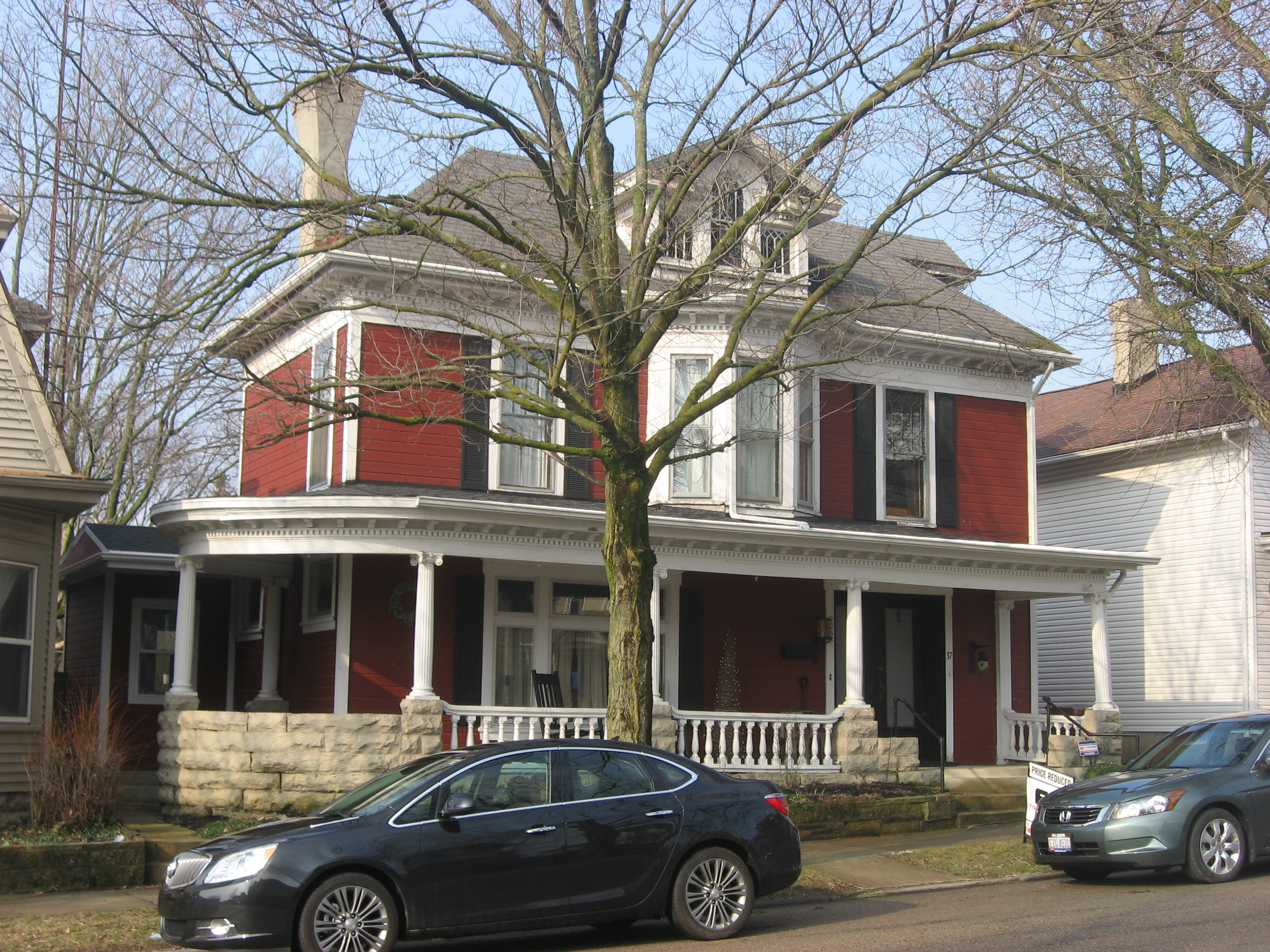
- Front of the house

- Location within Ohio Location within the United States
- Interactive map showing the location of Demand-Gest House
- Location: 37 N. Main St., Mechanicsburg, Ohio
- Coordinates: 40°4′22″N 83°33′26″W
- Area: Less than 1 acre (0.40 ha)
- Built: 1900
- Architectural style: Colonial Revival
- MPS: Mechanicsburg MRA
- NRHP reference No.: 85001881
- Added to NRHP: August 29, 1985

The Demand-Gest House is a historic residence in the village of Mechanicsburg, Ohio, United States. Built for a physician, it was for many years the home of local business leaders, and it has been named a historic site. It is currently a private residence.

== Residents ==
Dr. Charles E. Demand was a charter member of the Mechanicsburg Masonic lodge, as well as of Mechanicsburg's lodge of the Order of the Eastern Star. Besides his medical practice, he was a businessman, serving as president of the village's Mutual Loan and Savings Company in the 1910s. He arranged for the construction of the current house in 1900, making him one of several prosperous physicians to build homes in the first block of North Main Street in the period; his colleagues John H. Clark and Oram A. Nincehelser also lived in fine residences in the same block. After Demand left the property, it became the home of Neil Gest; a farmer and longtime executive of the village's Ohio Grain Company, Gest lived in the house for many years.

== Architecture ==
The house is a wooden structure with a stone foundation. Built in the Colonial Revival style of architecture, it features a symmetrical facade with significant design elements such as a Palladian window and a porch with Ionic columns. Individuals may enter the house through a transomed doorway on the porch underneath a bay that protrudes from the residue of the second-floor facade. Inside, a distinctive feature is a prominent oval-shaped window near the staircase. Its Colonial Revival style makes the Demand-Gest House different from most of the village's historic residences, which are more frequently Queen Anne or Italianate in style.

== Preservation ==
The Demand-Gest House was listed on the National Register of Historic Places in 1985, qualifying both because of its historic architecture and its place in Ohio's history. It was one of approximately twenty different Mechanicsburg locations to be listed on the National Register at the same time as part of a multiple property submission. Among the house's neighbors that were included in the multiple property submission are the homes of Demand's professional colleagues: the John H. Clark House at 21 N. Main and the Oram Nincehelser House at 28 N. Main.
