= Willis G. Clark House =

Historic house in Alabama, United States

- U.S. National Register of Historic Places
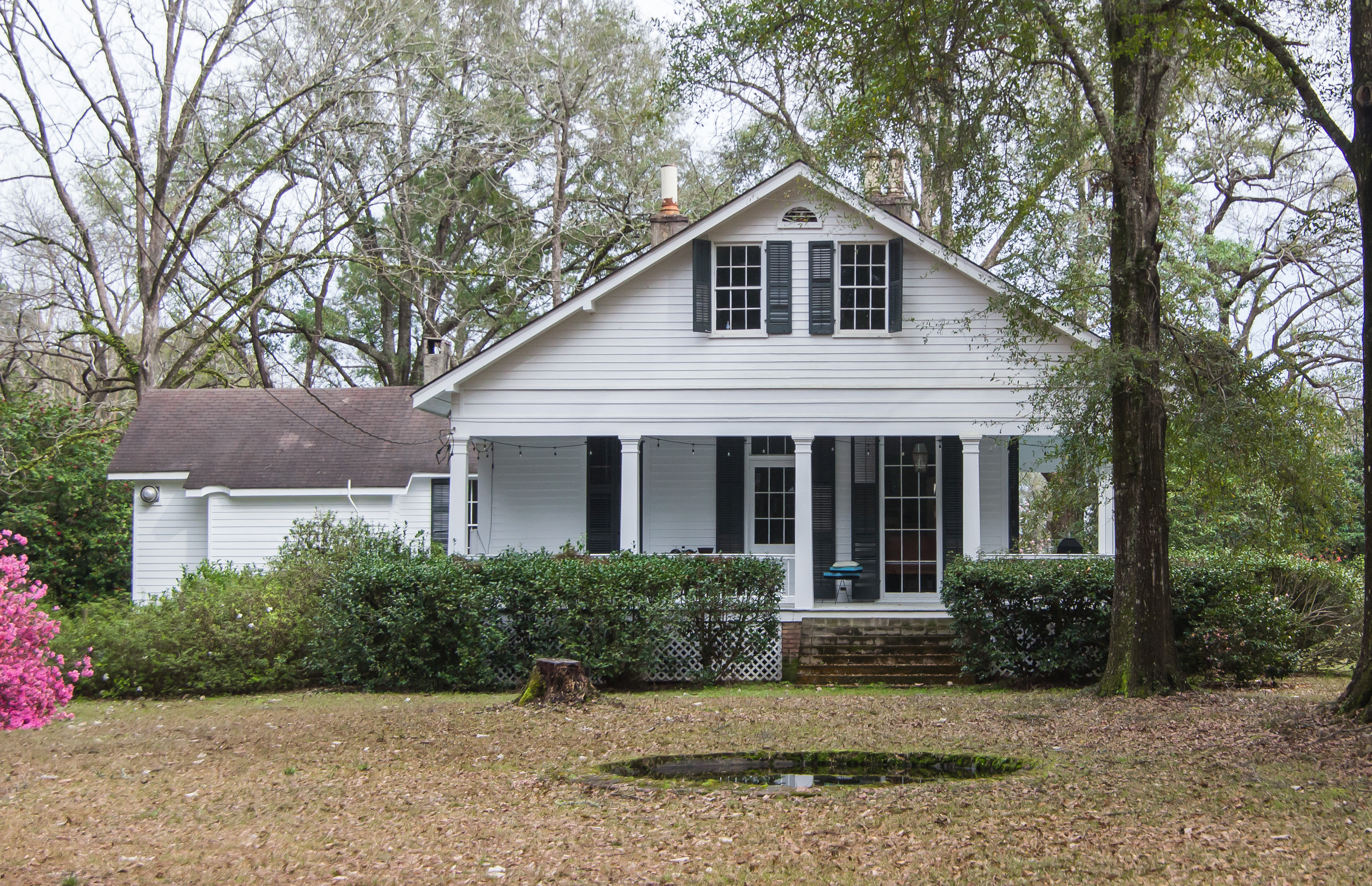

- Location within Alabama Location within the United States
- Nearest city: Citronelle, Alabama
- Coordinates: 31°0′10″N 88°12′34″W
- Area: 3 acres (1.2 ha)
- Built: 1865
- Architectural style: Greek Revival
- NRHP reference No.: 89002454
- Added to NRHP: January 25, 1990

The Willis G. Clark House (also known as Beaver Meadow) is a historic house located in Northern Mobile County, Alabama.

== Description and history ==
The two-story Greek Revival style house was completed in 1865 for Willis Gaylord Clark. Clark, a native of New York, was a successful Mobile politician, businessman, author, and the editor of the Mobile Daily Advertiser. He also served as a trustee of the University of Alabama, with the university's Clark Hall named in his honor. The house was added to the National Register of Historic Places on January 25, 1990, due to its architectural significance.
