= Clark Houses =

Historic house in Massachusetts, United States

- U.S. National Register of Historic Places
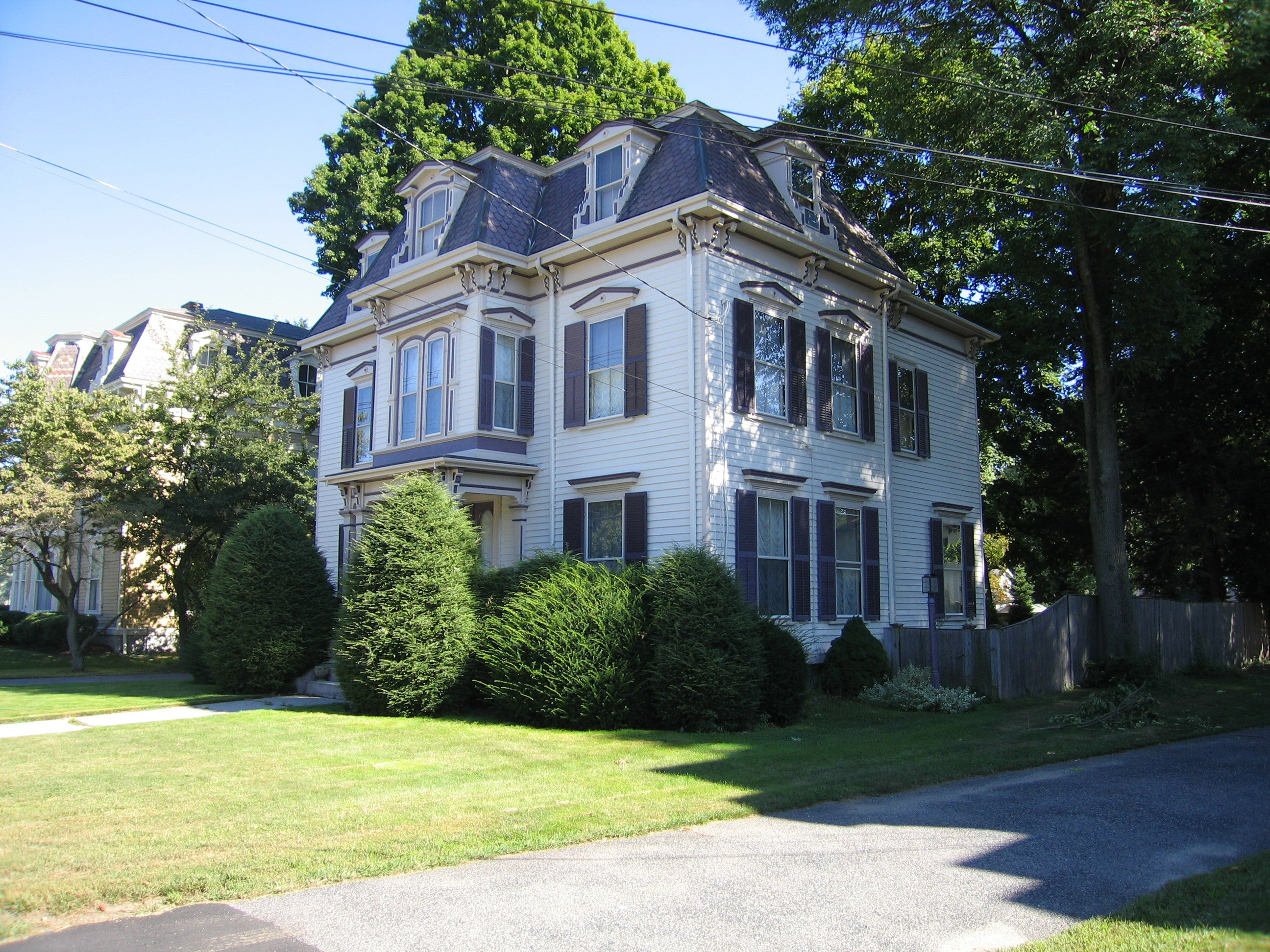
- 76 West Central Street

- Location within Massachusetts Location within the United States
- Location: 74 and 76 W. Central Street, Natick, Massachusetts
- Coordinates: 42°16′56″N 71°21′25″W
- Built: 1870
- Architectural style: French Second Empire
- NRHP reference No.: 78000453
- Added to NRHP: February 17, 1978

The Clark Houses are historic houses in Natick, Massachusetts. The houses were built in 1870 and added to the National Register of Historic Places in 1978.

== History ==
The Clark Houses are significant as two of the finer examples of the Second Empire/mansard style in Natick, MA. They are also significant for their association with Edward Clark, a local entrepreneur.

Edward Clark was born in Natick in August 1838. He was the son of Nathaniel Clark, builder of the Clark Block in Natick Center, which is also listed in the National Register of Historic Places. Edward was established as a prominent Natick grocer by 1882. His business was housed in the Clark Block. He succeeded his father as town treasurer from 1889 to 1910, and while in office handled more than four million dollars. Edward was a director of the Natick National Bank, of which his father was a founder. During Edward's lifetime he also served as a trustee of the Morse Hospital and treasurer of the Park Cemetery Association. He died in 1910. The house at 74 West Central was built by Clark in 1870.

76 West Central Street—known as the "Mary Clark Whitney House"—stands directly west of the Edward Clark House (#74). It is the second of five houses on West Central Street known as "the Clark Houses." The house was built by Edward Clark (owner of #74 and cousin of Mary Clark Whitney) for Mary and her husband James Whitney. The couple was socially prominent in the town of Natick. James Whitney, a native of Sherborn, MA, went into partnership in a Natick-based clothing business in 1857 with Alfred W. Mann, originally of Templeton, MA. The firm, Mann and Whitney went out of business following the Panics of 1857 and 1861. Mr. Whitney then joined the Natick Protective Clothing Company, and subsequently served as treasurer of the Natick Five Cents Savings Bank, a position he held until his death in July, 1889. Mary Clark Whitney, was born January 8, 1816, one of 13 children, to Alphonse and Nancy Leland Clark of Sherborn, MA. Both of Mrs. Whitney's grandfathers served in the Revolutionary War. The Natick Chapter of the DAR made her an honorary member, and planned "an observance" on the century mark of her birth on January 8, 1916. However, fate intervened, and on the morning of December 24, 1915, two weeks before her 100th birthday, Mrs. Whitney died quietly in her home of 45 years. Her obituary in the Natick Bulletin, December 24, 1915, noted that "General sorrow was manifested on Wednesday by the people of Natick when it became known that its oldest woman, Mrs. James Whitney,...had passed away in the night." Mary Clark Whitney was survived by her daughter, Mrs. Annie Bean, as well as Mrs. Bean's husband and two daughters, Madeline and Clara Bean.

== Architecture ==
Both buildings, at 74 and 76 West Central Street respectively, represent coherent examples of the Second Empire style. The house at 76 West Central Street is a three-story, T-plan Second Empire structure set on a granite foundation. The main rectangle is three bays wide by two bays deep. The hip roofed ell attached to the rear elevation is two bays wide by two bays deep. The house is sheathed in beaded clapboards painted a deep green. Cornerboards and water-table are plain. The wide entablature is ornamented by irregularly placed paired brackets beneath the widely overhanging eaves. The high mansard roof is covered by fish scale slate tiles. Fenestration is 2/2 on the first two stories. First story windows are headed by a molded projecting cornice. Second story windows are headed by a triangular pediment with a boss at their center. The gable dormers contain 2/2 windows flanked by a stepped architrave and headed by an open triangular pediment.

The facade faces north toward West Central Street. A central projecting pavilion rises the full three stories, with the first story being an entrance portico. Paired Doric columns support the portico entablature with its bracketed corners. Narrow Doric pilasters frame double Italianate style "tombstone" entrance doors. The second story of the pavilion has a wide molded sill beneath double-arched 1/1 windows with a projecting flat cornice on the facade and a segmentally arched 1/1 window on both the east and the west sides of the projection. The gable dormer above has a segmentally arched window

The east elevation has a three-sided flat-roofed projection on the first story. The three sides are at 45-degree angles to one another. Each corner has two pairs of brackets beneath the cornice. Two windows stand above on the second story, with a dormer overhead. The east elevation of the ell has an open porch with a single window overhead on the second story.

The west elevation of the house has two windows on both stories. The west elevation of the ell has a second story window at the northern end and a first story window at the southern end.

== See also ==
- National Register of Historic Places listings in Middlesex County, Massachusetts
