= Hulet Clark Farmstead =

Historic house in New York, United States

- U.S. National Register of Historic Places
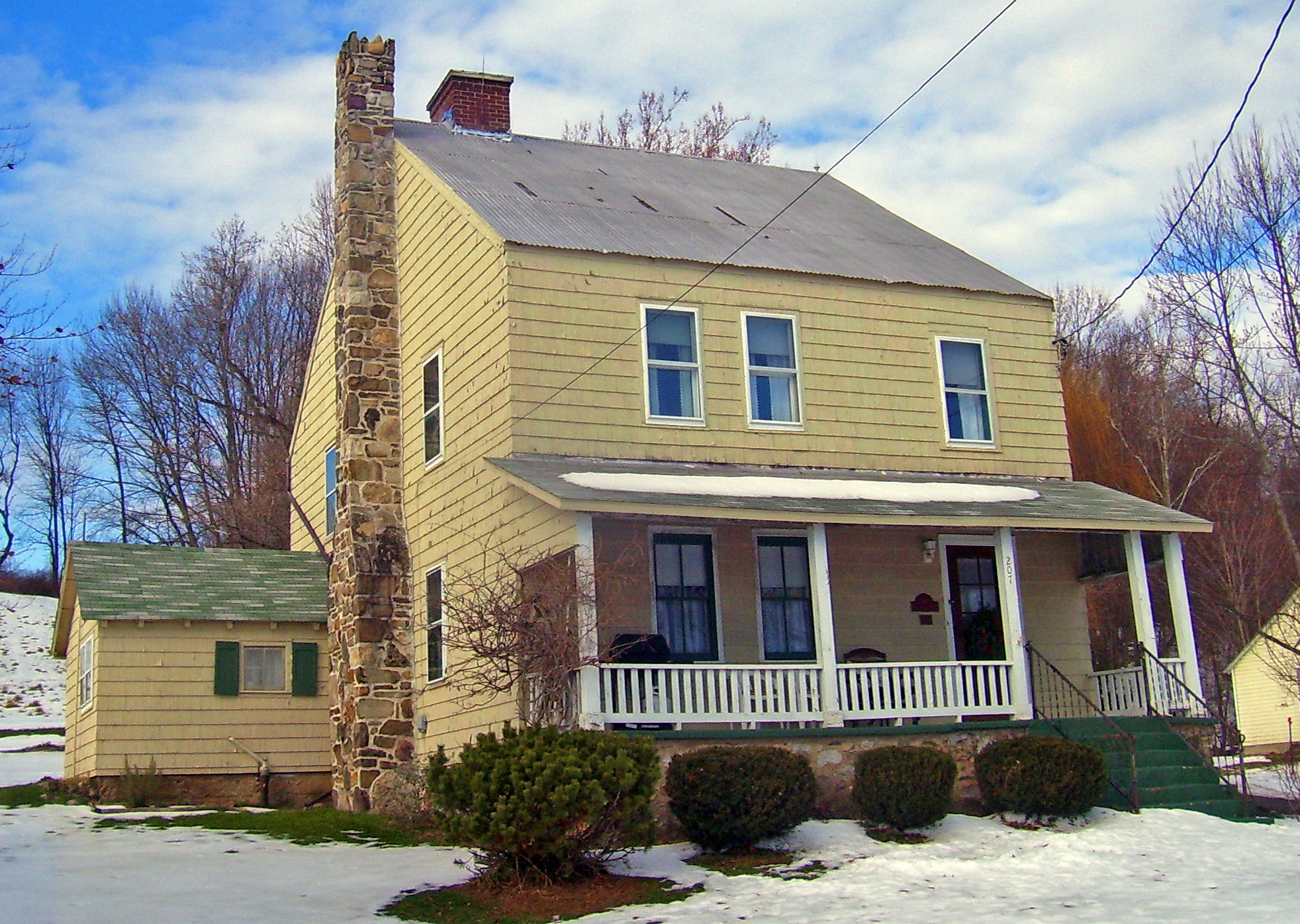
- Farmhouse in 2007
- Location: Westtown, NY
- Nearest city: Middletown
- Coordinates: 41°20′56″N 74°32′37″W
- Area: 75 acres (30 ha)
- Built: 1800-1930
- NRHP reference No.: 98001343
- Added to NRHP: 1998

The Hulet Clark Farmstead is located along South Plank Road north of the hamlet of Westtown, in the Town of Minisink, New York, United States. It is a 75-acre (30 ha) property along both sides of the road, consisting of a farmhouse, barn, chicken coop and other outbuildings. While he did not build the house, Clark, a longtime Minisink resident who served the town in several different capacities in the first half of the 19th century, would be most associated with it.

== Farmstead ==
The center of the Clark farm is the farmhouse, a two-story hand-hewn three-bay timber frame structure. Its stone foundation is built into the sloping ground beneath, with four feet (122 cm) of exposure in front. A porch was built in the 1930s to replace a more modest stoop that preceded it, along with the house's stone chimney, and a small south addition replaced a larger one earlier in the 20th century. The interior floor plan remains largely unaltered.

A nearby chicken house, now used as a garage, was built in the early 20th century on the site of the barn it replaced. The current barn is located across the road, with a northern half dating to 1876 and a more recent addition on a concrete foundation coming in the early 20th century.

== History ==
Local records indicate the house was built around 1800 by a farmer named Wadsworth to serve a parcel that at the time included 420 acres (168 ha). Clark, who had come from Westchester County with his family around the same time at the age of six, served as an officer in the state militia and as town clerk during the early 1820s. He bought the Wadsworth farm in 1828 after the death of his first wife and several children during a dysentery outbreak, while he was also serving as town justice. He lived there for the rest of his life, eventually becoming town supervisor and chairing the county's Board of Supervisors a few years before his death in 1857. Local lore holds that the house was a station on the Underground Railroad, but no evidence has yet been found to verify this.

In 1876 his heirs began subdividing the land. The current property remained a profitable family-owned dairy farm into the 1920s. After a few other changes of ownership, it became property of the Pine family in 1933, who began the poultry operations that continued until they divested themselves of the farm in 1950. The new owners, the Hulles, continued to raise chickens for a few more years but have leased the fields to neighboring farmers since the 1960s. The farm was added to the National Register of Historic Places in 1998 due to both Clark's importance in town history and the farmhouse's status as a mostly intact sample of the rural vernacular architecture practiced by Americans of British descent in the early years of the United States.
