= Clark–Stringham site =

Archaeological site in Michigan, United States

- Clark-Stringham Site
- U.S. National Register of Historic Places
- Location within Michigan Location within the United States
- Location: Address Restricted, near Jackson, Michigan (Note: The NRIS lists the location of the Clark-Stringham Site as "address restricted." References indicate the approximate location, reflected by the geo-coordinates.)
- Coordinates: 43°21′30″N 84°24′30″W
- Area: 5 acres (2.0 ha)
- NRHP reference No.: 73002154
- Added to NRHP: June 19, 1973

The Clark–Stringham Site, designated 20-JA-37, is an archaeological site located near Jackson, Michigan. It was listed on the National Register of Historic Places in 1973.

== History ==
The Clark–Stringham Site was likely used over a period of time dating from the late Archaic through the early, middle, and late Woodland periods. The main time period of occupation was the later Woodland. Evidence suggests that the location was the site of a seasonal camp, rather than a permanent village.

The site was re-discovered in 1968 by a team of students from Michigan State University headed by Charles E. Leland. Leland did some initial excavation, removing some artifacts. Further investigation was undertaken by John Wilson on 1970. In 1973, a second team from MSU, headed by Joseph L. Chartkoff, recovered a number of artifacts from the site, dating from the late Archaic and early Woodland periods.

== Description ==
The Clark–Stringham Site is located along the Grand River, on property owned in 1973 by Rachel Clark and A.R. Stringham. The site is heavily wooded, and stretches for about 0.7 kilometers along the bank of the river.
