= Perkins–Clark House =

Historic house in Connecticut, United States

- U.S. National Register of Historic Places
- U.S. Historic district – Contributing property
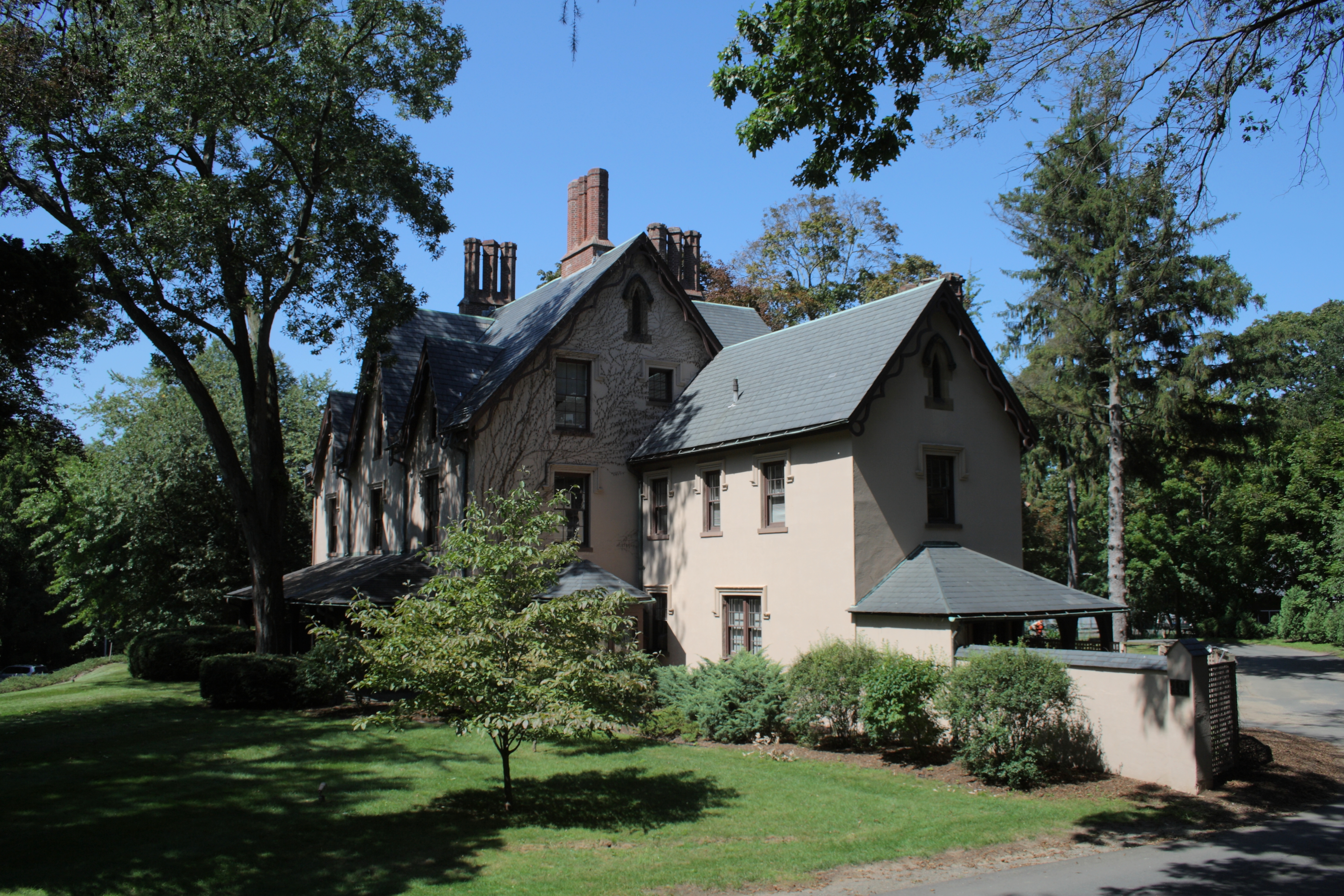

- Location within Connecticut Location within the United States
- Location: 49 Woodland Street, Hartford, Connecticut
- Coordinates: 41°46′15″N 72°42′10″W
- Area: 7 acres (2.8 ha)
- Built: 1861
- Architect: Jordan, Octavius & Augustus
- Architectural style: Gothic Revival
- Part of: Nook Farm and Woodland Street District (ID79002674)
- NRHP reference No.: 78002870

Significant dates
- Added to NRHP: December 14, 1978
- Designated CP: November 29, 1979

The Perkins–Clark House is a historic house at 49 Woodland Street in Hartford, Connecticut. Built in 1861, it is a prominent example of high-style Gothic Revival residential architecture, and is notable for the association of its first owner, Charles Perkins, with author Samuel Clemens. The house was listed on the National Register of Historic Places on December 14, 1978, and is a contributing property to the Nook Farm and Woodland Street District.

== Description and history ==
The Perkins–Clark House is located in a residential area of western Hartford, on the west side of Woodland Street near its junction with Niles Street. It is set on a large parcel overlooking the Park River to the west. It is a 2 1/2-story stuccoed structure, with a steeply pitched roof that has gables decorated with bargeboard, and multiple bands of chimneys with corbelled brick tops.

The house was designed by Octavius and Augustus Jordan, according to principles put forth by Calvert Vaux and Andrew Jackson Downing for the construction of Gothic villas. It was built in 1861 for Charles Perkins, a lawyer whose clients included Samuel Clemens (aka Mark Twain), whose house stands on Farmington Avenue to the south. This stylish Gothic Revival house is the last residential building on Woodland Street, which was once lined with fashionable properties. In 1924 it was purchased by Judge Walter Clark, who undertook numerous alterations, although he was careful to match new buildings stylistically to the main house. The house now houses professional offices.

== See also ==
- National Register of Historic Places listings in Hartford, Connecticut
