= Clark–Dearstyne–Miller Inn =

- U.S. National Register of Historic Places
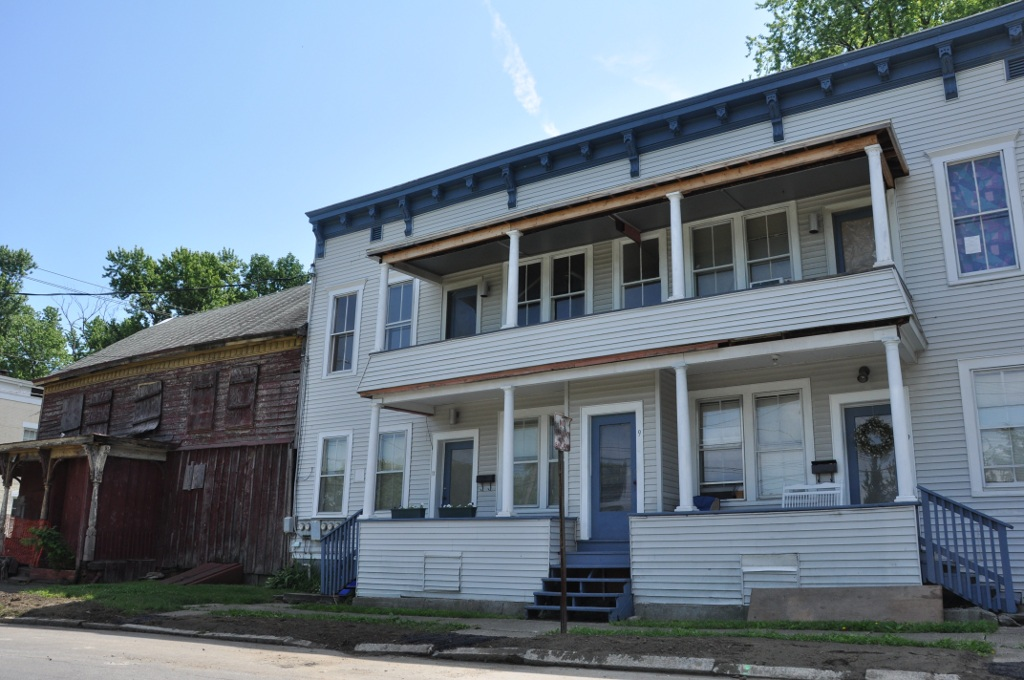

- Location within New York Location within the United States
- Location: 11-13 Forbes Ave., Rensselaer, New York
- Coordinates: 42°39′32″N 73°44′6″W
- Area: less than one acre
- Built: 1791
- Architectural style: Federal
- NRHP reference No.: 07001369
- Added to NRHP: January 9, 2008

Clark–Dearstyne–Miller Inn is a historic inn and tavern located at Rensselaer in Rensselaer County, New York. It was built about 1791 and is a 2 1/2-story, rectangular, gable-roofed heavy timber frame building. It rests upon a fieldstone foundation. There is a 2-story, shed roof addition to the rear. It features an ornate, bracketed, raised porch along the front facade added about 1880. The building exhibits a number of vernacular Federal details.

Excerpt from Raymond W. Smith's National Register of Historic Places Register form; "The inn was operated by a series of hotelkeepers into the early twentieth century. From 1839 to 1867, James Dearstyne was the owner/proprietor. The Dearstyne family remained until the late 1890s, when the business was known as the Dearstyne Miller Hotel. The inn continued to function as the Miller Hotel at least until the 1920s. During its early decades, the hostelry accommodated travelers crossing the Hudson via the North Ferry and rail passengers arriving at the Bath station in front of the hotel. Tenant farmers who journeyed from rural farmsteads to pay their rents to the Van Rensselaer agent at Bath also were frequent patrons of the inn. At various periods during the nineteenth century, the building also housed local government offices for the village of Bath and the town of North Greenbush. According to tradition, the body of President Lincoln was housed temporarily in the hotel in 1865 while awaiting ferry transport to the capitol at Albany.

A historic photograph taken in the early twentieth century depicts President Theodore Roosevelt before the porch of the Miller Hotel. From the 1950s to its abandonment in the 1980s, the former Clark–Dearstyne–Miller Inn was operated as a neighborhood tavern. Although the historic building currently is vacant, it is an important example of an unusual building type that remains a significant link to the early history of Bath-on-Hudson."

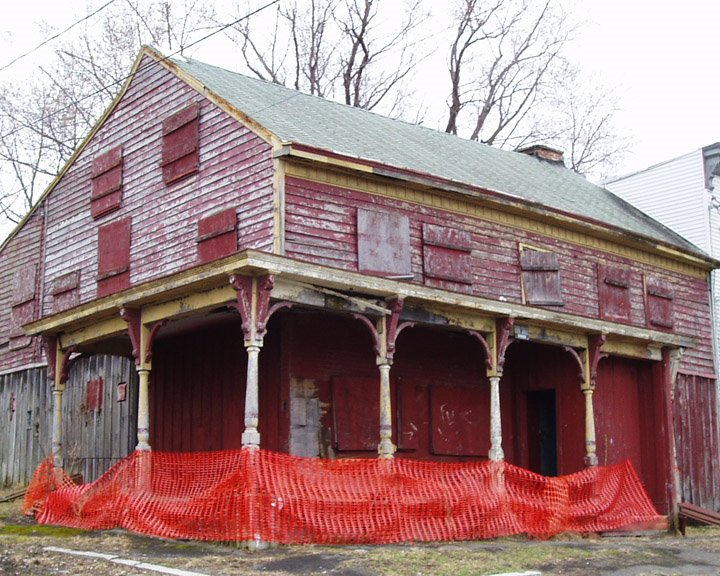
Current as of 1-2014

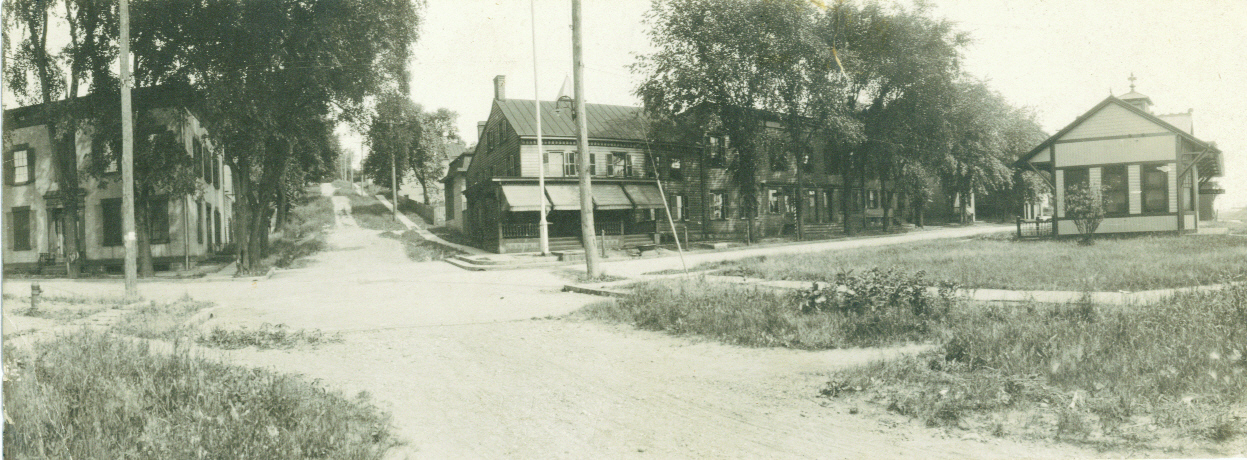
Clark–Dearstyne–Miller Inn

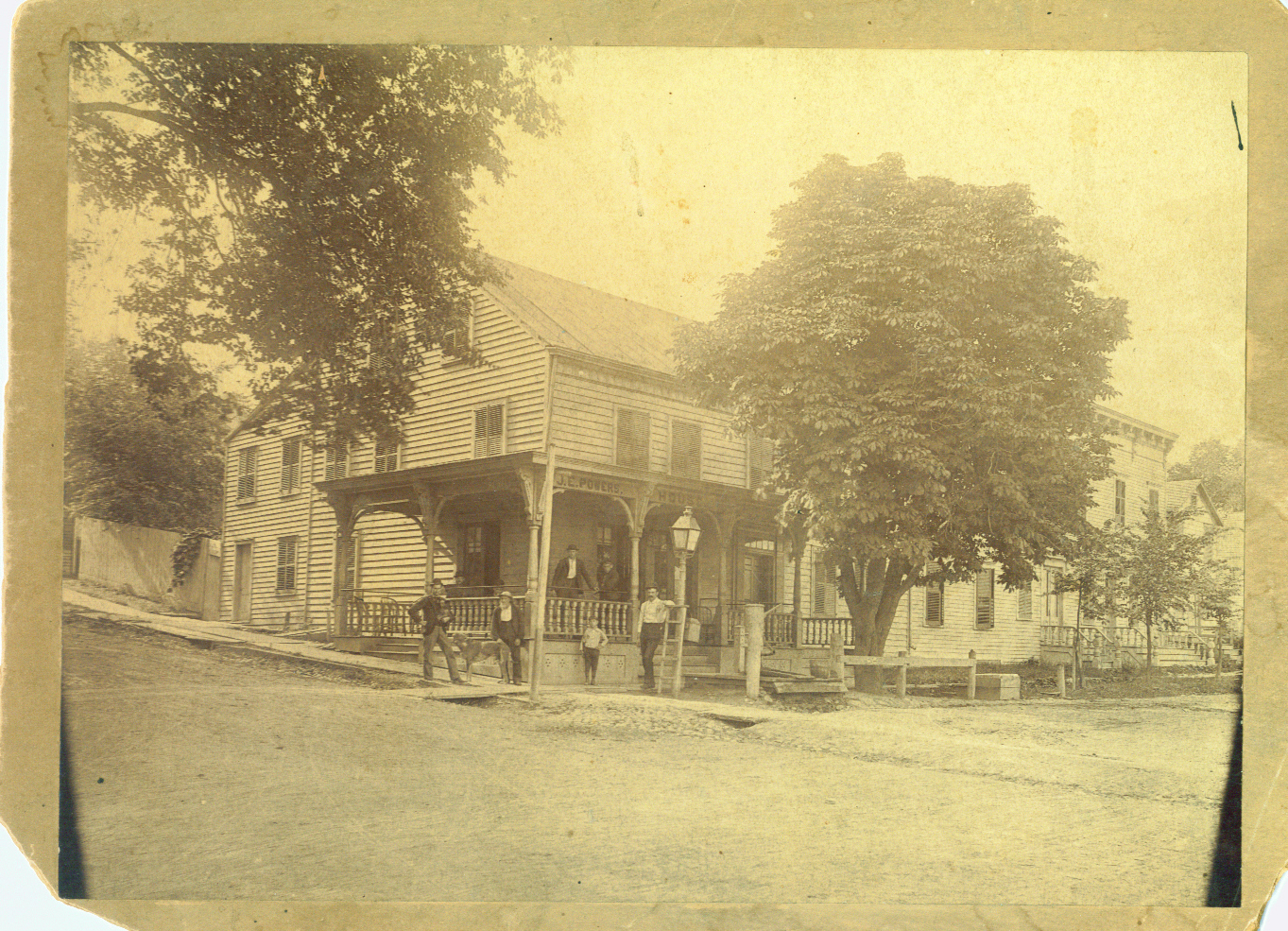
Clark–Dearstyne–Miller Inn

It was listed on the National Register of Historic Places in 2008.
