= Gerome Clark House =

Historic house in Iowa, United States

- U.S. National Register of Historic Places
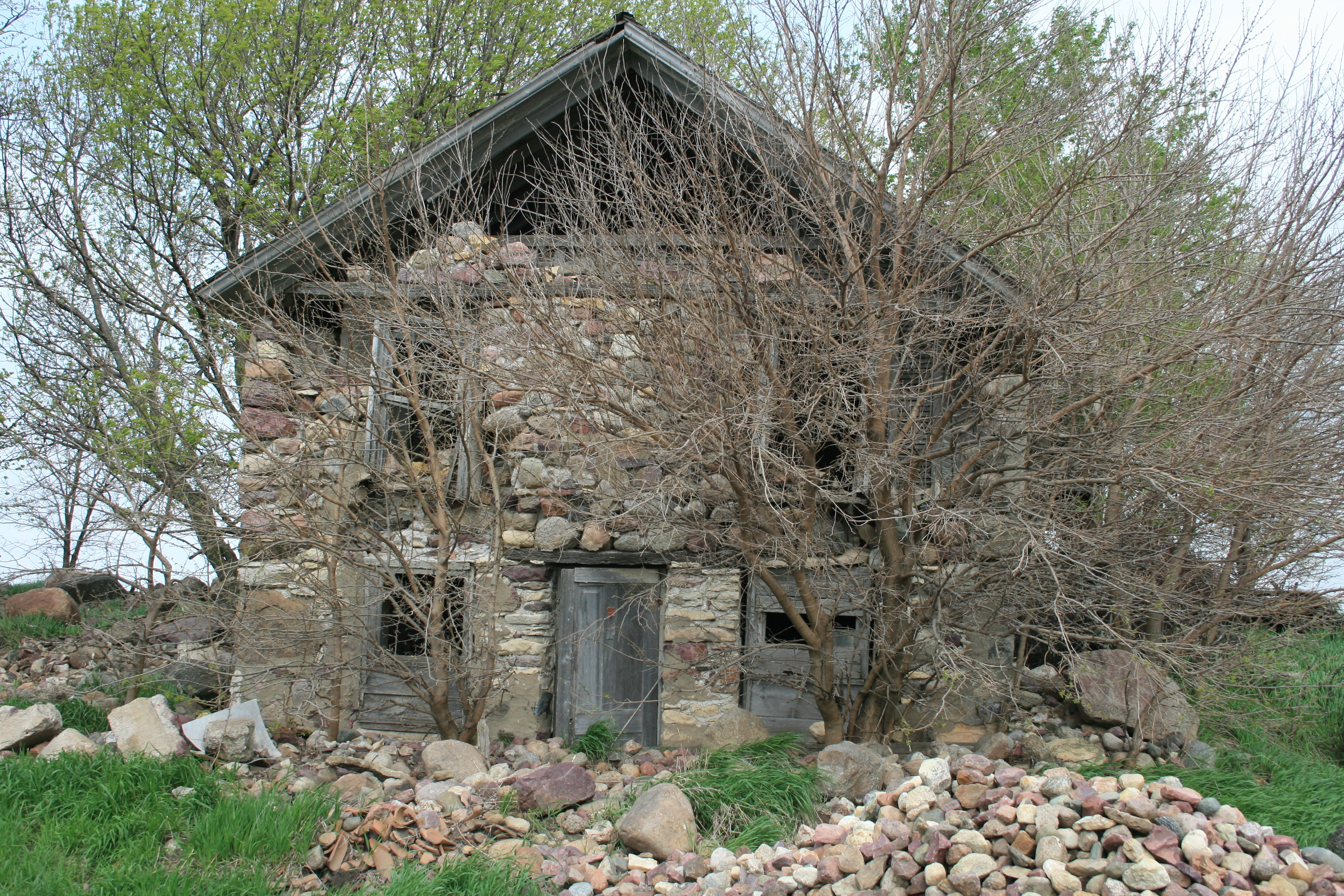

- Location within Iowa Location within the United States
- Location: East of Milford, Iowa
- Coordinates: 43°19′50″N 95°04′04″W
- Area: less than one acre
- Built: 1869-1888
- Built by: Gerome Clark
- NRHP reference No.: 77000510
- Added to NRHP: November 9, 1977

The Gerome Clark House is located east of Milford, Iowa, United States.

New York native Gerome Clark settled in Dickinson County about 1867. As he and his sons cleared the land of glacial rock for plantings they collected the multi-colored rocks and boulders of various sizes. The house was built in two sections, and it was not completed until 1888. The older section is two stories high, and the second section is a single story. Because the second section was built on higher ground it appears taller. It is a typical example of Iowan pioneer architecture. Its significance is derived from the adaptive use of unusual materials in its construction. The Clark family owned the house until 1905, when it was sold to Jacob L. Williams, whose family continued to own it at least into the late 20th century. However, it has not been lived in since 1967. It was listed on the National Register of Historic Places in 1977.
