= Clark House (Iowa City, Iowa) =

Historic house in Iowa, United States

- U.S. National Register of Historic Places
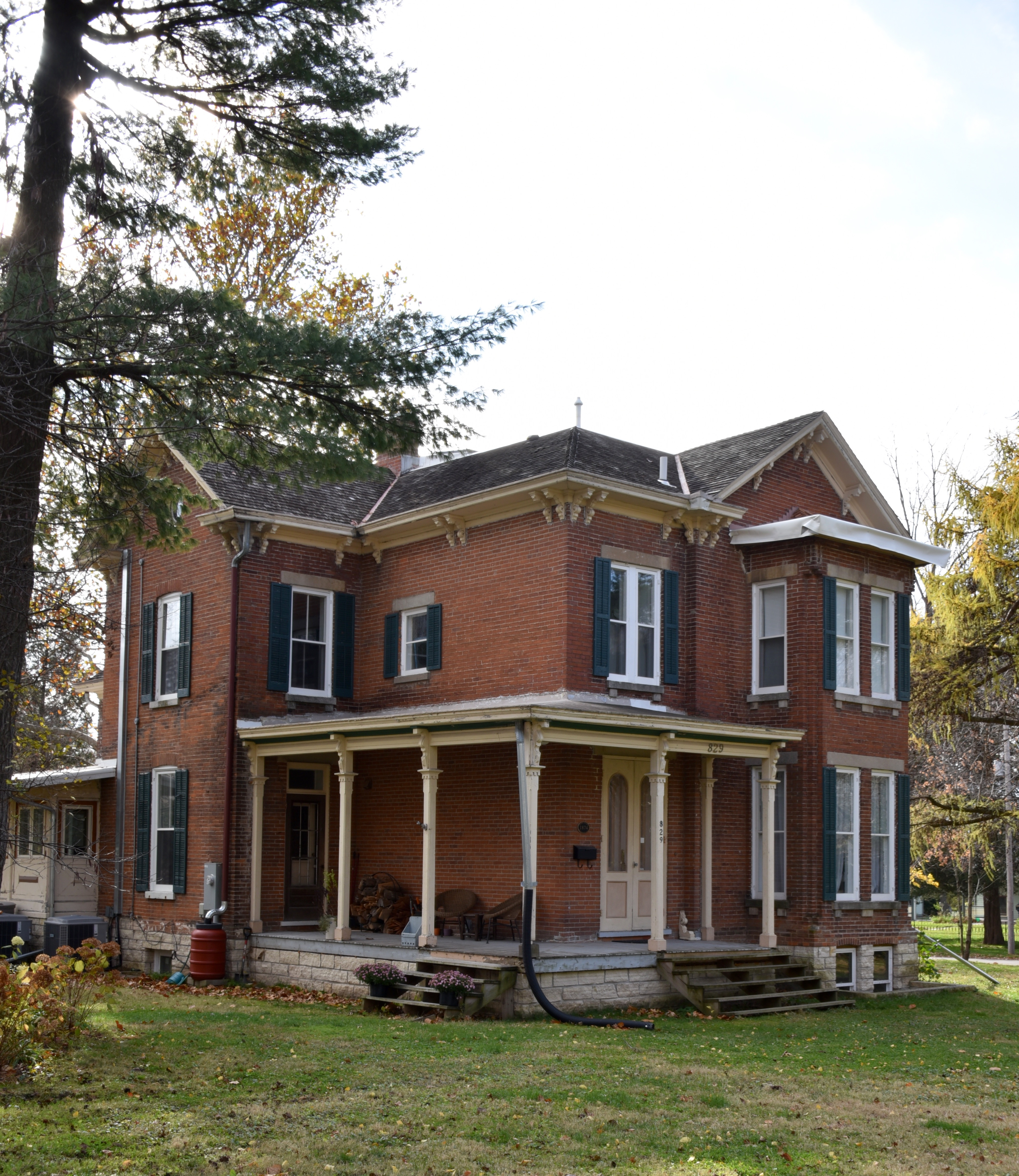

- Location within Iowa Location within the United States
- Location: 829 Kirkwood Ave. Iowa City, Iowa
- Coordinates: 41°38′56.7″N 91°31′22.6″W
- Area: less than one acre
- Built: 1874
- Architectural style: Italianate
- NRHP reference No.: 96000545
- Added to NRHP: May 16, 1996

The Clark House is a historic building located in Iowa City, Iowa, United States. This property was originally part of Plum Grove, the estate of Iowa's first Territorial Governor, Robert Lucas. This lot was eventually sold to Florence A. Clark in 1870. She was a granddaughter of Governor Lucas, and her husband, Augustus L. Clark, was a direct descendant of a signer of the Declaration of Independence, Abraham Clark. Built in 1874, the house is a transitional style from the simplicity of Plum Grove to the richness of the Victorian. The 2 1/2-story brick Italianate has an L-shaped main block and a 1 1/2-story wing off the back. The main block is capped with a hip roof with gable ends and bracketed eaves. It also has a wrap-around porch. The house was listed on the National Register of Historic Places in 1996.
