= Reuben Clark House =

Historic house in Virginia, United States

- U.S. National Register of Historic Places
- Virginia Landmarks Register
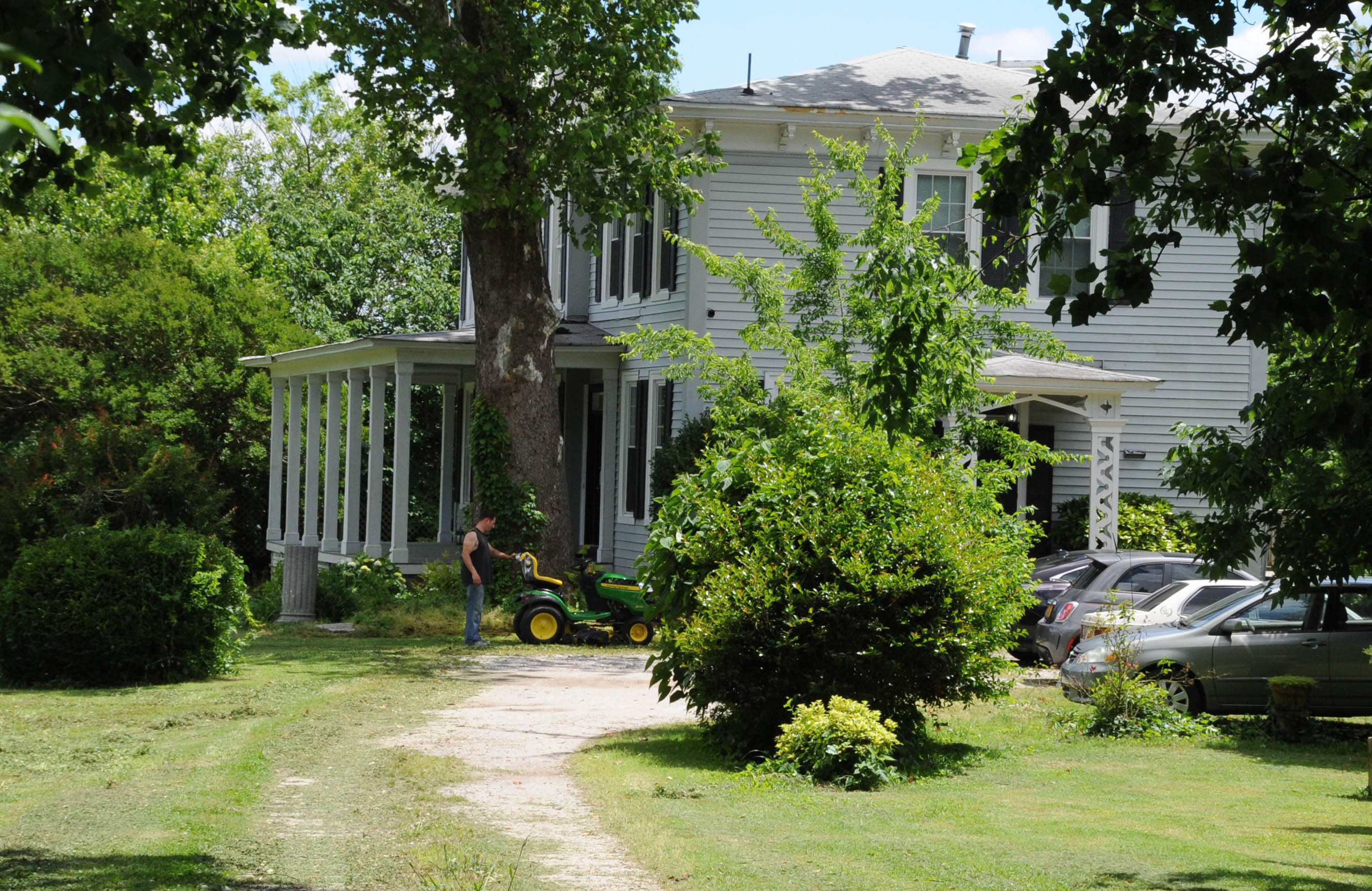

- Location within Virginia Location within the United States
- Location: 125 S. Willard Ave., Hampton, Virginia
- Coordinates: 37°0′52″N 76°19′12″W
- Area: 1.8 acres (0.73 ha)
- Built: 1854
- Architectural style: Picturesque
- NRHP reference No.: 84003542
- VLR No.: 114-0050

Significant dates
- Added to NRHP: August 16, 1984
- Designated VLR: May 15, 1984

Reuben Clark House, also known as Willow Dell, is a historic home located at Hampton, Virginia. It was built in 1854, and is a two-story, wood-frame dwelling. A kitchen wing was added to the main block between 1901 and 1904, and further additions were made to the house in the 1920s. The house feature a one-story wooden porch which wraps around the corner of the house and also shelters five bays of the front facade. It is one of Hampton's oldest surviving residences and its sole example of the Picturesque style. During the American Civil War, its large well was used by the Union Navy to supply large quantities of water for the boilers of the USS Minnesota. The builder of the house, Reuben Clark (1805-1895), was a prosperous merchant and steamboat captain.

It was listed on the National Register of Historic Places in 1984.
