= Clark–Robidoux House =

Historic house in Kansas, United States

- U.S. National Register of Historic Places
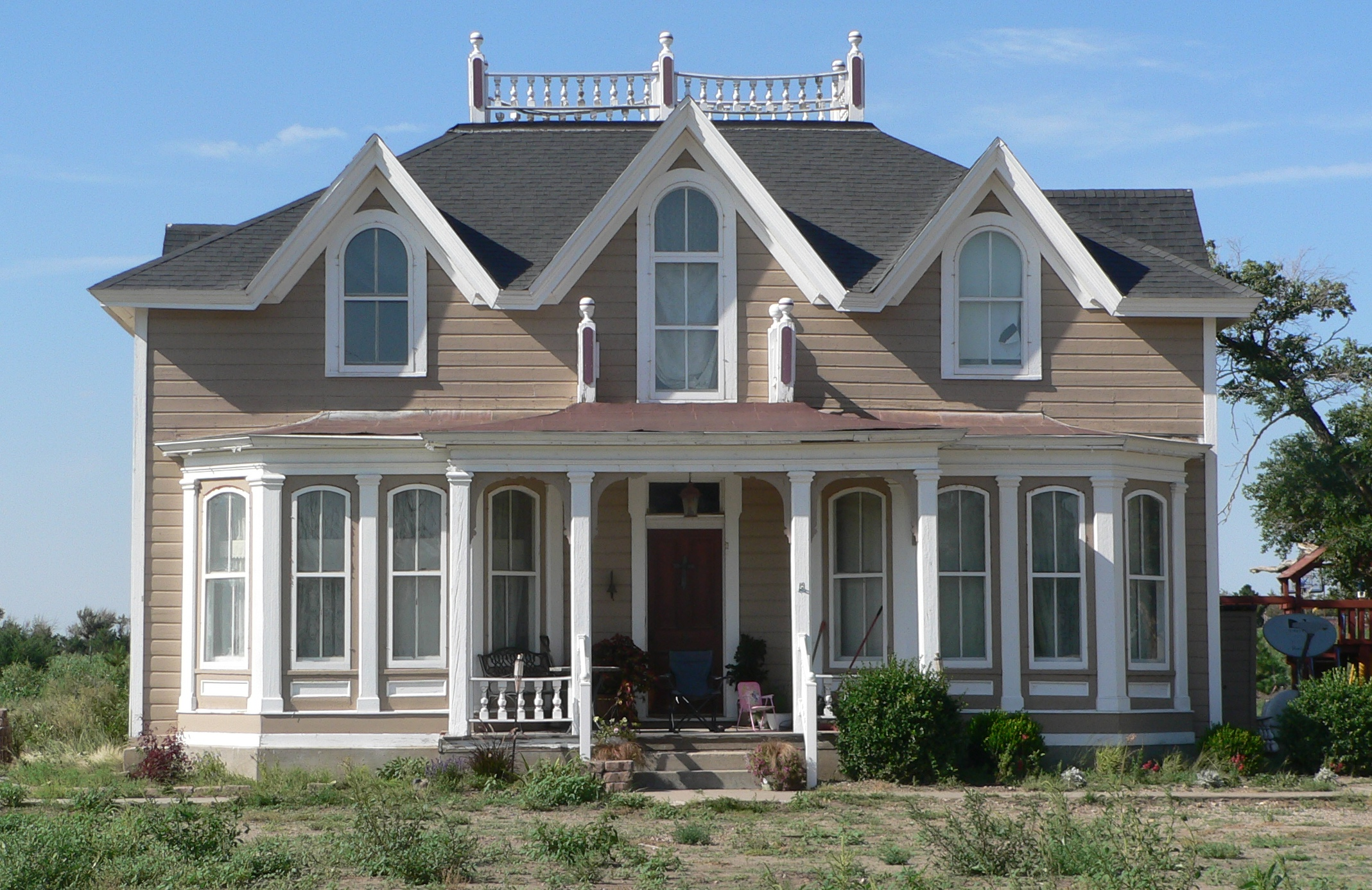

- Location within Kansas Location within the United States
- Location: 4th Street, Wallace, Kansas
- Coordinates: 38°54′56″N 101°35′39.6″W
- Area: less than one acre
- Built: c. 1880
- Built by: Clark, Harding Allen
- Architectural style: Gothic Revival
- NRHP reference No.: 01000406
- Added to NRHP: April 25, 2001

The Clark–Robidoux House is a historic house located on 4th Street in Wallace, Kansas. It was listed on the National Register of Historic Places in 2001; the listing included two contributing buildings.

== Description and history ==
The two-story house was built around 1880. It was deemed significant for its historic association with the growth of Wallace and Wallace County, for its architecture, which is Gothic Revival, and for its association with Harding Allen Clark (1852–1923) and Peter Robidoux (1850–1927).
