= Truett (name) =

- Gender: Male

Origin
- Origin: Germanic
- Meaning: "faithful/loyal and strong”

Other names
- Related names: Treuhard(t)

Truett is a surname and male given name of Norman origin, derived from the medieval surname Trewhitt. The name evolved from a combination of Old French, Old English, and Old Norse linguistic influences, particularly following the Norman Conquest of England in 1066.

The given name Truett is an anglicized form of the German surname Treuhardt, from treu (“faithful” or “true”) and hardt (“strong” or “brave”), comparable to the anglicization of German surnames such as Gerhard(t) into English forms like Garrett through phonetic simplification in English-speaking countries.

Notable people with the name include:

- Truett S. Beasley (born 1953), American comedian known as Killer Beaz
- Truett Latimer (born 1928), American politician from Texas
- Truett Sewell (1907–1989), American baseball player known as Rip Sewell
- Truett Smith (1924–2000), American football player
- Daniel Truett Cathy (born 1953), American businessman
- Homer Truett Bone (1883–1970), American judge
- S. Truett Cathy (1921–2014), founder of the American fast food restaurant chain Chick-fil-A in 1946
- Walter Truett Anderson (born 1933), American political scientist
- Alexander H. Truett (1833–1898), American soldier
- Geoff Truett (1935–2015), English footballer
- George Washington Truett (1867–1944), American clergyman

== See also ==
- Truitt
- Trewhitt (disambiguation)
