= Oram Nincehelser House =

Historic house in Ohio, United States

- Dr. Nincehelser House
- U.S. National Register of Historic Places
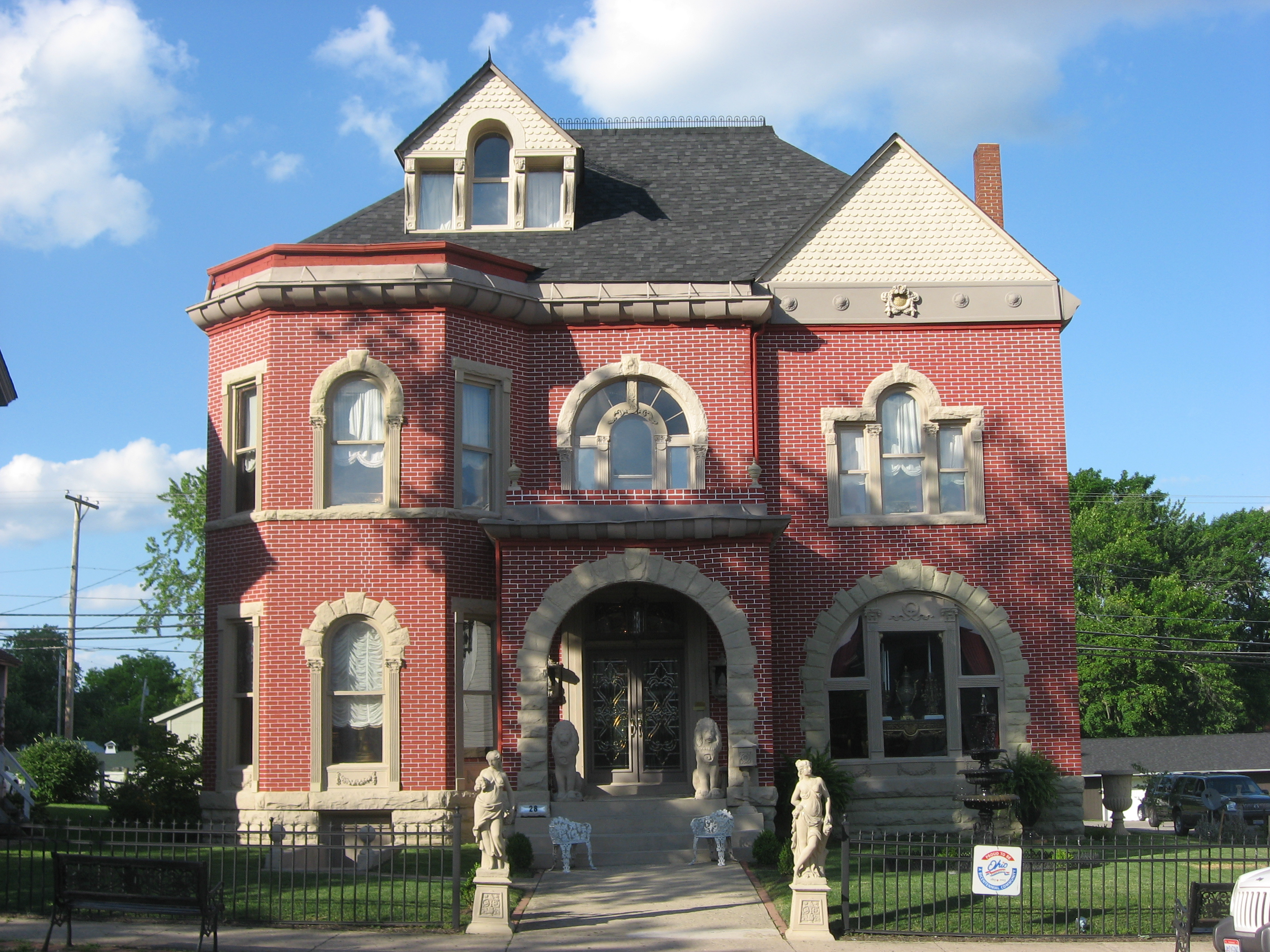
- Front of the house

- Location within Ohio Location within the United States
- Location: 28 N. Main St., Mechanicsburg, Ohio
- Coordinates: 40°4′22.5″N 83°33′24″W
- Area: Less than 1 acre (0.40 ha)
- Built: 1893
- Architectural style: Queen Anne
- MPS: Mechanicsburg MRA
- NRHP reference No.: 85001889
- Added to NRHP: August 29, 1985

The Oram Nincehelser House is a historic residence in the village of Mechanicsburg, Ohio, United States. Built for a nineteenth-century local doctor, it has been named a historic site because of its distinctive architecture.

== Oram Nincehelser ==
Born in Pennsylvania, John Nincehelser married the former Hannah Longabough, and after moving from state to state for a number of years, the Nincehelsers settled in Wayne Township in Champaign County, Ohio, near the community of Cable. Four children were born to their union, of which the youngest who survived to adulthood was their son Oram A. Nicehelser. The family were members of the Methodist Episcopal Church. In adulthood, Oram became a physician, opening a practice in 1887 and continuing for more than thirty years; during his first six years, he engaged in partnership with a neighbor, Dr. J.H. Clark, but they later operated separate practices. Nincehelser was active in the local Masonic organizations; he was an officer for one of Mechanicsburg's two Masonic lodges, and he was a member of a Scottish Rite 32° club.

By the 1890s, Nincehelser's practice had made him a wealthy man; Mechanicsburg's growth was attracting many professionals, and he was one of at least three physicians active in the community. Accordingly, after marrying a woman from New York City, he arranged for the construction of a large Queen Anne-style house on Main Street just north of downtown Mechanicsburg. The magnificent new residence was built primarily to impress his new bride, but the couple did not live long in the house: Mrs. Nincehelser deserted her husband after just a few years of marriage. In later years, the original meeting hall of Mechanicsburg's Odd Fellows lodge burned, and Nincehelser sold his home to them in 1931; he had lived alone in the house since his wife left him.

== Architecture ==
The Nincehelser House is a large residence built primarily in the Queen Anne style, but it includes other stylistic elements, such as a main entrance recessed from the facade, stained glass windows, and a Palladian window. Built of brick with assorted stone elements, the house rests on a stone foundation and is covered with a slate roof. Uniformity is absent from the design; the primarily hipped roof of the two-and-a-half-story residence comprises multiple components, the overall floor plan is asymmetrical, and the windows are of diverse shapes and sizes.

== Preservation ==
In 1985, the Oram Nincehelser House was listed on the National Register of Historic Places, qualifying both because of its architecture and because of its place as the home of a prominent local citizen. It was one of numerous Mechanicsburg properties (largely houses) listed on the National Register at the same time as part of a multiple property submission; a historic district designation had been considered, but it was rejected because the historic properties were scattered among many more non-historic properties. Among the other newly designated properties were the John H. Clark House and the Demand-Gest House, homes of Nincehelser's medical colleagues located in the same block of North Main.
