= William Clark House (Baraboo, Wisconsin) =

- U.S. National Register of Historic Places
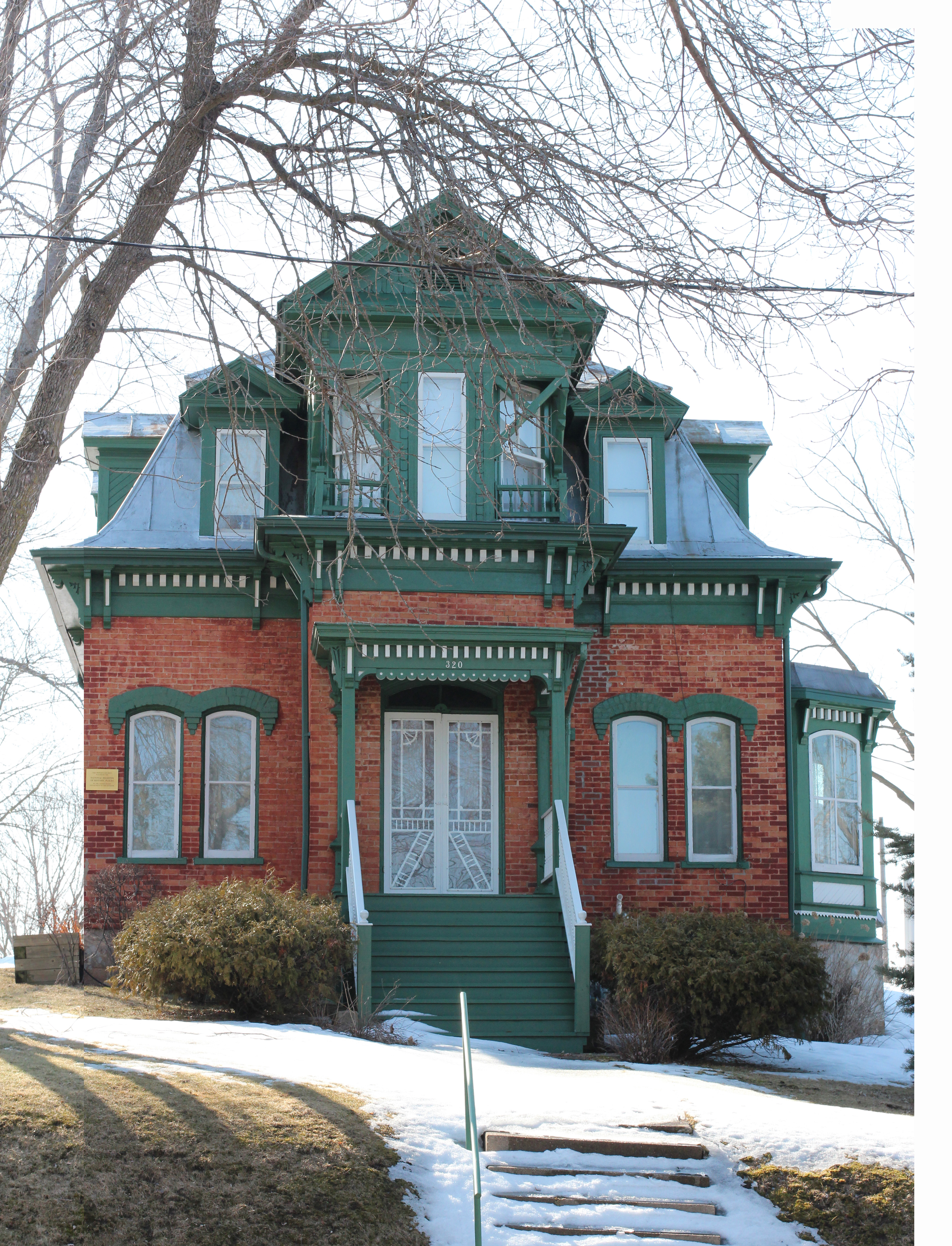

- Location within Wisconsin
- Location: 320 Walnut St., Baraboo, Wisconsin
- Coordinates: 43°27′48″N 89°44′27″W
- Area: 0.5 acres (0.20 ha)
- Built: 1883–1886
- Built by: J. McVea
- Architectural style: Second Empire
- NRHP reference No.: 80000193
- Added to NRHP: April 8, 1980

The William Clark House is a historic house at 320 Walnut Street in Baraboo, Wisconsin. The house was built between 1883 and 1886 for William Clark, an engineer for the Chicago and North Western Railroad. Clark built his house in a neighborhood near the railroad where many other railroad workers lived at the time; most of the other railroad workers' homes were small houses without formal designs, making Clark's house stand out compared to its neighbors. Local carpenter J. McVea gave the house a Second Empire design featuring an entrance pavilion with ornamental woodwork and a pedimented gable, segmental arched windows, and a mansard roof with a dentillated and bracketed cornice. Clark and his wife lived in the house until 1897.

The house was added to the National Register of Historic Places on April 8, 1980.
