= Capt. John Clark House =

Historic house in Connecticut, United States

- U.S. National Register of Historic Places
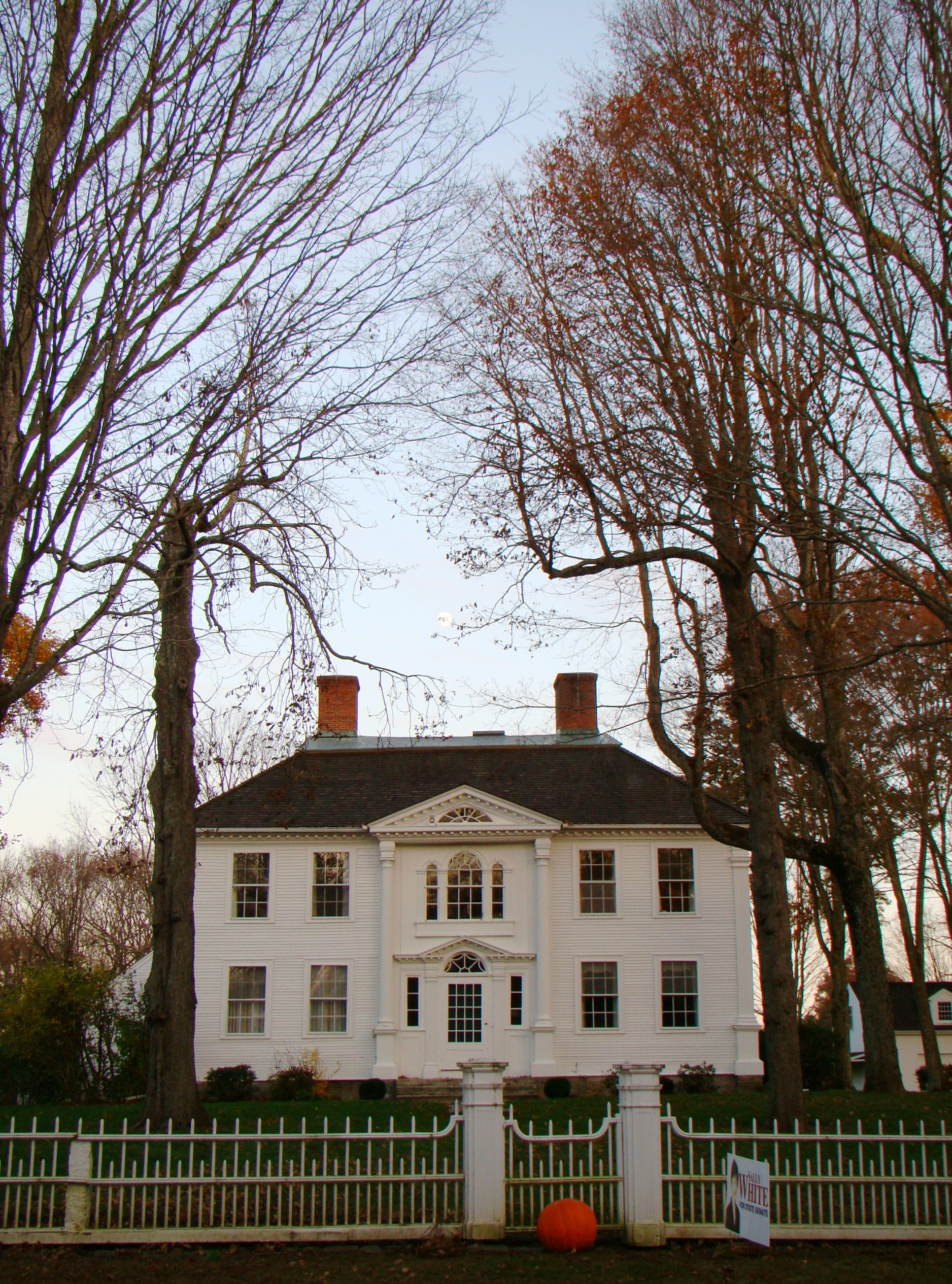

- Location within Connecticut Location within the United States
- Location: Route 169, South of Canterbury, Canterbury, Connecticut
- Coordinates: 41°39′46″N 71°58′25″W
- Area: 3 acres (1.2 ha)
- Built: c. 1790
- Architect: Dyer
- Architectural style: Georgian, "Canterbury type"
- NRHP reference No.: 70000699
- Added to NRHP: October 06, 1970

The Capt. John Clark House is a historic house on the east side of Connecticut Route 169, south of Canterbury, Connecticut. This c, 1800 enlargement of an older house is a finely crafted example of a locally distinctive style known as the "Canterbury style". The house was added to the National Register of Historic Places in 1970.

== Description and history ==
The Captain John Clark House is located in a rural setting of southern Canterbury, on the east side of Connecticut 169 south of its junction with Phinney Lane. It is a two-story wood-frame structure, with a clapboarded exterior. It is distinguished by a hip roof with a balustraded center, and entrances on two facades (in this case the south and street-facing west facades) both of which are framed by elegant woodwork. The building corners are pilastered, its cornice and rake line are modillioned, and its western entry is sheltered by a portico supported by Doric columns, and capped by a gable at the roof line.

One historian, RIchard Dana, dates construction of this house to 1790, while others ascribe it to the early years of the 19th century. What is known is that in 1801, Captain John Clark, a ship's captain, purchased a house standing here from someone named Dyer. Either Clark or Dyer was responsible for bringing the house, an older 18th century construction, to its present appearance; the balance of historical opinion seeming to favor Clark, who is also generally credited with construction of the nearby Prudence Crandall House. The hip roof, Palladian window, and gable over the entry are all characteristics of the "Canterbury style" of Federal architecture, of which this house is a particularly good example.

== See also ==
- National Register of Historic Places listings in Windham County, Connecticut
