= Buehl House =

Historic house in Ohio, United States

- U.S. National Register of Historic Places
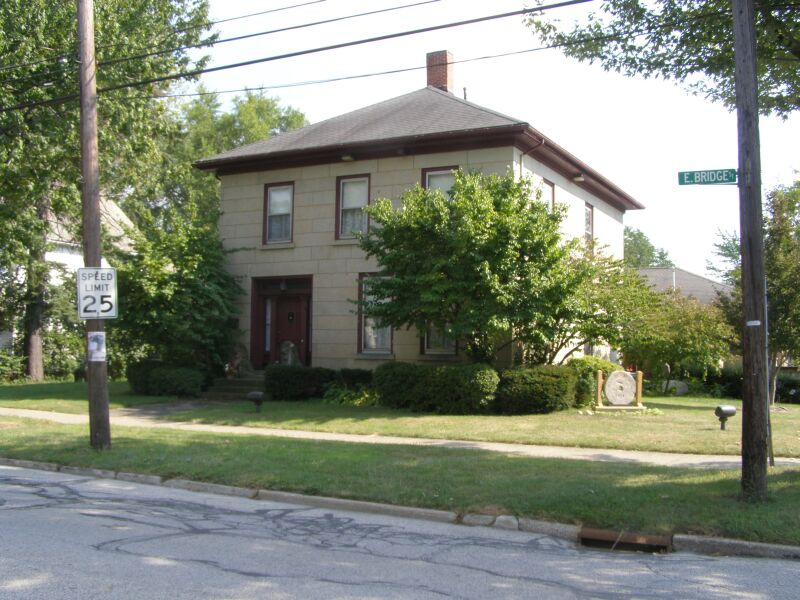

- Location within Ohio Location within the United States
- Location: 118 E. Bridge St., Berea, Ohio
- Coordinates: 41°21′58″N 81°50′59″W
- Area: less than one acre
- Built: 1859
- NRHP reference No.: 76001388
- Added to NRHP: April 30, 1976

Buehl House, also known as Dr. John Clark House, in Berea, Ohio, was built in 1859. It was listed on the National Register of Historic Places in 1976.

The Berea Historical Society operates the Mahler Museum & History Center in the house.
