= John Hector Clark House =

Historic house in North Carolina, United States

- U.S. National Register of Historic Places
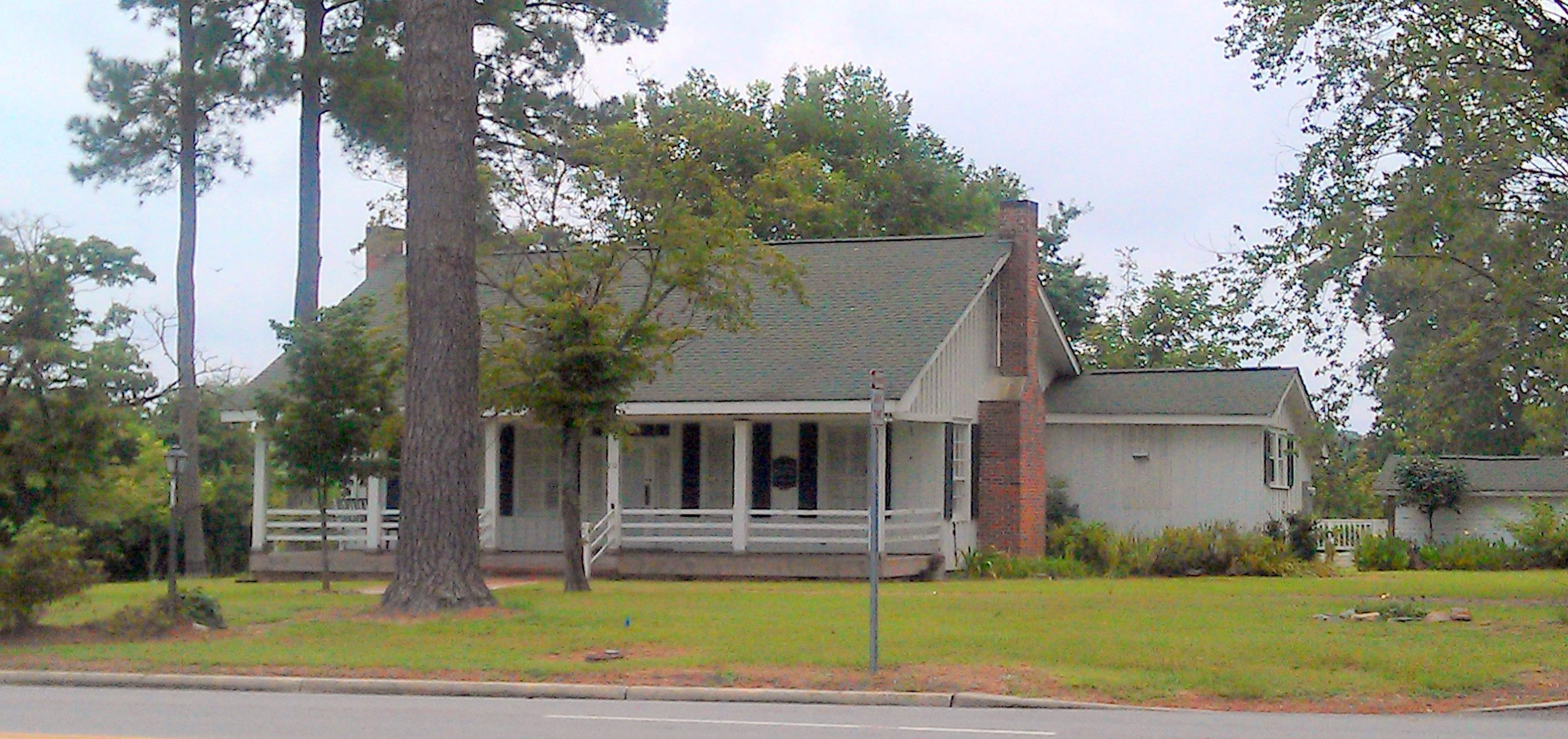
- John Hector Clark House, August 2011

- Location within North Carolina Location within the United States
- Location: SE corner jct. of S. Grove and E. Green Sts., Clarkton, North Carolina
- Coordinates: 34°29′19″N 78°39′15″W
- Area: less than one acre
- Built: c. 1865, 1928–1929, 1932
- Architectural style: Greek Revival, Coastal Cottage
- NRHP reference No.: 87000039
- Added to NRHP: May 20, 1987

John Hector Clark House is a historic home located at Clarkton, Bladen County, North Carolina. It was built about 1865, and is a one-story, board-and-batten "coastal cottage". It features a broad gable roof and full-facade engaged front porch. It was moved to the present site in 1928–1929, and realigned in 1932. The town of Clarkton is named for John Hector Clark (1821–1898).

It was added to the National Register of Historic Places in 1987.
