= Weakley–Truett–Clark House =

Historic house in Tennessee, United States

- U.S. National Register of Historic Places
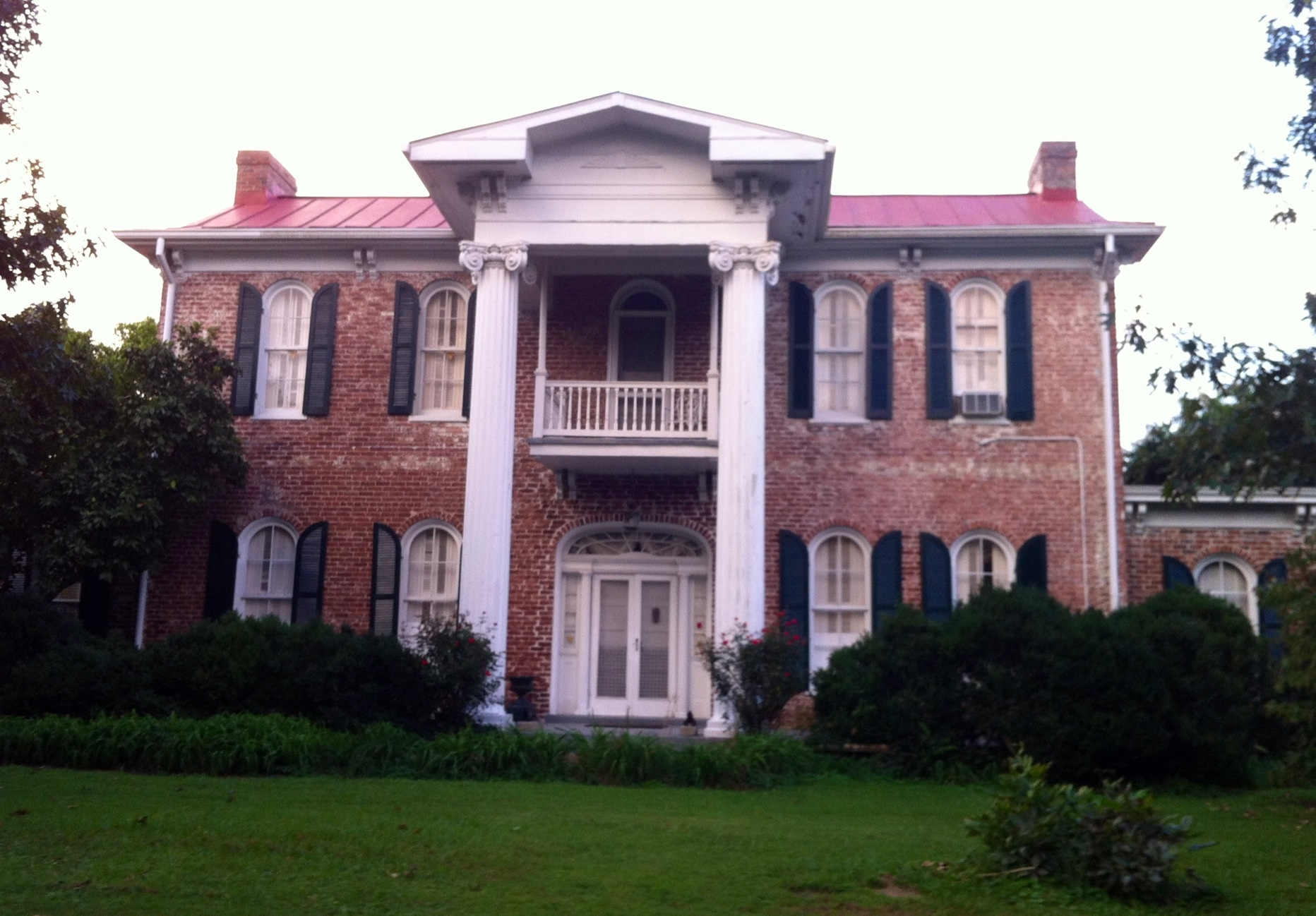

- Location within Tennessee Location within the United States
- Location: 415 Rosebank Avenue, Nashville, Tennessee, USA
- Coordinates: 36°11′10.2948″N 86°43′14.3832″W
- Area: 13 acres (5.3 ha)
- Built: 1802
- Architectural style: Classical Revival, Italianate, Federal
- NRHP reference No.: 89000297
- Added to NRHP: April 13, 1989

The Weakley–Truett–Clark House, a.k.a. Fairfax Hall, is a historic mansion in Nashville, Tennessee.

== Location ==
The house is located at 415 Rosebank Avenue in Nashville, Tennessee.

== History ==
It was built by Samuel Weakley, an early settler and surveyor, in 1802, in the Federal architectural style. It was later passed on to his brother, Robert Weakley (1764–1845), who served in the United States House of Representatives from 1809 to 1811.

In 1855, it was purchased by Ezekiel Truett, who changed the architectural style to Italianate and classical. The two-story portico with columns were added then. He also established Rosebank Nurseries, one of the oldest nurseries in the South. Later, Rosebank Avenue got its name from the roses he grew.

In 1933, a businessman named Sheffield Clark inherited the house. In 1936–1937, he added bathrooms and two one-story wings. On his mantelpieces, he displayed Civil War memorabilia.

In 1989, a Vanderbilt Professor, Henry Teloh, and his wife, Mary, purchased the house, and continued the care and restoration of it. The Teloh family did extensive restoration of the house after it was heavily damaged by the April, 1998 F-4 Tornado that hit Nashville. Sally Teloh Lott, and her husband, Lee Lott, still own the house as of 2021.

== Heritage significance ==
The house has been listed on the National Register of Historic Places listings in Davidson County, Tennessee since April 13, 1989.
