= Jonathan Clark House =

Historic house in Wisconsin, United States

- U.S. National Register of Historic Places
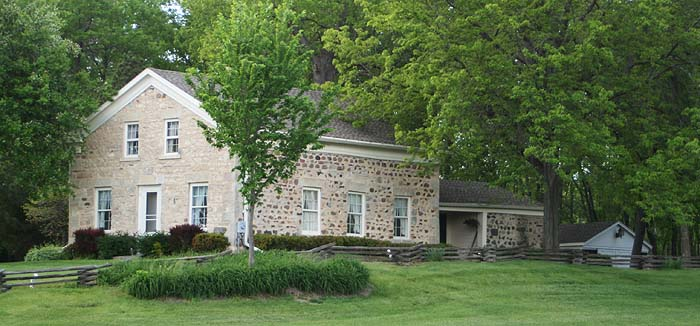

- Location within Wisconsin Location within the United States
- Location: 13615 N. Cedarburg Rd., Mequon, Wisconsin
- Coordinates: 43°15′57″N 87°59′23″W
- Area: less than one acre
- Built: 1848
- Built by: Jonathan Clark
- Architectural style: Greek Revival
- NRHP reference No.: 82000692
- Added to NRHP: June 2, 1982

The Jonathan Clark House is a historic house located at 13615 N. Cedarburg Rd. in Mequon, Wisconsin. The house was built in 1848 for Jonathan Clark, who migrated to the area from Vermont. The home was built in the Greek Revival style and is built in fieldstone with a limestone front. The house has also been used as a dentist's office.

The house has been opened to the public as a historic house museum.

The house was added to the National Register of Historic Places on June 2, 1982.
