= Lake Waccamaw, North Carolina =

- Town
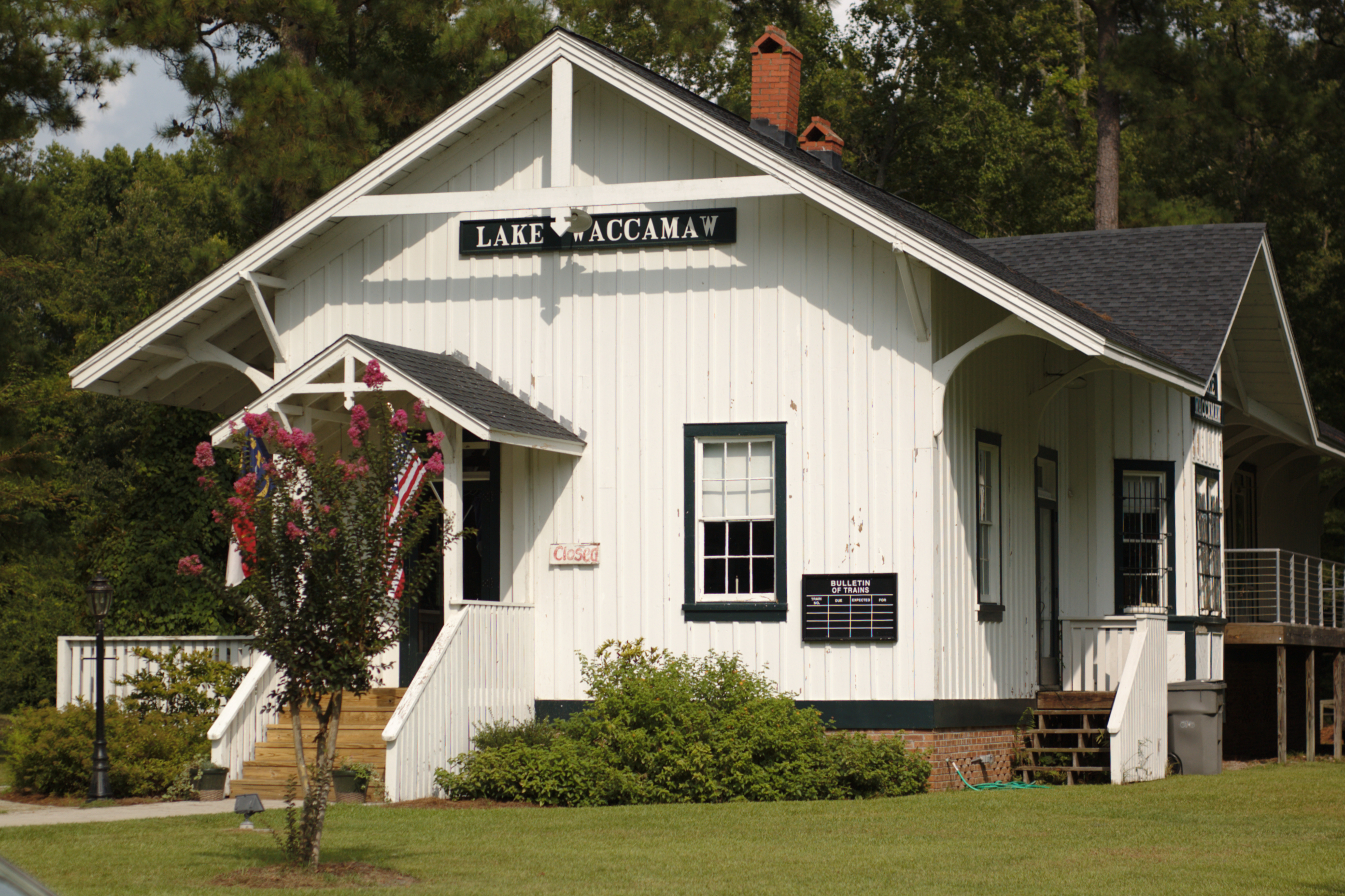
- Lake Waccamaw Depot Museum

- Seal

- Location within the state of North Carolina
- Coordinates: 34°18′50″N 78°30′42″W
- Country: United States
- State: North Carolina
- County: Columbus

Area
  - Total: 2.78 sq mi (7.20 km^{2})
  - Land: 2.78 sq mi (7.20 km^{2})
  - Water: 0 sq mi (0.00 km^{2})
- Elevation: 56 ft (17 m)

Population (2020)
  - Total: 1,296
  - Density: 466.1/sq mi (179.98/km^{2})
- Time zone: UTC-5 (Eastern (EST))
  - Summer (DST): UTC-4 (EDT)
- ZIP code: 28450
- Area codes: 910, 472
- FIPS code: 37-36640
- GNIS feature ID: 2405979
- Website: www.lakewaccamawnc.gov

Lake Waccamaw is a town in Columbus County, North Carolina, United States. The population was 1,296 at the 2020 census. European settlers established their first settlements at Lake Waccamaw in the 18th century. Following their settlement and later establishment of naval stores, the discovery of turpentine oil led to the Wilmington-Manchester railroad track's creation. A shingle company was later converted to a lumber company. In 1910, a group of townspeople created the Waccamaw Club.

The town surrounds Lake Waccamaw, which features 9,000 acres of diverse wildlife and is a major source of revenue for the town. The lake is bustling with many endemic species of fish, birds, mollusks, and other animals. In 2018, a forty-year ban on hunting alligators was lifted, allowing just one season before it was banned again for safety concerns. The town of Lake Waccamaw provides many recreational activities, such as birdwatching and hiking, due to the large population of wildlife and mild terrain.

== History ==
Charles the Second of England granted proprietors individual grants to allow them to sail to the new world to bring him back riches and news. By the mid-eighteenth century, Lake Waccamaw’s settler population had increased. People like John Powell, from Virginia, brought cattle. John Powell's son Absalom Powell started to buy land near Lake Waccamaw. John Powell's other son Issac Powell was made the first major of the Brandon, County Durham militia in 1804 and justice of peace in 1806. Issac owned most of Lake Waccamaw.

Lake Waccamaw and nearby city Flemington grew slowly with the help of the Wilmington-Manchester railroad being built. The railroad brought the rural town access to the world. The addition of the railroad also made the settlement grow when the actual freshwater lake was then discovered. However, this growth increased rapidly when the naval stores and turpentine business began to grow.

On January 26, 1869, Charles Oscar Beers started his shingle industry along the southern shore of Lake Waccamaw. Another company also started south of the lake by Henry Bascom Short after Beers started his company. These two companies came together and formed a new company named Short and Beers, which brought more business to the town and created more jobs. Over time, the company went from producing shingles to becoming the North Carolina Lumber Company.

Around 1910, a local group formed the Waccamaw Club. The club served as a gathering place for hunting parties and house parties. The club later disbanded, and the building then became the Waccamaw Hotel. The Lake Waccamaw Depot was listed on the National Register of Historic Places in 1983.

The Waccamaw Dam was built in 1926 by the state to prevent the lake from shrinking in dry weather. In 2018, a new bridge that goes over the Waccamaw Dam was finally finished and open for locals.

== Geography ==
The town of Lake Waccamaw is located in eastern Columbus County on the north shore of Lake Waccamaw. According to the United States Census Bureau, the town has a total area of 3.5 square miles (9.1 km^{2}), of which 0.004 square miles (0.01 km^{2}), or 0.16%, is water.

Lake Waccamaw is a 9,000-acre (3,600 ha) freshwater lake around and on which is held the annual free fitness event, Take the Lake. Participants may either walk the 15 miles (24 km) around the lake, paddle 14 miles (23 km) around, bike 12 miles (19 km) and walk 3 miles (5 km) around, or swim 4 miles (6 km) across the lake, all on Labor Day weekend. No winners are announced, as awards are presented for completion only. Organizers began Take the Lake in reaction to the county being ranked as the least healthy of all 100 North Carolina counties.

== Demographics ==
Historical population
| Census | Pop. | Note | %± |
|---|---|---|---|
| 1920 | 237 | | — |
| 1930 | 405 | | 70.9% |
| 1940 | 429 | | 5.9% |
| 1950 | 575 | | 34.0% |
| 1960 | 780 | | 35.7% |
| 1970 | 924 | | 18.5% |
| 1980 | 1,133 | | 22.6% |
| 1990 | 954 | | −15.8% |
| 2000 | 1,411 | | 47.9% |
| 2010 | 1,480 | | 4.9% |
| 2020 | 1,296 | | −12.4% |
U.S. Decennial Census

=== 2020 census ===
Lake Waccamaw racial composition
| Race | Number | Percentage |
|---|---|---|
| White (non-Hispanic) | 1,071 | 82.64% |
| Black or African American (non-Hispanic) | 119 | 9.18% |
| Native American | 43 | 3.32% |
| Asian | 10 | 0.77% |
| Other/Mixed | 38 | 2.93% |
| Hispanic or Latino | 15 | 1.16% |

As of the 2020 United States census, there were 1,296 people, 654 households, and 443 families residing in the town.

=== 2000 census ===
As of the census of 2000, there were 1,411 people, 529 households, and 356 families residing in the town. The population density was 409.8 inhabitants per square mile (158.2/km^{2}). There were 793 housing units at an average density of 230.3 per square mile (88.9/km^{2}). The racial makeup of the town was 80.65% White, 15.88% African American, 2.27% Native American, 0.07% Asian, 0.57% from other races, and 0.57% from two or more races. Hispanic or Latino of any race were 0.64% of the population.

There were 529 households, out of which 23.6% had children under the age of 18 living with them, 55.4% were married couples living together, 9.8% had a female householder with no husband present, and 32.7% were non-families. 30.2% of all households were made up of individuals, and 13.4% had someone living alone who was 65 years of age or older.

As of the census of 2017, there were 1,480 people and 1,015 households in Lake Waccamaw, NC. The median price for a housing unit is 252,900.

The largest racial group of the town is White at 83.8%. The next largest group is African American at 9.2%, followed by Native American at 5.4%. The remaining 1.2% of the population are from other races, and 1.0% from two or more races. Mixed Hispanic or Latino citizens make up 1.6% of the population. Those who identify as female make up 56.9% of the population, whereas males make up 43.1%. Men also have a higher median income than women at $32,969 per year compared to $19,250. The median household income for this area is $50,345, according to American Community Survey in 2017. A fifth of these people (22.3%) live below the poverty line.

According to the United States Census Bureau, there were 55,936 people living in Columbus County, North Carolina in 2017. There are 22,462 households, and 26,305 housing units in Columbus County. Of these households, 23.1% of the population lives in poverty. As of the 2017 data, 63% of the population identifies as white (alone,) and 30.7 of the population identifies as African American.

== Government ==
Lake Waccamaw is governed by a town council which consists of a mayor and a town board. The mayor of Lake Waccamaw, Matt Wilson is supported by the town board, consisting of commissioners Karl Bracey, Frank Carroll, Theresa Mckeithan, and Terry Littrell. Lake Waccamaw has a government staff led by Town Manager Damon Kempski that aids the town with development, construction, economics, and local law. Lake Waccamaw has its own police department, managed by Chief of Police C. Finch, and fire department, led by fire Chief Jerry Gore. Public Works is under the supervision of Kevin Powell

== Ecology ==
Lake Waccamaw, North Carolina is home Lake Waccamaw, a state park and wildlife refuge. The majority of Lake Waccamaw's revenue comes from tourism and tours around the park, as well as research projects conducted on the Lake's endemic species. A wide range of animal species resides in the town of Lake Waccamaw, due to the town being right next to the lake. For having a high pH and alkalinity, Lake Waccamaw is one of the few lakes that can harbor endemic species, which are species only native to one graphic region.

Red-Cockaded Woodpeckers, Swallow-Tailed Kites, and Black Bears are animal species that take refuge on land in Lake Waccamaw State Park. The Red-Cockaded Woodpeckers population has shrunk a measurable amount due to timber harvesting and the maturing of the pine forest that neighbor the lake. The Swallow-Tailed Kite population is the most dense in the town of Lake Waccamaw than in the entire state of North Carolina. Black bears roam the town area and the forest of Lake Waccamaw. The forest are a perfect environment for them because of the opportunity for den sites, food, and coverage from the weather. Brown-headed nuthatches, parula warblers, and white-eyed vireos are also other bird species that inhabit the town and its surroundings.

Aquatic life is very diverse in Lake Waccamaw. There are many fish species the Waccamaw Darter, the Waccamaw Killfish, and the Waccamaw Silverside. Alligators are part of the ecosystem of Lake Waccamaw. There was an uplift on a ban on alligator hunting in March 2018. The ban was removed after being enforced for over 40 years. The reason for the ban was that the alligators were getting over hunted, but now the population is back to normal. Bullfrogs, leopard frogs, and cricket frogs roam the damp environments around Lake Waccamaw. The Waccamaw fatmucket and Waccamaw Spike, which are mollusks, is a prominent in the filtration of the water in the lake. The Venus-hair fern, green-fly orchid, seven-angled pipewort, Narrowleaf yellow pond lily, and water arrowhead are native plants of town Lake Waccamaw. These are considered rare. In 2012, residents reported, and researchers at N.C. State University confirmed, that the invasive aquatic weed hydrilla had infested 600 acres (240 ha) of Lake Waccamaw. There are two known endemic snail species, the Waccamaw amnicola and the Waccamaw Siltsnail.

The terrain of the town is also very diverse with forested wetlands, tidal marshes, and longleaf pine forests. The tidal marshes filter pollution of the water and in the 18th and 19th, was used for rice farming. The longleaf pine forest are home to the birds, bears, deer, and other animals the reside in the area of Lake Waccamaw. Prescribed burning is used to keep the growth of the forest under control. Forested wetlands are critical in reducing the risk of flooding and shelter for all organisms. They provide opportunities for feeding on these organisms when the water rises.

== Lake Waccamaw ==
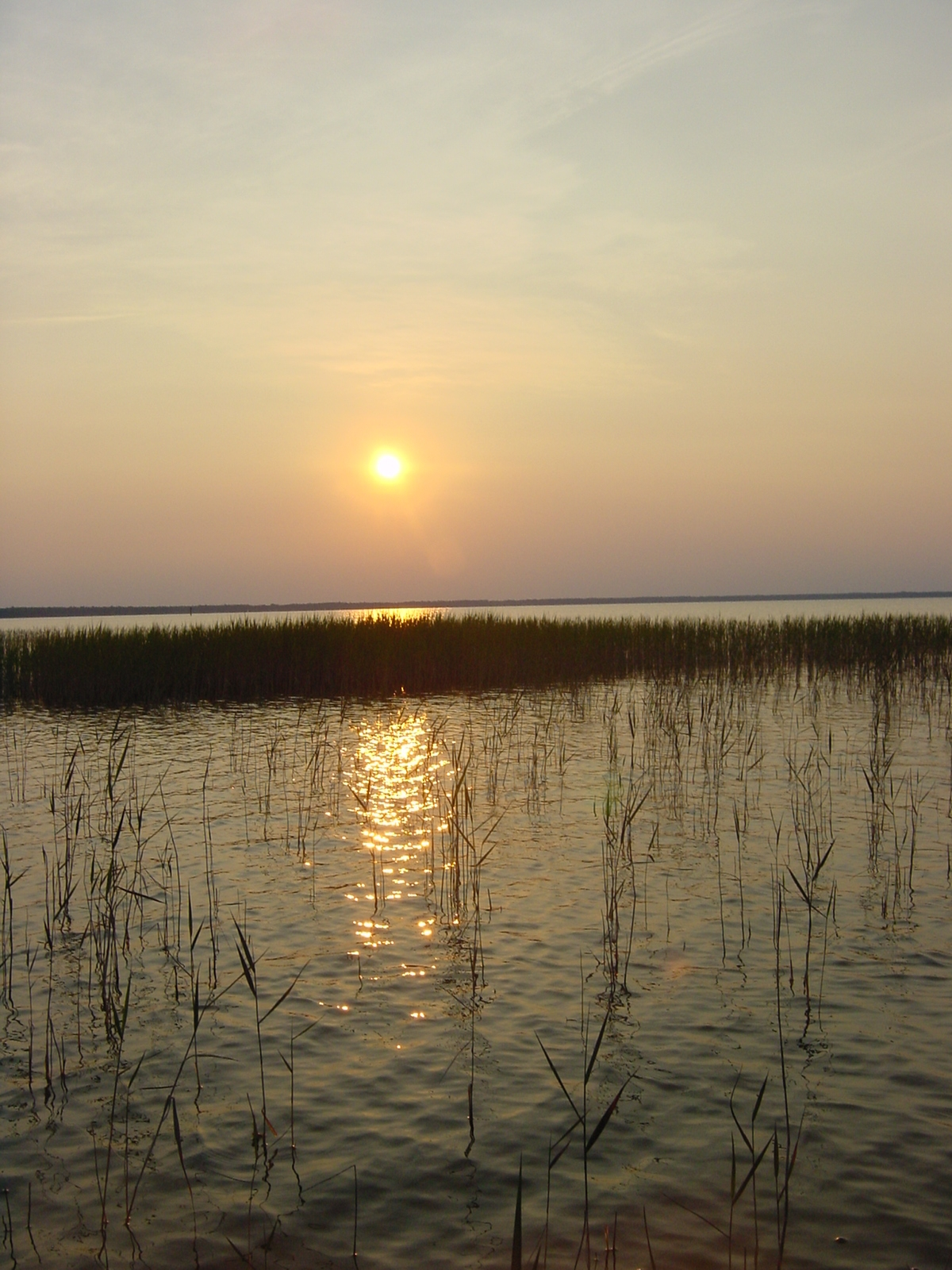
Grassy Beds at Lake Waccamaw - Photo by Joey Nobles

Lake Waccamaw is home to North Carolina's largest natural freshwater lake, and the largest of the North Carolina Bay Lakes at 8,938 acres. Lake Waccamaw is called a Bay Lake not because it is a body of water, but because of the abundance of Sweet Bay, and Red Bay trees growing beside the shore. The lake is roughly 5.2 miles by 3.5 miles in length and is estimated to be between 10,000 and 15,000 years old. Numerous other bodies of water feed into Lake Waccamaw including the Waccamaw River, and four smaller creeks, the largest of which is called Big Creek. Lake Waccamaw also has an unusually high PH level is due to an abundance of calcareous formations that underline the bottom of the lake, and have dissolved into Lake Waccamaw over time. These formations have caused steep bluffs on the north shore of the lake where the calcareous mixture is deposited. These calcareous formations do underlie most North Carolinian Lakes, but Lake Waccamaw is the only Bay Lake with these formations.

Lake Waccamaw has many recreation activities available as visitors can camp, fish, hunt, go boating, or picnic. With seven miles of trails to explore, and fifty-two species of game and non-game fish, there is plenty for visitors to do and experience. One of the most popular places to visit and fish at is the Bohemian Girl Scenic Bridge, named in honor of John A McNeil, a celebrated citizen. The bridge completes a 14-mile path around the lake, and has numerous fishing platforms as well as a panoramic view of the lake.

== Development of the lake ==
Many scientists worry about possible contamination of the lake. Lake Waccamaw's water is within the acceptable, pre-established heath guidelines and legal limits established by the Safe Drinking Water Act. However, there is a high level of chloroform present in the Lake, at 4.43 ppb (parts per billion) out of an allowed 14 ppb. Chloroform is a Trihalomethane that is often used as a fumigant for wheat products, a coolant, and as a cleaning spot remover. Chloroform is a naturally occurring substance, but its presence in water is almost always man-made. The lake itself is not man made, as it is a part of the Bladen Lake group, a group known as the Bay Lakes; these are lakes created by receding ocean waters.

== Education ==
East Columbus Junior-Senior High School is located at 32 Gator Lane, Lake Waccamaw. Founded in 1992, East Columbus Junior-Senior High School receives students from the Lake Waccamaw, Riegelwood, Delco, and Hallsboro residential areas. It incorporates students from the Acme-Delco and Hallsboro Middle Schools. The school has a total of 449 students enrolled with a 14-1 student to teacher ratio. East Columbus Junior-Senior High School has a graduation rate of 85 percent. The school's mascot is the Gator. Professional basketball player Boubacar Aw attended his senior year of high school at East Columbus.

Lake Waccamaw has a charter school called Thomas Academy. Thomas Academy is partnered with the Boy and Girls Homes of North Carolina. Thomas Academy has a total of 83 students enrolled with a 6:11 student to teacher ratio. It serves grades from 6–12 with a graduation rate of 79 percent. The Boys and Girls Homes of North Carolina is the only private boarding school in the county. The Boys and Girls Homes of North Carolina is a private boarding school that strives to provide a good education for students age of 6–21 years old who have experienced trauma or been victims of violence. Lake Waccamaw doesn't have any elementary schools, but Columbus County does offer one elementary school, Hallsboro Artesia Elementary School, in Hallsboro. The closest college near Lake Waccamaw is called Southeastern Community College which is only 15 miles away from the town.

== Waccamaw Siouans ==
The Waccamaw Sioux or Waccamaw Siouan are one of eight Indian tribes recognized by the North Carolinian government. The Waccamaw Siouan Indians are not affiliated with the Waccamaw People of North Carolina or the Waccamaw Siouan of Farmers Union, South Carolina. The Lake Waccamaw Native Americans are known as the "People of the Falling Star" because of the belief that a meteorite crashed to Earth years ago and created the crater that is now Lake Waccamaw. The Waccamaw Siouan live on the edge of the Green Swamp in a closed, protected swampland refuge. The Waccamaw Siouans were originally called the Waccon and then the Waccammassus Indians, but their name was changed to Waccamaw by white settlers as it was more convenient and easy for English settlers to pronounce.

== Bibliography ==
- Burge, Erin J.; King, Stanley D. (January 2015). "Parasites of the Carolina Bay Lake-Endemic Fundulus waccamensis (Waccamaw Killifish)". Southeastern Naturalist. 14 (1): 197–212. doi:10.1656/058.014.0115. S2CID 84310250.
- CAHOON, LAWRENCE B.; KUCKLICK, JOHN R.; KIEFER, RUDI H.; WILLEY, JOAN D. (1993). "The Effects of Chemical Weathering on Limestone Dissolution and Phosphate Release into Lake Waccamaw, North Carolina". Journal of the Elisha Mitchell Scientific Society. 109 (3): 123–134. JSTOR 24335294.
- STAGER, J. C.; CAHOON, L. B. (1987). "The Age and Trophic History of Lake Waccamaw, North Carolina". Journal of the Elisha Mitchell Scientific Society. 103 (1): 1–13. JSTOR 24333337.
- "Chloroform." Wisconsin Department of Health Services, //www.dhs.wisconsin.gov/chemical/chloroform.htm, March 23, 2019
- Environmental Working Group; "Town of Lake Waccamaw Water System." NYTimes.com. May 6, 2012.//www.nytimes.com/interactive/projects/toxic-waters/contaminants/nc/columbus/nc0424045-lake-waccamaw-town-of/index.html March 21, 2019
- Gant, Michelle. "North Carolina Town to Approve Alligator Hunting over 40 Years after It Was Banned." Fox News, FOX News Network, April 27, 2017, www.foxnews.com/great-outdoors/north-Carolina-town-to-approve-alligator-hunting-over-40-years-after-it-was-banned.
- Howell, Nathan; Krings, Alexander; Braham, Richard (April 5, 2016). "Guide to the littoral zone vascular flora of Carolina bay lakes (U.S.A.)". Biodiversity Data Journal. 4 (4): e7964–1. doi:10.3897/BDJ.4.e7964. PMC 4911545. PMID 27350764.
- "How Does Flemington Academy Rank Among America's Best High Schools?" U.S. News & World Report, U.S. News & World Report, www.usnews.com/education/best-high-schools/north-Carolina/districts/flemington-academy/flemington-academy-144826. Accessed April 11, 2019.
- "How Does East Columbus High Rank Among America's Best High Schools?" U.S. News & World Report, U.S. News & World Report, www.usnews.com/education/best-high-schools/north-Carolina/districts/columbus-county-schools/east-columbus-high-14364. Accessed April 11, 2019.
- Krabbenhoft, Trevor J.; Rohde, Fred C.; Quattro, Joseph M. (January 2009). "Threatened fishes of the world: Fundulus waccamensis (Hubbs and Raney, 1946) (Fundulidae)". Environmental Biology of Fishes. 84 (2): 173–174. doi:10.1007/s10641-008-9401-3. S2CID 30575442.
- Lake Waccamaw State Park. "Ecology." Ncparks.gov. North Carolina Division of Parks and Recreation, n.d. Web. March 26, 2019. //www.ncparks.gov/lake-waccamaw-state-park/ecology.
- "Lake Waccamaw Depot Museum." Lake Waccamaw Depot Museum - Gallery, www.lakewaccamawdepotmuseum.com/gallery.htm. Accessed April 3, 2019.
- McCartney, Michael A.; Bogan, Arthur E.; Sommer, Kristine M.; Wilbur, Ami E. (December 2016). "Phylogenetic Analysis of Lake Waccamaw Endemic Freshwater Mussel Species". American Malacological Bulletin. 34 (2): 109–120. doi:10.4003/006.034.0207. S2CID 90395424.
- North Carolina Wildlife Resources Commission. "Waccamaw Fatmucket." Waccamaw Fatmucket, 2019, www.ncwildlife.org/Learning/Species/Mollusks/Waccamaw-Fatmucket#3331996-description.
- Parkins, Grant. "Lake Waccamaw: A North Carolina Treasure." Lake Waccamaw: A North Carolina Treasure |, December 12, 2017, lakelevel.web.unc.edu/lake-waccamaw-a-north-Carolina-treasure/. Accessed March 16, 2019.
- Peek, Charlie. "Treatment of Lake Waccamaw for Hydrilla Infestation Set to Begin." Treatment of Lake Waccamaw for Hydrilla Infestation Set to Begin | NC State Parks, May 29, 2013, www.ncparks.gov/newsroom/press-releases/treatment-of-lake-waccamaw-hydrilla-infestation-set-begin.
- Powell, Bobby, and Susan Prescott. "History." Town of Lake Waccamaw, lakewaccamaw.com/?page_id=37. Accessed March 16, 2019.
- Powell, William. "Carolina Bays." NCpedia, 2006, www.ncpedia.org/Carolina-bays. Accessed March 17, 2019.
- The Gale Group Inc. "Endemic Species." Environmental Encyclopedia, Encyclopedia.com, 2019, www.encyclopedia.com/environment/encyclopedias-almanacs-transcripts-and-maps/endemic-species.
- "The Waccamaw River - The River That Comes and Goes." Carolina Rivers..Education, Preservation through Exploration, www.carolinarivers.com/pages/waccamaw.htm. Accessed March 15, 2019.
- "Town Council." Town of Lake Waccamaw, lakewaccamawnc.gov/?page_id=36. Accessed April 11, 2019
- Tribe, Waccamaw Siouan. " Waccamaw Siouan Indians." Waccamaw Siouan Tribe. Accessed April 12, 2019
- U.S. Fish & Wildlife Service. "Wildlife and Habitat - Waccamaw - U.S. Fish and Wildlife Service." Waccamaw, December 10, 2015, www.fws.gov/refuge/waccamaw/wildlife_and_habitat.html.
