= Waccamaw (disambiguation) =

The Waccamaw were a Native American tribe of South Carolina.

Waccamaw may also refer to:

- Waccamaw Indian People, formerly the Chicora-Waccamaw Indian People, a state-recognized tribe
- Waccamaw language
- Waccamaw Siouan Indians, a Native American Tribe of North Carolina
- Waccamaw Corp., a former home furnishings retailer
- Waccamaw River, which drains the lake
- Lake Waccamaw, a lake in North Carolina
- USS Waccamaw (AO-109), a United States Navy vessel
- Waccamaw Neck, peninsula between the Atlantic Ocean and the Waccamaw River in Georgetown County, South Carolina
- Waccamaw Formation, geologic formation in southeastern North Carolina and eastern South Carolina
- Waccamaw High School, school of Georgetown County, South Carolina
- Waccamaw darter (Etheostoma perlongum), species of freshwater ray-finned fish
- Waccamaw killifish (Fundulus waccamensis), species of fish in the family Fundulidae
- Waccamaw silverside (Menidia extensa), species of fish in the family Atherinopsidae
- Waccamaw National Wildlife Refuge
- Waccamaw Coast Line Railroad, railroad division of the Baltimore and Annapolis Railroad
