= Hallsboro, North Carolina =

- Census-designated place
- Location in North Carolina Hallsboro (the United States)
- Coordinates: 34°19′08″N 78°35′36″W
- Country: United States
- State: North Carolina
- County: Columbus

Area
  - Total: 3.28 sq mi (8.49 km^{2})
  - Land: 3.28 sq mi (8.49 km^{2})
  - Water: 0 sq mi (0.00 km^{2})
- Elevation: 52 ft (16 m)

Population (2020)
  - Total: 382
  - Density: 116.6/sq mi (45.01/km^{2})
- Time zone: UTC-5 (Eastern (EST))
  - Summer (DST): UTC-4 (EDT)
- ZIP code: 28442
- Area codes: 910, 472
- FIPS code: 37-29000
- GNIS feature ID: 2628631

Hallsboro is an unincorporated community and census-designated place (CDP) in Columbus County, in southeastern North Carolina, United States. As of the 2020 census, Hallsboro had a population of 382.

== Education ==
Hallsboro has an elementary school and middle school. For high school, students must travel to East Columbus Jr./Sr High School at Lake Waccamaw, about 5 miles to the east. There are no libraries in Hallsboro; the closest is the Rube McCray Memorial Library 5.3 miles (8.5 km) away at Lake Waccamaw.

== Geography ==
Hallsboro is located in east-central Columbus County.

According to the U.S. Census Bureau, the Hallsboro CDP has an area of 3.3 square miles (8.5 km^{2}), all land.

Surrounding communities include Lake Waccamaw 5 miles (8 km) to the east, Whiteville, the Columbus County seat, 6 miles (10 km) to the west, Bolton 11 miles (18 km) to the east, and Clarkton 13 miles (21 km) to the north.

== Demographics ==
Historical population
Census	Pop.	Note	%±
2020	382		—
U.S. Decennial Census

== Local parks and attractions ==
Lake Waccamaw State Park is located on the far side of Lake Waccamaw, 9 miles (14 km) southeast of Hallsboro.

== Notable person ==
- Ann Atwater, born in Hallsboro, became a civil rights activist in Durham, North Carolina, working especially with Operation Breakthrough
