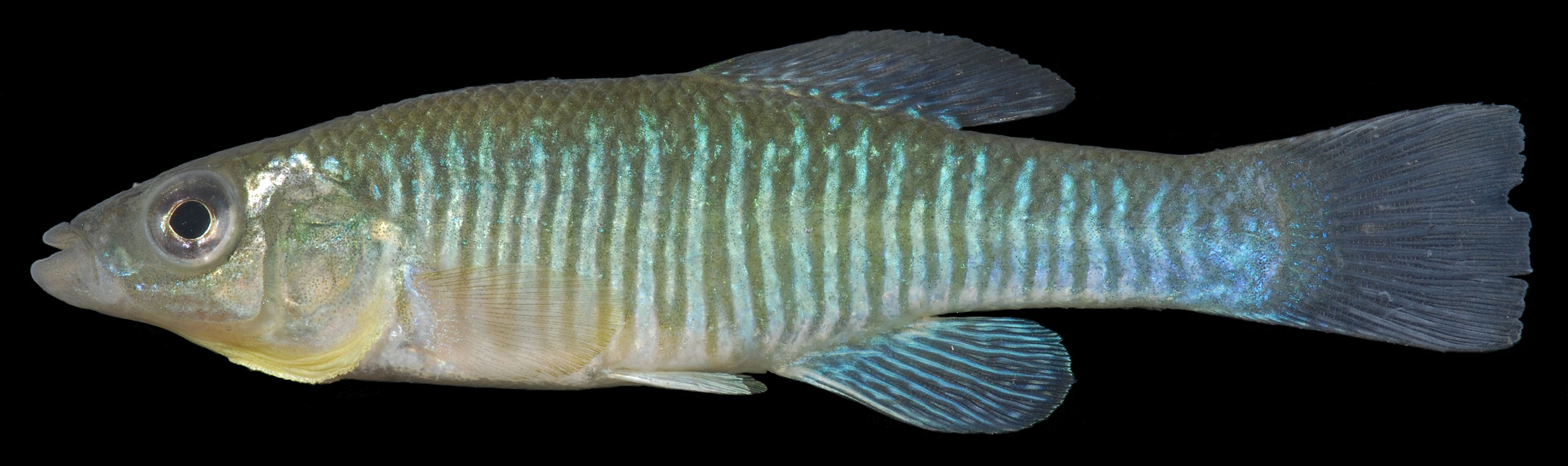

Conservation status
- Least Concern (IUCN 3.1)

- Secure (NatureServe)

Scientific classification
- Kingdom: Animalia
- Phylum: Chordata
- Class: Actinopterygii
- Division: Teleostei
- Order: Cyprinodontiformes
- Family: Fundulidae
- Genus: Fundulus
- Species: F. diaphanus

Binomial name
- Fundulus diaphanus (Lesueur, 1817)

Subspecies
- F. d. diaphanus; F. d. menona D. S. Jordan & Copeland, 1877
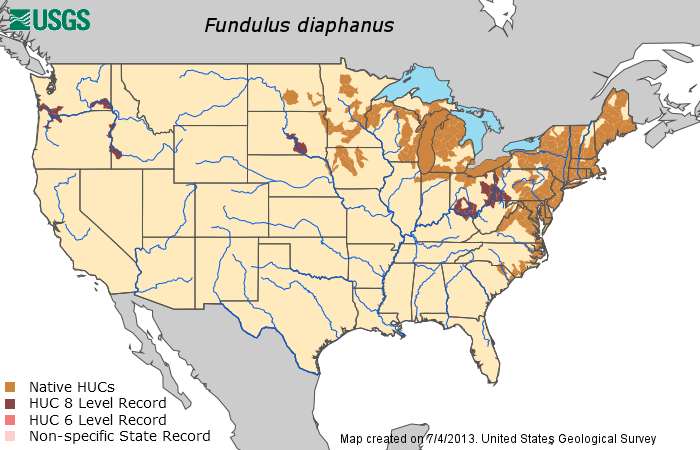
- Range of the banded killifish

Synonyms
- Hydrargira diaphana Lesueur, 1817; Hydrargira multifaciata Lesueur, 1817; Fundulus multifaciatus (Lesueur, 1817); Fundulus menona Jordan & Copeland, 1877; Fundulus extensus Jordan & Gilbert, 1882

= Banded killifish =

Species of fish

The banded killifish (Fundulus diaphanus) is a North American species of temperate freshwater killifish belonging to the genus Fundulus of the family Fundulidae. Its natural geographic range extends from Newfoundland to South Carolina, and west to Minnesota, including the Great Lakes drainages. This species is the only freshwater killifish found in the northeastern United States. While it is primarily a freshwater species, it can occasionally be found in brackish water.

== Etymology ==
The common name, "banded killifish", commonly refers to the distinct black and white vertical bandings found along their sides. The Latin genus name Fundulus is the diminutive of fundus, which means "bottom", and the specific name diaphanus means "transparent" in Greek.

== Description ==
The banded killifish has a narrow, elongate bluish-gray or olive-colored body with a darker dorsal surface and white or yellowish underparts extending to the anal fin. Spawning males develop yellow pectoral and pelvic fins, a bright blue patch on the anal fin, and brilliant blue iridescence on the lower portion of the body including the area around the anal fin. There are 12–20 vertical bands along the sides. In females the bands usually appear as thin and distinct black bands that often do not span the full width of the body. In males, the bands are silvery in color, are less distinct, and are closer together. The number of bands are useful in sexing an individual; male banded killifish have a greater (approximately >9) number of bands anterior to the dorsal fin. Fins rounded, base of first dorsal ray slightly ahead of or directly over first anal ray. Snout is blunt, with small superior mouth and projecting lower jaw. Lateral line is missing; 39–43 scales in the lateral series. There are 10 to 13 dorsal fin rays, 9 to 11 anal fin rays and 6 pelvic fin rays. Max length is 13 cm (5.1 in) total length (TL), average length is 6.3 cm (2.5 in) TL.

The eastern subspecies, F. d. diaphanus, can be differentiated from the western subspecies, F. d. menona, by the presence of a further anterior dorsal fin position, increased number of anterior bars in the males of the subspecies (9–15 compared to 5-0 for F. d. menona) with more intense bars along the side that stay intact along the anterior back, a higher number of scale rows (40–44 F. d. menona, 45–49 F. d. diaphanus), and a combined number of dorsal and anal fin rays totaling 24 to 26, compared to 23 to 24 for F. d. menona. Larger maximum sizes have been reported for F. d. diaphanus than F. d. menona.

The banded killifish is similar in habitat preference and appearance to the mummichog, Fundulus heteroclitus, and the two species have been known to interbreed where their habitat overlaps. The banded killifish, while euryhaline, is more commonly found in freshwater, whereas the mummichog primarily inhabits brackish and coastal waters. The two species can be visually identified by the difference in bands; the banded killifish has thin dark bars, while the mummichog has thin light bars. The species can also be differentiated by the thicker caudal peduncle in the mummichog and branchiostegal rays often numbering 6,6 for the banded killifish (5,5 in the mummichog). Banded killifish have larger and more numerous gill rakers compared to mummichogs (8–12 vs. 4–7, respectively).

The Waccamaw killifish, Fundulus waccamensis, is a closely related species to the banded killifish that is endemic to Lake Waccamaw, North Carolina, and its tributaries. the Waccamaw killifish differs by its slimmer profile; the ranges of the two species do not overlap.

== Range and distribution ==
The banded killifish is widely distributed throughout eastern North America, ranging from the Pee Dee River, South Carolina to Newfoundland; also found in southern Pennsylvania, northeastern Nebraska, and northern Illinois, and north to St. Lawrence-Great Lakes and Mississippi River basins from Manitoba to Quebec. The eastern subspecies is found on the Atlantic Slope, and the western subspecies in the rest of its range. Westward expansion by the eastern subspecies may be the result of introductions as bait or aquarium fish into novel waterbodies, climate change expanding favorable habitat, or a higher pollution tolerance compared to the western subspecies.

The population of banded killifish in Newfoundland was assigned a status of special concern by the Committee on the Status of Endangered Wildlife in Canada (COSEWIC) due to biogeographical isolation and limitation of potential for range expansion. In the United States, Ohio and Illinois list the western subspecies as endangered and threatened, respectively, due to range expansion of the eastern subspecies which has been documented to hybridize wherever the ranges of the subspecies overlap. As such, Ohio also classifies F. d. diaphanus as an injurious aquatic invasive species. Intergrades occur in the Saint Lawrence and Lake Erie drainages where the ranges of the two subspecies naturally come in contact.

The banded killifish has been introduced outside of its native range in the states of Idaho, Ohio, Oregon, Pennsylvania, South Dakota, Washington, and West Virginia. In Oregon and Washington, the western banded killifish is reported to be the introduced subspecies.

== Habitat and ecology ==
Adults range from 2 to 3 years in age. Banded killifish are schooling fish, usually traveling in groups of 3–6 individuals, while the juveniles travel in groups of 8–12. The fish are most often found in the shallow and quiet areas of clear lakes, ponds, rivers, and estuaries with sandy gravel or muddy bottoms and with abundant aquatic vegetation. The sand and gravel provides hatchlings and juveniles with places to hide when threatened by predatory fish such as the largemouth bass Micropterus salmoides, northern pike Esox lucius, bluegill Lepomis macrochirus, and trout. Because the banded killifish is small, it generally does not venture into deeper waters, where it would be vulnerable to predation as well as unable to swim in the fast currents. However, adult banded killifish have been observed to travel into deep bodies of water to feed. Banded killifish often congregate near aquatic vegetation, as it provides protection as well as breeding habitat.

Banded killifish are euryhaline, but they usually inhabit freshwater streams and lakes. The largest adult recorded, observed in Indian Bay, Canada, was 12.8 cm (5.0 in). People have used banded killifish as fish bait. Most people do not favor them as pets because they require a high level of maintenance and therefore do not survive well in an aquarium setting. They are important to aquatic ecosystems because they are a food source for larger fish such as largemouth bass, northern pike, and trout. They are also a food source for birds such as belted kingfisher (Megaceryle alcyon), common merganser (Mergus merganser), and herons.

In January 2005 the banded killifish was listed as a vulnerable species under the Newfoundland Labrador Endangered Species Act and the Canada Species at Risk Act (SARA) for the Newfoundland population. This species is facing habitat degradation due to industrial development, motorized watercraft activities, and removal of aquatic vegetation.

== Diet ==
Banded killifish have been observed to feed at all levels of the water column. The adults feed on a variety of items such as insects, nymphs, mollusks, turbellarians, and other small crustaceans. Mosquito larvae are also a popular food source. In contrast, the smaller individuals are limited to fewer items such as chironomid larvae, cladocerans, copepods, and midge larvae. Both young and adult banded killifish have been observed to feed mostly in the afternoon.

== Reproduction and life cycle ==
Banded killifish are commonly observed to spawn in dense aquatic vegetation because they practice external fertilization where the female lays her eggs that are equipped with adhesive threads that adhere to plants. Spawning occurs from June to mid-August in shallow waters. During the spawning season, the males go through a color change phase. They develop a bright blue patch near the anal fin. In addition, the lower portion of the body changes to a bright blue color.

Spawning occurs at water temperatures of 21 to 23 °C (70 to 73 °F). The male chooses a site in the shallow part of the water and protects it from other males. When a female appears, the male will court the female and fight with the other prospecting males. The female will emit one egg while the male pursues her. Once together, the female emits 10 eggs that falls onto the bottom or gets attached to aquatic plants in the chosen spawn area. The male will continue to pursue the female until the female have laid 50 to 100 eggs.

A single female may lay several clutches of eggs during one summer. After the eggs have been fertilized, both the parents will leave and go their separate ways; the eggs do not receive parental care. Fry (6–7 mm or 0.24–0.28 in in length) emerge within 10 to 12 days depending on the temperature of the water. They reach maturity at approximately 1 year with an average length of 6 cm (2.4 in). Banded killifish can live for a little over 2 years. However, there have been some that have been observed to live up to 3 years.

== Behavior ==
=== Shoaling behavior ===
Banded killifish form group shoals. The conditions in which shoaling occurs, the individuals who comprise the shoal, and the size of the shoal are all highly variable. Shoaling can be understood through a cost and benefit analysis. The costs and benefits of group membership are influenced by food availability and predatory risk. Bigger groups allow for better predatory protection, but are not as conducive to foraging because the food will be distributed amongst all of the group members. For smaller groups, there is not as effective predatory protection, but in regards to foraging each individual will have access to more food.

The nutritional state of banded killifish influences individual's decisions to shoal or not. Food-deprived individuals spent more time by themselves and not in shoals. When food-deprived individuals were found in shoals their shoals were not any smaller than that of a well-fed banded killifish. Hungry banded killifish are more likely to leave a shoal than a well-fed individual. In the presence of a food stimulus, group size decreases, so that each individual does not have to compete with others for access to these resources. When presented with food odour, individuals were less attracted to neighbors, but when presented with a predatory stimulus, they were more attracted to neighbors and formed tighter shoals. When in the presence of both stimuli, the group size is intermediate.

In the presence of a predatory stimulus, banded killifish decrease the amount of food attempts and duration of feeding posture. This is done to allocate more energy to predatory vigilance and avoidance. In both the presence and absence of predatory stimuli, banded killifish feeding rate for individuals is independent of shoal size. Lone individuals incur additional cost because they do not gain the improved predatory protection granted by shoal formation, and thus will attempt to join larger shoals rather than smaller shoals. When deciding whether to join a shoal or not, banded killifish value predatory protection over foraging opportunities.

==== Predator protection ====
In the presence of a predatory stimulus, shoal size increases to allow for greater protection via the dilution effect. From the dilution effect, each individual will have a lesser chance of being attacked by a predator, since there are many other individuals in the group. In a larger group, there is a larger chance that a predator will attack a different shoalmate than it will attack the individual of interest. Individuals who stray from the shoal have an increased mortality risk. This leads to selection for grouping.

Besides the dilution effect, shoaling also benefits the individual because of group vigilance. To best protect against predation, the banded killifish must be on the lookout to detect predators. In a group, each individual can spend less time looking out for predators because others in the shoal can share in this responsibility. With increasing shoal size, each individual spends less time being vigilant, but with more individuals the group increases overall vigilance and therefore benefit each individual in the shoal. When one individual detects a predator, an alarm call is made to alert the shoal, so that the individuals can act to protect themselves from predatory attack.

To improve predator avoidance, banded killifish will often take refuge. Frightened fish in the presence of a predatory stimulus will hide in a foodless refuge. This preference is modulated by individual body size. Larger individuals spend more time in the refuge than their smaller conspecifics. Smaller banded killifish individuals are more prone to risk than their larger counterparts.

==== Shoaling preferences ====
When choosing which shoals to join, banded killifish often choose to join ones that consist of others with similar phenotypes. In order to achieve this, banded killifish have shown the ability to discriminate between individuals within the species. Banded killifish distinguish individuals by body coloration phenotype. Banded killifish are likely to enter shoals with those of similar body color in order to maximize predator avoidance. An individual of different color might present as a contrast. This contrast is likely to make the shoal stand out and gain the predator's attention. Banded killifishes' level of preference for similarly colored shoalmates differs in the presence and absence of a predatory stimulus.

Banded killifish use body coloration to determine if an individual has been parasitized or not. Black spots indicate the presence of a parasite, whereas the absence of these spots indicates an unparasitized individual. Both parasitized and unparasitized individuals preferred to join unparasitized shoals. The preference for unparasitized shoals increases with an increase in parasite load of a parasitized individual.

Shoaling preferences in banded killifish differ in shoal species composition, shoal size, and individual body size within the shoal. The shift in preferences is triggered by predatory stimuli. In the presence of predatory stimuli, a banded killifish individual will prefer the bigger conspecific shoal, but only as long as the shoal is homogenous in individual fish size. If the size of individual fish were different, they would join a shoal of similarly sized fish regardless of shoal size. This preference is maintained by predatory threat. Body size is a more significant determinant of shoaling preference than shoal size and species composition.

Banded killifish have been found to engage in heterospecific shoaling with other species of killifish as well as other fish. There are many situational factors that determine if the banded killifish individual would want to engage in heterospecific shoaling. If body size is similar, then banded killifish prefer conspecific shoals as opposed to heterospecific ones. Size is a sorting mechanism for conspecific as opposed to heterospecific shoaling.
