= Lake Waccamaw station =

- Lake Waccamaw Depot
- U.S. National Register of Historic Places
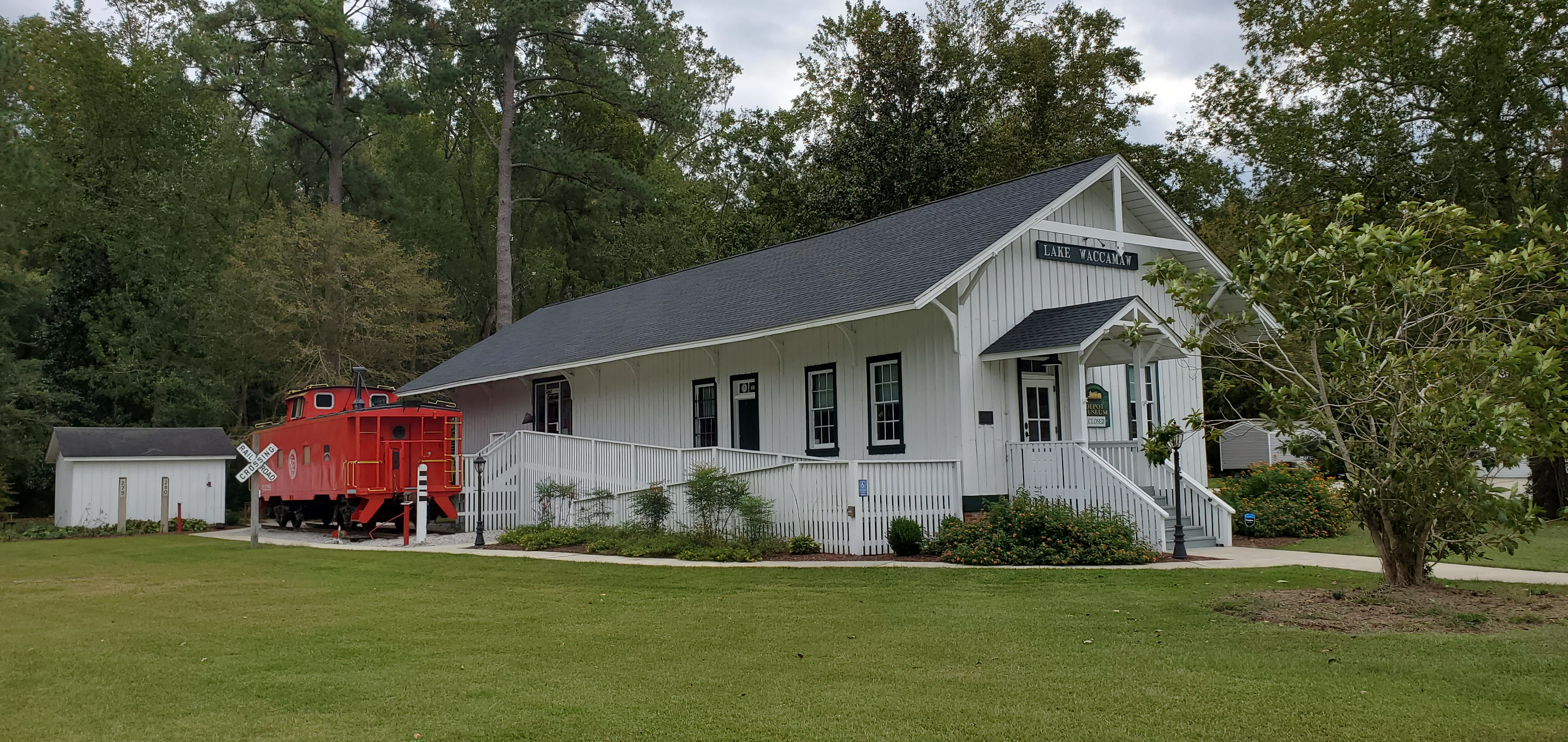

- Location within North Carolina Location within the United States
- Location: Flemington Ave., Lake Waccamaw, North Carolina
- Coordinates: 34°19′16″N 78°31′49″W
- Area: 0.5 acres (0.20 ha)
- Built: c. 1900
- Architect/builder: Herbert Smith
- Architectural style: Stick/eastlake
- NRHP reference No.: 83001842
- Added to NRHP: July 21, 1983

Lake Waccamaw Depot is a historic train station located at Lake Waccamaw, Columbus County, North Carolina It was built about 1900 by the Atlantic Coast Line Railroad, and is a one-story, Stick Style frame building with board-and-batten siding. It features shaped eave brackets, gable braces, and a long low slate covered gabled roof. The building was moved to its present location in 1974. Also on the property is the contributing a rectangular board-and-batten covered Section House.

It was listed on the National Register of Historic Places in 1983.

The depot is now operated as the Lake Waccamaw Depot Museum, with displays of local history and natural history.

Preceding station	Atlantic Coast Line Railroad	Following station
Hallsboro toward Columbia	Columbia – Wilmington	Bolton toward Wilmington
