= Bladen Lake Group =

Lakes in North Carolina, United States

The Bladen Lake Group is a group of lakes located in southeastern North Carolina. The largest, Lake Waccamaw, is the largest of the natural Carolina Bay lakes. There are several lakes included in this group, and all are water-filled Carolina Bays. All of the lakes are oval and oriented in the same direction, a feature common to the Carolina Bays.

This group of lakes is characterized as being relatively unproductive.
