= Carolina bays =

Elliptical depressions concentrated along the Atlantic seaboard of North America

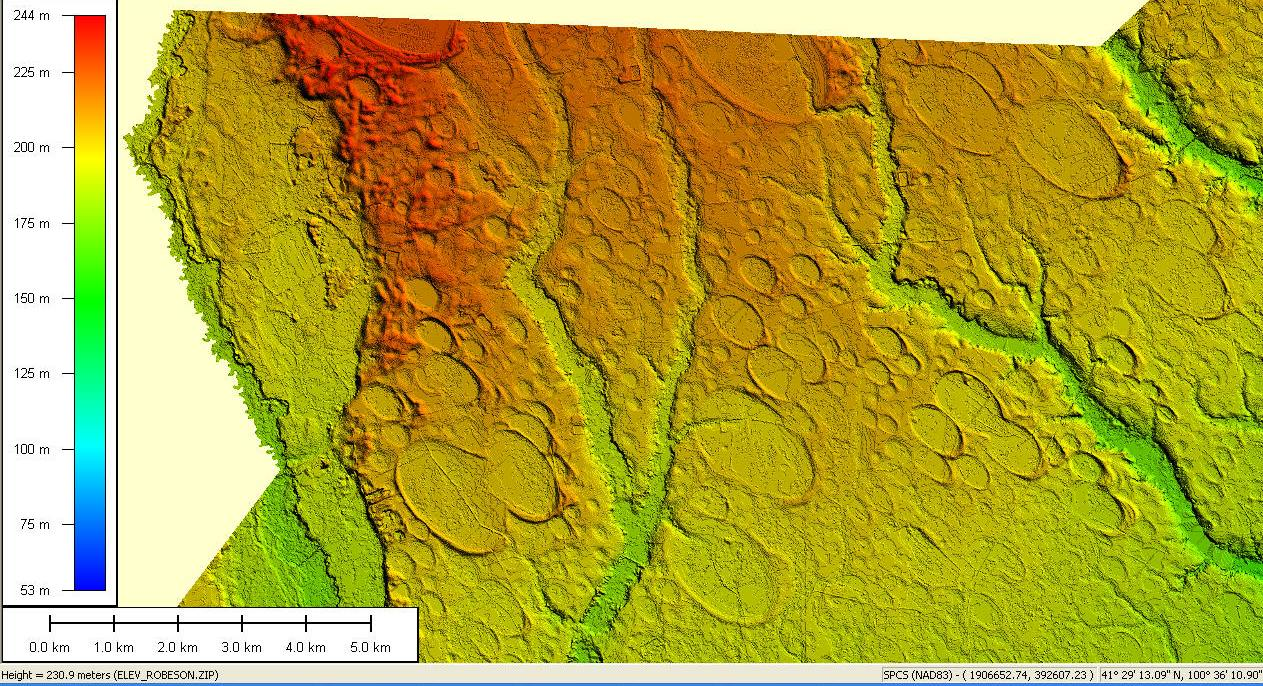
LIDAR elevation image of 300 square miles (800 km^{2}) of Carolina bays in Robeson County, North Carolina

Carolina bays, also regionally known as Maryland basins and Delmarva bays, are elliptical to circular depressions concentrated along the East Coast of the United States from New York to north Florida. There is no single definitive or universally agreed-upon origin for them, though wind-and-water processes remain the leading scientific consensus.

== Geographic extent ==
Carolina bays are present in the U.S. Atlantic Coastal Plain within coastal New York, New Jersey, Delaware, Maryland, Virginia, North Carolina, South Carolina, Georgia, and north Florida. In Maryland, they are called Maryland basins. Within the Delmarva Peninsula, they and other coastal ponds are also called Delmarva bays.

== Origin of name ==
The name "Carolina bay" is sometimes attributed to the writings of the English explorer John Lawson, who explored North Carolina, South Carolina, and Georgia during the early 18th century. This attribution, however, is not correct. Lawson described visiting a swamp that contained bay trees, but there is no indication that he wanted to name the swamp with the word "bay". Furthermore, Lawson said that this swamp had steep margins and that he could see mountains to the west from the vicinity of the swamp. Thus, it seems more likely that this swamp was an inter-dune depression among the Carolina Sandhills, rather than a Carolina bay. Nevertheless, bay trees are present in some Carolina bays.

The earliest scientific description of Carolina bays is by L. C. Glenn (1895), who used the term "bay" (which he described as "lake-like expanses") to refer to these features near the town of Darlington, South Carolina. Glenn put quotation marks around the word "bay" but did not use the phrase "Carolina bay". A subsequent publication by F. A. Melton and William Schriever (1933) used the phrase "The Carolina Bays" (with quotation marks around the word "Bays"). Later, G. R. MacCarthy (1937) published a paper titled "The Carolina Bays", using this phrase throughout the publication (without quotation marks, and with a capital "B" for the word "Bays").

== Geomorphology ==
Carolina bays vary in size from one to several thousand acres. About 500,000 of them are present in the classic area of the Atlantic Coastal Plain, many in groups aligned in a northwest–southeast direction. Generally, the southeastern end has a higher rim composed of white sand.

=== Orientation ===
According to published papers and monographs, the average trend of the long axes of Carolina Bays varies from N16°W in east-central Georgia to N22°W in southern South Carolina, N39°W in northern South Carolina, N49°W in North Carolina, and N64°W in Virginia. Within this part of the Atlantic Coastal Plain, the orientation of the long axes of Carolina bays varies by 10 to 15 degrees. If the long axes of these Carolina bays, as measured by Johnson (1942), are projected westward, then they generally converge in the area of southeastern Indiana and southwestern Ohio.

At the northern end of the distribution of Carolina bays, within the Delmarva Peninsula and New Jersey, the average orientation of the long axes abruptly shifts by about 112 degrees to N48°E. Farther north, the orientation of the long axes becomes, at best, distinctly bimodal, exhibiting two greatly divergent directions, and, at worst, completely random, lacking any preferred direction. Plate 3 of Rasmussen and Slaughter, which is reproduced as Figure 51 of Kacrovowski, illustrates the disorganized nature of the orientations of the long axes of Carolina bays in Somerset, Wicomico, and Worcester counties, Maryland.

At the southern end of their distribution, the Carolina bays in southern Georgia and northern Florida are approximately circular in shape. In this area, they have a weak northerly orientation.

== Stratigraphic setting ==
Most Carolina bays consist of a few meters of sand and/or mud that rest on an unconformity above a harder substrate that does not show signs of deformation or other disturbance. The composition and the age of this harder substrate varies from location to location.

Stratigraphic relations of some Carolina bays with fields of eolian dunes in river valleys suggest that Carolina bays formed episodically during different times at different places. For example:

In some places, Carolina bays are inset into fields of eolian dunes in river valleys, and thus these Carolina bays must be younger than the underlying eolian dunes. One such example is Dukes Pond, which is a Carolina bay that is inset into eolian dunes in the valley of the Ohoopee River (Tattnall County, Georgia). These eolian dunes have yielded an optically stimulated luminescence date of ~23,600 years, and thus this Carolina Bay must be younger than this OSL date. Another example is Bear Swamp, which is a Carolina bay that is inset into eolian dunes in the valley of the Great Pee Dee River (Marion County, South Carolina).

In other places, Carolina bays are overlain by eolian dunes that are now vegetated, and thus these Carolina bays must be older than the overlying eolian dunes. One such example is Big Bay, which is a Carolina bay that is overlain by eolian dunes in the valley of the Wateree River (Sumter County, South Carolina). These eolian sand dunes at Big Bay have been dated by optically stimulated luminescence techniques at 29,600 ± 2,400 to 33,200 ± 2,800 BP, and thus this Carolina bay must be older than these dates.

== Stratigraphy within the Carolina bays and sand ridges ==
Cores taken within several Carolina bays have revealed a stratigraphy of a few meters of sand and/or mud resting on a unconformity above a harder substrate. Carolina bays for which the stratigraphy has been described in some detail include Lake Mattamuskeet (Hyde County, North Carolina), Wilson's Bay (Johnston County, North Carolina), Herndon Bay (Robeson County, North Carolina), Big Bay (Sumter County, South Carolina), Flamingo Bay (Aiken County, South Carolina), and Duke's Pond (Tattnall County, Georgia).

Lake Mattamuskeet (Hyde County, North Carolina): Cores from within this Carolina bay revealed a 0.3–1.2 m thick unit of sand and silty sand (lacustrine deposits and paleosols) that rests on an unconformity above an undisturbed unit of gray clay and sandy clay (with marine shells and burrows) of Pleistocene age. Cores from the adjacent sand rims revealed a 2.6–2.9 m thick unit of silt, sand silt, and silty sand (interpreted as paleosols, shoreline, loess, and eolian deposits) that rests on an unconformity above an undisturbed unit of gray clay and sandy clay (with marine shells and burrows) of Pleistocene age (the same unit that was encountered in cores from within the Carolina bay). Charcoal and wood from a western sand rim (closer to the bay) yielded radiocarbon ages of ~5,760 and 1,270 years before present (BP). Organic sediment and charcoal from an eastern sand rim (farther from the bay) yielded radiocarbon ages ranging from ~7,750 to 2,780 years BP.

Wilson's Bay (Johnston County, North Carolina): Cores and augers from within this Carolina bay revealed a 1.5–3.2 m thick unit of sand, sandy silt, and silty sand (lacustrine deposits) that rests on an unconformity above an undisturbed unit of saprolite (weathered felsic gneiss). These lacustrine deposits yielded a radiocarbon age of ~21,920 years BP. Cores and augers from the adjacent sand rims revealed a 1.5–4.0 m thick unit of muddy sand, sand, and gravel that rests on an unconformity above an undisturbed unit of saprolite/weathered felsic gneiss (the same unit that was encountered in cores from within the Carolina bay). Organic material within the bay yielded an age of ~21,920 radiocarbon years BP.

Herndon Bay (Robeson County, North Carolina): Cores drilled into four different sand ridges associated with this Carolina bay revealed that the sand ridges are composed of 2.5–4.5 m thick accumulations of fine to coarse sand that rest on an unconformity above an undisturbed unit of black mud of Cretaceous age (Black Creek Formation). Sediment samples from sand rims associated with this Carolina bay have yielded three optically stimulated luminescence (OSL) ages of ~36,700 years ago; ~29,600 years ago; and ~27,200 years ago.

Big Bay (Sumter County, South Carolina): A core (drill hole D1/2) drilled within this Carolina bay went through the following units: (1) Drilling depth 0 to 4.5 m = eolian sand sheet that overlies the Carolina bay; (2) Drilling depth 4.5 to 9.0 m = silty sand and sandy mud with abundant organic material; and (3) Drilling depth 9.0 to 10.6 m = sandy clay of Pliocene age (Duplin Formation). Sediment samples from sand rims associated with this Carolina bay have yielded four optically stimulated luminescence (OSL) ages of ~35,700 years ago; ~25,200 years ago; ~11,200 years ago; and ~2,100 years ago.

Within cores of undisturbed sediments recovered from Big Bay, North Carolina, Brook and others documented well-defined pollen zones consisting of distinct pollen assemblages. They found a stratigraphically consistent series of pollen zones, which increased in age consistently with depth from Holocene Stage to the Wisconsin Stage, back into marine isotope stage 5

Flamingo Bay (Aiken County, South Carolina): A core (C1) taken within this Carolina bay revealed a 0.94 m thick unit of quartz sand that rests on an unconformity (paleosol) above an undisturbed unit of sandy silt and clay of Eocene age. Charcoal samples within the 0.94 m thick unit of quartz sand yielded radiocarbon ages of ~4,500 to 2,500 years BP. A core (P25) taken from adjacent sand rim revealed a 1.85 m thick unit of Quaternary sand that rests on an unconformity (paleosol) above an undisturbed unit of sandy silt and clay of Eocene age (the same unit that was encountered in core C1 from within the Carolina bay). Moore et al. (2012) reported that sediment samples from sand ridges associated with this Carolina bay have yielded five OSL ages of ~15,000 years ago; ~13,100 years ago; ~11,500 years ago; ~9,200 years ago; and ~5,000 years ago. Brooks et al. (2010) reported that sediment samples from sand ridges associated with this Carolina Bay yielded OSL ages of ~108,700 years ago; and ~40,300 years ago.

Duke's Pond (Tattnall County, Georgia): A sediment sample from a sand rim at the margin of this Carolina has yielded an OSL age of ~23,600 years ago. Basal peat bog sediment within this Carolina bay yielded an age of ~8,600 radiocarbon years ago.

=== Additional notes on stratigraphy ===
In a study of several Carolina bays in North Carolina, Gamble et al. (1977) stated that drilling and coring indicated that the bedding and sediments underlying Carolina bays are undisturbed. Studies by Frey, Watts, and Whitehead have also documented that the sediments filling Carolina bays are generally undisturbed. Several cores have found that the sediments that fill Carolina bays have distinct and conformably layers or beds.

The dating of the sand rims of a number of Carolina bays by optically stimulated luminescence (OSL) techniques has yielded ages ranging from ~109,000 to ~2,000 years ago, but most ages from the sand rims range from ~40,000 to ~11,000 years ago.

Radiocarbon dates have been obtained from organic matter collected from the undisturbed sediments filling Carolina bays by Bliley and Burney, Mixon and Pilkey, Thom, and Kaczorowski. Some radiocarbon dates obtained from organic matter within undisturbed sediments are greater than 14,000 BP radiocarbon in age. The radiocarbon dates range from 27,700 ±2,600 to 440 ± 50 radiocarbon years BP. Some cores have contained organic matter that was too old for dating by radiocarbon methods, resulting in "greater than" dates. For example, samples from some Carolina bays have been dated at greater than 38,000 to 49,550 radiocarbon years BP. In cases where multiple radiocarbon dates have been determined from a single core, most radiocarbon dates are typically consistent in terms of their stratigraphic position within a core, and accumulation rates calculated from them only are rarely anomalous. Given the nature of radiocarbon dating, discordant dates occasionally occur even in undisturbed deposits, when multiple samples were dated. The occasional discordant dates by themselves are meaningless as an indicator of disturbance. The intact internal stratigraphy of the Carolina bay sediments, as indicated by paleosols and pollen zones (e.g. Big Bay) refutes such arguments.

As discussed by Gaiser, radiocarbon dates reported from any Carolina bay are minimum dates for their formation. The radiocarbon dates only represent times during which organic matter accumulated and was preserved in Carolina bays. At other times, datable organic matter either might not have been preserved as sediment accumulated within them, or older organic matter might have been destroyed when the bays dried out. During times when the water table was below the bottom of a Carolina bay (e.g., possibly during glacial periods when sea level was 130 meters (400 ft) below present), organic matter could have been destroyed by oxidization and weathering. Also, during such times, eolian processes could have eroded any existing sediments at the bottom of Carolina bays. There are some who suggest that the oldest radiocarbon date from a Carolina bay only indicates the time when the water table rose high enough for a permanent lake or swamp to exist within it. This interpretation, however, may depend upon the nature of the overlying sediment. For example, eolian processes can bury and preserve organic matter, and thus the preservation of organic matter can occur independently of water table behavior.

== Ecological significance and biodiversity ==
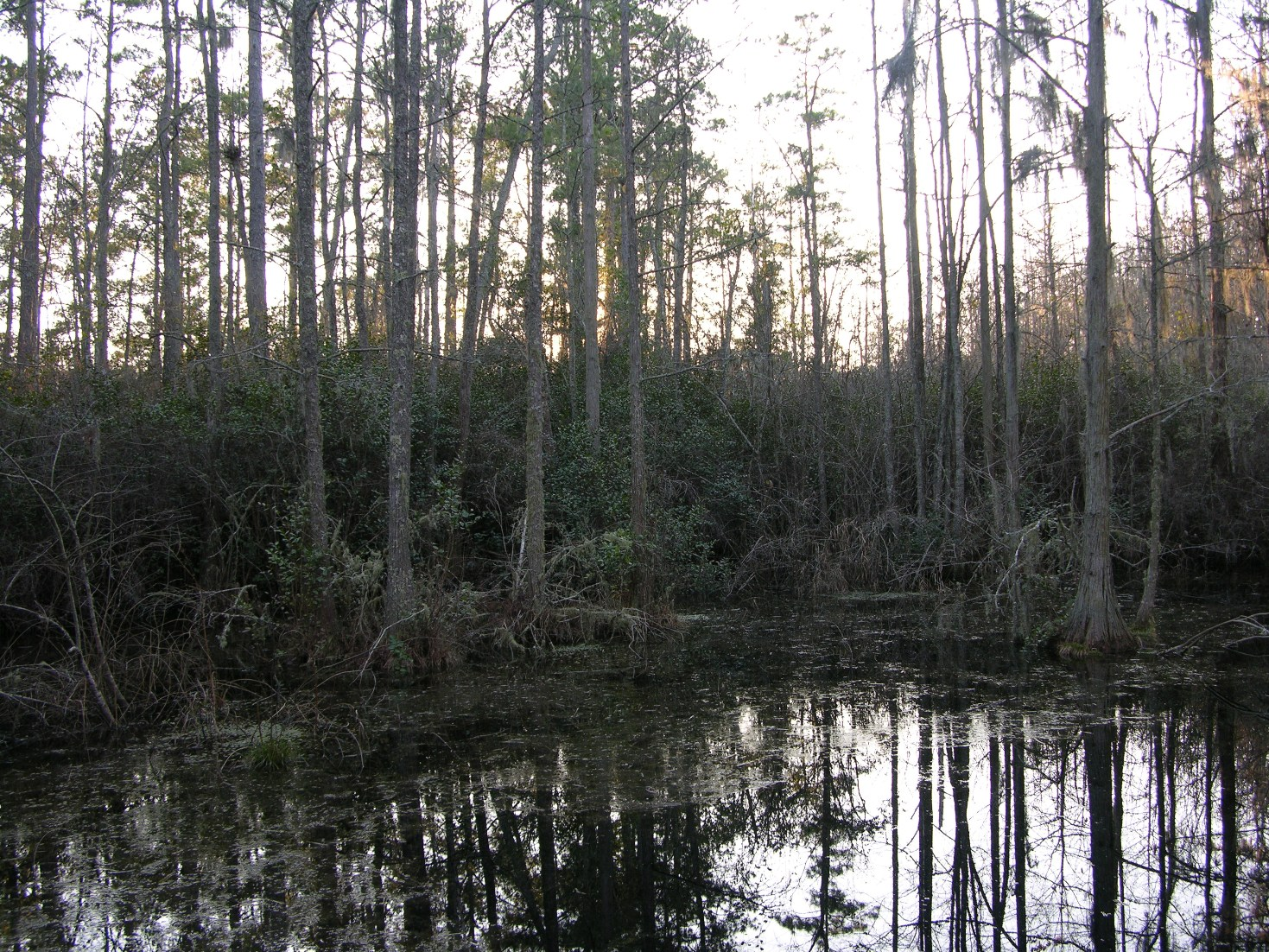
Woods Bay State Park, South Carolina, winter twilight

The bays have many different vegetative structures, based on the depression depth, size, hydrology, and subsurface. Many are marshy; a few of the larger ones are (or were before drainage) lakes; 14-square-mile (36 km^{2}) Lake Waccamaw is an undrained example. Some bays are predominantly open water with large scattered pond cypress, while others are composed of thick, shrubby areas (pocosins), with vegetation growing on floating peat mats. The bays are especially rich in biodiversity, including some rare and/or endangered species. Species that thrive in the bays' habitats include birds, such as wood storks, herons, egrets, and other migratory waterfowl, mammals such as deer, black bears, raccoons, skunks, and opossums. Other residents include dragonflies, green anoles and green tree frogs.

The bays contain trees such as black gum, bald cypress, pond cypress, sweet bay, loblolly bay, red bay, sweet gum, maple, magnolia, pond pine, and shrubs such as fetterbush, clethra, sumac, button bush, zenobia, and gallberry. Plants common in Carolina bays are water lilies, sedges and various grasses. Several carnivorous plants inhabit Carolina bays, including bladderwort, butterwort, pitcher plant, and sundew.

Some bays have been greatly modified by human activities including farming, highway building, and construction of housing developments and golf courses. For example, Carvers Bay, a large bay in Georgetown County, South Carolina, was used as a bombing practice range during World War II. It has been drained and is mostly used for tree farming today. Others are used for vegetable or field crops with drainage. A study of bays located on the Delmarva peninsula estimated that 70% had been partially or fully converted to agriculture.

In South Carolina, Woods Bay, on the Sumter-Florence county line near Olanta, was designated a state park to preserve it as much as possible in its natural state. Also, 66 Bennett's Bay, near Manning, in Clarendon County, South Carolina, is a designated Heritage Preserve.

Another bay in Bamberg County, South Carolina is owned by the South Carolina Native Plant Society, which has been developing a 52-acre (210,000 m^{2}) preserve called the Lisa Matthews Memorial Bay, which is trying to preserve and increase the federally endangered wildflower Oxypolis canbyi (Canby's Dropwort) in the bay. The uplands area surrounding the bay is being restored from a loblolly pine plantation to the original longleaf pine. Included in the longleaf restoration is the restoration of wiregrass (Aristida beyrichiana) as a key understory plant. Its flammability aids in periodic burning, which is necessary for Canby's Dropwort and many of the other species unique to the environment.

== Interpretations (theories of origin) ==
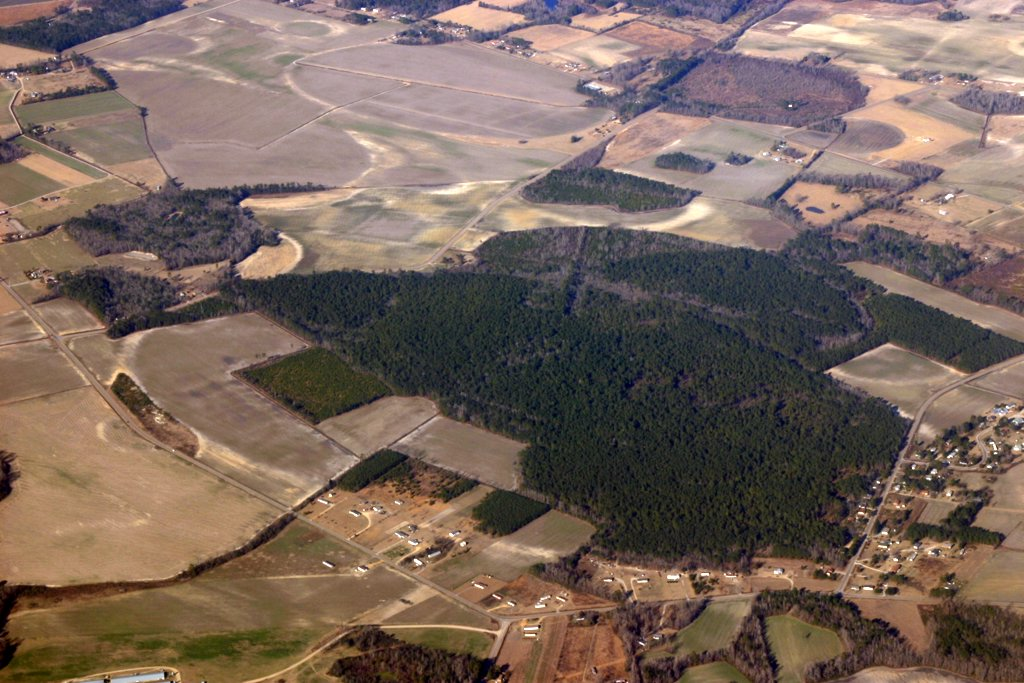
More than a dozen bays are shown in this photo in southeastern North Carolina. Several are cleared and drained for farming.

Most geologists today interpret the Carolina bays as relict geomorphological features that developed via various eolian and lacustrine processes. Multiple lines of evidence, e.g. radiocarbon dating, optically stimulated luminescence dating, and palynology, indicate that the Carolina bays predate the start of the Holocene. Fossil pollen recovered from cores of undisturbed sediment taken from various Carolina bays in North Carolina by Frey, Watts, and Whitehead document the presence of full glacial pollen zones within the sediments filling some Carolina bays. The range of dates can be interpreted that Carolina bays were either created episodically over the last tens of thousands of years or were created at time over a hundred thousand years ago and have since been episodically modified.

=== Relict thermokarst lakes ===
Recent work by the U.S. Geological Survey has interpreted the Carolina bays as relict thermokarst lakes that have been modified by eolian and lacustrine processes. Modern thermokarst lakes are common today around Barrow (Alaska), and the long axes of these lakes are oblique to the prevailing wind direction. These lakes develop by thawing of frozen ground, with subsequent modification by wind and waves. Thus, the interpretation of Carolina bays as relict thermokarst lakes implies that frozen ground once extended as far south as the Carolina bays. This interpretation is consistent with the optically stimulated luminescence dates, which suggest that the Carolina bays are relict features that formed when the climate was colder, drier, and windier.

Quaternary geologists and geomorphologists state that the features of the Carolina bays can be readily explained by known terrestrial processes and repeated modification by eolian and lacustrine processes. Also, Quaternary geologists and geomorphologists have found a correspondence in time between when active modification of the rims of Carolina bays most commonly occurred and when adjacent sand dunes were active during the Wisconsin glaciation between 15,000 and 40,000 years (Late Wisconsin) and 70,000 to 80,000 years BP (Early Wisconsin).

In addition, Quaternary geologists and geomorphologists have found that the orientations of the Carolina bays are consistent with the wind patterns that existed during the Wisconsin glaciation, as reconstructed from the orientations of parabolic dunes in river valleys. Within the Atlantic Coast Plain, the orientation of the long axes of Carolina bays and the inferred direction of movement of adjacent sand dunes, where present, are generally oblique to each other. In southern Georgia and northern Florida, the orientation is matched by an inferred west to east direction of movement of Pleistocene sand dunes. Northward from northern Georgia to Virginia, the average inferred direction of movement of Pleistocene parabolic sand dunes systematically shifts along with the average orientation of the long axes of Carolina bays as to lie oblique to them. In the Delmarva Peninsula, the 112-degree shift in the average trend of the long axes also corresponds with a shift in the average inferred direction of movement of Pleistocene parabolic sand dunes such that their direction of movement is also oblique to the long axes, as is the case in the rest of the Atlantic Coastal Plain.

=== Alternative interpretations ===
Many alternative hypotheses have been proposed for the origin of the Carolina Bays and been examined and that are either no longer or never were viewed favorably by most geologists. These hypotheses include their origin as spring basins, enclosed soundlets, groundwater solution depressions, artesian springs, salmon redds, streamlined groundwater flow forming limestone sinks, deflation hollows, intersecting river terraces, burning peat leading to subsidence, wind modified and ponded periglacial patterned ground, and from hydrogen seepage.

Some of the disfavored alternative hypotheses involve extraterrestrial events of some type. These hypotheses include meteorite impacts; shockwaves from a comet explosion; secondary impacts of glacial ice boulders ejected from a Younger Dryas impact in the Laurentide Ice Sheet; and speculative "cavitation" processes in an unproven, regional sandy, Mid-Pleistocene impact ejecta. These hypotheses are dismissed for a number of reasons including the wholesale lack of primary evidence for the extensive contemporary impact ejecta, impact processes, impactors, and suitable source impact crater for either sand or ice boulder ejecta.

== Similar landforms in the Gulf of Mexico coastal plain ==
Other landform depressions, not widely accepted as Carolina bays, are present within the northern Gulf of Mexico coastal plain in southern Mississippi and Alabama, where they are known as either Grady ponds or Citronelle ponds. They are also known by a variety of names such as pocks, pock marks, bagols, lacs ronds, and natural ponds. These features in southern Mississippi and Alabama are elliptical to roughly circular in shape. The measurement of the long axes of 200 elliptical Grady / Citronelle ponds in southwestern Baldwin County, Alabama found a very distinct orientation tightly clustered about N25°W.

Undrained depressions, circular to oval in shape and exhibiting a wide range of area and depth, are also a feature of the Gulf of Mexico coastal plain in Texas and southwest Louisiana. These depressions vary in size from .25 to 2 mi (0.4 to 3 km) in diameter. Within Harris County, Texas, raised rims, which are about 2 ft (0.6 m) high, partially enclose these depressions.

== See also ==
- Bladen Lake Group – Lakes in North Carolina, United States
- Rainwater Basin – Complex of wetlands in Nebraska, United States
