= Woods Bay State Park =

State park located near Olanta, Florence County, South Carolina

- IUCN category III (natural monument or feature)
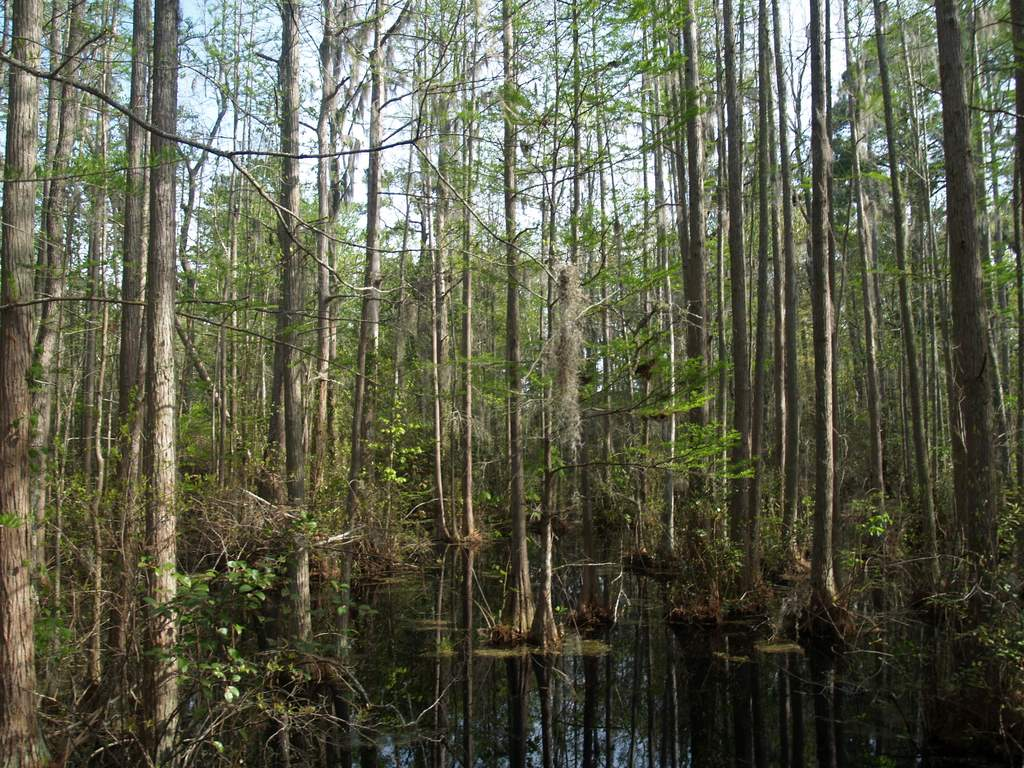
- Swampy area in Woods Bay State Park, Olanta, South Carolina
- Interactive map of Woods Bay State Park
- Nearest city: Olanta, South Carolina
- Coordinates: 33°56′38″N 79°59′28″W
- Area: 1,590 acres (6 km^{2})
- Elevation: 36.91 m (121.1 ft)
- Created: 1973

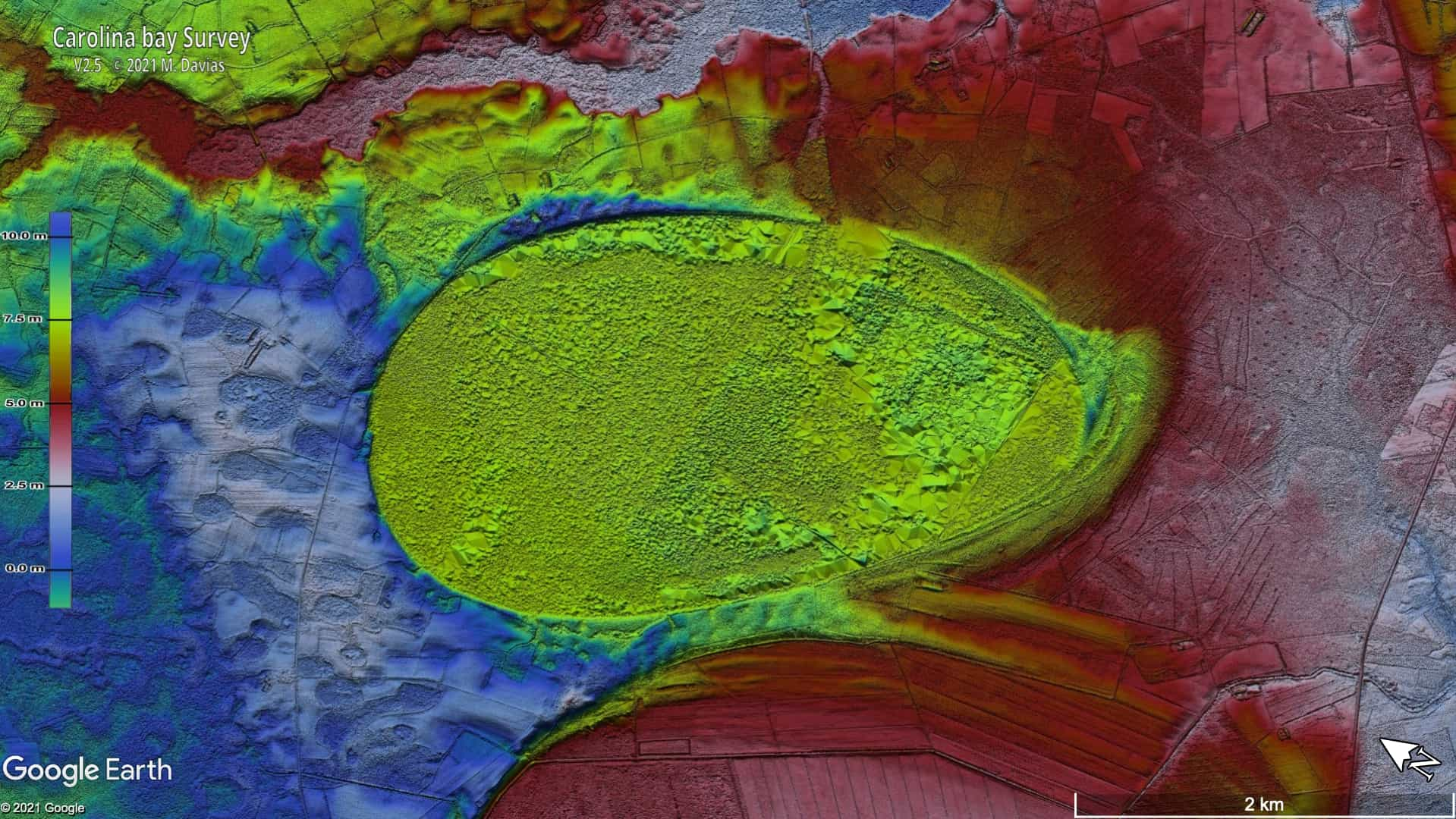
Woods Bay elevation map

Woods Bay State Park is a state park located near the town of Olanta in Florence County, South Carolina. The park contains some of the last remaining large Carolina Bays. Recent work by the U.S. Geological Survey has interpreted the Carolina Bays as relict thermokarst lakes that formed several thousands of years ago when the climate was colder, drier, and windier. Thermokarst lakes develop by thawing of frozen ground (permafrost) and by subsequent modification by wind and water. Thus, this interpretation suggests that permafrost once extended as far south as the Carolina Bays during the last ice age and (or) previous ice ages.

Activities available at the park include picnicking, fishing, hiking, bird watching and geocaching. Canoeing is also popular on the one-mile canoe trail in the Carolina Bay. While private boats are not allowed, rental canoes and kayaks are available.

Amenities include a picnic shelter, a boardwalk through a cypress-tupelo swamp and a nature center.
