= Lake Waccamaw State Park =

Nature park in North Carolina, USA

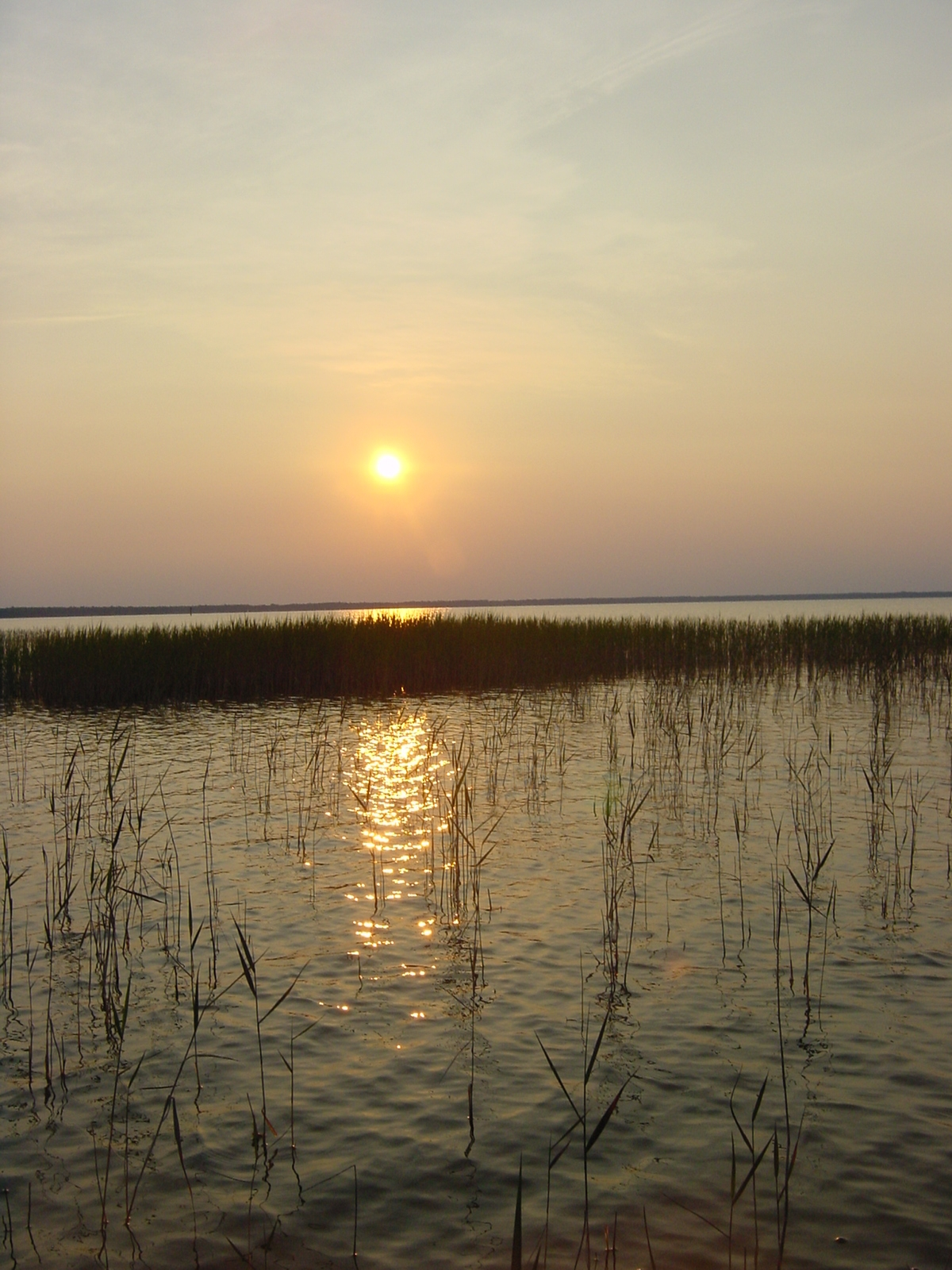

- Location within North Carolina Location within the United States
- Interactive map of Lake Waccamaw State Park
- Location: Columbus County, North Carolina, United States
- Coordinates: 34°16′44″N 78°27′56″W
- Area: 2,398 acres (970 ha)
- Elevation: 43 ft (13 m)
- Established: 1976
- Administrator: North Carolina Division of Parks and Recreation
- Website: Official website

Lake Waccamaw State Park is a North Carolina state park in Columbus County, North Carolina, in the United States. Located near the town of Lake Waccamaw, North Carolina, it covers 2,398-acre (9.70 km^{2}), along the shores of Lake Waccamaw, a Carolina bay. The U.S. Geological Survey has interpreted the Carolina Bays as relict thermokarst lakes that formed several thousands of years ago when the climate was colder, drier, and windier. Thermokarst lakes develop by thawing of frozen ground (permafrost) and by subsequent modification by wind and water. Thus, this interpretation suggests that permafrost once extended as far south as the Carolina Bays during the last ice age and (or) previous ice ages.

Lake Waccamaw State Park is located in North Carolina's Coastal Plain.
