= Rainwater Basin =

Complex of wetlands in Nebraska, United States

Rainwater Basin Wetland Management District
- IUCN category IV (habitat/species management area)
- Location within Nebraska Location within the United States
- Location: Nebraska, U.S.
- Nearest city: Kearney, Nebraska
- Coordinates: 40°42′30″N 99°04′52″W
- Area: 22,864 acres (92.53 km^{2})
- Established: 1963
- Governing body: U.S. Fish and Wildlife Service
- Website: Rainwater Basin Wetland Management District

The Rainwater Basin wetland region is a 4,200 sq mi (11,000 km^{2}) loess plain located south of the Platte River in south-central Nebraska. It lies principally in Adams, Butler, Clay, Fillmore, Hamilton, Kearney, Phelps, Polk, Saline, Seward, and York counties and extends into adjacent areas of southeastern Hall, northern Franklin, northern Nuckolls, western Saline, northern Thayer and northwestern Webster counties. Before European settlement, this plain was covered by prairie grasslands interspersed with thousands of ephemeral playa wetlands, called Rainwater Basins. Informally and locally, individual Nebraska Rainwater Basins are referred to as rainbasins, basins, lagoons, lakes, ponds, marshes, hay marshes, and lakes marshes. To the west, a tallgrass prairie in the east once gradually transitioned into mixed grass prairie. Currently, the Rainwater Basin wetland region is covered by farms, mainly growing corn and soybeans. Several, interspersed, stream courses, of which largest is the Big Blue River and its tributaries, drain this region. Riparian woodlands and upland slopes possessing oak woodlands are associated with these streams. In the spring and fall months, millions of migratory birds pass through the region to feed and rest. Along with riparian habitats associated Platte River, Big Blue River, its tributaries, and smaller streams, Rainwater Basins are a major component of the Central Flyway of North America.

Prior to its agricultural development in historic times, the Rainwater Basin wetland region was characterized by numerous playa wetlands, Rainwater Basins, numbering in the thousands. The shallow depressions, in which these wetlands occur are lined with a nearly impervious layer of clayey soil, a claypan, that prohibits surface water from penetrating the subsoil. As a result, Rainwater Basins are not naturally influenced by the water table and the sole source of water is run-off in the form of rain, snow and, currently, drainage from crop irrigation. Because the primary source of water for these wetlands is precipitation, they annually vary in depth, expanse and seasonality due to changes in precipitation regimes and are called Rainwater Basins.

== Rainwater Basin Wetland Management District ==
The Rainwater Basin Wetland Management District consists of 61 tracts of land, 59 of which are Waterfowl Production Areas, totaling 22,864 acres (9,253 ha) managed by the U.S. Fish and Wildlife Service. Established in 1963, the district is a complex of wetlands scattered across a 21-county area of Nebraska. One of the remaining two areas is McMurtrey Wildlife Management Area that was transferred from the U.S. Military and is closed to public use. The other tract is the Platte River National Wildlife Management Area and this property is owned by the state of Wyoming and managed through a memorandum of understanding. WPAs are small isolated tracts of land scattered throughout the District. The Wetland Management District is managed from offices in Kearney, Nebraska. All of the federally managed land was acquired from willing landowners and purchased with the proceeds of duck stamps that are sold to hunters each year.

== Birds of the Rainwater Basin ==
The Rainwater Basin wetland region is a prime location for birdwatching; 257 bird species have been observed in the region. Species in the Rainwater Basin include:

- Bald eagle
- Canada goose
- Killdeer
- Least sandpiper
- Mallard
- Northern pintail
- Northern shoveler
- Peregrine falcon
- Piping plover
- Sandhill crane
- Snow goose
- White-fronted goose
- Greater and lesser yellowlegs

== Rainwater Basins ==
The subtle depressions known locally as Rainwater Basins lie scattered across the loess plain of south-central Nebraska. The majority of them lie to the south of the Platte River. Prior to European settlement, there were nearly 4,000 of these wetlands totaling up 40,500-hectare (100,000-acre). The smaller, pothole depressions, which are irregular in shape and do not exhibit any orientation, range from about 0.1–30-hectare (0.25–74.13-acre) in size. Their bottoms generally lie less than 3 feet (0.91 m) below the surrounding land surface at their lowest point. Most of these smaller depressions have been destroyed by agricultural activities such as filling, land leveling, drainage, and sedimentation.

Starks first recognized that the larger of these basins are approximately elliptical to elongate in shape. The larger and semi-elliptical of these basins typically measure about 0.4–0.9 miles (0.64–1.45 km) by 0.9–1.5 miles (1.4–2.4 km). Most basins are closed depressions that hold runoff from the surrounding landscape to form seasonal lakes and wetlands in them. Some of these basins have been naturally breached, or drain to an outside watershed, and no longer hold precipitation run-off. Many of the large semi-elliptical to elliptical Rainwater Basins have a crescent-shaped ridge that Stark referred to as a lunette located on the southeast side of them. These distinctive ridges are about 15–50 feet (4.6–15.2 m) in relief.

Since European settlement of this region, about 90% of these wetlands have disappeared. Many have been drained so that the land could be used for agricultural purposes. Many of the remaining sites have been set aside by government agencies and non-profit organizations; today, there are 84 publicly owned Rainwater Basin sites, totaling 11,600-hectare (29,000-acre) of protected wildlife habitat.

== Geomorphology of Rainwater Basins ==
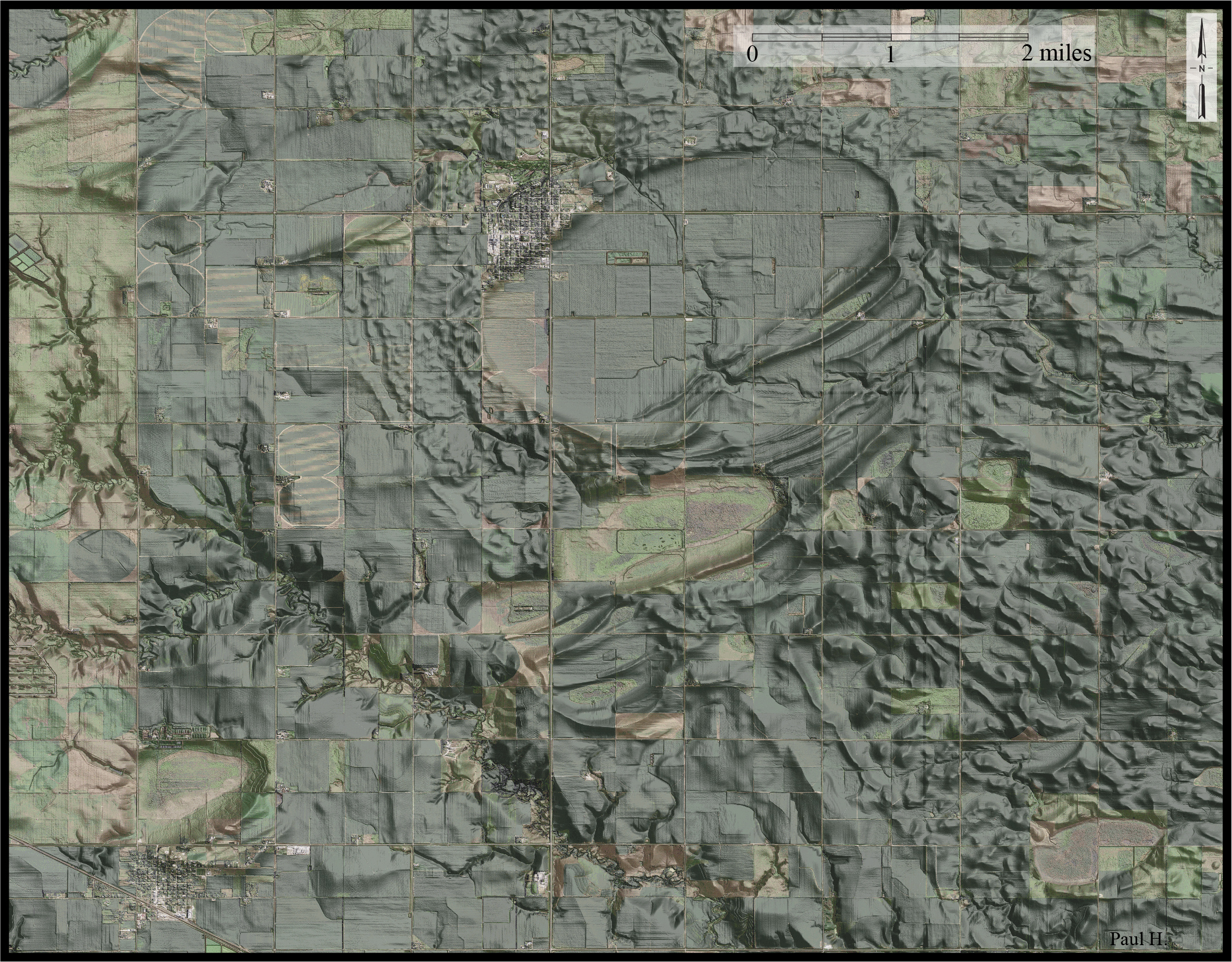
Combination of shaded relief and natural color orthophoto map illustrating Rainwater Basins found around Clay Center, Clay County, Nebraska.

The large semi-elliptical to elliptical Rainwater Basins are the surface expression of older elliptical depressions developed in fluvial sands and gravels that are buried by a blanket of a 2.5–8 meters (8.2–26.2 ft) thick sequence of layered loesses and associated paleosols. The loess, which overlies these features, consists of an undisturbed sequence, from bottom to top, of Middle Wisconsinan Gilman Canyon Formation (loess), a regional paleosol developed in Gilman Canyon Formation, Late Wisconsinan Peoria Loess, Brady Soil (paleosol) developed in the Peoria Loess, and Holocene Bignell Loess in which the modern soil has developed. This loess sequence lies upon a paleosol developed in the fluvial sands and gravels in which these depressions initially developed. Thus, the modern basin landscape is a direct result of the accumulation a few meters of loess that blankets an older basin landscape. These basins are palimpsest landforms created by the episodic accumulation of a blanket of loess over a prehistoric landscape with numerous basins.

Like their associated Rainwater Basins, the crescent-shaped ridges (lunettes) are also blanketed by loess. Although a complete sequence of Peoria loess overlying Gilman Canyon Formation and associated paleosols cover the ridges, the overall thickness of loess is slightly thinner than the loess covering the adjacent uplands and depressions. Where they have been cored, the ridges underlying the loess consist of well-sorted sand on the order of 3–5 meters (9.8–16.4 ft) thick. Also buried by loess beneath the surface of the Rainwater Basin wetland region are the relict channel belt of the Pleistocene Platte River and relict fields of sand dunes. The original Rainwater Basins are associated with both of these buried Pleistocene landscapes.

The age of the loesses and associated paleosols that buried the original Rainwater basins and the fluvial sand in which they formed have been dated by either radiocarbon dating, optically stimulated luminescence dating, or both. The oldest loess overlying original Rainwater basins have yielded ages from about 28,000 to 36,000 BP radiocarbon years and optically stimulated luminescence up to 36,000 BP calendar years. The fluvial sands of a pleistocene Platte River, which overlain by the Gilman Canyon formation and younger loesses, yielded optically stimulated luminescence dates from about 36,000 to 50,000 BP calendar years. These dates demonstrate that the Rainwater basins were formed prior to the Middle Wisconsinan, Marine Isotope Stage 3, and the accumulation of the Gilman Canyon Formation. Thus, Rainwater basins and their associated ridges are relict, pre-Last Glacial Maximum landforms that have migrated upward in elevation as successive layers of glacial-age loess have accumulated and intercalated soils sporadically formed.
