= Lake Waccamaw =

Lake in Columbus County, North Carolina, United States

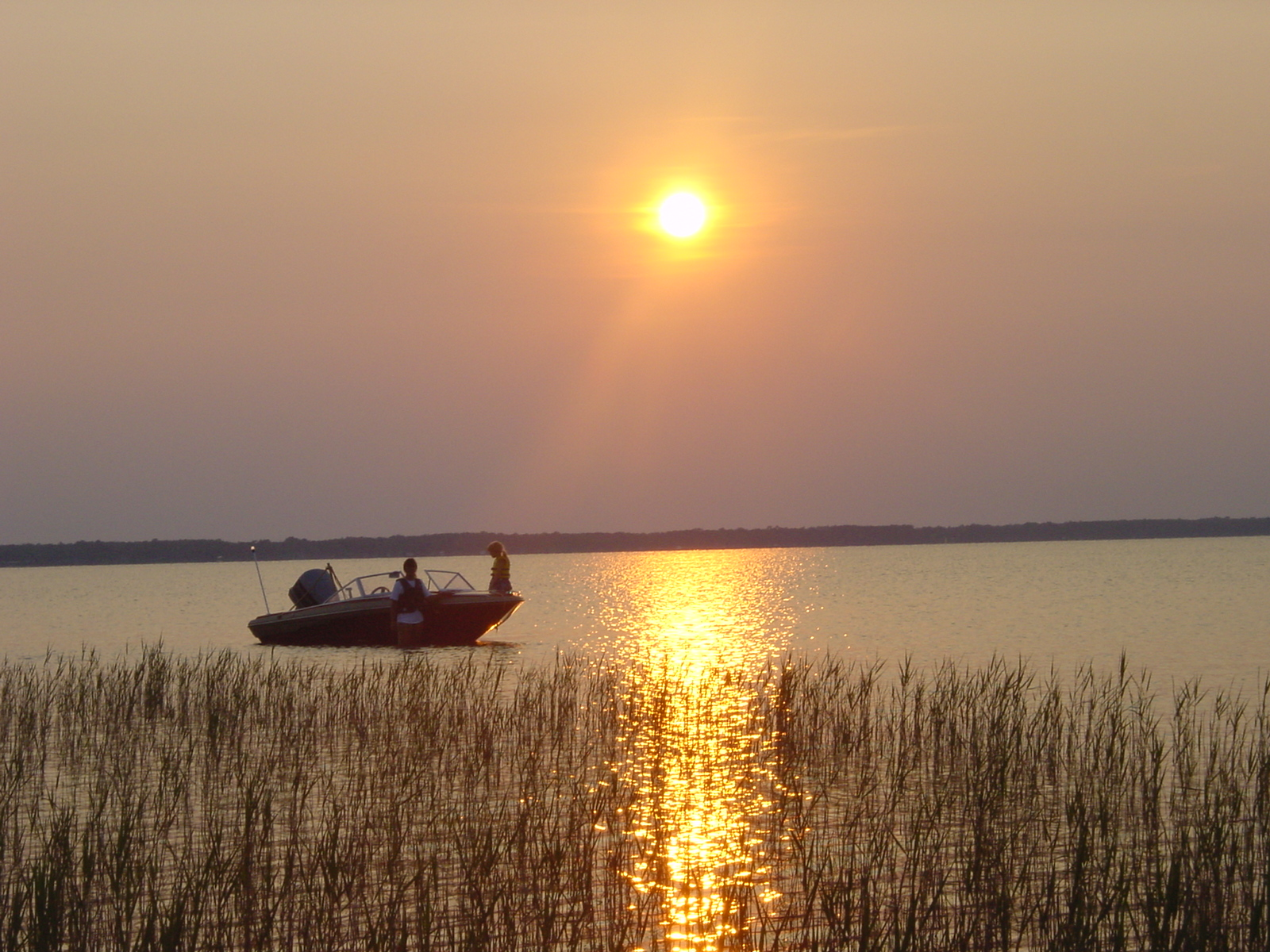
- Sunset from State Park by Joey Nobles

- Location within North Carolina Location within the United States
- Location: Columbus County, North Carolina
- Coordinates: 34°17′12″N 78°30′35″W
- Part of: Lake Waccamaw State Park
- Primary inflows: Big Creek; First Little, Second Little and Third Little Creeks
- Basin countries: United States
- Managing agency: North Carolina Division of Parks and Recreation
- Designation: State Lake
- Surface area: 8,938 acres (3,617 ha)
- Average depth: 7.5 ft (2.3 m)
- Shore length^{1}: 14 mi (23 km)
- Surface elevation: 43 ft (13 m)
- Settlements: Lake Waccamaw
- ^{1} Shore length is not a well-defined measure.

Lake Waccamaw is a freshwater drainage lake located in Columbus County, North Carolina. It is the largest of the natural Carolina Bay lakes, with a surface area of 36 km^{2}. Lake Waccamaw is fed by four creeks: First, Second, Third, and Big creeks. The outlet forms the Waccamaw River, which empties into the Atlantic ocean via the Winyah Bay at Georgetown, South Carolina. The lake and its respective river are named after the local Waccamaw-Siouan tribe, who are long inhabitants of the region. Lake Waccamaw is 15,000 - 32,000 years old, but already contains several endemic species including various fish, mussels, and snails. The lake is a popular recreational destination among residents and tourists, becoming a state park in 1976.

== Geography ==
Lake Waccamaw has a broad, flat bottom of gyttja (mud) and peat, that follow a burial rate of ~0.075 mm/year. It is encircled by sandy shallows and submerged sandy terraces that extend up to 1,650 ft (500 m) offshore. The lake is oval in shape, measuring roughly 5.2 miles (8.4 km) by 3.5 miles (5.6 km), covering 8,938 acres (3,617 ha) surface area with an average depth of 7.5 feet (2.3 m), max depth of 10.8 feet (3.3 m), and a shoreline of about 14 miles (23 km). The lake is fed mainly by Big Creek and the surrounding swamp lands. The organic matter from the decaying vegetation makes the swamps' water tea-colored. Unlike most of the other Carolina Bay lakes, Lake Waccamaw gets the majority of its water from the surrounding swamp, instead of direct rain water. The lake is contains limestone outcrops in the basin, which contributes to its clear water, neutral pH ranging from 6.8 to 7.5, and high alkalinity. This makes the lake ideal for a wide range of aquatic life. Lake Waccamaw has several feeders, called First Little, Second Little and Third Little Creeks and then Big Creek as well as water from the Friar swamp. The lake receives a steady inflow of 2.6 m^{3}/s on average, and drains through the Waccamaw river at the same rate.

== Geology ==
Lake Waccamaw is one of the larger Carolina Bays. Recent work by the U.S. Geological Survey has interpreted the Carolina Bays formed several thousands of years ago when the climate was colder, drier, and windier. Thermokarst lakes develop by thawing of frozen ground (permafrost) and by subsequent modification by wind and water. Thus, this interpretation suggests that permafrost once extended as far south as the Carolina Bays during the last ice age and (or) previous ice ages.

The lake has been estimated to be between 15,000 and 30,000 years old. It is underlain by strata containing fossils of various ages, including the lower Pliocene Goose Creek Limestone and the lower Pleistocene Waccamaw Formation. In 2008, a whale fossil was found in the lake. Scientists have removed the bones of a whale that they say may date back 1 - 3 million years. The skull of the whale has been restored and is currently on display at Lake Waccamaw State Park through longstanding loan from the North Carolina Museum of Natural Sciences.

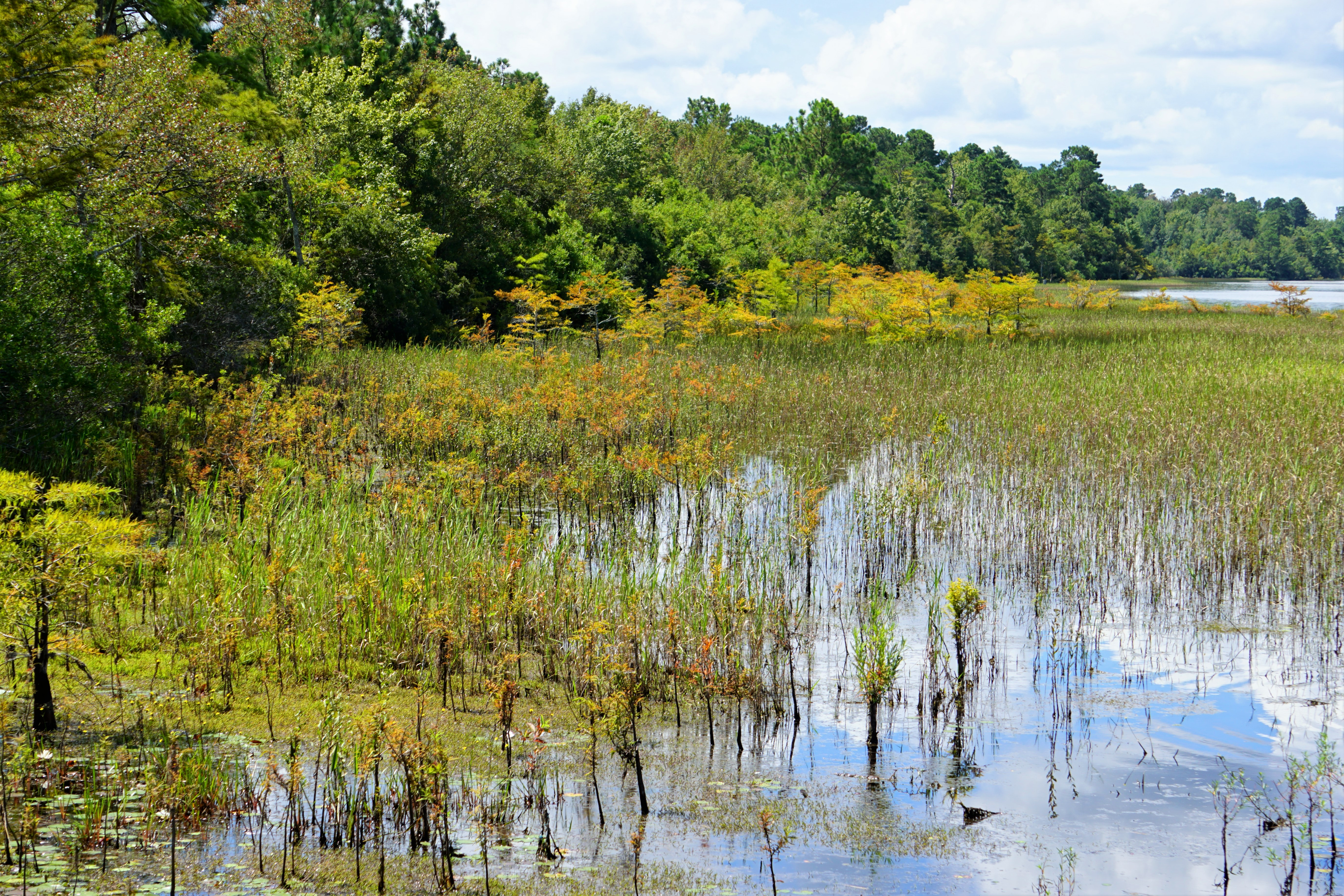
Lake Waccamaw wetland

== Ecology ==
Lake Waccamaw is a diverse ecosystem, containing over 50 unique species. Several endemic species are found only in or around the lake, including the Waccamaw darter, silverside and killifish, snails including the Waccamaw amnicola and siltsnail, as well as various mussels. The general structure of these species suggest lacustrine adaptation from their closest riverine relatives. Noticeable changes include more vertebrae, as well as elongated body shapes when compared to riverine counterparts. Genetic analysis shows that the mussel species reported as endemic are not distinct from populations outside the lake, but many of the freshwater mollusks and fish found in the lake are imperiled, especially with declining water quality. Fifteen species of mussels and clams are reported from the lake. Alligators are also found at Lake Waccamaw.

Fish Species in Lake Waccamaw
Species	Family	Habitat	Trophic level	Status
Acantharchus pomotis	Centrarchidae	demersal	3.0	native
Ameiurus catus	Ictaluridae	demersal	3.8	native
Ameiurus natalis	Ictaluridae	demersal	3.3	native
Ameiurus platycephalus	Ictaluridae	demersal	3.4	native
Amia calva	Amiidae	demersal	3.8	native
Anguilla rostrata	Anguillidae	demersal	3.7	native
Aphredoderus sayanus	Aphredoderidae	demersal	3.4	native
Centrarchus macropterus	Centrarchidae	demersal	3.7	native
Cyprinus carpio carpio	Cyprinidae	benthopelagic	3.0	native
Dorosoma cepedianum	Clupeidae	pelagic	2.0	native
Elassoma zonatum	Elassomatidae	demersal	3.0	native
Enneacanthus gloriosus	Centrarchidae	demersal	3.0	native
Enneacanthus obesus	Centrarchidae	demersal	3.0	native
Erimyzon oblongus	Catostomidae	demersal	2.8	native
Erimyzon sucetta	Catostomidae	demersal	2.8	native
Esox americanus americanus	Esocidae	demersal	3.4	native
Esox niger	Esocidae	demersal	4.0	native
Etheostoma fusiforme	Percidae	benthopelagic	3.2	native
Etheostoma perlongum	Percidae	benthopelagic	3.4	endemic
Fundulus waccamensis	Fundulidae	benthopelagic	3.0	endemic
Gambusia affinis	Poeciliidae	benthopelagic	3.2	native
Lepisosteus osseus	Lepisosteidae	demersal	4.2	native
Lepomis auritus	Centrarchidae	demersal	3.1	native
Lepomis gibbosus	Centrarchidae	benthopelagic	3.1	native
Lepomis gulosus	Centrarchidae	demersal	3.7	native
Lepomis macrochirus	Centrarchidae	benthopelagic	3.3	native
Lepomis punctatus	Centrarchidae	demersal	3.0	native
Menidia extensa	Atherinidae	pelagic	3.2	endemic
Micropterus salmoides	Centrarchidae	benthopelagic	3.8	native
Morone americana	Moronidae	demersal	3.0	native
Notemigonus crysoleucas	Cyprinidae	demersal	3.0	native
Notropis chalybaeus	Cyprinidae	benthopelagic	3.0	native
Notropis petersoni	Cyprinidae	benthopelagic	3.0	native
Noturus gyrinus	Ictaluridae	demersal	3.2	native
Perca flavescens	Percidae	benthopelagic	3.7	native
Pomoxis nigromaculatus	Centrarchidae	benthopelagic	4.2	native
Umbra pygmaea	Umbridae	demersal	3.6	native

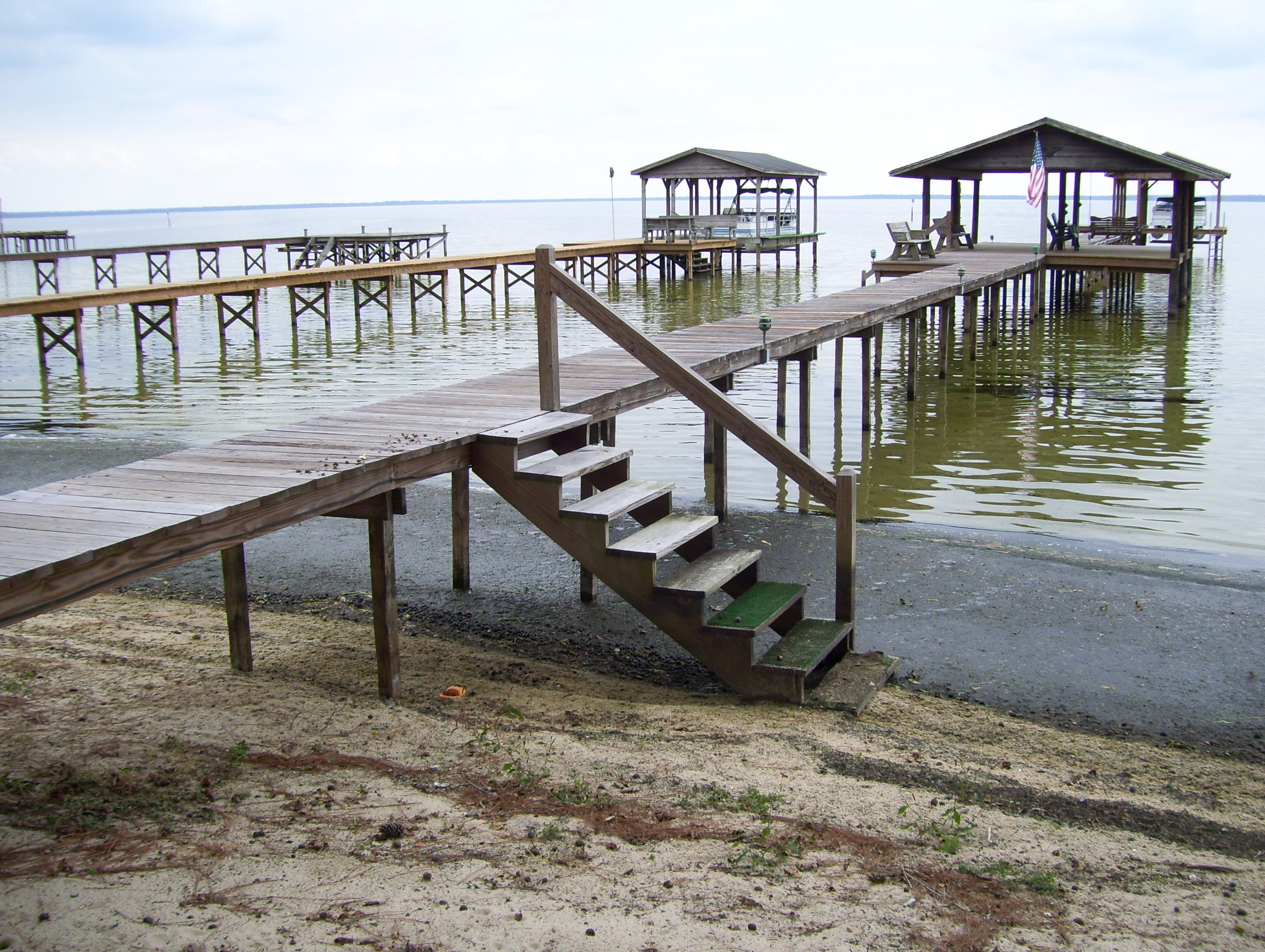
Water Level from the shore in 2007 by Joey Nobles

The lack of rain in the eastern portion of North Carolina during 2007 affected the water level in Lake Waccamaw. Water levels dropped greater than 15 inches (380 mm) below normal as of late 2007. The record low is 19.5 inches (500 mm) recorded in 1993. The record high was 37 inches (940 mm) above normal in 1999. In 2008, some additional rain and swamp drainage had increased the water levels.

In October 2012 there was a hydrilla outbreak. Efforts to free the lake of the invasive weed were estimated to take between 5 and 7 years.

The lake was established as a North Carolina State Lake in 1929, and it is managed by the adjacent Lake Waccamaw State Park.

A dam at the outlet, built in 1926, regulates lake levels.
