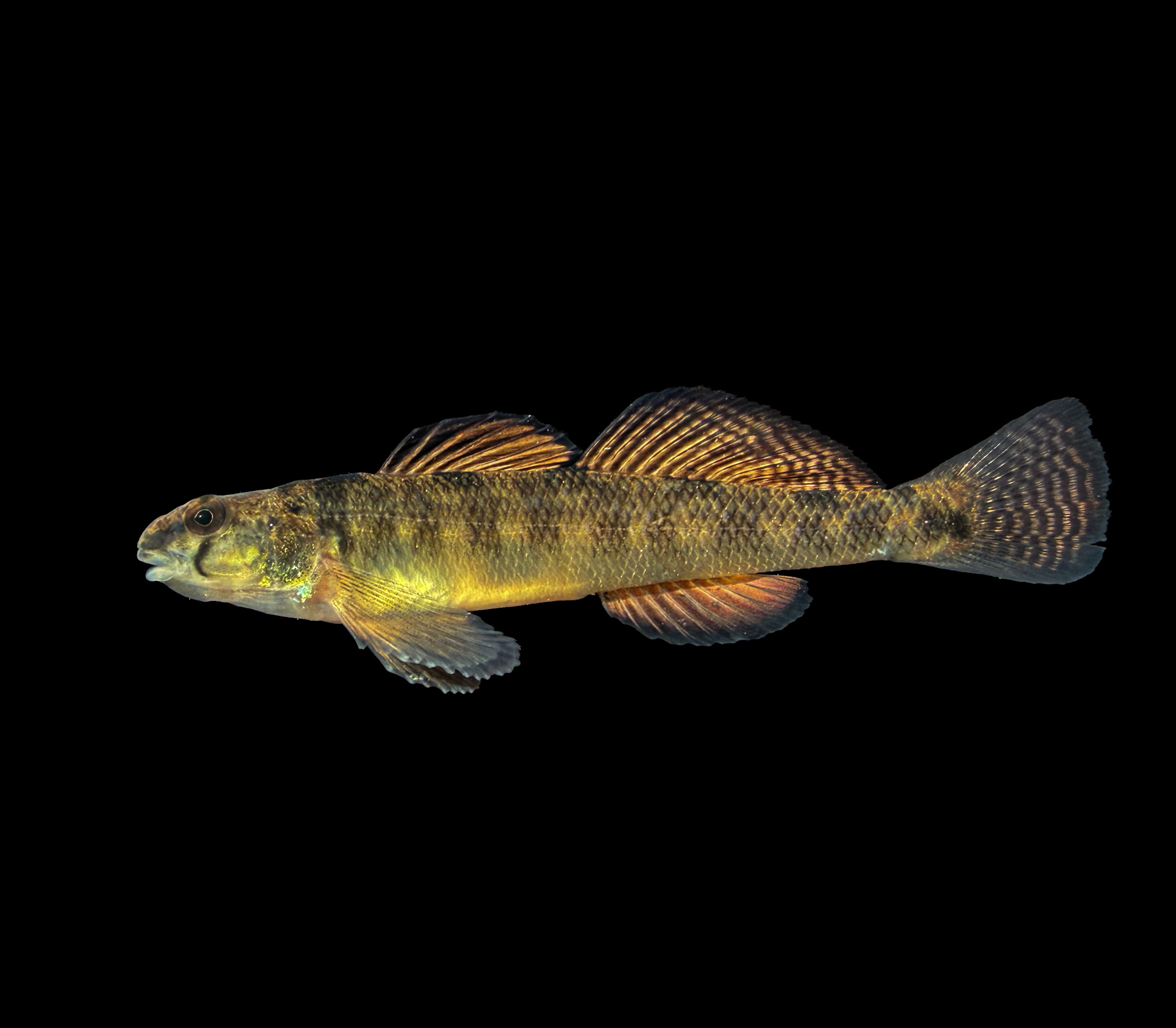

Conservation status
- Vulnerable (IUCN 3.1)

Scientific classification
- Kingdom: Animalia
- Phylum: Chordata
- Class: Actinopterygii
- Division: Teleostei
- Order: Perciformes
- Family: Percidae
- Genus: Etheostoma
- Species: E. perlongum

Binomial name
- Etheostoma perlongum (Hubbs & Raney, 1946)

Synonyms
- Boleosoma perlongum Hubbs & Raney, 1946

= Waccamaw darter =

Species of fish

The Waccamaw darter (Etheostoma perlongum) is a species of freshwater ray-finned fish. A darter from the subfamily Etheostomatinae, it is part of the family Percidae, which also contains the perches, ruffes and pikeperches. The Waccamaw darter is found in the eastern United States, where it is endemic to Lake Waccamaw in North Carolina, where it inhabits shallow, sandy areas of the Lake. This species can reach a length of 9.0 cm (3.5 in).
