= Waccamaw silverside =

Conservation status
- Vulnerable (IUCN 3.1)

- Threatened (ESA)

Scientific classification
- Kingdom: Animalia
- Phylum: Chordata
- Class: Actinopterygii
- Division: Teleostei
- Order: Atheriniformes
- Family: Atherinopsidae
- Genus: Menidia
- Species: M. extensa

Binomial name
- Menidia extensa C. L. Hubbs & Raney, 1946

Species of ray-finned fish

The Waccamaw silverside (Menidia extensa) is a rare species of fish in the family Atherinopsidae. It is a federally listed threatened species of the United States.

== Taxonomy ==
The Waccamaw silverside is a member of the genus Menidia (the common silversides) of the Atlantic and Gulf coasts of the United States. Members of this genus reside along the Atlantic coast, spanning from Massachusetts to Florida. Specifically, Menidia extensa resides solely in Lake Waccamaw, North Carolina.

== Description ==
The Waccamaw silverside is a small (growing to about 2.5 in (64 mm)), slim, almost transparent freshwater fish with a silvery stripe along each side. Its body is laterally compressed, the eyes are large, and the jaw is sharply angled upward. The Waccamaw silverside has 42-45 vertebrae and 44-50 lateral scales. The Waccamaw silverside is a principal forage species, meaning that it serves as prey for other species.

== Habitat and distribution ==
Lake Waccamaw, North Carolina

The Waccamaw silverside is endemic to Lake Waccamaw, in southeastern North Carolina. Lake Waccamaw is a natural lake with an approximate surface area of 8,934 acres (36.15 km^{2}) and an average depth of 7.5 feet (2.3 m). Although it is fed by acidic swamp streams, the lake has a virtually neutral composition. This neutral condition, unusual among North Carolina's coastal plain lakes, is believed to be caused by the buffering effect of the calcareous Waccamaw Limestone formation, which underlies the lake and is exposed on the north shore. The Waccamaw silverside inhabits open water throughout the lake, where schools are commonly found near the surface over shallow, dark-bottomed areas. They are more likely to be found above areas with little vegetation.

Lake Waccamaw is located in Columbus County, North Carolina, and is a shallow coastal plain. Lake Waccamaw occurs in a feeder stream entitled Big Creek. Within Lake Waccamaw, the range of the Waccamaw silverside's habitat is less than about forty square miles. The fish are endemic to North Carolina, essentially meaning that they are not located in any other habitat. Lake Waccamaw is a freshwater habitat, and the silverside can thrive in both deep and shallow water.

== Diet ==
The Waccamaw silverside is classified as an invertivore, indicating that they eat creatures without a backbone, or invertebrates. Ecological studies of the species indicate that the fish mainly feed on zooplankton. Other food sources that the Menidia extensa prey on are ostracods, cladocerans and other aquatic insects. Menidia extensa is one of the largest forage species within Lake Waccamaw.

== Reproduction ==
Spawning is the term referred to a reproductive act between two fish. Spawning occurs when a female releases unfertilized eggs and a male releases sperm into the water to reproduce. For the Waccamaw silverside, spawning occurs during the months of March through July, ideally when water temperatures are within the 68-72 degrees Fahrenheit range. The average female produces 150 eggs. Spawning occurs near the shoreline of the lake. The Waccamaw silverside is not sexually dimorphic, meaning that there is no clear differentiation between males and females. The fish are sexually mature and able to reproduce at 30 millimeters. Normally, the fish die after spawning and do not live a second year.

== Conservation status and threats ==
According to the U.S. Fish and Wildlife Service, the Waccamaw silverside is listed as threatened under conservation status. The reason as to why the species is threatened is because the shoreline of Lake Waccamaw is becoming very developed by new homes and cottages. The shoreline of the lake is divided up, with three-fourths belonging to this development and the other one-fourth belonging to the Lake Waccamaw State Park. Ecologists believe that this species should be protected against drainage within Waccamaw Lake so that the fish are protected from extinction. A recovery plan conducted by the U.S Fish and Wildlife Service is in place to protect the habitat by researching the habitat requirements for all life stages of Menidia extensa, as well as conducting biannual monitoring of the population.

Another issue relating to the conservation of the Waccamaw silverside lies within nutrient loading. Nutrient loading refers to the act of excessively loading nutrients into a body of water, which disrupts the natural ecological balance within the habitat. Nutrient loading within the lake has increased over the past 37 years, and inordinate increase of nutrients could accelerate existing water quality conditions that may threaten the existence of the species.
