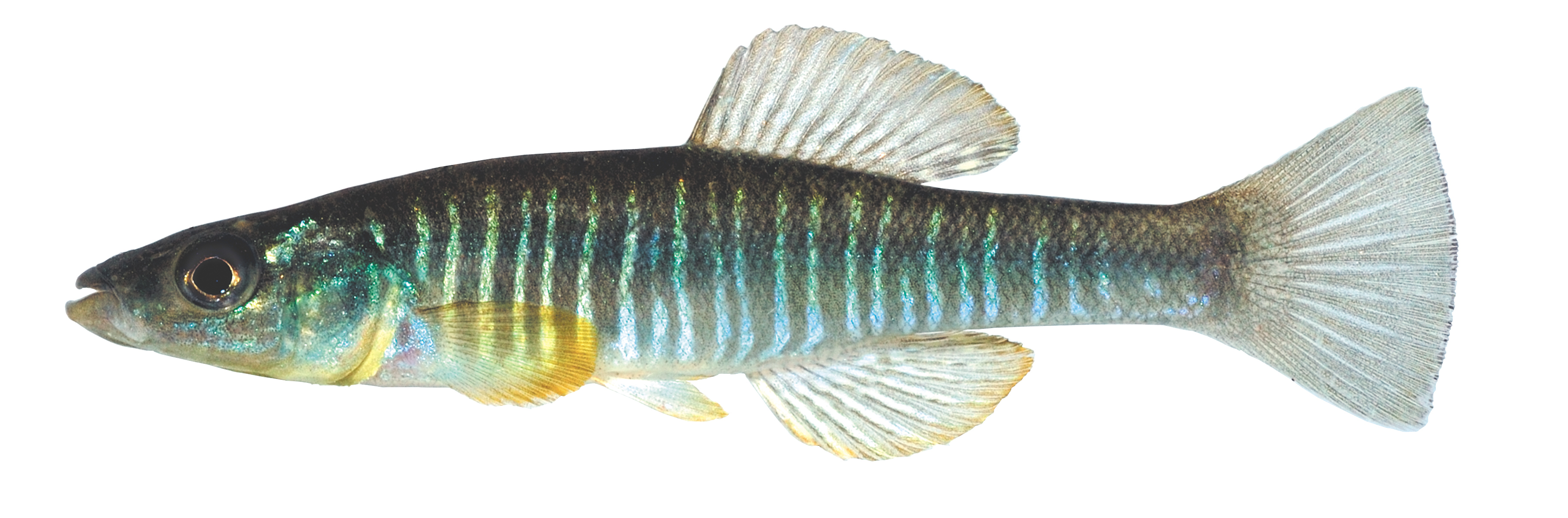

Conservation status
- Vulnerable (IUCN 3.1)

Scientific classification
- Kingdom: Animalia
- Phylum: Chordata
- Class: Actinopterygii
- Order: Cyprinodontiformes
- Family: Fundulidae
- Genus: Fundulus
- Species: F. waccamensis

Binomial name
- Fundulus waccamensis C. L. Hubbs & Raney, 1946

= Waccamaw killifish =

Species of fish

The Waccamaw killifish (Fundulus waccamensis) is a species of fish in the family Fundulidae. It is endemic to Lake Waccamaw, a lake in North Carolina, United States, and its tributaries.

== Distribution and habitat ==
Reliable reports of this species' occurrence are from only a single location, Lake Waccamaw and its tributaries, in Columbus County, North Carolina. While restricted in range, the fish is common there and total population may exceed 1 million. It is found in mid-level or near-surface waters over sandy bottoms in open waters or closer to vegetation around shores, and in winter may venture into surrounding swamps and canals. This species has been recorded in Lake Phelps in Washington County, North Carolina where it was most likely introduced by anglers using it as bait.

== Conservation ==
While there are no known specific threats to the Waccamaw killifish, it is currently classified as vulnerable by the IUCN because of its restriction to a single location.
