= National Register of Historic Places listings in Bladen County, North Carolina =

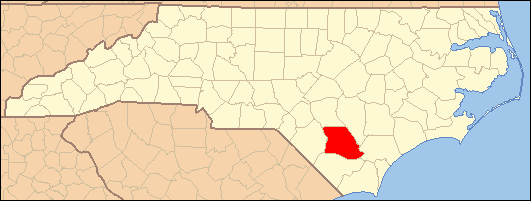

This list includes properties and districts listed on the National Register of Historic Places in Bladen County, North Carolina. Click the "Map of all coordinates" link to the right to view an online map of all properties and districts with latitude and longitude coordinates in the table below.

This National Park Service list is complete through NPS recent listings posted March 14, 2025.

	Name on the Register	Image	Date listed	Location	City or town	Description
1	Bladen County Training School	Bladen County Training School	September 11, 2018 (#100002926)	1360 Martin Luther King Jr. Dr. 34°37′15″N 78°37′06″W	Elizabethtown	
2	Brown Marsh Presbyterian Church	Brown Marsh Presbyterian Church	September 2, 1975 (#75001239)	N of Clarkton on SR 1700 off SR 1762; 34°31′33″N 78°38′19″W	Clarkton	
3	Carver's Creek Methodist Church		April 30, 2008 (#08000365)	16904 NC 87 E. 34°27′19″N 78°24′29″W	Council	
4	John Hector Clark House	John Hector Clark House	May 20, 1987 (#87000039)	SE corner jct. of S. Grove and E. Green Sts. 34°29′19″N 78°39′15″W	Clarkton	
5	Clarkton Depot	Clarkton Depot	December 23, 1986 (#86003463)	Elm and Hester Sts. 34°29′21″N 78°39′29″W	Clarkton	
6	Desserette		October 7, 1987 (#87001786)	SW side of SR 1320 near jct. with SR 1318; 34°47′57″N 78°46′13″W	White Oak	
7	Gilmore-Patterson Farm		July 28, 1999 (#99000912)	20337 NC 87 W 34°48′22″N 78°49′50″W	St. Pauls	
8	Harmony Hall	Harmony Hall	March 24, 1972 (#72000925)	W of White Oak on SR 1351; 34°44′24″N 78°44′21″W	White Oak	
9	Mt. Horeb Presbyterian Church and Cemetery	Mt. Horeb Presbyterian Church and Cemetery	May 13, 1987 (#87000695)	SW corner of NC 87 and SR 1712 Jct. 34°30′58″N 78°27′02″W	Elizabethtown	
10	Oakland Plantation	Oakland Plantation	April 25, 1972 (#72000924)	Off SR 1730; 34°28′01″N 78°23′58″W	Carvers	
11	Purdie House and Purdie Methodist Church		April 13, 1977 (#77000989)	2.8 miles E of Tar Heel; 34°42′42″N 78°44′48″W	Tar Heel	
12	South River Presbyterian Church	South River Presbyterian Church	May 23, 1996 (#96000563)	NE side of NC 210, 1.7 miles SE of jct. with US 701; 34°43′48″N 78°24′03″W	Garland	
13	Trinity Methodist Church	Trinity Methodist Church	September 14, 1989 (#89001419)	Broad and Lower Sts. 34°37′42″N 78°36′11″W	Elizabethtown	
14	Walnut Grove		May 29, 1975 (#75001241)	E of Tar Heel on NC 87; 34°43′52″N 78°46′56″W	Tar Heel	

== See also ==
- National Register of Historic Places listings in North Carolina
- List of National Historic Landmarks in North Carolina
