= EYF =

EYF may refer to:

- Curtis L. Brown Jr. Field, in Bladen County, North Carolina, United States
- European Youth Forum
