= Tar Heel =

Nickname applied to the U.S. state of North Carolina or its inhabitants

Tar Heel (or Tarheel) is a nickname applied to the U.S. state of North Carolina and its people. It is also the nickname of athletic teams at the University of North Carolina. The origins of the nickname trace back to North Carolina's prominence—from the mid-18th century through the 19th century—as a producer of tar, pitch, turpentine, and other materials from its plentiful pine trees. "Tar Heel" (and a related version, "Rosin Heel") was often applied to the Poor White laborers who worked to produce tar, pitch, and turpentine. The nickname was embraced by Confederate North Carolina soldiers during the American Civil War, and it grew in popularity as a nickname for the state and its citizens following the war.

== History of the term ==
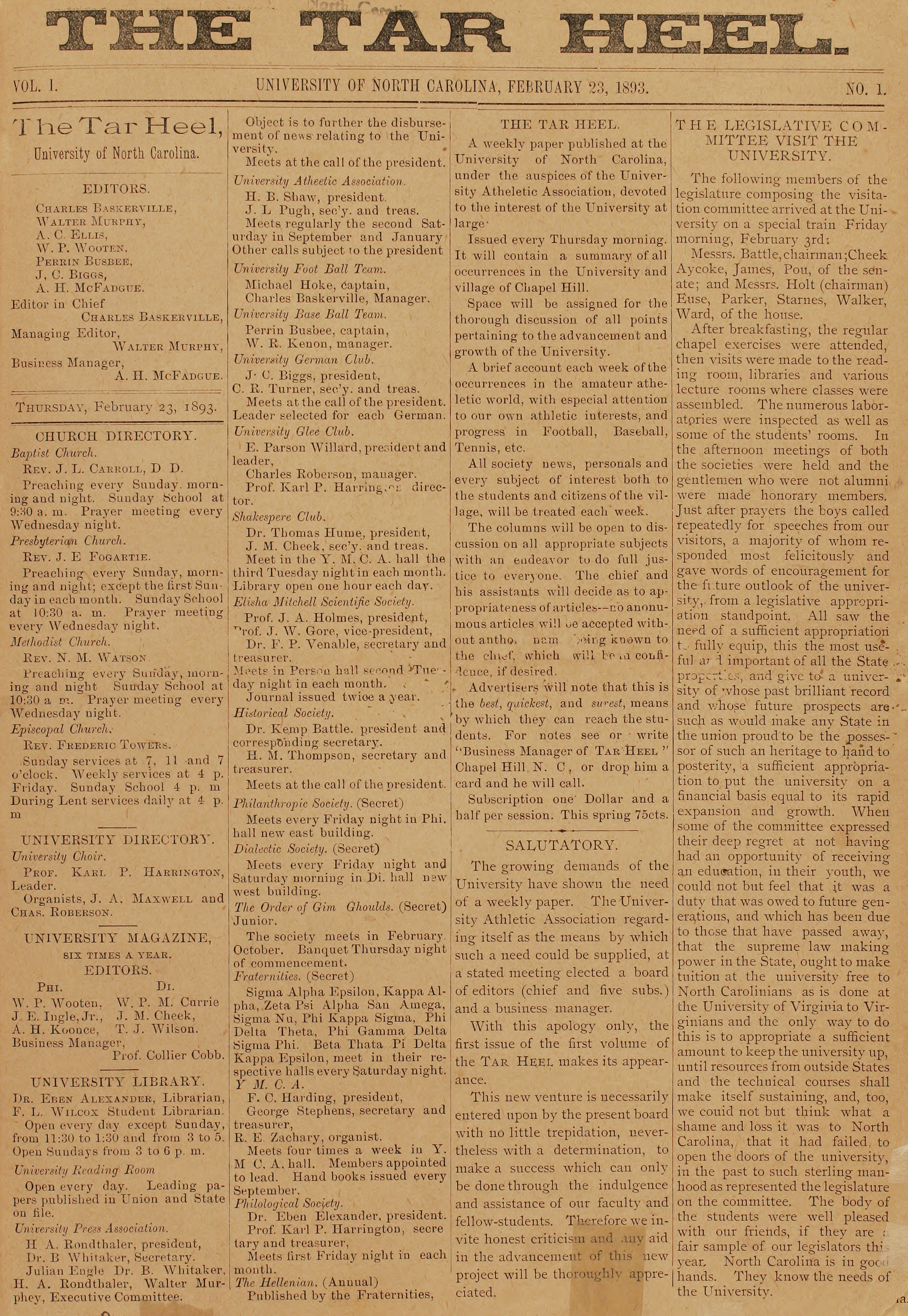
Front page of the first issue of The Tar Heel, published on 23 Feb 1893. The paper was later renamed The Daily Tar Heel.

In its early years as a colony, North Carolina became an important source of the naval stores of tar, pitch, and turpentine, especially for the Royal Navy. Tar and pitch were largely used to paint the bottoms of wooden ships, both to seal the ships and to prevent shipworms from damaging the hulls. Tar was created by piling up pine logs and burning them until hot oil seeped out from a spout.

Hugh Lefler and Albert Newsome claim in their North Carolina: the History of a Southern State (3rd edition, 1973) that North Carolina led the world in production of naval stores from about 1720 to 1870. At one time, an estimated 100,000 barrels (16,000 m^{3}) of tar and pitch were shipped from North Carolina to England every year. After 1824, North Carolina became the leader for naval stores in the United States. By the time the Civil War began in 1861, North Carolina had more than 1,600 turpentine distilleries. Two-thirds of all the turpentine in the United States came from North Carolina, and one-half came from the counties of Bladen and New Hanover.

The vast production of tar from North Carolina led many, including Walt Whitman, to give the derisive nickname of "Tarboilers" to the residents of North Carolina. North Carolina was nicknamed the "Tar and Turpentine State" because of this industry. These terms evolved until the nickname "Tar Heel" was being used to refer to residents of North Carolina. The term gained prominence during the American Civil War, when it had a mainly pejorative meaning. However, starting around 1865, the term began to be used by residents of North Carolina themselves as an expression of pride.

One of the earliest known references to the term in print came in 1863 in an article in a Raleigh newspaper in which a Confederate soldier from North Carolina is quoted:

The troops from other States call us “Tar Heels.” I am proud of the name, as tar is a sticky substance, and the “Tar Heels” stuck up like a sick kitten to a hot brick, while many others from a more oily State slipped to the rear, and left the “Tar Heels” to stick it out.

In 1893, the students of the University of North Carolina founded a newspaper and named it The Tar Heel, later renamed The Daily Tar Heel. By the early 1900s, the term had been embraced by many, both inside and outside the state, as a non-derisive term for North Carolinians.

The term “Tarheel” has been used in Washington state to refer to Southern Appalachian migrants (many of them from Western North Carolina) who came to the Cascade Mountain foothills for employment in the logging industry in the first half of the 20th century.

== Legendary explanations ==
The following legends and anecdotes attempt to explain the term's origin.

=== Revolutionary War ===
According to this legend, the troops of British Gen. Cornwallis during the American Revolutionary War were fording what is now known as the Tar River between Rocky Mount and Battleboro when they discovered that tar had been dumped into the stream to impede the crossing of British soldiers. When they finally got across the river, they found their feet completely black with tar. Thus, the soldiers observed that anyone who waded through North Carolina rivers would acquire "tar heels."

=== Civil War ===
The State of North Carolina was the next to last state to secede from the United States of America, and as a result the state was nicknamed "the reluctant state" by others in the south. The joke circulating around at the beginning of the war went something like: "Got any tar?" "No, Jeff Davis has bought it all." "What for?" "To put on you fellows' heels to make you stick." As the war continued, many North Carolinian troops developed smart replies to this term of ridicule: The 1st Texas Infantry lost its flag at Sharpsburg. As they were passing by the 6th North Carolina a few days afterward, the Texans called out, "Tar Heels!", and the reply was, "If'n you had had some tar on your heels, you would have brought your flag back from Sharpsburg."

Walter Clark offers a similar account in the third volume of his Histories of the Several Regiments from North Carolina in the Great War, asserting that the nickname came about when North Carolina troops held their ground during a battle in Virginia during the American Civil War while other supporting troops retreated. After the battle, supporting troops asked the victorious North Carolinians: "Any more tar down in the Old North State [North Carolina], boys?" and they replied: "No, not a bit; old Jeff's bought it all up." The supporting troops continued: "Is that so? What is he going to do with it?" The North Carolina troops' response: "He is going to put it on you'ns' heels to make you stick better in the next fight."

Likewise, Grandfather Tales of North Carolina History (1901) recounts,

During the late unhappy war between the States it [North Carolina] was sometimes called the "Tar-heel State," because tar was made in the State, and because in battle the soldiers of North Carolina stuck to their bloody work as if they had tar on their heels, and when General Lee said, "God bless the Tar-heel boys," they took the name. (p. 6)

An 1864 letter found in the North Carolina "Tar Heel Collection" in 1991 by North Carolina State Archivist David Olson supports this. A Col. Joseph Engelhard, describing the Battle of Ream's Station in Virginia, wrote: "It was a 'Tar Heel' fight, and ... we got Gen'l Lee to thanking God, which you know means something brilliant."

== Early known uses ==
- The earliest surviving written use of the term can be found in the diary of 2nd Lieutenant Jackson B. A. Lowrance, who wrote the following on February 6, 1863 while in Pender County, southeastern North Carolina: "I know now what is meant by the Piney Woods of North Carolina and the idea occurs to me that it is no wonder we are called 'Tar Heels'."
- After the Battle of Murfreesboro in Tennessee in early January 1863, John S. Preston of Columbia, S.C., the commanding general, rode along the fighting line commending his troops. Before the 60th Regiment from North Carolina, Preston praised them for advancing farther than he had anticipated, concluding with: "This is your first battle of any consequence, I believe. Indeed, you Tar Heels have done well."
- An August 1869 article in Overland Monthly magazine recounted an anecdote regarding "a brigade of North Carolinians, who, in one of the great battles (Chancellorsville, if I remember correctly) failed to hold a certain hill, and were laughed at by the Mississippians for having forgotten to tar their heels that morning. Hence originated their cant name 'Tarheels'."
- In a letter dated 1864 (in the North Carolina "Tar Heel Collection"), a Colonel Joseph Engelhard described the Battle of Ream's Station in Virginia. In it, he states: "It was a 'Tar Heel' fight, and ... we got Gen'l Lee to thanking God, which you know means something brilliant".
- North Carolina State Governor Vance said in one of his speeches to the troops: "I do not know what to call you fellows. I cannot say fellow soldiers, because I am not a soldier, nor fellow citizens, because we do not live in this state; so I have concluded to call you fellows Tar Heels."
- A piece of sheet music, "Wearin' of the Grey", identified as "Written by Tar Heel" and published in Baltimore in 1866, is probably the earliest printed use of Tar Heel.
- On New Year's Day, 1868, Stephen Powers set out from Raleigh on a walking tour that, in part, would trace in reverse the march of Gen. William T. Sherman at the end of the Civil War. As a part of his report on North Carolina, Powers described the pine woods of the state and the making of turpentine. Having entered South Carolina, he recorded in his 1872 book, Afoot & Alone, that he spent the night "with a young man, whose family were away, leaving him all alone in a great mansion. He had been a cavalry sergeant, wore his hat on the side of his head, and had an exceedingly confidential manner." "You see, sir, the Tar‑heels haven't no sense to spare," Powers quotes the sergeant as saying. "Down there in the pines the sun don't more'n half bake their heads. We always had to show 'em whar the Yankees was, or they'd charge to the rear, the wrong way, you see."
- In Congress on February 10, 1875, an African American representative from South Carolina stated that some whites were "the class of men thrown up by the war, that rude class of men I mean, the 'tar‑heels' and the 'sand‑hillers,' and the 'dirt eaters' of the South — it is with that class we have all our trouble...."
- Tar Heel was used in the 1884 edition of the Encyclopædia Britannica, which reported that the people who lived in the region of pine forests were "far superior to the tar heel, the nickname of the dwellers in barrens."
- In Congress in 1878, Rep. David B. Vance, trying to persuade the government to pay one of his constituents, J.C. Clendenin, for building a road, described Clendenin in glowing phrases, concluding with: "He is an honest man... he is a tar‑heel."
- In Pittsboro on December 11, 1879, the Chatham Record informed its readers that Jesse Turner had been named to the Arkansas Supreme Court. The new justice was described as "a younger brother of our respected townsman, David Turner, Esq., and we are pleased to know that a fellow tar‑heel is thought so much of in the state of his adoption."
- John R. Hancock of Raleigh wrote Sen. Marion Butler on January 20, 1899, to commend him for his efforts to obtain pensions for Confederate veterans. This was an action, Hancock wrote, "we Tar Heels, or a large majority of us, do most heartily commend."
- The New York Tribune stated on September 20, 1903, regarding some North Carolinians, that "the men really like to work, which is all but incomprehensible to the true 'tar heel'."
- On August 26, 1912, The New York Evening Post identified Josephus Daniels and Thomas J. Pence as two Tar Heels holding important posts in Woodrow Wilson's campaign.

== See also ==
- University of North Carolina at Chapel Hill
- Tar Heel, North Carolina
- Tarheel, North Carolina
- Tar River
- Tarboro
- Naval stores industry
