= Harmony Hall (White Oak, North Carolina) =

Historic house in North Carolina, United States

- U.S. National Register of Historic Places
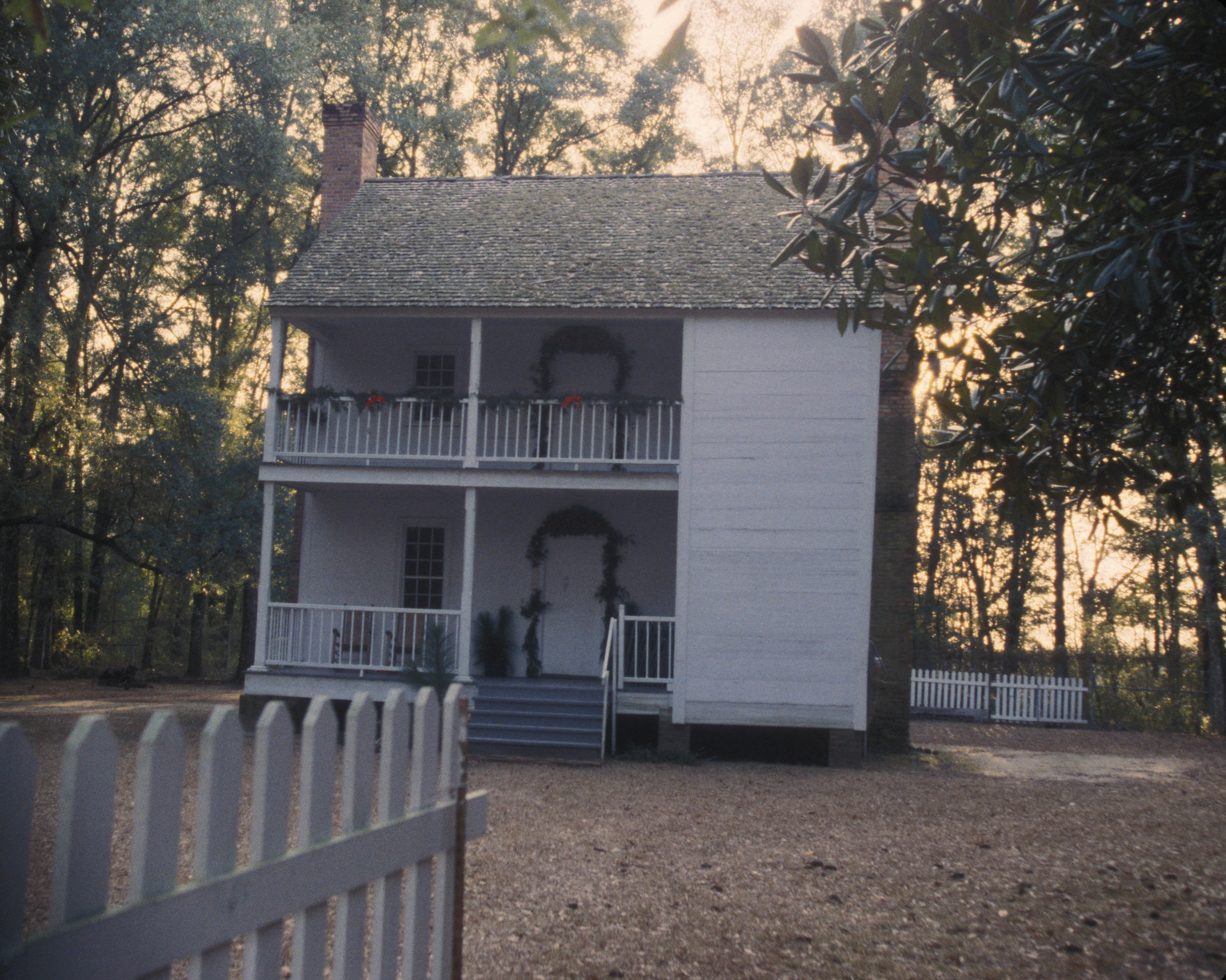

- Location within North Carolina Location within the United States
- Location: W of White Oak on SR 1351, near White Oak, North Carolina
- Coordinates: 34°44′13″N 78°44′46″W
- Area: 4 acres (1.6 ha)
- NRHP reference No.: 72000925
- Added to NRHP: March 24, 1972

Harmony Hall Plantation, located in White Oak, Bladen County, is one of the oldest residences in North Carolina

== History ==
Harmony Hall is a late 18th century home and was built by Col. James Richardson, who settled in Bladen County sometime prior to the American Revolution. Richardson received a large portion of land for his military service and the exact size of the land received is unknown. The land is on the banks of the Cape Fear River and was partially a grant from King George III for Col. Richardson's gallant service with General James Wolfe in the French and Indian War. The Colonel became interested in the land after he and his brother were shipwrecked off of Cape Hatteras and had to spend several months making repairs in Bladen County, NC before they could return to their home in Stonington, Connecticut. Col. Richardson fell in the love with the land and, after receiving a large tract of land their for his service, he built his home there, 12 miles (19 km) from Elizabethtown, NC and 1-mile (1.6 km) from the river. The building is frame built in a two-story Gabled style with two-story galleries, an unusually tall foundation with ventilation holes, and exterior stairs leading from the second story to a full attic. The interior is partially paneled with wide pine boards, some with chair-rails and some plastered above a paneled dado. The mantels are modeled after the Adam design. Shortly after completing the construction, Col. James was captured by the British army during the Revolutionary War and paroled. However, after learning of many British soldiers breaking their parole, he too broke his and re-enlisted in the American Army.

It was added to the National Register of Historic Places in 1972.

== Debunked: Cornwallis legend ==
In a local legend associated with the home, General Cornwallis used Harmony Hall as his headquarters for a time during his march to Wilmington, North Carolina. According to the legend, one night he and his staff were planning their campaign against General Greene in an upstairs bedroom when Mrs. Richardson crept up the exterior stairwell and eavesdropped through a hole in the ceiling, overhearing their plans. After creeping back down, she dispatched the plantation overseer to warn General Greene, allowing him to defeat Cornwallis. However, careful historical analysis has shown that although General Cornwallis marched within several miles of Harmony Hall, he was always on the opposite side of the Cape Fear River. There is no historical evidence to suggest that he crossed the river at any time. The legend may have some truth, as there is a chance that the Richardson ladies relocated during the war and had contact with General Cornwallis at some different location, but there is no way to determine this.

== After the Revolutionary War ==
Harmony Hall remained in the hands of the Richardson family until Col. James' grandson, Captain Edmund Richardson, moved to Texas and sold it to unknown parties in 1865. In 1874 it passed into the hands of the Layton family, who owned it from that point until 1962, when the property was given to the Bladen County Historical Society by N. Arthur Layton Jr., of Winter Haven, Florida as a memorial to his parents and Col. James A. Richardson.

The property is now in a 501c3 non-profit dedicated to the care and keeping of the house. The Harmony Hall Plantation Village Foundation was established after a split from the Bladen County Historical Society around 2016.

== Property and grounds ==
In addition to the home itself, there are several other buildings on the property. There is a schoolhouse, two restored country stores, a chapel, corn-crib, external kitchen, log cabin, and a gatehouse, which were not originally on the property and were relocated and restored. There is also a small house, the Wanda Campbell Cottage. A short way across the river is located the Purdie-Richardson family cemetery, although the property no longer belongs to the home.
