= Tar Heel, North Carolina =

- Town
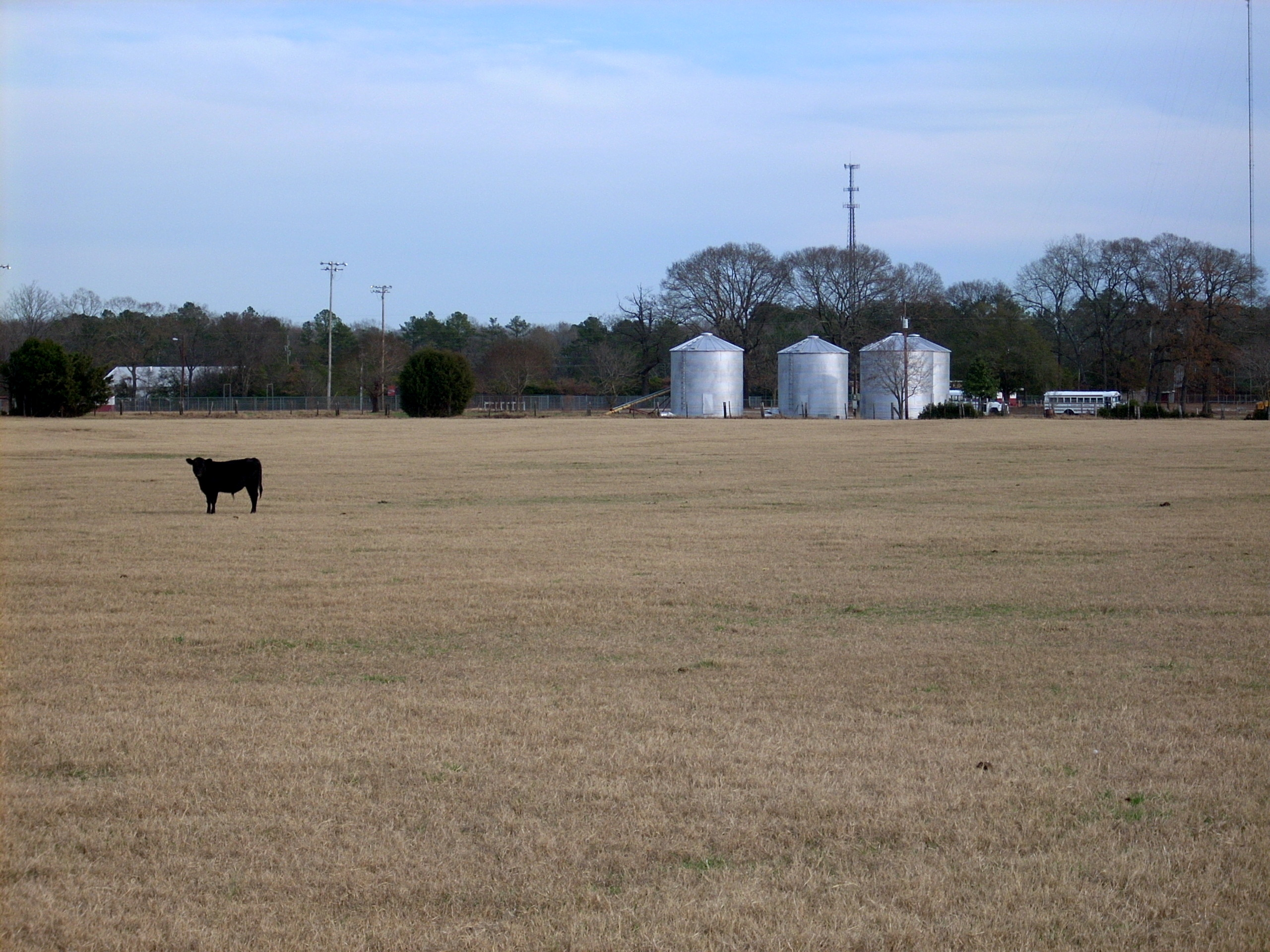
- A pasture on the edge of Tar Heel

- Location in Bladen County and the state of North Carolina.
- Coordinates: 34°44′02″N 78°47′27″W
- Country: United States
- State: North Carolina
- County: Bladen

Government
  - Type: Mayor–council government
  - Mayor: Sam Allen

Area
  - Total: 0.23 sq mi (0.60 km^{2})
  - Land: 0.23 sq mi (0.60 km^{2})
  - Water: 0 sq mi (0.00 km^{2})
- Elevation: 131 ft (40 m)

Population (2020)
  - Total: 90
  - Density: 388.2/sq mi (149.87/km^{2})
- Time zone: UTC-5 (Eastern (EST))
  - Summer (DST): UTC-4 (EDT)
- ZIP code: 28392
- Area codes: 910, 472
- FIPS code: 37-66740
- GNIS feature ID: 2406713

Tar Heel is a town located in Bladen County, North Carolina, United States. The population was 90 at the 2020 census.

Tar Heel is home to the largest pig processing plant in the world. The plant opened in 1992, operated by Smithfield Foods and is located just north of the town limits.

== Geography ==
Tar Heel is located on the banks of the Cape Fear River. Its major highways are NC 87 and NC 131. Fayetteville is 25 miles (40 km) to the north, Elizabethtown is 15 miles (24 km) to the southeast, and Lumberton is 16 miles (26 km) to the southwest.

According to the United States Census Bureau, the town has a total area of 0.15 square miles (0.4 km^{2}), all land.

== History ==
This farming community has a history dating back to the Revolutionary War. Colonel Thomas Robeson, for whom Robeson County was named, lived in the Tar Heel community. His home is located just to the east of the town. It is listed in the National Register of Historic Places as Walnut Grove.

The town of Mayville, no longer in existence, was on the Robeson and Bladen County line and was the village mentioned in the diary of Elizabeth Ellis Robeson (1847–1866). Just when the village moved to what is now Tar Heel is unknown. During the Civil War, Colonel Thomas Purdie and Captain Daniel Munn, residents of the Tar Heel area, led troops at Gettysburg and Fort Fisher.

The Town of Tar Heel was incorporated by the State of North Carolina in 1963.

The town was known for its landing on the Cape Fear River. The state operated a ferry at this landing, and it was a major loading point for vessels that transported agricultural goods to the market in Wilmington. The major product was barrels of turpentine. Tar Heel had several turpentine stills, and the remains of some of the old stills can be found in the area. The results of transporting the barrels of turpentine, leaking barrels, caused a tar-like material to be found around the landing and the access to the river. When the community people talked of going to the village, it was said they were going to get tar on their heels, thus the name Tar Heel.

The town of Tar Heel is often confused with Chapel Hill, North Carolina, home of the University of North Carolina Tar Heels.

The Purdie House and Purdie Methodist Church and Walnut Grove are listed on the National Register of Historic Places.

== Government ==
The town of Tar Heel is governed by a mayor/council governing body. The mayor and council are elected to four-year terms. The town's council meets monthly. In July 2011, the town of Tar Heel made world news when it was announced that no one was running for any of the four positions on the town board. The town held the election and Roy Dew was elected mayor of Tar Heel by write-in votes in November 2011. Also elected to the town's council by write-in votes were Angela Hall, Sam Allen, and Derek Druzak (2013). The Town Mayor is now Sam Allen; he was selected to serve the remainder of Dew's term, after the latter passed while in office. In 2021, Allen was elected to a full term as Mayor with Hall and Druzak re-elected to the town council by write-in, as well as Steve Dowless who was the only listed candidate for town council.

== Services ==
The services provided by this small rural community are:

- Street maintenance, sanitation pickup for residents, and street lights.
- Police protection is provided by the Bladen County Sheriff's Office.
- Fire protection is provided by the Tar Heel Rural Volunteer Fire Department.
- Water services are provided by the Tar Heel Water Corporation.

== Education ==
Public schools, part of the Bladen County School system, in the Tar Heel area:

- Plain View Elementary School and Tar Heel Middle School consolidated together to form Tar Heel School in 2024.
- Tar Heel High School consolidated with Bladenboro High School in 2001. The Tar Heel High School records show the school was originally built circa 1909.

== Churches ==
The greater Tar Heel community is home to these churches:

- Love Grove Baptist Church
- Tar Heel Baptist Church
- Tar Heel Free Will Church
- Beth Car Presbyterian – listed as a historic site
- Clark's Chapel
- New Life Ministry
- Purdie's Methodist – The oldest unaltered Methodist Church in North Carolina, National Register of Historic Places listings in Bladen County, North Carolina

== Demographics ==
Historical population
Census	Pop.	Note	%±
1970	87		—
1980	118		35.6%
1990	115		−2.5%
2000	70		−39.1%
2010	117		67.1%
2020	90		−23.1%
U.S. Decennial Census

As of the census of 2010, there are 117 people, 60 households, and 34 families residing in the town. The racial makeup of the town is majority White (93.2% or 107 persons). 5.1% (or 6 persons) are Mexican; and 3.4% (4 persons) are Native American with 2 people identifying solely as Native American and 2 others identifying as also White. There are 0.00% African American and 0.00% Asian or Pacific Islander.

== See also ==
- Tar Heel – an expression that was used during the Civil War and became the origin of the state's nickname – even though similar it is not the origin of the town's name.
- An American Trilogy (book) about the same piece of land in Tar Heel, site of decimation of aboriginal tribes by Christian settlers; a plantation where African-American slaves once worked; and now the site of factory farms for pigs, and the world's largest slaughterhouse.
