= Purdie House and Purdie Methodist Church =

Historic buildings in North Carolina, United States

- U.S. National Register of Historic Places
- Location within North Carolina Location within the United States
- Location: 2.8 miles E of Tar Heel, near Tar Heel, North Carolina
- Coordinates: 34°42′42″N 78°44′48″W
- Area: 60 acres (24 ha)
- Built: 1803–1806, c. 1845
- Architectural style: Greek Revival, Federal
- NRHP reference No.: 77000989
- Added to NRHP: April 13, 1977

Purdie House and Purdie Methodist Church is a historic home and Methodist church located near Tar Heel, Bladen County, North Carolina. The house was built about 1803–1806, and is a two-story, four bay by two bay, brick Federal-style dwelling. It has a steep gable roof and two-story gallery porches. Purdie Methodist Church is a mid-19th century temple-form Greek Revival-style frame building.

It was added to the National Register of Historic Places in 1977.
