= Mt. Horeb Presbyterian Church and Cemetery =

Historic site in Bladen County, North Carolina, US

- U.S. National Register of Historic Places
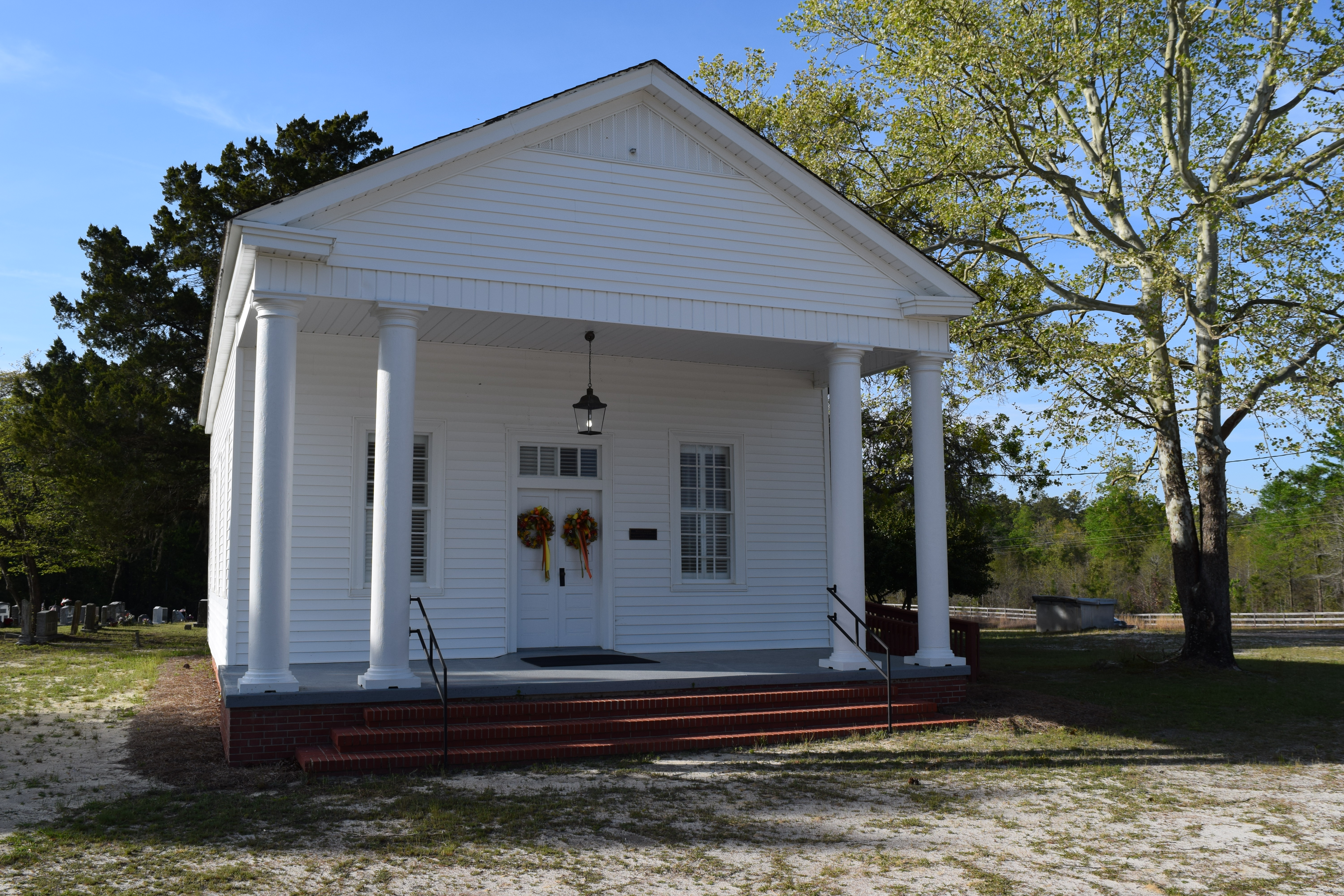

- Location within North Carolina Location within the United States
- Location: SW corner of NC 87 and SR 1712 Jct., near Elizabethtown, North Carolina
- Coordinates: 34°30′58″N 78°27′2″W
- Area: 6 acres (2.4 ha)
- Built: 1845
- Architect: Cromartie, George
- Architectural style: Greek Revival
- NRHP reference No.: 87000695
- Added to NRHP: May 13, 1987

Mt. Horeb Presbyterian Church and Cemetery is a historic Presbyterian church and cemetery located near Elizabethtown, Bladen County, North Carolina. It was built in 1845, and is a frame Greek Revival-style church with a pedimented front portico added in 1932.

It was added to the National Register of Historic Places in 1987.
