= Clarkton, North Carolina =

- Town
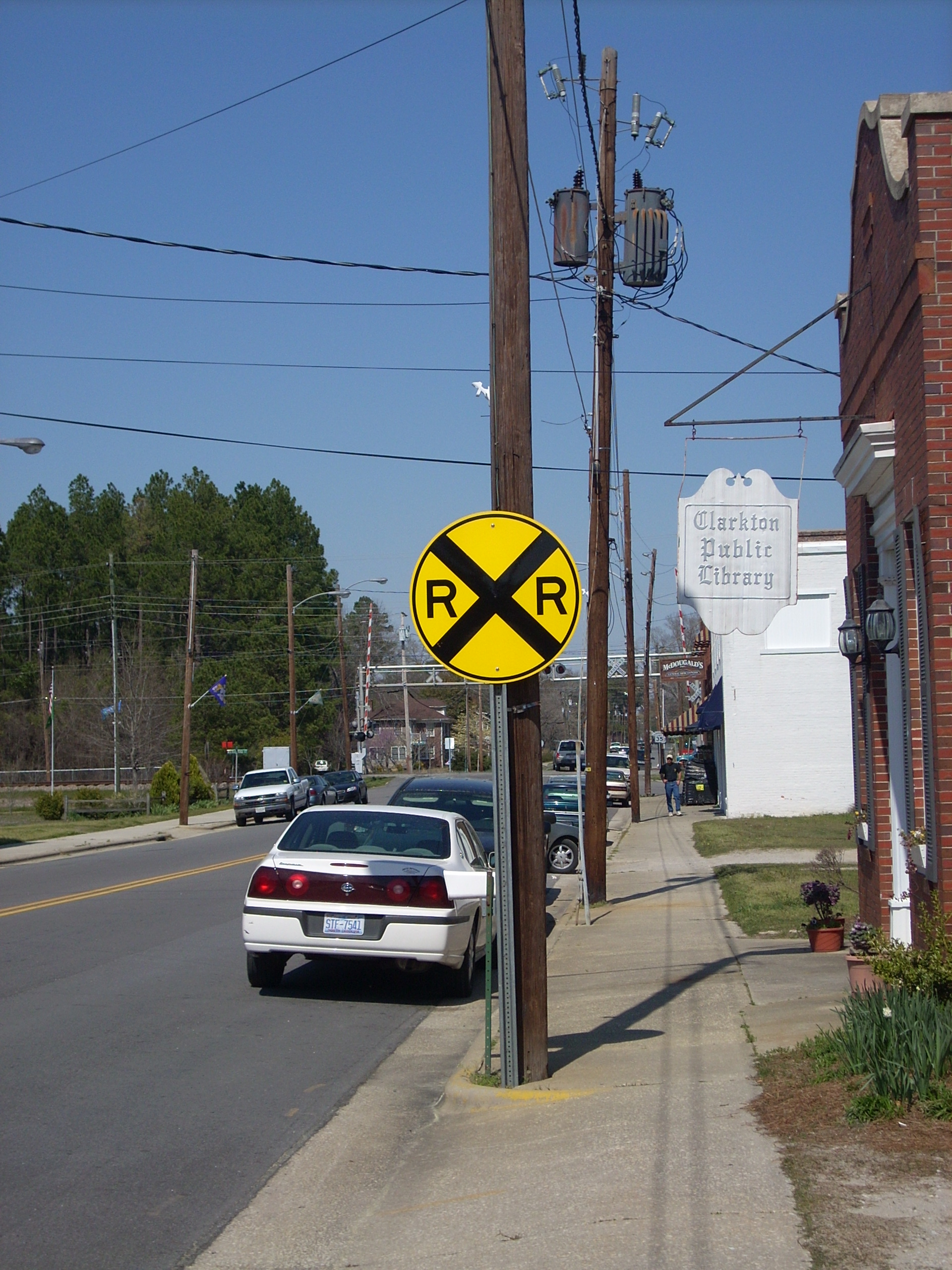
- A view of downtown Clarkton

- Seal

- Location in Bladen County and the state of North Carolina
- Coordinates: 34°29′21″N 78°39′21″W
- Country: United States
- State: North Carolina
- County: Bladen

Area
  - Total: 1.25 sq mi (3.24 km^{2})
  - Land: 1.25 sq mi (3.23 km^{2})
  - Water: 0.0077 sq mi (0.02 km^{2})
- Elevation: 85 ft (26 m)

Population (2020)
  - Total: 614
  - Density: 492.9/sq mi (190.31/km^{2})
- Time zone: UTC-5 (Eastern (EST))
  - Summer (DST): UTC-4 (EDT)
- ZIP code: 28433
- Area codes: 910, 472
- FIPS code: 37-12780
- GNIS feature ID: 2406272
- Website: townofclarkton.com

Clarkton is a town in Bladen County, North Carolina, United States. The population was 614 at the 2020 census.

== History ==
The Brown Marsh Presbyterian Church, John Hector Clark House, and Clarkton Depot are listed on the National Register of Historic Places. Clarkton was once home to former Lieutenant Governor James C. "Jimmy" Green.

== Geography ==
Clarkton is located at the crossroads of North Carolina Highway 211 and U.S. Route 701, 11 miles (18 km) south of Elizabethtown and the Cape Fear River. The closest town to Clarkton is Bladenboro, 8 miles (13 km) to the west on NC 211. Another important transit route that enters Clarkton is the CSX Railroad, that parallels North and South Railroad Streets through the town.

The town lies within the Carolina Border Belt, a regional network of tobacco markets and warehouses along both sides of the North Carolina-South Carolina border.

According to the United States Census Bureau, the town has a total area of 1.2 square miles (3.2 km^{2}), of which 0.008 square miles (0.02 km^{2}), or 0.57%, is water.

== Demographics ==
Historical population
| Census | Pop. | Note | %± |
|---|---|---|---|
| 1910 | 276 | | — |
| 1920 | 368 | | 33.3% |
| 1930 | 458 | | 24.5% |
| 1940 | 484 | | 5.7% |
| 1950 | 589 | | 21.7% |
| 1960 | 662 | | 12.4% |
| 1970 | 662 | | 0.0% |
| 1980 | 664 | | 0.3% |
| 1990 | 739 | | 11.3% |
| 2000 | 705 | | −4.6% |
| 2010 | 837 | | 18.7% |
| 2020 | 614 | | −26.6% |
U.S. Decennial Census

As of the census of 2000, there were 705 people, 285 households, and 176 families residing in the town. The population density was 630.1 people per square mile (243.3 people/km^{2}). There were 321 housing units at an average density of 286.9 per square mile (110.8/km^{2}). The racial makeup of the town was 64.68% White, 32.34% African American, 0.99% Native American, 1.42% from other races, and 0.57% from two or more races. Hispanic or Latino of any race were 4.68% of the population.

There were 285 households, out of which 29.1% had children under the age of 18 living with them, 37.5% were married couples living together, 21.1% had a female householder with no husband present, and 38.2% were non-families. 34.4% of all households were made up of individuals, and 16.8% had someone living alone who was 65 years of age or older. The average household size was 2.30 and the average family size was 2.95.

In the town, the population was spread out, with 25.0% under the age of 18, 6.1% from 18 to 24, 25.1% from 25 to 44, 27.7% from 45 to 64, and 16.2% who were 65 years of age or older. The median age was 41 years. For every 100 females, there were 84.1 males. For every 100 females age 18 and over, there were 80.5 males.

The median income for a household in the town was $22,206, and the median income for a family was $31,146. Males had a median income of $31,719 versus $25,764 for females. The per capita income for the town was $14,278. About 25.1% of families and 31.3% of the population were below the poverty line, including 57.5% of those under age 18 and 23.7% of those age 65 or over.
