= Trinity Methodist Church (Elizabethtown, North Carolina) =

Historic church in North Carolina, United States

- U.S. National Register of Historic Places
- U.S. Historic district
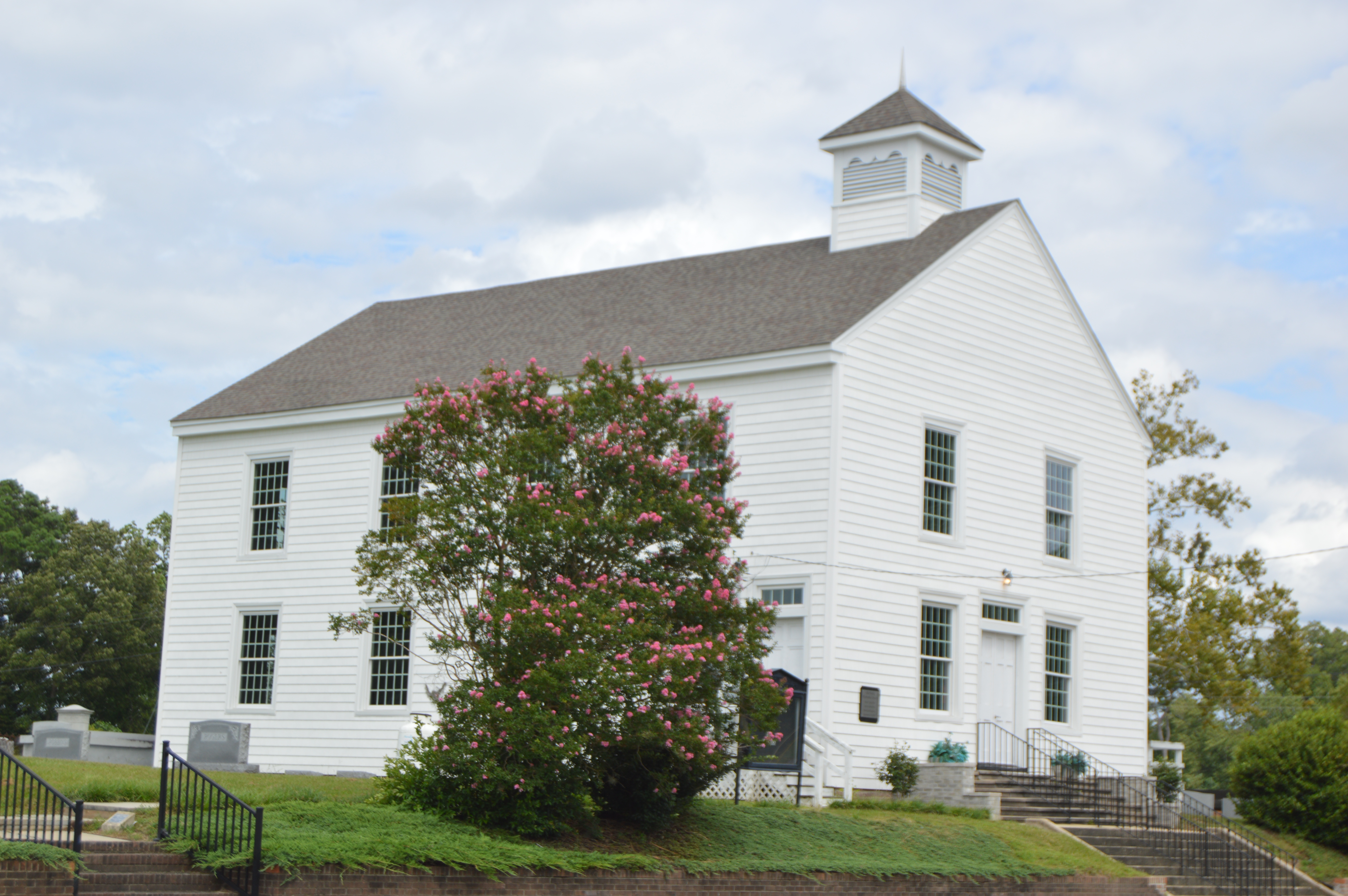
- Western side and front

- Location within North Carolina Location within the United States
- Location: Broad and Lower Sts., Elizabethtown, North Carolina
- Coordinates: 34°37′41″N 78°36′11″W
- Area: 1 acre (0.40 ha)
- Built: 1848
- Architectural style: Federal
- NRHP reference No.: 89001419
- Added to NRHP: September 14, 1989

Trinity Methodist Church, also known as Old Trinity Methodist Church, is a historic Methodist church and national historic district located at Broad and Lower Streets in Elizabethtown, Bladen County, North Carolina. It was built about 1848, and is a two-story, rectangular, frame Federal-style church. Surrounding the church on three sides is the church cemetery.

It was added to the National Register of Historic Places in 1989.
