= Bladen County Training School =

Historic school building in North Carolina, US

- U.S. National Register of Historic Places
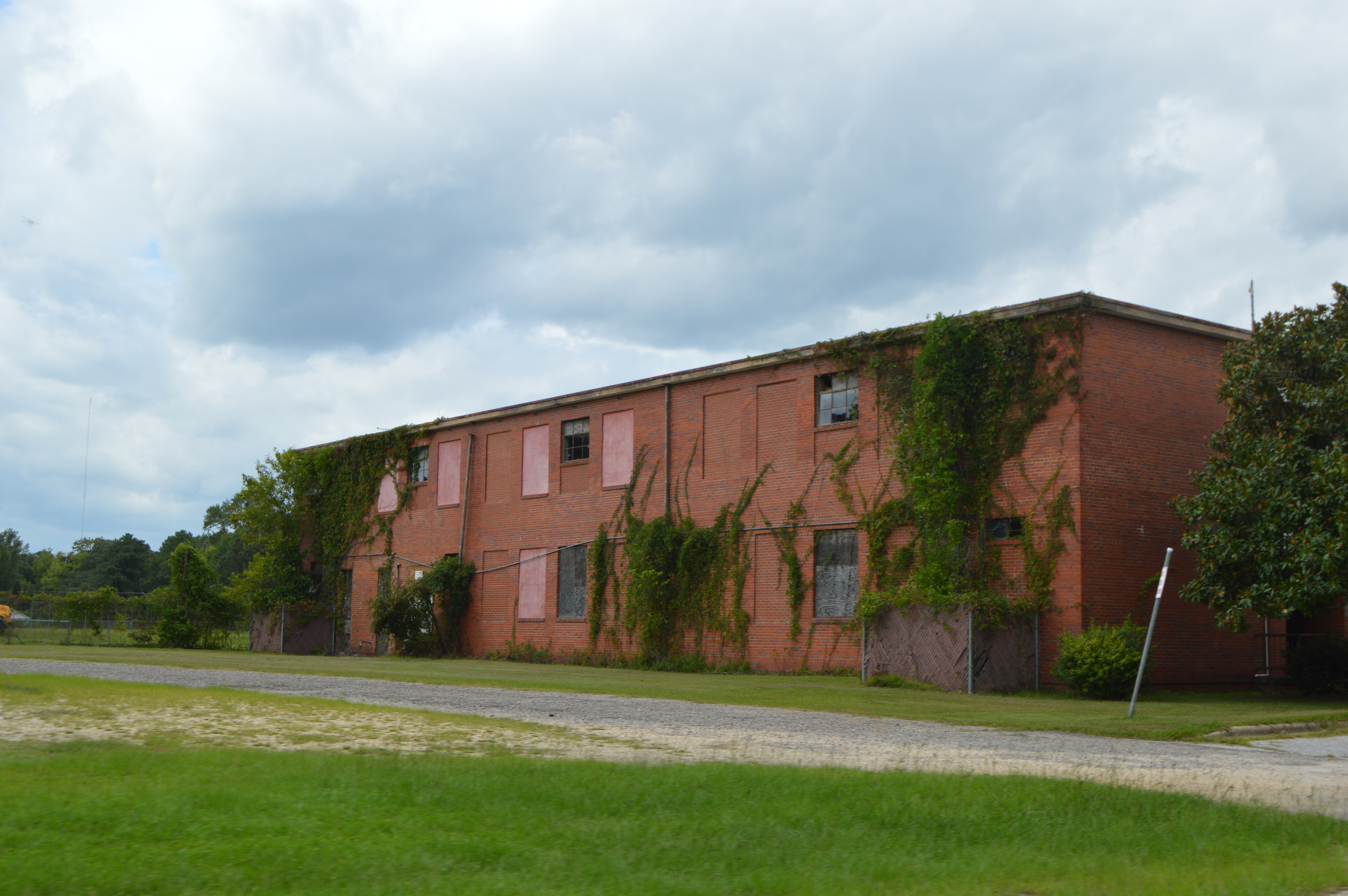
- The southern side of the high school building constructed in 1951.
- Location: Elizabethtown, North Carolina
- Built: 1928
- NRHP reference No.: 100002926
- Added to NRHP: 2019

The Bladen County Training School is a historic school located in Elizabethtown, North Carolina. It was the first high school for African Americans in Bladen County.

== History ==
In 1928, the school was constructed with support by the Rosenwald Fund Program.

The campus was enlarged with the addition of four classrooms in 1931 and an agricultural building in 1936. In 1948, a gymnasium was constructed. During the 1950s, the original school building was renovated with radiators, indoor bathrooms, and electricity. In 1951, a two-story building with eight classrooms was added to the campus to accommodate its growing student population.

In 1956, the school was renamed to Bladen Central High School. The school became desegregated in the 1970–1971. In 2002, the school closed and is now used as a community center.
