= White Oak, North Carolina =

- Census-designated place
- Location in Bladen County and the state of North Carolina.
- Coordinates: 34°44′41″N 78°45′07″W
- Country: United States
- State: North Carolina
- County: Bladen

Area
  - Total: 5.11 sq mi (13.23 km^{2})
  - Land: 5.11 sq mi (13.23 km^{2})
  - Water: 0 sq mi (0.00 km^{2})
- Elevation: 69 ft (21 m)

Population (2020)
  - Total: 346
  - Density: 67.7/sq mi (26.15/km^{2})
- Time zone: UTC-5 (Eastern (EST))
  - Summer (DST): UTC-4 (EDT)
- ZIP code: 28399
- Area codes: 910, 472
- FIPS code: 37-73320
- GNIS feature ID: 2403022

White Oak is a census-designated place (CDP) in Bladen County, North Carolina, United States. The population was 346 at the 2020 census.

== History ==
Desserette and Harmony Hall are listed on the National Register of Historic Places.

== Geography ==
According to the United States Census Bureau, the CDP has a total area of 5.1 square miles (13.2 km^{2}), all land.

== Demographics ==
Historical population
Census	Pop.	Note	%±
2020	346		—
U.S. Decennial Census

As of the census of 2000, there were 304 people, 107 households, and 81 families residing in the CDP. The population density was 62.3 inhabitants per square mile (24.1/km^{2}). There were 120 housing units at an average density of 24.6/sq mi (9.5/km^{2}). The racial makeup of the CDP was 60.53% White, 34.54% African American, 1.32% Native American, 2.96% from other races, and 0.66% from two or more races. Hispanic or Latino of any race were 5.59% of the population.

There were 107 households, out of which 38.3% had children under the age of 18 living with them, 60.7% were married couples living together, 11.2% had a female householder with no husband present, and 23.4% were non-families. 17.8% of all households were made up of individuals, and 11.2% had someone living alone who was 65 years of age or older. The average household size was 2.79 and the average family size was 3.20.

In the CDP, the population was spread out, with 27.0% under the age of 18, 8.9% from 18 to 24, 34.5% from 25 to 44, 18.8% from 45 to 64, and 10.9% who were 65 years of age or older. The median age was 32 years. For every 100 females, there were 104.0 males. For every 100 females age 18 and over, there were 109.4 males.

The median income for a household in the CDP was $41,000, and the median income for a family was $42,292. Males had a median income of $30,774 versus $28,750 for females. The per capita income for the CDP was $14,401. None of the families and 4.9% of the population were living below the poverty line, including no under eighteens and 22.2% of those over 64.
