= Brown Marsh Presbyterian Church =

Historic church in North Carolina, United States

- U.S. National Register of Historic Places
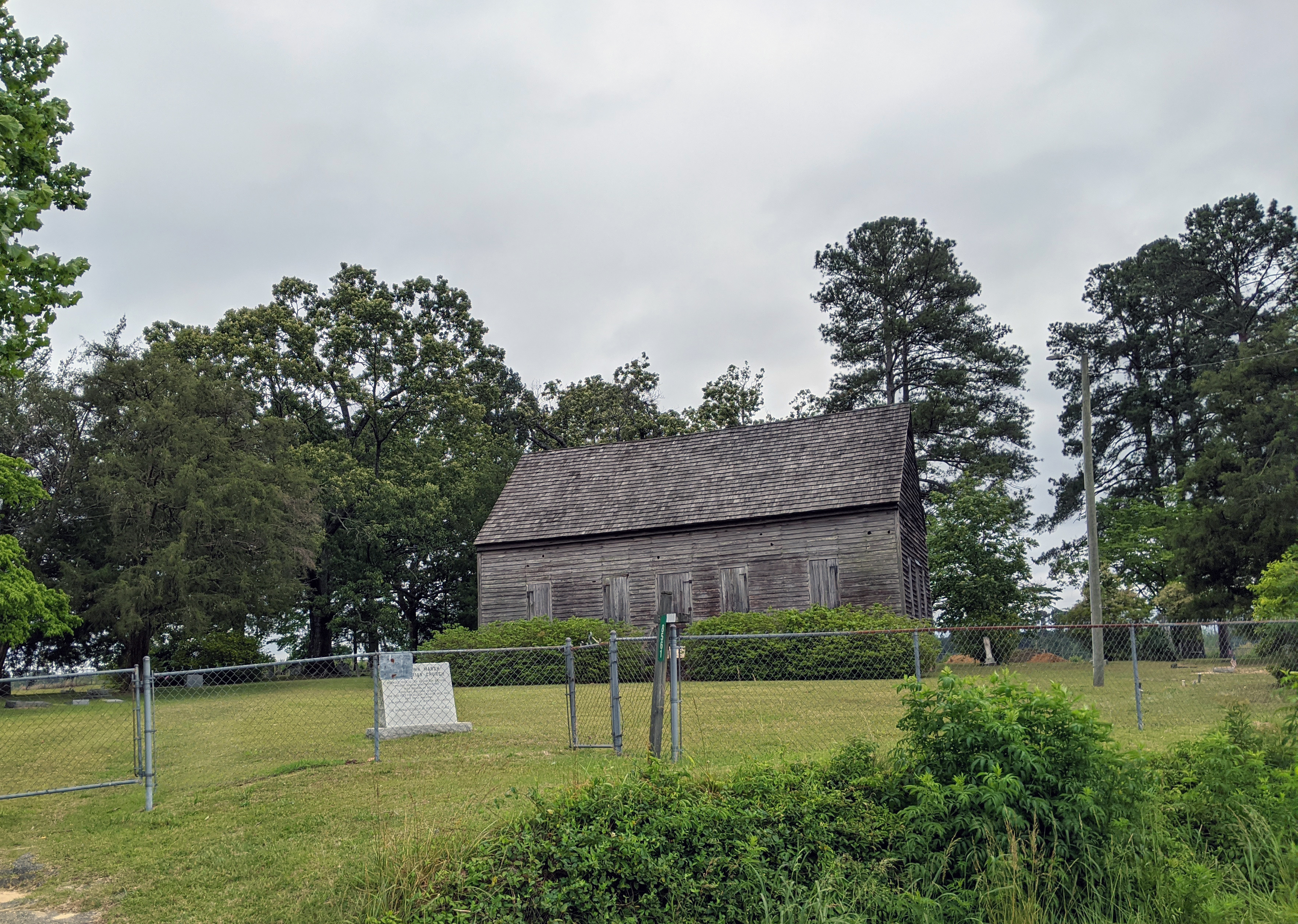

- Location within North Carolina Location within the United States
- Location: N of Clarkton on SR 1700 off SR 1762, near Clarkton, North Carolina
- Coordinates: 34°31′33″N 78°38′19″W
- Area: 9 acres (3.6 ha)
- Built: 1818
- Architect: Sheridan, Thomas
- Architectural style: Pre-Greek Revival
- NRHP reference No.: 75001239
- Added to NRHP: September 02, 1975

Brown Marsh Presbyterian Church, also known as Clarkton Presbyterian Church, is a historic Presbyterian church in Clarkton, Bladen County, North Carolina. The church was organized prior to 1755 by early Scottish settlers. The current building was built in 1818, and is a small frame pre-Greek Revival style building. It is the oldest church in Bladen County.

It was added to the National Register of Historic Places in 1975.
