= Clarkton station =

Historic train station in North Carolina, US

- Clarkton Depot
- U.S. National Register of Historic Places
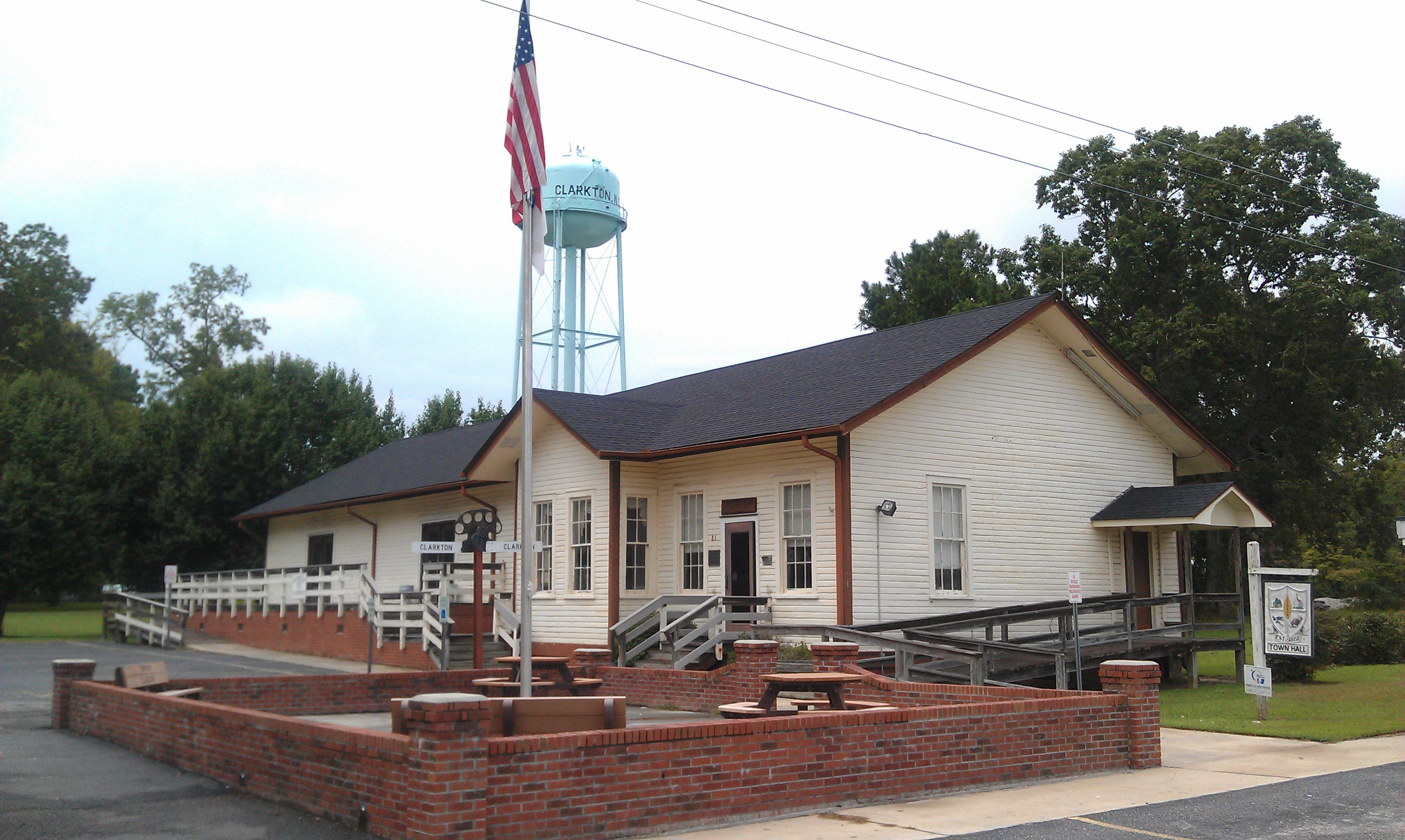
- Clarkton Depot, August 2011

- Location within North Carolina Location within the United States
- Location: Elm and Hester Sts., Clarkton, North Carolina
- Coordinates: 34°29′21″N 78°39′29″W
- Area: less than one acre
- Built: 1915
- NRHP reference No.: 86003463
- Added to NRHP: December 23, 1986

Clarkton Depot is a historic train station located at Clarkton, Bladen County, North Carolina. It was built as a passenger and freight station by the Seaboard Air Line Railroad in 1915. It is a one-story, rectangular frame building measuring 30 feet by 90 feet. The station served the SAL's daily passenger train from Wilmington to its Charlotte station in Charlotte via Hamlet and Monroe.

It was moved to the present site in October 1975. It was added to the National Register of Historic Places in 1987.

Preceding station	Seaboard Air Line Railroad	Following station
Abbottsburg toward Rutherfordton	Carolina Central Railroad	Rosindale toward Wilmington
