= Curtis L. Brown Jr. Field =

- IATA: none; ICAO: KEYF; FAA LID: EYF

Summary
- Airport type: Public
- Owner: Town of Elizabethtown
- Serves: Elizabethtown, North Carolina
- Elevation AMSL: 132 ft (40 m)
- Coordinates: 34°36′06″N 078°34′45″W
- Website: http://www.elizabethtownnc.org/index.asp?Type=B_BASIC&SEC={7AF00E3B-6DB2-4632-85E7-B06EC7338700

Map
- Location of airport in North Carolina

Runways
Direction	Length		Surface
Direction	ft	m	Surface
15/33	4,998	1,523	Asphalt

Statistics (2010)
- Aircraft operations: 14,500
- Based aircraft: 13
- Source: Federal Aviation Administration

Curtis L. Brown Jr. Field (ICAO: KEYF, FAA LID: EYF) is a town owned, public use airport located two nautical miles (4 km) southeast of the central business district of Elizabethtown, a town in Bladen County, North Carolina, United States. It is included in the National Plan of Integrated Airport Systems for 2011–2015, which categorized it as a general aviation facility.

Although many U.S. airports use the same three-letter location identifier for the FAA and IATA, this airport is assigned EYF by the FAA but has no designation from the IATA.

== Facilities and aircraft ==
Curtis L. Brown Jr. Field covers an area of 212 acres (86 ha) at an elevation of 132 feet (40 m) above mean sea level. It has one runway designated 15/33 with an asphalt surface measuring 4,998 by 75 feet (1,523 x 23 m).

For the 12-month period ending November 1, 2010, the airport had 14,500 aircraft operations, an average of 39 per day: 97% general aviation and 3% military. At that time there were 13 aircraft based at this airport: 77% single-engine, 15% multi-engine, and 8% helicopter.

== See also ==
- List of airports in North Carolina
