= Desserette =

Historic house in North Carolina, United States

- U.S. National Register of Historic Places
- U.S. Historic district
- Location within North Carolina Location within the United States
- Location: SW side of SR 1320 near jct. with SR 1318, near White Oak, North Carolina
- Coordinates: 34°47′57″N 78°46′13″W
- Area: 125.7 acres (50.9 ha)
- Built: c. 1840
- Architectural style: Greek Revival
- NRHP reference No.: 87001786
- Added to NRHP: October 7, 1987

Desserette is a historic plantation house and national historic district located near White Oak, Bladen County, North Carolina. The house was built about 1840, and is a two-story, frame double-pile house in the Greek Revival style. It rests on a brick pier foundation and has a hipped roof. Also on the property are the contributing kitchen, meathouse, log barn, and family cemetery.

It was added to the National Register of Historic Places in 1987.
