= Walnut Grove (Tar Heel, North Carolina) =

Historic house in North Carolina, United States

- U.S. National Register of Historic Places
- U.S. Historic district
- Location within North Carolina Location within the United States
- Location: E of Tar Heel on NC 87, near Tar Heel, North Carolina
- Coordinates: 34°43′52″N 78°46′56″W
- Area: 20 acres (8.1 ha)
- Built: c. 1855
- Architectural style: Greek Revival
- NRHP reference No.: 75001241
- Added to NRHP: May 29, 1975

Walnut Grove, also known as Robeson Plantation, is a historic plantation house complex and national historic district located near Tar Heel, Bladen County, North Carolina. The house was built about 1855, and is a two-story, frame house, five bays wide and four bays deep, in the Greek Revival style. The front and rear facades feature three bay double porches. Also on the property are the contributing dining dependency, kitchen, dairy, smokehouse, barn, well, cold frame, and scalding vat.

It was added to the National Register of Historic Places in 1975.
