= Elizabethtown, North Carolina =

- Town
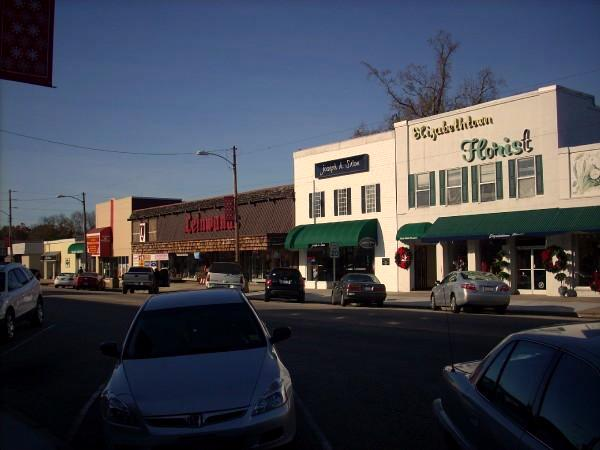
- A view of Broad Street

- Seal
- Nickname(s): E'Town, E-Town
- Interactive map of Elizabethtown
- Location within the state of North Carolina Location within the United States
- Coordinates: 34°37′19″N 78°36′27″W
- Country: United States
- State: North Carolina
- County: Bladen
- Township: Elizabethtown
- Established: 1773
- Incorporated: 1895

Government
  - Type: Council-manager government
  - Mayor: Sylvia Campbell

Area
  - Total: 5.11 sq mi (13.24 km^{2})
  - Land: 5.07 sq mi (13.13 km^{2})
  - Water: 0.042 sq mi (0.11 km^{2})
- Elevation: 118 ft (36 m)

Population (2020)
  - Total: 3,296
  - Density: 650.2/sq mi (251.05/km^{2})
- Time zone: UTC-5 (Eastern (EST))
  - Summer (DST): UTC-4 (EDT)
- ZIP code: 28337
- Area codes: 910, 472
- FIPS code: 37-20600
- GNIS feature ID: 2406434
- Website: www.elizabethtownnc.org

Elizabethtown is a town in and the county seat of Bladen County, North Carolina, United States. The population was 3,296 at the 2020 census. Elizabethtown was chartered in 1773 on the west banks of the Cape Fear River, approximately halfway between Fayetteville and Wilmington, North Carolina. Tory Hole Park in downtown Elizabethtown was the site of the Battle of Elizabethtown, a pivotal victory for the Patriots in the American Revolutionary War that ended Loyalist control of the region. A former river port that primarily exported Naval stores and lumber, Elizabethtown is now a regional industrial and manufacturing hub centered around the Elizabethtown Airport Industrial Park, with many natural attractions that attract visitors year-round.

== History ==
=== Pre-colonial and colonial era ===
The earliest known inhabitants of the region were the Waccamaw, a Native American tribe that lived along rivers such as the Cape Fear. Following the removal of native tribes in the region during the Tuscarora and Yamasee wars, the North Carolina General Assembly established Bladen Precinct (later Bladen County) in 1734 to govern the land west of New Hanover Precinct. The newly formed county soon experienced an influx of Highland Scots immigrants, who were encouraged to settle the region by Royal Governor Gabriel Johnston through multi-year tax exemptions. The Scottish constructed small farms and homes along the river basins, harvesting and trading naval stores such as pine tar and turpentine using the river. A courthouse was built in 1738 in a settlement named Elizabeth, located 3.5 miles (5.6 km) upstream from the modern town, surrounded by farms and plantations. A fire in the late 1760s destroyed Elizabeth and its courthouse, along with its records, forcing landowners to re-record any lost documents and leaving the county's earliest archives permanently out of order.

After the destruction of Elizabeth, the settlement shifted downstream to a series of high bluffs on the Cape Fear's west bank. In November 1773, the North Carolina General Assembly officially chartered the settlement as "Elizabethtown" on a 100-acre (40 ha) tract of land transferred from Isaac Jones, who operated a ferry crossing in the area. The act—"An Act for establishing a Town on the Land of Isaac Jones"—entrusted the land to a board of five appointed directors and trustees: Walter Gibson, William Salter, James White, James Bailey, and Benjamin Humphrey. The trustees divided the tract into a grid consisting of 120 half-acre lots, which were sold to the public for 40 shillings per lot. The charter also mandated that three acres of the tract be set aside for public civic infrastructure, including a new Bladen County courthouse, gaol (jail), and workhouse. However, the outbreak of the American Revolution would delay construction for over a decade.

==== Etymology ====
The exact etymology of Elizabethtown is debated among local historians. Theories about the town's eponym include:

- The "sweetheart of Isaac Jones," whose land the town was built on.
- Queen Elizabeth I of England.
- Elizabeth Carteret, the wife of Sir George Carteret, one of the original Lords Proprietors for the Carolina Colony.
- The original upriver settlement of Elizabeth, which had burned just a few years prior.

=== Revolutionary War ===
During the American Revolutionary War, the Cape Fear region saw many skirmishes between local Patriot (Whigs) and Loyalist (Tories) forces. After seizing control of Wilmington in 1781, Loyalist forces began to drive out local Patriots from their homes across the Cape Fear region. Sallie Salter, wife of William Saltar, entered the Loyalist garrison in Elizabethtown under the guise of selling eggs. She brought crucial information about the encampment back to the Patriots, allowing them to plan an attack. On the night of August 27, 1781, a group of roughly 60 Patriot militiamen launched a surprise attack on the garrison, forcing over 300 Loyalists to retreat into a deep ravine near the riverbank, known today as "Tory Hole." The Patriot victory marked the end of Loyalist control of the region, allowing the town to stabilize and grow after the war.

The battlefield has since been preserved as Tory Hole Park and features a small amphitheater, playground, and fitness trails. It frequently hosts local historical commemorations and living history reenactments.

=== 19th Century ===
In 1800, the wood-frame courthouse caught fire, destroying almost all colonial-era county records aside from land deeds. A replacement wooden courthouse was constructed in 1802 on the public square. In the antebellum era, Elizabethtown developed into a small agricultural port along the Cape Fear River shipping route. Steamboat traffic between Wilmington and Fayetteville allowed local merchants and plantation owners to export agricultural goods and naval stores to nearby cities. To facilitate trade, several private river landings, docks, and warehouses were constructed along the town's bluffs, making the waterfront the center of local commerce.

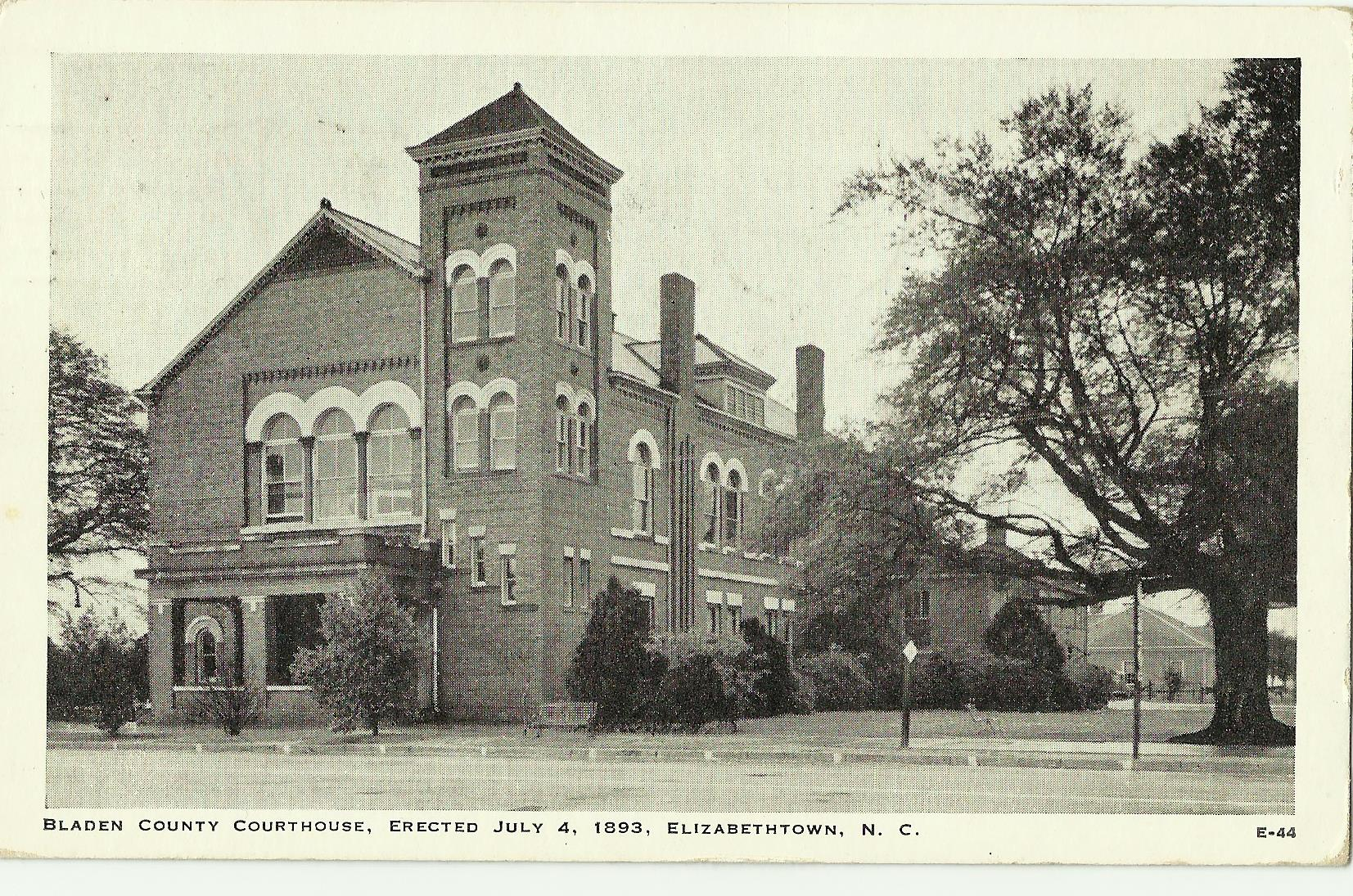
Bladen County's third courthouse, in use from 1893–1925

In the American Civil War, Elizabethtown remained isolated from military engagements and campaigns, though hundreds of men from the area would serve the Confederacy across the East Coast. In the Reconstruction era, new railroads were built in southern Bladen County, going through the towns of Abbottsburg, Bladenboro, Clarkton, and Council. The railroads redirected much of the region's economic growth away from Elizabethtown and more toward the county's southern border. In 1893, the brick courthouse meant to replace the 1802 structure caught fire, burning almost all of the county's antebellum and Civil War-era records. A replacement courthouse was built the following year. It was enlarged and eventually demolished in 1925, and the current courthouse was built in its place in 1965. Because the courthouse fires resulted in the repeated loss of public records, a permanent archival gap significantly limits the availability of sources for the town's early history.

=== 20th Century ===
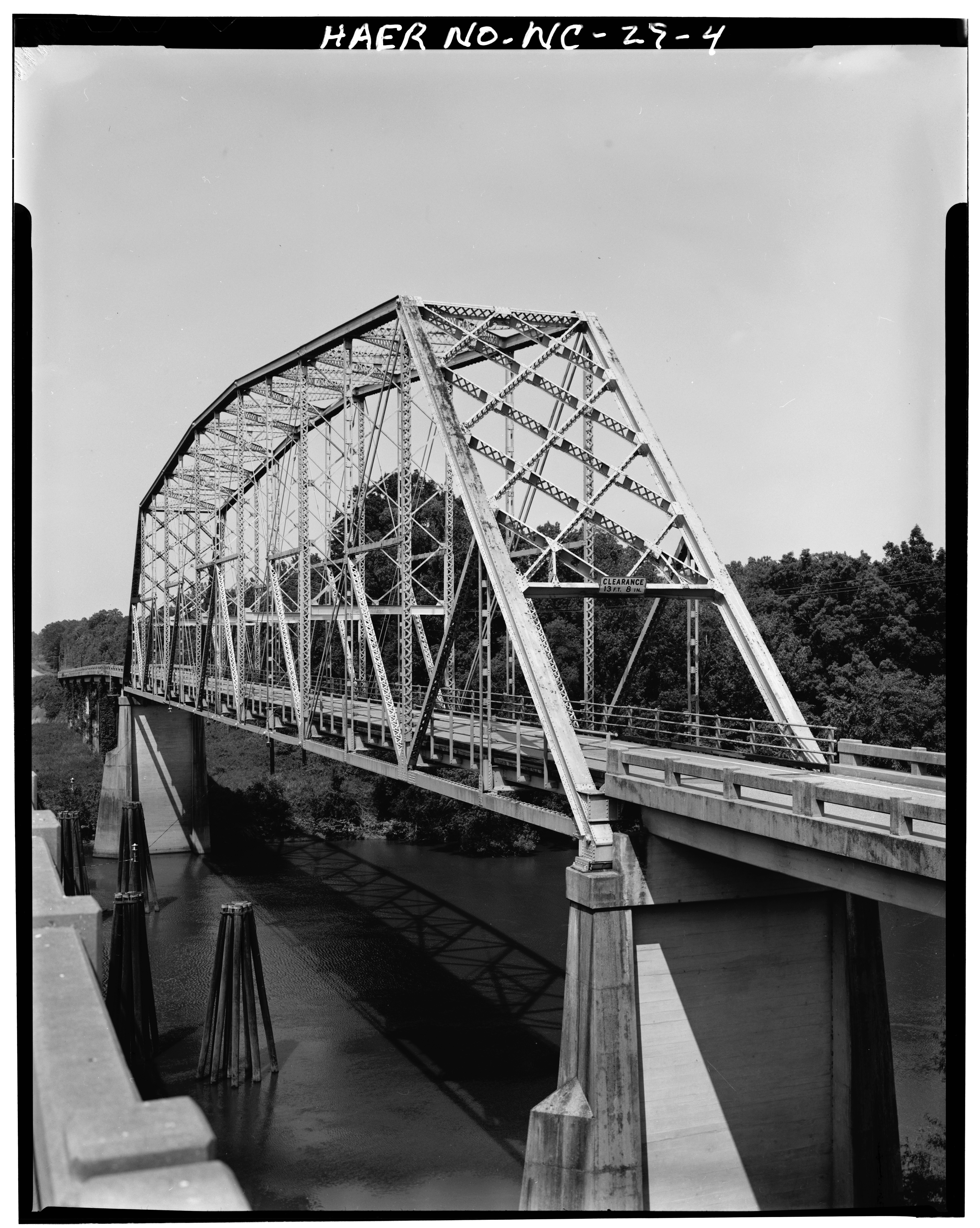
McGirt's bridge spanning the Cape Fear River in Elizabethtown. In operation from 1925–1984.

1911 saw the construction of a Virginia and Carolina Southern Railroad line extending from St. Pauls to Elizabethtown. In the early 1900s, the US Army Corps of Engineers constructed three locks and dams between Fayetteville and Navassa with the goal of keeping the river navigable for commercial ships year-round. One of these dams–Lock and Dam No. 2–was completed in 1917 at Brown's Landing in Elizabethtown. The town's infrastructure expanded further in 1925 with the construction of the McGirt Bridge spanning the Cape Fear River. The new bridge, which replaced the old ferry crossing, completed a vital missing link in the state's north-south highway system. The McGirt bridge was also the first permanent structure to link the northern and southern halves of Bladen County, granting residents easy access to Elizabethtown from both sides of the Cape Fear.

In the late 1930s, the federal Resettlement Administration turned over its land around the Carolina bays to the state, resulting in the creation of Jones Lake State Park. The park opened in 1939, and was the first North Carolina State Park to be opened to African Americans in the Segregation era. The park soon became a tourist destination and recreational center for African Americans across the Cape Fear region.

In the mid-1900s, Elizabethtown's economy shifted from naval stores to agriculture, lumber, and textiles. The town gained national attention in 1948, when over 200 African American workers went on strike against the Greene Brothers Lumber Company, the largest employer in the region. The strike was part of Operation Dixie, an effort led by the Congress of Industrial Organizations to challenge the Jim Crow laws in place in the region. Following the Civil Rights Movement, the Bladen County Training School was desegregated in 1970, and incorporated into the county's public school system later that year. The 1970s also saw the rise of manufacturing and industrial plants in the area, resulting in Elizabethtown's highest population growth, going from 1,418 residents in 1970 to 3,551 in 1980.

In 1984, the aging McGirt bridge was demolished and replaced by a new bridge designed to carry U.S. Highway 701. The municipal airport was also updated and renamed to Curtis L. Brown Jr. Field, after the native pilot and astronaut. The 1990s also saw the closure of the Lock and Dam system, marking an end to the town's river trading economy. Today, the dam serves as a water pool management system and park.

=== Modern Day ===
Today, Elizabethtown maintains its traditional rural foundation while slowly expanding its industrial sector. Agribusiness remains a substantial part of Elizabethtown's identity, with nearby Smithfield Foods pork processing facility in Tar Heel employing over 44% of the county's workforce. The town has also shifted focus toward manufacturing and localized economic incentives. This strategy is centered around the Elizabethtown Airport Industrial Park, which surrounds Curtis L. Brown Jr. Field. The facility supports food processing, electronic assembly, and emergency medical service operations, with plans to expand to bio-scientific and technical component manufacturing firms in the near future. The Elizabethtown-White Lake Chamber of Commerce also encourages visitors and tourists to visit the many state parks, trails, and lakes surrounding the town, using the nickname "Mother Nature's Playground" in promotional material for the area.

=== National Register of Historic Places ===
The Bladen County Training School, Mt. Horeb Presbyterian Church and Cemetery, and Trinity Methodist Church are listed on the National Register of Historic Places.

== Geography ==
According to the United States Census Bureau, Elizabethtown has a total area of 4.7 square miles (12.1 km^{2}), of which 4.6 square miles (12.0 km^{2}) is land and 0.039 square miles (0.1 km^{2}), or 0.73%, is water. Browns Creek, a tributary to the Cape Fear River, drains the south side of the town.

The Bladen Lakes State Forest, located just north of the town limits, is the largest state-owned forest in North Carolina, covering 33,450 acres (13,540 ha).

Elizabethtown is located in the center of the Bladen Lakes region, a region characterized by its high concentration of water-filled Carolina bays and acidic pocosins. The town acts as a gateway to many natural points of interest, including Jones Lake State Park, located 4 miles (6.4 km) to the north; Singletary Lake State Park, located 9 miles (14 km) to the southeast; and the seasonal resort town of White Lake, located 6 miles (9.7 km) to the east.

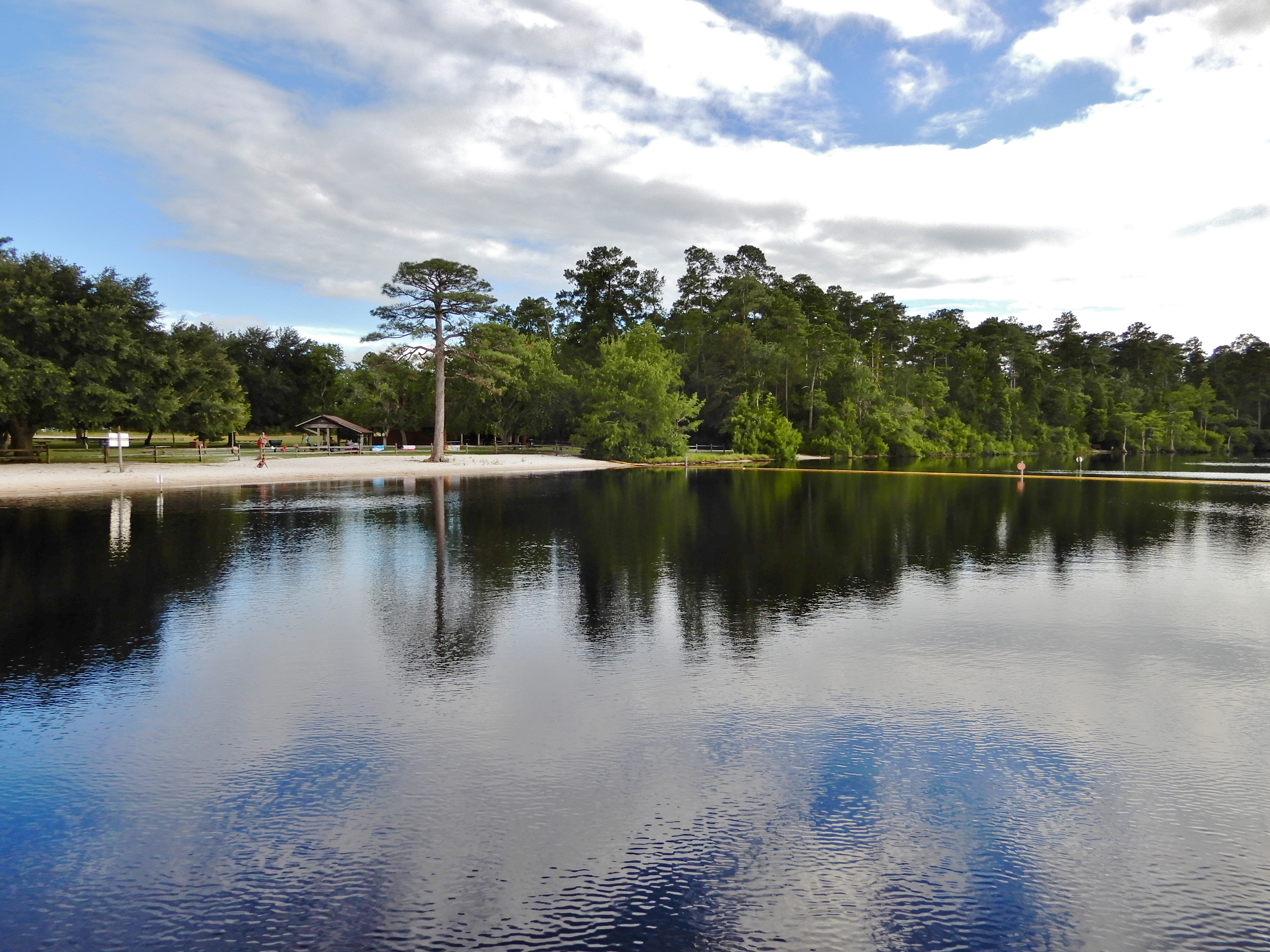
A sandy beach used for swimming at Jones Lake State Park.

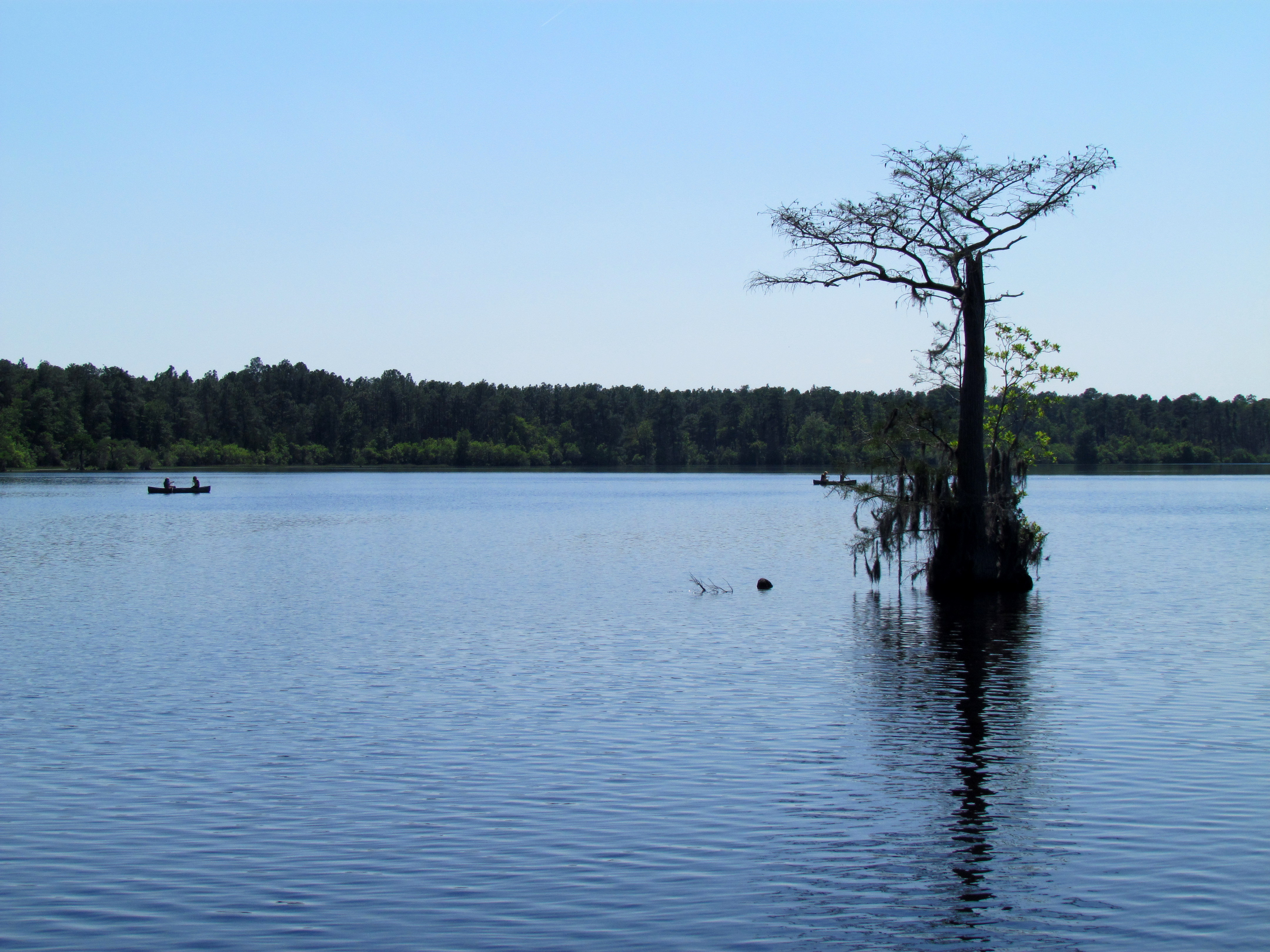
A lone tree with a kayaker in the background at Singletary Lake State Park.

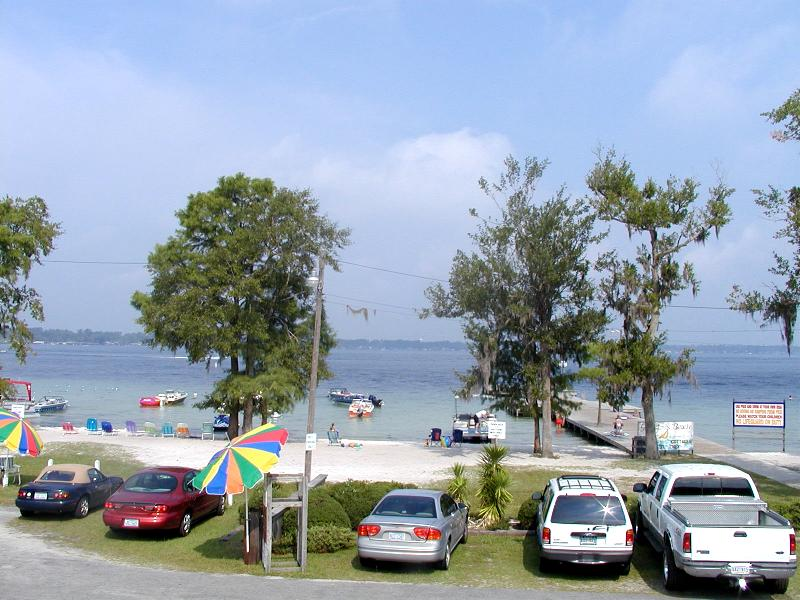
A public beach at White Lake.

=== Climate ===
Elizabethtown has a humid subtropical climate (Köppen: Cfa) with long, hot summers and short, cool to mild winters.

Climate data for Elizabethtown, North Carolina, 1991–2020 normals, extremes 1946–2021
Month	Jan	Feb	Mar	Apr	May	Jun	Jul	Aug	Sep	Oct	Nov	Dec	Year
Record high °F (°C)	81 (27)	85 (29)	91 (33)	94 (34)	96 (36)	101 (38)	103 (39)	105 (41)	101 (38)	95 (35)	89 (32)	82 (28)	105 (41)
Mean maximum °F (°C)	73.4 (23.0)	76.2 (24.6)	82.3 (27.9)	86.5 (30.3)	91.3 (32.9)	95.6 (35.3)	97.0 (36.1)	96.4 (35.8)	91.4 (33.0)	85.8 (29.9)	79.1 (26.2)	74.8 (23.8)	98.7 (37.1)
Mean daily maximum °F (°C)	54.4 (12.4)	58.7 (14.8)	66.2 (19.0)	74.6 (23.7)	81.5 (27.5)	87.4 (30.8)	91.0 (32.8)	88.5 (31.4)	83.6 (28.7)	74.8 (23.8)	64.7 (18.2)	57.7 (14.3)	73.6 (23.1)
Daily mean °F (°C)	43.0 (6.1)	46.2 (7.9)	53.2 (11.8)	61.7 (16.5)	69.7 (20.9)	76.8 (24.9)	80.8 (27.1)	78.8 (26.0)	73.6 (23.1)	63.1 (17.3)	52.5 (11.4)	46.3 (7.9)	62.1 (16.7)
Mean daily minimum °F (°C)	31.6 (−0.2)	33.7 (0.9)	40.2 (4.6)	48.8 (9.3)	57.8 (14.3)	66.3 (19.1)	70.5 (21.4)	69.0 (20.6)	63.6 (17.6)	51.5 (10.8)	40.3 (4.6)	35.0 (1.7)	50.7 (10.4)
Mean minimum °F (°C)	16.4 (−8.7)	20.9 (−6.2)	25.1 (−3.8)	34.5 (1.4)	44.7 (7.1)	56.2 (13.4)	63.2 (17.3)	60.9 (16.1)	52.7 (11.5)	36.1 (2.3)	26.9 (−2.8)	21.7 (−5.7)	15.0 (−9.4)
Record low °F (°C)	−3 (−19)	8 (−13)	13 (−11)	24 (−4)	32 (0)	44 (7)	53 (12)	50 (10)	41 (5)	21 (−6)	16 (−9)	−3 (−19)	−3 (−19)
Average precipitation inches (mm)	3.73 (95)	3.48 (88)	3.91 (99)	3.55 (90)	4.05 (103)	5.08 (129)	5.33 (135)	6.56 (167)	6.89 (175)	3.70 (94)	3.62 (92)	3.38 (86)	53.28 (1,353)
Average snowfall inches (cm)	0.3 (0.76)	0.5 (1.3)	0.0 (0.0)	0.0 (0.0)	0.0 (0.0)	0.0 (0.0)	0.0 (0.0)	0.0 (0.0)	0.0 (0.0)	0.0 (0.0)	0.0 (0.0)	0.0 (0.0)	0.8 (2.06)
Average precipitation days (≥ 0.01 in)	10.8	9.6	10.0	8.2	8.7	9.6	11.3	11.1	9.9	7.3	7.6	10.4	114.5
Average snowy days (≥ 0.1 in)	0.1	0.1	0.0	0.0	0.0	0.0	0.0	0.0	0.0	0.0	0.0	0.0	0.2
Source: NOAA (snow/snow days 1981–2010)

=== Extreme weather ===
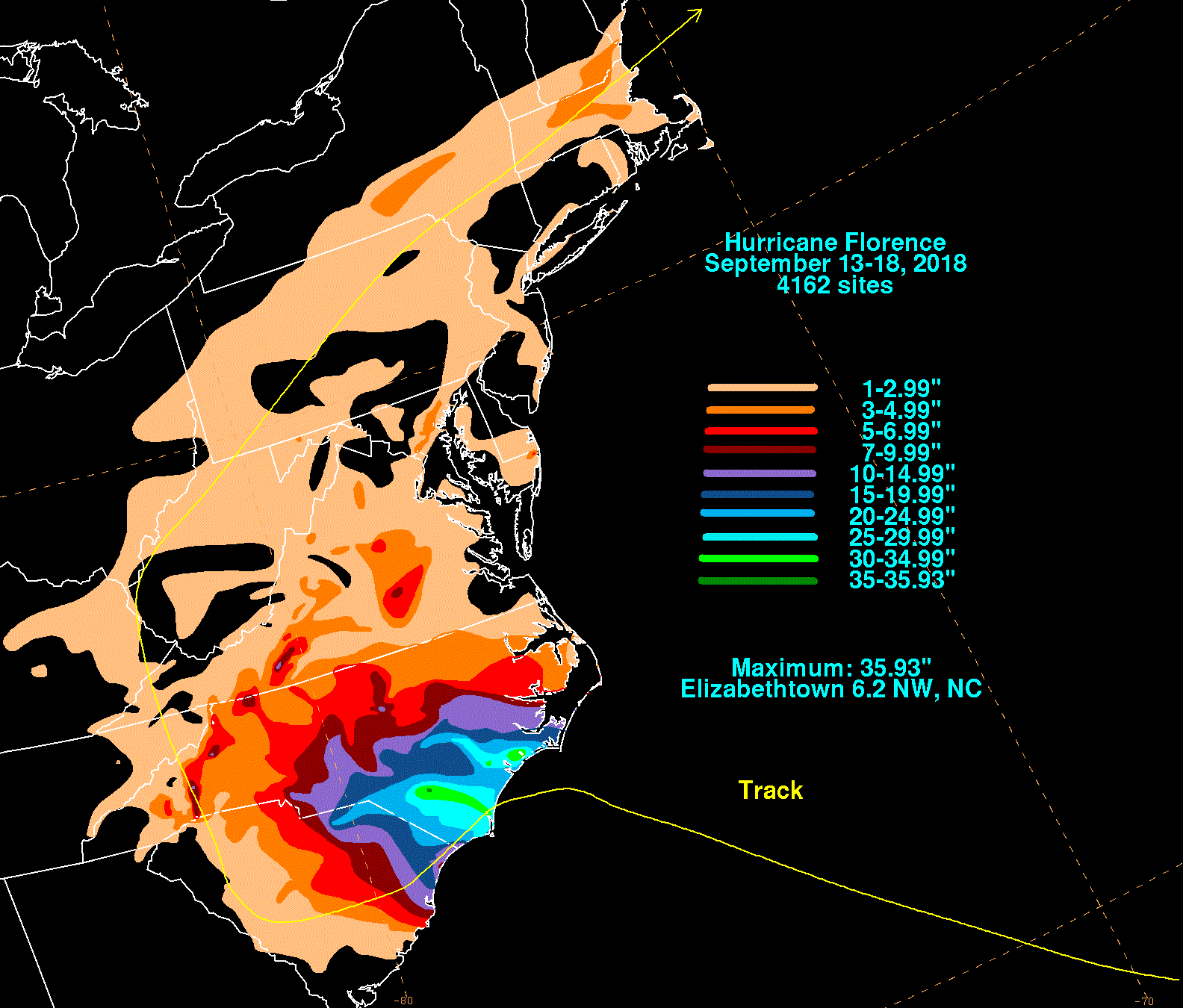
Rainfall totals caused by Hurricane Florence along the U.S. East Coast, with a maximum of 35.95" in Elizabethtown.

Due to its location in the coastal plain of southeastern North Carolina, Elizabethtown is vulnerable to severe tropical cyclones. During Hurricane Florence in September 2018, a weather station near Elizabethtown recorded 35.93 inches (913 mm) of rainfall. This total broke the previous record for the highest amount of precipitation dropped by a single tropical cyclone in North Carolina history, which had stood since Hurricane Floyd in 1999. Two years prior, in October 2016, Hurricane Matthew also caused severe flash flooding and historic river cresting along the Cape Fear River.

== Demographics ==
Historical population
Census	Pop.	Note	%±
1870	62		—
1880	212		241.9%
1900	144		—
1910	117		−18.7%
1920	335		186.3%
1930	765		128.4%
1940	1,123		46.8%
1950	1,611		43.5%
1960	1,625		0.9%
1970	1,418		−12.7%
1980	3,551		150.4%
1990	3,704		4.3%
2000	3,698		−0.2%
2010	3,583		−3.1%
2020	3,296		−8.0%
U.S. Decennial Census

=== 2020 census ===
As of the 2020 census, Elizabethtown had a population of 3,296. The median age was 46.4 years. 18.6% of residents were under the age of 18, and 26.3% of residents were 65 years of age or older. For every 100 females, there were 81.7 males, and for every 100 females age 18 and over, there were 78.7 males age 18 and over.

0.0% of residents lived in urban areas, while 100.0% lived in rural areas.

There were 1,434 households in Elizabethtown, of which 26.4% had children under the age of 18 living in them. Of all households, 29.7% were married-couple households, 20.0% were households with a male householder and no spouse or partner present, and 45.3% were households with a female householder and no spouse or partner present. About 40.9% of all households were made up of individuals, and 21.6% had someone living alone who was 65 years of age or older. 750 families were residing in the town.

There were 1,631 housing units, of which 12.1% were vacant. The homeowner vacancy rate was 2.0%, and the rental vacancy rate was 4.9%.

Racial composition as of the 2020 census
Race	Number	Percent
White	1,506	45.7%
Black or African American	1,553	47.1%
American Indian and Alaska Native	33	1.0%
Asian	11	0.3%
Native Hawaiian and Other Pacific Islander	0	0.0%
Some other race	83	2.5%
Two or more races	110	3.3%
Hispanic or Latino (of any race)	139	4.2%

=== 2000 census ===
As of the census of 2000, there were 3,698 people, 1,536 households, and 907 families residing in the town. The population density was 805.9 inhabitants per square mile (311.2/km^{2}). There were 1,688 housing units at an average density of 367.9 units per square mile (142.0 units/km^{2}). The racial makeup of the town was 48.05% White, 48.97% African American, 0.43% Native American, 0.30% Asian, 0.03% Pacific Islander, 1.30% from other races, and 0.92% from two or more races. Hispanic or Latino of any race were 2.54% of the population.

There were 1,536 households, out of which 26.6% had children under the age of 18 living with them, 36.4% were married couples living together, 19.2% had a female householder with no husband present, and 40.9% were non-families. 38.6% of all households were made up of individuals, and 16.6% had someone living alone who was 65 years of age or older. The average household size was 2.21, and the average family size was 2.93.

In the town, the population was spread out, with 22.4% under the age of 18, 7.7% from 18 to 24, 23.8% from 25 to 44, 24.4% from 45 to 64, and 21.7% who were 65 years of age or older. The median age was 42 years. For every 100 females, there were 79.9 males. For every 100 females age 18 and over, there were 72.5 males.

The median income for a household in the town was $21,944, and the median income for a family was $38,750. Males had a median income of $36,133 versus $25,417 for females. The per capita income for the town was $15,303. About 24.6% of families and 31.1% of the population were below the poverty line, including 47.3% of those under age 18 and 27.8% of those age 65 or over.

== Notable people ==
- Curtis Brown (born 1956) – former NASA astronaut and retired United States Air Force colonel
- Desmond Bryant (born 1985) – former NFL player
- J. Bayard Clark (1882–1959) – U.S. Congressman
- Chris Cole (born 1996) – professional soccer player
- Homer L. Lyon (1879–1956) – U.S. Congressman
- Emerson Martin (born 1970) – professional American football player and coach
- William McBryar (1861–1941) – Buffalo soldier, Medal of Honor recipient
- James Iver McKay (1792–1853) – U.S. Congressman
- Larrell Murchison (born 1997) – defensive end for the Los Angeles Rams
- Edd Nye (1932–2025) – long-serving member of the North Carolina General Assembly
- Kevin Richardson (born 1986) – former college football player for Appalachian State University
- William Saltar (1732–1802) – Revolutionary War politician, delegate to the North Carolina Provincial Congress, original founder and trustee of Elizabethtown.
